= List of left communist organisations in the Weimar Republic =

The list of Left Communist organisations in the Weimar Republic includes groups and organisations associated with left communism. Some of them are groups of the left-wing opposition of the Communist Party of Germany (KPD) who opposed the course of KPD leadership both within and without the party, especially against the Stalinization. They formed party factions in the KPD, were excluded or broke away to form independent groups.

== List ==
Year formed	Name	Main representatives	Number of members	Publication
1918	Left KPD (mostly International Communists of Germany (1918))	Otto Rühle; Heinrich Laufenberg; Johann Knief	~38,000	
1920	General Workers' Union of Germany (AAUD)	Otto Rühle; Rudolf Ziegenhagen (de)	200,000 (1921) - 12,600 (1924)	
1920	Communist Workers' Party of Germany (KAPD)	Otto Rühle	~40,000 (1920) - 4,000 (1927)	
1920	Bund der Kommunisten (1920)	Heinrich Laufenberg; Fritz Wolffheim		
1921	Allgemeine Arbeiter-Union – Einheitsorganisation (AAU-E)	Otto Rühle; Franz Pfemfert; Oskar Kanehl		Die Aktion
1924	Weddinger Opposition	Hans Weber		Der Pionier
1925	Internationaler Sozialistischer Kampfbund (ISK)	Leonard Nelson; Minna Specht	>300	
1925	Fischer-Maslow-Gruppe	Ruth Fischer; Arkadi Maslow		
1926	KPD-Opposition (Left KPD)	Iwan Katz (de); Theodor Gohr; Berthold Karwahne (de)	~800	Newsletter for the party workers of the KPD organization in Lower Saxony/Thuringia (Mitteilungsblatt für die Parteiarbeiter der KPD-Organisation in Niedersachsen / in Thüringen)
1926	Linke Kommunisten	Werner Scholem; Hugo Urbahns (de)	15	Schlacht und Hütte
1926	Entschiedene Linke (EL)	Karl Korsch; Heinrich Schlagewerth (de); Ernst Schwarz	7,000	Alle Macht den Räten! Kommunistische Politik
1926	Entschiedene Linke (Schwarz-Gruppe)	Ernst Schwarz	4,000	Entschiedene Linke
1926	Kommunistische Arbeitsgemeinschaft (KAG 1926)	Otto Geithner (de); Agnes Schmidt; Hans Schreyer (de)		
1926	Spartakusbund linkskommunistischer Organisationen (de)	Iwan Katz; Franz Pfemfert; Oskar Kanehl	12,000 - 6,000	Spartakus
1926	Gruppe Kommunistische Politik (GKP)	Karl Korsch	3,000 (1927)	Kommunistische Politik; Der Klassenkämpfer; Die Wahrheit
1926	Kötter-Vogt-Gruppe	Wilhelm Kötter; Otto Voigt		
1926	Weber-Gruppe	Hans Weber		
1926	Fischer-Urbahns-Gruppe	Ruth Fischer; Hugo Urbahns		Die Fahne des Kommunismus; Mitteilungsblatt Linke Opposition der KPD
1928	Bolschewistische Einheit	Erwin Heinz Ackerknecht; Otto Schüssler; Robert Soblen	50	
4/1928	Leninbund	Hugo Urbahns	6,000 (1928) - 500 (1932)	Volkswille
1929	Trotzkistische Minderheit			
1930	United Left Opposition of the KPD (Bolshevik-Leninists) (de)	Anton Grylewicz	350 – 400	Internationales Bulletin der kommunistischen Links-Opposition; Mitteilungsblatt der Reichsleitung; Permanente Revolution; Der Kampfruf
1931	Linke Opposition der KPD (Trotzkisten) (Left Opposition of the KPD (Trotskyist))	Erwin Ackerknecht; Oskar Seipold (de)	150 (1931) - 1,000 (1933)	
1931	Linke Opposition der KPD (Landau-Gruppe)	Kurt Landau	100 – 300	Der Kommunist
1931	Communist Workers Union of Germany (Kommunistische Arbeiter-Union Deutschlands KAUD)	Jan Appel	~300	
1933	Internationale Kommunisten Deutschlands (IKD 1933) (de)			Unser Wort
1933	Gruppe Funke (de)	Kurt Landau		
