= Weddinger Opposition =

Weddinger Opposition Weddinger Opposition
- Leader: Hans Weber
- Founded: 1924
- Dissolved: 1936
- Headquarters: Wedding
- Membership (1927): 2000
- Ideology: Left communism Trotskyism (later)
- Political position: Far-left
- National affiliation: Communist Party of Germany
- International affiliation: International Left Opposition

The Weddinger opposition (also known as the Weber group, more rarely Wedding-Palatinate opposition) was a group of the ultra-left wing of the Communist Party of Germany (KPD) that was formed in 1924. From 1928 onwards, the KPD leadership acted with numerous party expulsions against the group, which had been organized as a parliamentary group in the KPD since 1926. The group had around 2000 members in 1927; their strongholds were in the Berlin district of Wedding, in the Palatinate, which belongs to Bavaria, and in western Saxony.

== Origin and strongholds ==
Researchers had identified two strikes at the BASF plant in Ludwigshafen, Palatinate, as the "constituent event" for the emergence of the Weddinger opposition. In November 1922, the chemical company dismissed Max Frenzel and two other works councilors because they had participated in a communist works council congress. Contrary to the attitude of the Social Democratic Party (SDP) and the independent trade unions, workers from BASF and other Ludwigshafen companies showed solidarity with the dismissed, but were unable to get them reinstated in a strike lasting several weeks. The factory workers' association in Ludwigshafen split through exclusions and resignations; the communist industrial association of the chemical industry was created under Fritz Baumgärtner. A second strike in the spring of 1924, which was directed against the extension of the daily working hours to nine hours, was unsuccessful, but led to a temporary mass influx to the industrial association. The establishment of the industrial association contradicted the resolutions of the Communist Party of Germany (KPD) at the time, according to which communists should work in the unions of the General German Trade Union Federation (ADGB). The historian Marcel Bois sees the "extreme hostility" of the Weddinger opposition towards the independent trade unions and their "strong anchoring in the local workforce" as a result of the strikes at BASF.

The ultra-left KPD party leadership elected in April 1924 under Ruth Fischer and Arkadi Maslow found the support of the Palatinate party district. When Fischer and Maslow moderated their course in early 1925, the Palatinate became part of the ultra-left opposition. For example, a joint candidate from the SPD and KPD was rejected in the 1925 presidential election. In September 1925 the Executive Committee of the Communist International (ECCI) wrote an open letter to the German Communists and sharply criticized the KPD's course. Thereupon Fischer and Maslow were replaced. Like other ultra-left groups, the Palatinate opposed the EKKI's open letter.

Independent of the grouping in the Palatinate, an ultra-left opposition emerged in the Berlin district of Wedding in January 1925. The Palatinate and Weddinger groups became networked when the new KPD leadership under Ernst Thälmann deposed the Palatinate district manager Hans Weber at the end of 1925 in order to weaken the opposition there. Weber was transferred to the trade union department of the Central Committee in Berlin, where he lived in Wedding and quickly became the leading head of the opposition group there; while at the same time he retained his influence in the Palatinate.

The third focus of the Weddinger opposition was the party district of West Saxony in the city of Leipzig. West Saxony was a stronghold of the SPD, which also dominated the trade unions and other organizations of the labor movement. Still belonging to the left wing of the party, the Social Democrats largely adhered to the ban on joint actions with the KPD. The reasons for the success of the ultra-left in West Saxony are the difficulties of the KPD in taking action in view of the dominant position of the SPD in the labor movement, as well as the person of Artur Vogt. Vogt had been in contact with Hans Weber since the summer of 1924.

Other party members attributable to the Weddinger opposition lived in other districts of Berlin, in particular in Weißensee, as well as in Lower Saxony and Bielefeld. The Bielefeld sub-district leader Wilhelm Kötter, like Hans Weber, had been replaced and transferred to Berlin, through which he came into contact with the Weddinger opposition.

== Formation of factions and positions ==
According to a report by the party's internal surveillance, at an event on February 12, 1926 in Wedding, the local groups joined together to form a national faction, a leadership was elected and guidelines for the work of the group were adopted. Marcel Bois sees this meeting as an attempt to prevent the ultra-left opposition from breaking up and refers to the participation of people like Iwan Katz, Karl Korsch and Ernst Schwarz, none of whom joined the Weddingen opposition. Nevertheless, one could "explicitly identify a Weddinger opposition" after the ultra-left further differentiated itself in the following months.

The Weddinger opposition accused the KPD leadership under Ernst Thälmann of continuing the course of Fischer and Maslow in restricting internal party democracy. The opposition group rejected the thesis of a relative stabilization of capitalism and assumed its imminent demise. The united front line was rejected; For example, the referendum on the expropriation of the princes represented a “revival of reformist illusions” for the Weddinger opposition. In the trade union issue, there was apparently a change of course and a rapprochement with the line of the central committee: on behalf of the Palatinate district management, Baumgärtner and Frenzel argued in early 1926 for KPD members to join the independent trade unions.

== Decline ==
At the end of 1926, the Weddinger opposition split into two currents. The reason was the so-called Letter of 700, which was initiated on the occasion of the expulsion of Grigori Zinoviev from the Politburo of the CPSU by the Weddinger opposition and an ultra-left group around Ruth Fischer, Hugo Urbahns and the Reichstag member Werner Scholem. The letter saw the party in a state of siege and noted an atmosphere of hypocrisy, fear, insecurity and disintegration. With the slogan back to Lenin, an open discussion in the KPD was called for, especially about the situation in the Soviet Union.

Wilhelm Kötter and Artur Vogt refused to sign the letter of the 700 because they were bothered by the involvement of Ruth Fischer and Arkadi Maslow. After an increasingly polemical exchange of blows between Kötter and Weber, the Weddingen opposition split.

From the point of view of the party leadership and the ECCI, the split was a good development because it made it easier to fight the opposition. Compared to other opposition groups, the KPD leadership had so far acted cautiously against the Weddinger opposition.

=== Kötter / Vogt Group ===
The group around Wilhelm Kötter and Artur Vogt retained their fundamentally oppositional stance, although the goal of avoiding exclusion from the party was more pronounced than with other currents. At the party conference of the West Saxony district in March 1927, supporters of Vogt were elected to the district leadership. In the course of 1927, the party leadership increasingly restricted the group's options for action. The group could no longer present its positions at party congresses or in the party press; leaflets and circulars were also confiscated by the party apparatus.

The further development of the Kötter / Vogt group in West Saxony is controversial in research: It is sometimes assumed that the group disbanded at the end of 1927; In some cases, it is assumed that it continued to exist, with many members adopting the line of the party leadership, which was made easier by the KPD's renewed turn to the left. A residual group around Paul Heidemann in Bielefeld continued to exist illegally after the rise to power of the Nazi Party in 1933, until it was broken up in mid-1936.

=== Weber Group ===
In 1927, the group around Hans Weber initially dominated the KPD branches in the Palatinate and Wedding. At the Essen party congress in March 1927, the group played only a minor role; however, two of their representatives, Max Gerbig and Adolf Betz, were elected to the Central Committee. Betz broke away from the opposition in December 1927. In the same month the KPD leadership was able to assert itself against the opposition in Wedding for the first time since 1925. Weber left the Weddinger party leadership and returned to the Palatinate.

In January 1928, the party leadership deposed Fritz Baumgärtner as Polleiter of the Palatinate because of an allegedly anti-party attitude. Several subdistricts and local groups protested against the removal of Baumgärtner, as well as the Arbeiter-Turnerinnen der Pfalz. In February and March, Fritz Baumgärtner, Max Frenzel and Hans Weber were expelled from the KPD. Accepting considerable membership losses through resignations and further exclusions, the party leadership succeeded in gaining a majority at the Palatinate District Party Congress in May 1928.

The Weber group was involved in talks leading up to the establishment of the Lenin League in April 1928, but refused to participate in the league. Nevertheless, the Weber Group and the Lenin League ran together as the Old Communist Party (AKP) in the 1928 Reichstag election for the Palatinate constituency. The AKP remained meaningless with 3,127 votes, about a tenth of the votes for the KPD. However, contrary to the imperial trend in the Palatinate, the KPD lost votes.

From the beginning of 1929 the group led by Max Frenzel called themselves Leninist-Bolsheviks. They published the former KPD functionary magazine Der Pionier with a circulation of 1000 copies. According to KPD reports, the group succeeded in broadening its base, benefiting from its anchoring in the labor movement. The number of members is said to have increased from around 160 (1928) to around 200 to 300 (late 1929). In the city council election in Ludwigshafen in December 1929, the group appeared as the Left Opposition of the KPD and achieved around 1,000 votes, almost a third of the KPD votes. The mandate won was carried out by Max Frenzel. For unknown reasons, Hans Weber withdrew from politics at the end of 1929, with which the group lost "one of its outstanding personalities".

Even under Weber, the group had moved closer to Trotskyist positions. For example, a solidarity campaign was organized against Leon Trotsky's expulsion from the Soviet Union. In 1929 Weber published a German translation of Trotsky's work The International Revolution and the Communist International and contributed a foreword. From 1929 Kurt Landau tried to bring the remaining groups of the Weddinger opposition together with the opposition in the Lenin League. The Linke Opposition der KPD, founded in March 1930, split in 1931, with the former members of the Weddinger opposition mostly joining the group around Landau, also known as the Funke Group.

== Bibliography ==
- Becker, Klaus J. (2001). Die KPD in Rheinland-Pfalz 1946–1956 (in German). Mainz: V. Hase & Koehler. pp. 27–37. ISBN 3-7758-1393-4.
- Becker, Klaus J. (2005). "Zwischen ultralinker Parteiopposition und titoistischer Verfemung. Die pfälzische KPD 1919–1956". Mitteilungen des Historischen Vereins der Pfalz. 103: 343–376.
- Berens, Peter (2016). Die ´Atomisierung' der KPD zwischen 1923 – 1927 am Beispiel des KPD-Bezirks Ruhrgebiet (PDF) (in German). Essen.
- Bois, Marcel (2014). Kommunisten gegen Hitler und Stalin. Die linke Opposition der KPD in der Weimarer Republik. Eine Gesamtdarstellung (in German). Essen: Klartext. ISBN 978-3-8375-1282-3.
- Schiffmann, Dieter (1983). Von der Revolution zum Neunstundentag. Arbeit und Konflikt bei BASF 1918–1924 (in German). Frankfurt am Main: Campus. pp. 271–318, 334–367. ISBN 3-593-33183-7.
- Zadoff, Mirjam (2014). Der rote Hiob. Das Leben des Werner Scholem (in German). München: CarlHanser Verlag. ISBN 978-3-446-24622-5.
