= Valentin Olberg =

- Валентин Ольберг
- Olberg in January 1936
- Born: 1907; Zurich, Switzerland
- Died: 25 August 1936 (aged 28–29); Moscow, Soviet Union
- Cause of death: Execution by firing squad
- Citizenship: Stateless (held Nansen passport)
- Occupations: Teacher, journalist, political activist
- Known for: Defendant in the 1936 Moscow Trial
- Political party: Communist Party of Germany (1928–1933); Socialist Workers' Party of Germany (1931–1933)
- Other political affiliations: Communist Party of Latvia
- Movement: Trotskyism
- Criminal charges: Counter-revolutionary activity; Terrorism
- Criminal penalty: Death
- Criminal status: Posthumously rehabilitated in 1988
- Spouses: Sulamif Olberg-Braun (m. 1930; div. 1931); Betty Olberg (m. 1931)
- Parents: Paul Olberg; Paulina Beskina
- Relatives: Pavel Olberg (brother)

Valentin Pavlovich Olberg (Russian: Валентин Павлович Ольберг; 1907 – 25 August 1936) was a Latvian-born Jewish, Russian, and German Communist, member of the Communist Party of Germany, activist of the Trotskyist opposition and history teacher at the Gorky Pedagogical Institute. He was arrested by the secret police of the Soviet Union, the NKVD, in January 1936 and became a main defendant in the first Moscow Trial in August. His testimony played an important role in the arrests and executions of oppositionists in the USSR during the Great Purges.

Olberg was sentenced to death after the trial and executed, with almost all the other defendants, on 25 August 1936.

== Early life ==
Valentin Olberg was born in Zurich in 1907. His father was the prominent Menshevik Paul Karlovich Olberg, a Latvian émigré from the Russian Empire. Paul Olberg was highly active in European Menshevik and Social Democratic circles, often cited as an expert on Russian affairs. His mother, Paulina Izrailevna Beskina, was a midwife and masseuse. His younger brother, Pavel Olberg was born in 1909 in Helsinfor (now Helsinki), Finland. Assigning a concrete nationality to Olberg is difficult. As a result of Paul's journalistic and revolutionary activities across Europe before and after World War I, he and his family spent time in Riga, Stockholm, Berlin and Helsinki. In the personnel form he filled out for the Gorky Pedagogical Institute, he listed his spoken languages as Russian, German, and Spanish.

== Political activities ==
=== 1928: Latvian Communist Party ===
After graduating from a German high school some time in the 1920s, Olberg travelled to Latvia. He met up with his brother in Riga, and from 1928 Olberg was closely associated with the Communist Party of Latvia, specifically its Trotskyist wing. Latvian police pressure against Marxists escalated later that year, forcing Olberg and his brother to emigrate to Germany. Many of their closest comrades followed them, including the daughter of Menshevik Alex Braun, Sulamif Braun, who later became Olberg's first wife.

=== Late 1928-1935: Berlin and the KPD ===
Valentin and Pavel Olberg arrived in Germany in late 1928. Although Paul managed to obtain German passports for Paulina and Pavel the next year, Valentin was unable to receive a passport, since he had already already reached adulthood and was likely known as a Communist. Thereafter he carried only a Nansen passport, a document issued to stateless post-WWI refugees by the League of Nations.

After arriving in Berlin, Olberg and several comrades from Riga joined the Communist Party of Germany (KPD). From 1929 Olberg aligned with the Trotskyist Weddinger Opposition active within the KPD, specifically the unruly wing led by Kurt Landau, a Trotskyist activist who was assassinated in 1937 by the NKVD. The pair became close allies and friends, but Olberg left his group after the splits suffered by the Weddinger Opposition. Olberg himself suffered multiple setbacks, personal and political, in the course of the next few years. In late 1931 his wife, Sulamif, left him for another man, leading to a protracted and contentious divorce. He shortly thereafter married Betty Siermann, another committed Trotskyist and KPD member.

In March 1932 Olberg was expelled from the KPD altogether, after another party member discovered and reported Olberg's Menshevik heritage and "anti-Bolshevik" activities in Riga. Then, in April 1932, possibly in connection with his activities as a communist, Berlin police arrested Olberg. There was no love lost between him and the Berlin communists: while in custody, Olberg and his father cooperated with the police by providing them with a detailed list of KPD members. When a character reference became a precondition for Olberg's release, the influential Russian émigré, Menshevik Raphael Abramovitch, vouched for him. Olberg stated he knew Abramovitch personally, but the exact extent of relations between the two is unknown.

His KPD membership had previously enabled him to work a low-wage but full-time job at the KPD's school of Marxism. After he was expelled, Olberg lost his primary source of income and fell into poverty. Berlin police reported that he lived off charity and housing allowances, although he claimed to get occasional fees for journalism.

Sometime later that year, Olberg's former KPD comrades broke into his apartment and seized 43 letters and postcards from Leon Trotsky and his son, Lev Sedov, written between January 1930 and May 1932. There were also letters from Anton Grylewicz, at the time one of Trotsky's closest confidants. By June these materials, including eleven addresses Olberg had sent letters to, had made their way to the Berlin office of the Comintern, which forwarded them to the Soviet secret police. The stolen archive contained extensive information about Olberg's close ties to Sedov and Trotsky, who entrusted Olberg with crucial work. In Berlin he helped Grylewicz distribute Trotskyist literature such as the Bulletin of the Opposition, and served as a middle man in communications with the Landau group. Olberg frequently sent reports to Sedov on the internecine politics of Berlin Marxists. He was also trusted with clandestine tasks involving Trotsky's supporters in the USSR; Olberg managed communications, located safe houses, and wrote propaganda based on their smuggled reports. Sedov and Olberg frequently met in person while the former was in Berlin.

After Adolf Hitler was appointed Chancellor of Germany on 30 January 1933, the Olbergs were stripped of their German citizenships. Olberg's brother Pavel was safely studying in Prague, Czechoslovakia (now the capital of the Czech Republic) at the time, but their father Paul was forced to relocate to Sweden. Olberg and his comrades in the Trotskyist opposition, however, chose to stay in Berlin, living underground and publishing an illegal Trotskyist paper. By March 1934 the Gestapo had liquidated most of the group's leaders, with most being executed in July. Olberg was not among those arrested, but he continue to visit Berlin even after his comrades had been executed or sent to concentration camps. He and his Betty both stated during interrogations that he stayed in the apartment of his father-in-law, O. Siermann, an active member of the Nazi Party. His close friend Kurt Landau stated in multiple letters that Olberg was staying in Berlin in the months of April-May 1935. What Olberg was doing between the years of 1932 to 1936 is still not fully clear, although he, his family and his comrades made many claims about his activities during this period while under interrogation.

From 1933 onwards, Olberg moved between Germany, Latvia, Belgium, Czechoslovakia and the Soviet Union, exclusively staying in his comrade's apartments carrying out tasks for the Trotskyist opposition. While he had a poorly-paid part-time job while in Prague, how he could have supported himself or financed his travels in the period is unknown.

=== 1933-1936: Visits to the Soviet Union ===
Olberg travelled to the Soviet Union on three occasions, possibly in response to the arrest of the Old Bolshevik Ivan Smirnov and his group in January 1933, which destabilised the Trotskyist bloc. Travelling to the country required a legally recognised passport — as he was a stateless individual, Olberg stated that he had "borrowed" the passport of an Austrian friend called Yevgeny Freudigmann.

Olberg's first visit was from March-July 1933. In March, Olberg and his wife arrived in Moscow, and he immediately began contacting his old German and Latvian Trotskyist comrades. The couple stayed in their apartments while he sought to find stable employment, before travelling to far-off Stalinabad (now Dushanbe), Tajikistan.

The Olbergs gave the following story during their interrogations: in his quest to find stable employment that would allow him to stay in the country, Olberg applied for a job at the Stalinabad Institute, posing as a Soviet citizen. This backfired when his interviewers requested documents proving Olberg's completion of compulsory Soviet military service, which he was unable to provide. Having failed to locate employment, he and Betty were forced to leave the country, and by July the couple had returned to either Prague or Berlin. Olberg stated that he had travelled to Stalinabad in order to locate Platon Volkov, who was allegedly a crucial courier for clandestine communication with Sedov.

After returning from the Soviet Union, Olberg then obtained a Honduran passport, which he used to travel to Moscow on a tourist visa for a short spell in March 1935. How he acquired the money for this passport is unclear.

The final time Olberg visited the country was in July 1935, again on his Honduran papers. Fellow Trotskyist Ivan Kuzmich Fedotov, the rector of the Gorky Pedagogical Institute in Gorky (now Nizhny Novgorod), was able to get Olberg a job there as a history teacher. Both were arrested in January the following year.

== Role in the 1936 Moscow Trial ==
=== The investigation ===
==== Background ====
Paranoia within the NKVD was rampant in the years following the 1934 assassination of Sergei Kirov. In December 1935 V. Balitskii, head of the Ukrainian NKVD, sent Moscow a detailed report about the arrests of 33 members, some of whom had confessed, of a "Trotskyist, Nationalist, Menshevik", "terrorist" organisation, which allegedly had ties to Fedotov. A parallel investigation into another group in Gorky also pointed investigators to the Gorky Pedagogical Institute. On 1 January 1936, the GUGB NKVD stated in a message to its Ukrainian counterparts that they had exposed a Valentin Olberg, the "emissary of Trotsky".

It is not clear how exactly the secret police were put onto Olberg, but he was arrested, along with his wife and brother, on 5 January 1936. Fedotov was detained five days later on 10 January, after returning from vacation. NKVD investigators accused Olberg of being a Trotskyist and a terrorist, and conducted at least 3 interrogations of Olberg in early 1936. He initially resisted, providing contradictory testimony and denying that he was a Trotskyist — up until his interrogation on 13 February. During this interrogation, and from that point onwards, Olberg began to confess to the charges, stating that he was indeed sent by Trotsky to help prepare the assassination of the USSR's leaders, in particular Joseph Stalin. Many Trotskyists and ultra-leftists of this era had begun to write of the importance of removing Stalin, as they thought his policies would inevitably lead to the defeat of the international socialist movement. While under interrogations, Olberg and his comrades frequently described their views on Stalin in these terms.

NKVD confessions and investigative materials related to the Moscow Trials were not available to scholars until very recently. How to interpret and use the claims made by those under interrogation has not yet been fully established, but their testimonies hew very closely with their public statements at trial. Historians William J. Chase and Olga Novikova-Monterde argue that the confessions have a certain verisimilitude, pointing to consistencies between the interrogation protocols of those arrested, lack of signs of torture being used, and correlations with primary and secondary sources such as memoir writings, NKVD agent reports and the statements of those who knew Olberg. Regardless, it seems that Stalin, the NKVD and Moscow Trials prosecutor Andrei Vyshinsky all believed and took the confessions seriously.

==== The Olbergs' testimony ====
According to the Olbergs and others arrested, their group planned to send conspirators into the crowds at the May Day parade in Moscow, and throw bombs onto Stalin's podium. A parallel organisation was supposed to bomb Andrei Zhdanov's car in Leningrad. Independent confirmation of these alleged plans is lacking. Why Olberg began confessing is unclear, but he had been told by this stage that the testimony of his wife and brother incriminated him and contradicted his own statements. Olberg told a presiding interrogator on 23 April that at some point earlier that month he had been personally interrogated by NKVD chief Genrikh Yagoda, after which Olberg decided to tell the NKVD "about all the terrorists known to me". From around this time, Olberg and Fedotov started to give detailed, consistent testimony about their alleged operations and the roles played by certain individuals. What Olberg and Yagoda discussed is unknown, but it is possible the latter may have offered him more lenient treatment of his wife Betty, the only member of his circle not executed after the trial, in exchange for testimony. It is also possible he confessed under the influence, or threat, of torture, although there is not evidence of either in the available documents.

In June 1936, Mark Zborowski, an undercover NKVD agent deep inside the Trotskyist movement, sent an incriminating report to his handlers in Moscow. After the arrests of Olberg and his wider circle, Zborowski described how Sedov suggested Zborowski enter the country to appraise the situation: "We will give you instructions, money and a passport. You will go for two or three months, travel around to several locations to addresses that I will give you." This description shared similarities with Olberg's testimony about preparations for his trip.

All three of the arrested Olbergs testified that the Gestapo arrested Olberg for being a Jew and a communist in 1933. According to Chase and Novikova-Monterde, they gave the following account: after the Gestapo threatened to send him to a concentration camp, or worse, Olberg told them about the mission Sedov had allegedly gave him, to travel to the USSR and help assassinate Stalin. Upon hearing this his investigators decided to release him, on condition that he accept their offer of assistance with his conspiratorial plans. He, and later Sedov agreed to this arrangement. In this version of events, the Gestapo gave Olberg money for his trip and helped him acquire a Honduran passport for 13,000 Czechoslovak koruna, money that Olberg acquired from Sedov. The Trotskyist underground in Berlin, led by a Fella Slomowitz, had allegedly also reached a similar agreement with the Nazi police out of political necessity: the Gestapo knew each member of the organisation anyway, so the choice was cooperation or extinction.

Pavel Olberg claimed that he too was a Gestapo agent, recruited in 1933 by Vladimir Tukalevsky, director of the Slavonic Library in Prague. Tukalevsky was a right wing émigré Socialist Revolutionary who worked closely to the Labor Peasant Party, an obscure political organisation that advocated an unrelenting violent struggle against the USSR. He was also a purported Gestapo agent, and supposedly served as a conduit to the Gestapo during the Olberg brothers' time in Czechoslovakia. Olberg's mother, Paulina Beskina, later denied this version of events. She claimed that Olberg's father-in-law paid for the passport, in addition to funding all of his son-in-law and daughter's trips to the USSR. Her description of events would be fairly innocuous were it not for the fact that Betty's father was a Nazi.

There was allegedly a large wealth of evidence that the interrogators could draw on. Chase and Novikova-Monterde make reference to several internal NKVD telegrams sent to Stalin in mid-1936 that laid out much of the evidence. In addition to the NKVD's denunciations, reports from its international spy ring, confessions of those under arrest and the letters sent by the KPD in 1932, archived reports allege that investigators seized letters from Trotsky, weapons, ammunition, explosives and liquid for removing ink from passports in implicated apartments, universities, and on the persons of those under arrest.

Olberg's testimony was subsequently used by the NKVD to arrest many alleged oppositionists in the USSR, and the information he provided convinced Stalin to make him a crucial defendant in the 1936 Moscow Trial. His testimony also probably put the NKVD onto the trail of Landau, whom they eventually chased down and assassinated in Spain.

=== Trial and execution ===
Olberg was a key piece of the first Moscow Trial. Unlike many of the other defendants, he had close ties with Sedov and Trotsky, who supposedly told him about the various meetings they had with the Old Bolsheviks who headed the Trotskyist opposition. His claims about his and the opposition's links to the Gestapo, and allegations that many of the other defendants were aware of these links, enabled the prosecution to frame the defendants as Fascist agents. Olberg and five other political émigrés were in the dock at the trial: they represented a warning to the population about the dangers posed by foreigners. In court, he exercised his "right to put questions to the witnesses" and constantly undercut Ivan Smirnov, who was one of the only defendants to challenge the allegations.

After the conclusion of the trial, the three judges presiding found each of the defendants guilty, sentencing many of them to be executed. After his letter pleading for clemency was denied by the court, Olberg was shot on 25 August 1936.

== Depiction as an NKVD agent ==
Following Olberg's trial and execution, Trotsky and Sedov quickly set about organising a counter-narrative which denied almost every part of Olberg's testimony. The two men and their close collaborator Max Shachtman publicly claimed that Olberg was an NKVD agent who had tried and failed to penetrate Trotsky's network, then went on to testify under orders in the first Moscow Trial. According to them, Olberg was a distrusted outsider who was not close to Trotsky, Sedov or the Trotskyist movement. In September 1936, in his first article responding to the trial, Trotsky wrote: "by a happy accident, I found today in a pile of my old papers, two letters concerning Olberg" from Franz and Alexandra Ramm-Pfemfert, two old friends of Trotsky. In these letters, dated April 1930 from, the Pfemferts called Olberg a "Stalinist agent" after his attempts to apply for the position of Trotsky's secretary. Trotsky implied that this "insignificant episode" was the only time he had heard of Olberg, and he took the Pfemfert's advice to stay clear (although he later qualified this statement and admitted subsequent contacts). Many years later, the prominent Soviet defector Alexander Orlov also repeated the accusation of Olberg being an NKVD agent, although he offered no evidence. Orlov's reliability on various topics has been extensively criticised by many researchers.

Sedov himself noted that he had not heard from Olberg since late 1932, aside from a letter he received in early 1936 from Olberg from Prague. But Olberg was not in Prague at this time: since mid-1935 he had been in the Soviet Union, and in fact had already been arrested by the time Sedov received the letter, the contents of which suggest it was written in code. It was likely sent earlier than Sedov received it, via an underground communication network. Olberg and his comrades confessed to the existence of such a network while under interrogation.

Trotsky, Orlov and Sedov's depiction of Olberg has been almost universally accepted in Soviet scholarship. However, Trotsky and Sedov's archives make clear that the two, Sedov in particular, were in close contact with Olberg, and frequently trusted him with highly important tasks. Although Olberg did not end up becoming Trotsky's secretary, the latter's letters to Olberg suggest he was far from alarmed by the opinion of the Pfemferts, and may even have seriously considered Olberg for the post. Incredibly, the Pfemferts were far more keen on an actual Soviet agent, Roman Well, for the position of Trotsky's secretary.

According to Russian historian Vsevolod Vikhnovich, on the post-arrest personnel forms filled out by Olberg, Pavel, and Betty, the following is written: "There is NO INFORMATION in the Central file cabinet. Head of the 3rd branch of the OSU, GUGB of the NKVD." That is, the NKVD had no record of Olberg having worked for the Soviet state. Conversely, during Olberg's interrogations in spring 1936, Marc Zborowski was asked by his handlers to send information on Olberg and Landau. Chase and Novikova-Monterde argue that this order challenges the theory that Olberg was a Soviet agent, as it suggests the NKVD had little intelligence on his identity.

For his part, Landau strongly objected to the characterisation of Olberg as an NKVD agent. He personally vouched for Olberg as a dedicated member of his group, considering it his "political and human duty to stand up for the revolutionary honour of Valia [Valentin Olberg]."

== Family ==
Olberg's first wife, Sulamif, divorced him in 1931 and lived in Moscow from 1932. Sulamif was arrested a few weeks after Olberg on 23 February 1936, and sentenced to ten years in jail on 10 November. In October 1937 she was swiftly re-sentenced and shot.

His second wife, Betty, suffered a far lesser fate, possibly as part of a deal Olberg negotiated with the NKVD. Like Sulamif, Betty also received ten years in jail after the first Moscow Trial, but in February 1940 she was transferred to Germany along with other German prisoners. Margarete Buber-Neumann wrote that she and Betty met in Moscow around this time, after which they boarded a train to Germany. Buber-Neumann was sent to a concentration camp; Betty Olberg, unlike many other Communists, was not. She was instead allowed to live in peace with her parents in Forst (Lausitz), until she passed away on 18 October 1945.

While not a defendant in the first Moscow Trial, Olberg's brother Pavel confessed to being a co-conspirator and a Gestapo agent. He was convicted by a closed military court and shot along with other minor oppositionists on 2 October 1936.

== Sources ==
- Blomqvist, Håkan (2014). "Lost Worlds of Labour: Paul Olberg, the Jewish Labour Bund, and Menshevik Socialism". In Götz, Norbert (ed.). The Sea of Identities: A Century of Baltic and East European Experiences with Nationality, Class, and Gender. Södertörn Academic Studies, 60. Huddinge: Södertörn University. pp. 139–172. ISBN 978-91-87843-00-6. ISSN 1650-433X.
- Chase, William J. (2001). Enemies within the gates? The Comintern and the Stalinist repression, 1934-1939. New Haven: Yale University Press. ISBN 0300082428.
- Chase, William J. (2024). "Wrestling With Aspects of Interwar Stalinism". In Getty, J. Arch; Siegelbaum, Lewis H. (eds.). Reflections on Stalinism. Oxford: Cornell University Press. pp. 100–115. ISBN 9781501775543.
- Chase, William J.; Novikova-Monterde, Olga (2026). The Many Faces of Antifascism: Interwar Marxist Militant Networks and the Divided Response to Fascism. Oxford: Oxford University Press. doi:10.1093/9780198994428.001.0001. ISBN 9780198994428.
- Getty, J. Arch; Naumov, Oleg V. (2010). The Road to Terror: Stalin and the Self-Destruction of the Bolsheviks, 1932-1939 (2nd ed.). New Haven: Yale University Press. ISBN 978-0300104073.
- Vikhnovich, Vsevolod (2012). Валентин Ольберг — Жертва Двух Мифов (Эпизод Эпохи Большого Террора) [Valentin Olberg — A Victim of Two Myths (An Episode From the Era of the Great Terror)]. 2000 лет истории евреев России [2000 Years of the History of the Jews of Russia] (in Russian). St. Petersburg. pp. 371–379. ISBN 978-5-94396-117-5.
