= Arthur Rosenberg =

German historian and politician (1889–1943)

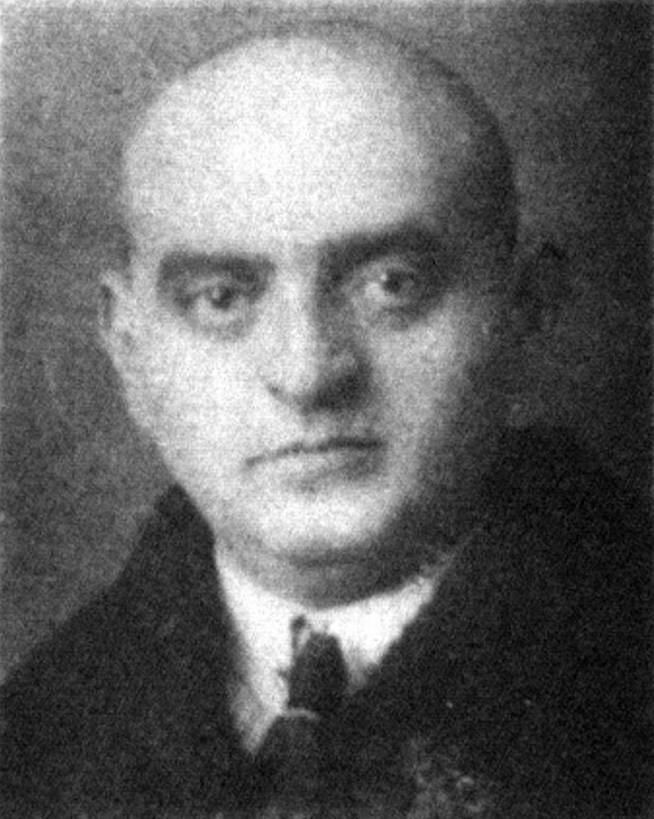
- Rosenberg c. 1924

Member of the Reichstag for Berlin
- In office 27 May 1924 – 1 July 1928
- Preceded by: Multi-member district
- Succeeded by: Multi-member district

Personal details
- Born: 19 December 1889 Berlin, Province of Brandenburg, Kingdom of Prussia, German Empire
- Died: 7 February 1943 (aged 53) New York City, U.S.
- Party: USPD (1918–1920); KPD (1920–1927)
- Spouse: Elly
- Children: 3
- Education: Friedrich-Wilhelms-Universität (PhD)
- Occupation: Politician; Historian

Military service
- Allegiance: German Empire
- Branch/service: Kriegspresseamt; Landsturm
- Years of service: 1915–1918
- Battles/wars: World War I; Western Front
- Central institution membership: 1924–1926: Full member, KPD Politburo; 1924–1926: Full member, KPD Central Committee (Note: Zentrale until 1925); Other offices held: 1921: Member, Berlin City Council

Arthur Rosenberg (19 December 1889 – 7 February 1943) was a German Marxist historian, writer, and politician. He served in the Reichstag from 1924 to 1928.

== Biography ==
=== Early years ===
Arthur Rosenberg was born on 19 December 1889 in Berlin to an assimilated Jewish merchant family from the Austro-Hungarian Empire, though he was baptized as a Protestant. He excelled at the Askanisches Gymnasium before studying at the Friedrich-Wilhelms-Universität in Berlin with Otto Hirschfeld and Eduard Meyer.

Rosenberg established himself as an expert in Roman constitutional history and held a PhD (1911) in ancient history and archeology.

In 1914, Rosenberg proved to be a conformist representative of the German academy, believing in the "ideas of 1914," and signing nationalist petitions. He then was drafted into the army, working for the Kriegspresseamt, the public relations office of the army.

=== Political career ===
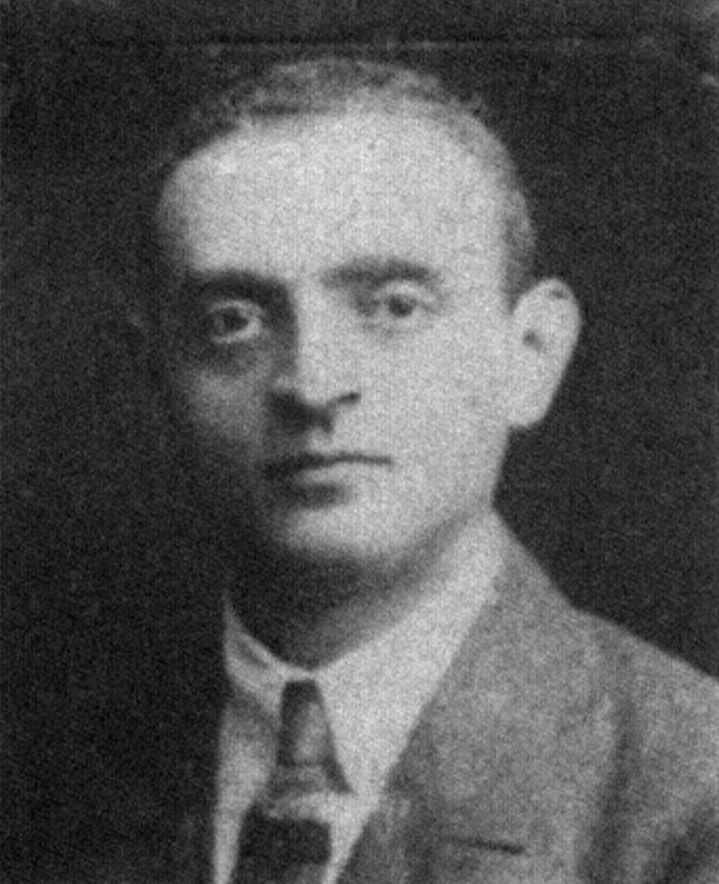
Rosenberg in his youth

After Germany's defeat in 1918 and his demobilization from the army, Rosenberg joined the new Independent Social Democratic Party (USPD). He went on to join the Communist Party of Germany (KPD) in 1920.

Rosenberg emerged as an important theoretician for the dissident left wing of the KPD in their ongoing factional struggle with the party leadership headed by Heinrich Brandler and August Thalheimer. He was regarded as one of the top leaders of the party left in the city of Berlin and was an advocate of the theory that the KPD should pursue a revolutionary offensive against the Weimar state.

The left wing gained control of the KPD in April 1924 and Rosenberg was elected a member of the governing Central Committee of the party as well as a delegate to the 5th Congress of the Communist International and a member of the Executive Committee of the Communist International (ECCI) that same year. Rosenberg denounced the Dawes Plan as a plot by American capitalists to take control of the German economy. However he rejoiced that the Plan would "drive the last nails into the coffin of the German Republic". He said the Communists were ready to give the Republic the final shove so that it would "meet the fate that it deserves".

When further factionalism swept the German Communist Party, Rosenberg maintained an ultra-left wing line as part of a factional group that included Werner Scholem, Iwan Katz, and Karl Korsch. This group fell into disfavor in Moscow from June 1925, however. In electing a new Central Committee the German party was invited by ECCI "to have no fear of drawing into the work the best elements from former groups not belonging to the Left" — an effort to further undercut Rosenberg's factional group.

Despite the criticism, Rosenberg was named a delegate to the 6th Enlarged Plenum of the CI in February 1926, at which he participated.

Expulsions of the left wing of the KPD followed in 1927, but Rosenberg was not himself one of those subject to such treatment. Nevertheless, he quit the KPD in April 1927, moving from the political realm to the field of scholarship. He taught at the University of Berlin and served as the head of an organization called the League of Rights of Man.

=== Years of exile ===
When the Nazi Party came to power in 1933, Rosenberg was dismissed from his university post due to his Jewish ethnicity. Rosenberg emigrated first to Switzerland before moving on to the United Kingdom.

From 1934 to 1937 he taught history at the University of Liverpool. He proceeded to the United States in 1937 to take a professorship at Brooklyn College, where he taught and wrote until the end of his life.

=== Death and legacy ===
Arthur Rosenberg died 7 February 1943 in New York City.

The right-wing German speaking newspaper 'New Yorker Staats-Zeitung und Herald' called his death a "hurtful surprise".

== Works ==
- Imperial Germany: The Birth of the German Republic, 1871–1918. Oxford University Press (1931), translation by Ian Morrow (*1896), original: Die Entstehung der deutschen Republik, Berlin, 1930
- A History of Bolshevism: From Marx to the First Five Years' Plan. (1932)
- Fascism as a Mass Movement. (1934)
- A History of the German Republic, 1918–1930. (1936)
- Democracy and Socialism: A Contribution to the Political History of the Past 150 Years. (1938)

== Literature ==
- Karl Christ: Römische Geschichte und deutsche Geschichtswissenschaft. München 1982, ISBN 3-406-08887-2, p. 177–186.
- Mario Keßler: Arthur Rosenberg. Ein Historiker im Zeitalter der Katastrophen (1889–1943).[Böhlau-Verlag, Köln/Wien 2003, ISBN 3-412-04503-9.
  - Kurzfassung (vorlaufend): Im Zeitalter der Katastrophen. Arthur Rosenberg (1889–1943). Im Spannungsfeld von Wissenschaft und Politik. VSA-Verlag, 2002, ISBN 3879759723, 39 S.
- Rosenberg, Arthur. In: Hermann Weber, Andreas Herbst: Deutsche Kommunisten. Biographisches Handbuch 1918 bis 1945. 2., überarb. und stark erw. Auflage, Karl Dietz Verlag, Berlin 2008, ISBN 978-3-320-02130-6.
- Jürgen von Ungern-Sternberg: "Rosenberg, Arthur." In The Dictionary of British Classicists. Bristol 2005, Bd. 3, pp. 836–838.
- Andreas Wirsching (2005). "Rosenberg, Arthur". Neue Deutsche Biographie (in German). Vol. 22. Berlin: Duncker & Humblot. pp. 61–62. (full text online).
- Francis L. Carsten, "Arthur Rosenberg: Ancient Historian into Leading Communist," Journal of Contemporary History, Vol. 8, No. 1. (Jan., 1973), pp. 63–75.
