= Left Communists (Weimar Republic) =

Left Communists Linke Kommunisten
- Founded: January 1926
- Dissolved: May 1928
- Split from: Communist Party of Germany
- Succeeded by: Lenin League
- Ideology: Left communism Ultra-leftism
- Political position: Far-left

The Left Communists were a group of members of the Reichstag and the Prussian Landtag expelled from the Communist Party of Germany (KPD) in the period 1926–1928.

== Reichstag ==
The Left Communists in the Reichstag were not a uniform political group, but merely a "technical" group to achieve group or parliamentary rights, totalling 15 politicians who had been expelled from the KPD between January 1926 and February 1928. These were both former members of the "left" wing of the KPD, such as Ruth Fischer, Hugo Urbahns, and Werner Scholem, as well as "ultra-left" members of parliament such as Iwan Katz, Karl Korsch, Ernst Schwarz, Heinrich Schlagewerth, and Karl Tiedt, there was no consensus on fundamental questions for communists, such as the question of a united front, the attitude to the Soviet Union, or the ADGB trade unions.

== Prussian Landtag ==
There was also in a group of eight deputies in the Prussian Landtag between 1927 and 1928 who were left communists, led by Anton Grylewicz.

== Dissolution ==
In 1928, some members of the Left Communists such as Fischer, Urbahns, and Otto Weber participated in the founding of the Lenin League, others engaged in council communist groups, or retired from politics after the loss of the mandate in the May 1928 elections.

== Members ==
=== Reichstag deputies ===
- Hans Bohla
- Ruth Fischer
- Iwan Katz
- Georg Kenzler
- Karl Korsch
- Heinrich Schlagewerth
- Paul Schlecht
- Werner Scholem
- Wilhelm Schwan
- Ernst Schwarz
- Karl Tiedt
- Hugo Urbahns
- Karl Vierath
- Otto Weber

=== Landtag deputies ===
- Wolfgang Bartels
- Ruth Fischer
- Anton Grylewicz
- Guido Heym
- Otto Kilian
- Peter Loquingen
- Fritz Lossau
- Gustav Müller

=== Other members ===
- Arkadi Maslow

== See also ==
- List of left communist organisations in the Weimar Republic

== Bibliography ==
- Otto Langels: Die ultralinke Opposition der KPD in der Weimarer Republik. Zur Geschichte und Theorie der KPD-Opposition (Linke KPD), der Entschiedenen Linken, der Gruppe „Kommunistische Politik“ und des Deutschen Industrie-Verbandes in den Jahren 1924 bis 1928 (= Europäische Hochschulschriften. Reihe 31: Politikwissenschaft. Bd. 65) Lang, Frankfurt am Main u. a. 1984, ISBN 3-8204-5385-7 (Zugleich: Heidelberg, Universität, Dissertation, 1984).
- Rüdiger Zimmermann: Der Leninbund. Linke Kommunisten in der Weimarer Republik (= Beiträge zur Geschichte des Parlamentarismus und der politischen Parteien. Bd. 62). Droste, Düsseldorf 1978, ISBN 3-7700-5096-7 (Zugleich: Darmstadt, Technische Hochschule, Dissertation, 1976).
