= Agnes Schmidt =

German activist and politician (1875–1952)

Agnes Schmidt (14 October 1875 – 21 November 1952) was a German activist and politician (SPD, USPD, KPD) who served as a member of the Parliament (''"Landtag"'') of State of Thuringia (1920–1952).

== Life ==
Agnes Schmidt was born in Gotha, a town rich in history located a short distance to the west of Erfurt in south central Germany. By 1900 she is already recorded as a member of the Social Democratic Party (SPD). In 1914, after war broke out in July, the party leadership's implementation of what amounted to a parliamentary truce in respect of funding the war triggered widespread dismay among the party membership. As frontline slaughter and economic destitution at home mounted, Agnes Schmidt was among those who broke away from the mainstream party to form the Independent Social Democratic Party ("Unabhängige Sozialdemokratische Partei Deutschlands" / USPD) in 1917. Within the party she was regarded as a left winger, and as fragmentation on the political left continued to develop in 1920 she, like many of her party comrades, became a member of the recently launched Communist Party (identified in some contemporary sources for the next year or so as the United Communist Party / ''"Vereinigte Kommunistische Partei Deutschlands"'' / VKPD).

Elections were held on 10 February 1924 to the Thuringian Parliament ("Landtag") in which Agnes Schmidt won a seat, representing the Gotha electoral district for the Communist Party. She retained her place till 1927. For a time she was responsible for the Communist Party's policies on women's work in Thuringia.

In the context of the continuing internal ructions that were a feature of the Communist Party during the later 1920s Agnes Schmidt was initially seen as part of the leftwing, aligned with comrades such as Ruth Fischer and Arkadi Maslow. After 1925 she identified with the ultra-left together with Iwan Katz and her fellow Landtag member Otto Geithner. In March 1926, Geithner was excluded from the party because of the force of his opposition to the party leadership. Agnes Schmidt immediately resigned her own party membership in support of Geithner.

Geithner and Schmidt, together with the Landtag member Hans Schreyer, now set up an alternative communist party, the Communist Working Group ("Kommunistische Arbeitsgemeinschaft" / KAG). The name had already been used for an earlier breakaway party earlier in the decade, but that was by now defunct. In its new incarnation the KAG fared no better. In the Thuringia Landtag elections of 1927 they secured less than 1 in 200 of the votes cast, which was not enough to entitle them to any seats. Agnes Schmidt immediately resigned her own party membership in support of Geithner. After 1927, Agnes Schmidt, aged 52, withdrew from politics.
