= Werner Scholem =

German politician (1895–1940)

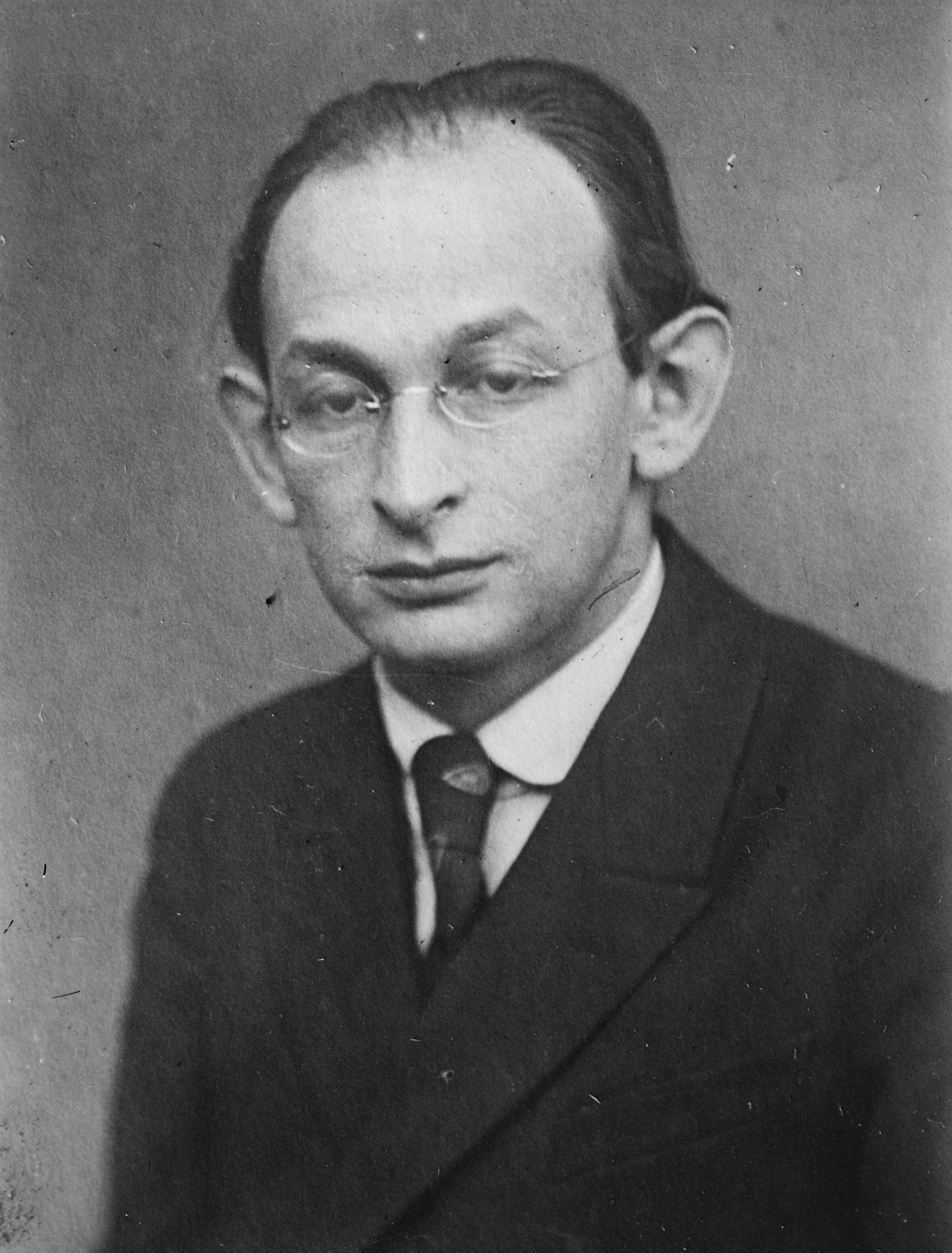
- Scholem c. 1924

Member of the Reichstag for Potsdam I
- In office 27 May 1924 – 1 July 1928
- Preceded by: Multi-member district
- Succeeded by: Multi-member district

Member of the Landtag of Prussia for Potsdam I
- In office 10 March 1921 – 5 January 1925
- Preceded by: Multi-member district
- Succeeded by: Multi-member district

Personal details
- Born: 29 December 1895 Berlin, Province of Brandenburg, Kingdom of Prussia, German Empire
- Died: 17 July 1940 (aged 44) Buchenwald concentration camp, Weimar, Thuringia, Nazi Germany
- Party: USPD (1917–1920); KPD (1920–1926)
- Other political affiliations: Left Communists (1926-1928); Leninbund (1928)
- Spouse: Emmy Wichelt (m. 1917)
- Relatives: Gershom Scholem (brother)
- Occupation: Politician; Journalist

Military service
- Allegiance: German Empire
- Branch/service: Imperial German Army
- Years of service: 1915–1917
- Battles/wars: World War I; Serbian Campaign (WIA)
- Central institution membership: 1924–1925: Full member, KPD Politburo; 1924–1925: Full member, KPD Central Committee (Note: Zentrale until 1925); Other offices held: 1922–1925: Organizational Leader, Berlin-Brandenberg KPD

Werner Scholem (29 December 1895 – 17 July 1940) was a German communist politician and journalist who served in the Landtag of Prussia from 1921 to 1925 and the Reichstag from 1924 to 1928. He was a leading member of the Communist Party of Germany from 1924 to 1925, part of a triumvirate alongside Ruth Fischer and Arkadi Maslow. He was executed in Buchenwald in 1940. Scholem and his wife, Emmy, were portrayed in the 2014 documentary "Between Utopia and Counter Revolution."

== Background ==
Scholem was born on December 29, 1895, into a Jewish family in Berlin. His father was a print shop owner. His brother was Gershom Scholem.

In their youth, Werner and Gerhard (later Gershom) were members of the Zionist youth-movement "Jung Juda". Shortly before the outbreak of the First World War, Werner joined a socialist workers' youth group. During the war, both brothers debated the conflicts and common grounds of Zionism and socialism.

From the age of 16, Scholem became involved in journalism. In 1915, he was drafted into the German Army, and the following year was wounded during the Serbian campaign. In 1917, he joined the Independent Social Democratic Party (USPD) and was temporarily detained at Roter Ochse for insulting the Emperor and anti-war activities.

In the Gershom Scholem Collection at the National Library of Israel, there is a copy of Solomon Schecter's German book on Hasidism, "Die Chassidim", published in Berlin in 1904. The book contains the signature of Werner Scholem, and at some point, it came into the possession of his younger brother Gershom.

== Career ==
In 1919, Scholem worked in Halle (Saale), as editor of the Volksblatt.

In 1920, Scholem joined the Communist Party of Germany with the left wing of the USPD. In 1921, he became one of the Party's representatives to the Prussian Landtag. The same year, Scholem was entrusted with editing the party newspaper Die Rote Fahne (The Red Flag).

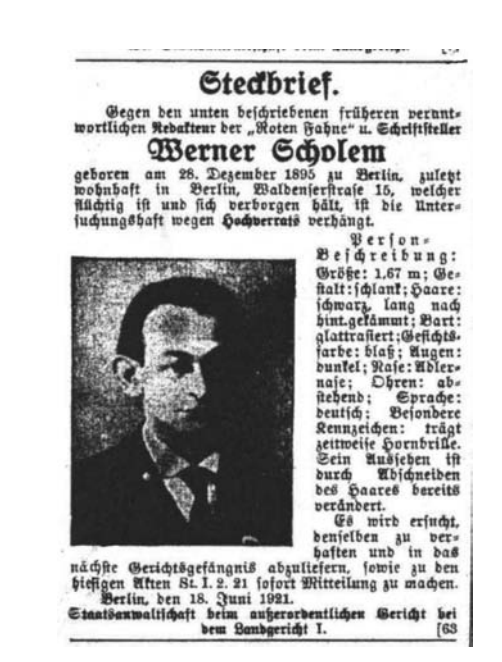
Wanted: Werner Scholem (1921)

A warrant was issued for his arrest only weeks later, on charges that he had sponsored the calls for workers to strike and to engage in violent uprisings against the state that March. Later, the charge that he supervised the publication of an article revealing the intentions of Germany to invade Polish territory in Silesia increased the potential severity of sentence—escalating the charge to treason. It later turned out that the documents reported in this article were forgeries although there was, in fact, something like a full-scale war going on in Silesia at that time, with German personnel in the fighting coming from the Freikorps. Perhaps the documents were forged in the sense that they had been written up by members of the Freikorps? Though plausible, no one can say, because the documents are not archived along with his court proceedings. The apparent counterfeiting did not reduce the threat of a long imprisonment for Scholem (who as a member of the Prussian Landtag was supposed to be immune from prosecution but had been exposed to this assault by a vote of the Landtag to permit it).

He was arrested on a train platform, as the editor responsible for an article of the Rote Fahne in September 1921 after having spent a few months in hiding. He was imprisoned for three and half months in a pre-trial detention center in the Moabit district of Berlin. His cellmate—a man named Ernst Krull—was a longtime member of one the Freikorps active in Silesia was suspected in the assassination of Rosa Luxemburg (leader of the German revolution). According to the prison staff, Krull was also being questioned in ongoing investigations into the assassination of Matthias Erzberger. (For context: Erzberger—alongside Rosa Luxemburg, Karl Liebknecht and Max Warburg—was the emblematic ‘November criminal’ of the Freikorps-style chauvinist mythos regarding the 'stab in the back' leading to the collapse of the Western Front in the exculpatory legend propagated by Hitler, Ludendorff and Hindenburg. A certain irony immanent in this situation presents itself when we consider that the Rote Fahne was initially founded as an organ for Socialist revolution in Germany by none other than Rosa Luxemburg.

This was neither Scholem's first, nor his last arrest: He had been briefly detained in 1917 for insulting the emperor, and he would spend years in various forms of detention and ultimately as the inmate of a concentration camp between the time of his arrest by the Gestapo in 1933 until his execution in 1940.

In subsequent years, Scholem worked in the party organization, mostly for the Berlin branch; he rose in the fallout from the failed German October. As the party's base disintegrated, the ultra-left faction rose and Scholem rose to the Reichstag on the basis of a radicalized, if reduced constituency. In 1924, he became the leader of the national organization, and consequently a member of the Political Bureau of the Communist Party. He also served as head of the information department of the Antimilitärischer Apparat, the party intelligence service. From 1924 to 1928, he was a member of the German Reichstag. He led the so-called Fischer-Maslow Group associated with the Comintern chairman Grigory Zinoviev, which formed the new "ultra-left" Communist Party leadership after the "right" wing of the party was removed in 1923 by the leaders of the time.

In August 1925, the new party leadership was sidelined—Stalin displaced the Scholem-Maslow-Fischer triumvirate with a new leader: Ernst Thälmann.

Scholem continued to function in his capacity as a deputy. Memorably in July 1926, he led a popular referendum to expropriate the property of the remaining nobility to pay off remaining German war debts but found himself increasingly marginalized within the party.

Scholem was expelled from the party in November 1926 after having co-sponsored the Declaration of the 700 against the oppression of the United Left Opposition in the Soviet Union. This episode led to a notable falling out with the Soviet dictator Josef Stalin, who insulted Scholem directly—calling him out by name—in a meeting of the Executive Committee of the Comintern. Scholem subsequently joined the group of Left Communists in the Reichstag and, in April 1928, founded with others a "Leninbund". This association grew to become one of the leading splinter Communist organizations in Germany. However, Scholem left the Leninbund within the year, and remained unaffiliated while still sympathizing with Trotskyist positions and the Left Opposition (LO). He frequently wrote articles for their newspaper Permanente Revolution.

In a novelization of his life written by a close communist party member from this period, Scholem is portrayed, sometimes tragically, sometimes more comedically, as a Soviet spy "in the service of the world revolution." He is said to have seduced Marie Luise von Hammerstein, daughter of the Chief of the Army High Command, Colonel General Kurt von Hammerstein, in order to extract her father's official secrets from her. This 'seduction' is supposed to have taken place during an early period in Scholem's career—General Hammerstein was later involved in discussions with Hindenburg about whether or not Hitler should be made Chancellor of Germany.

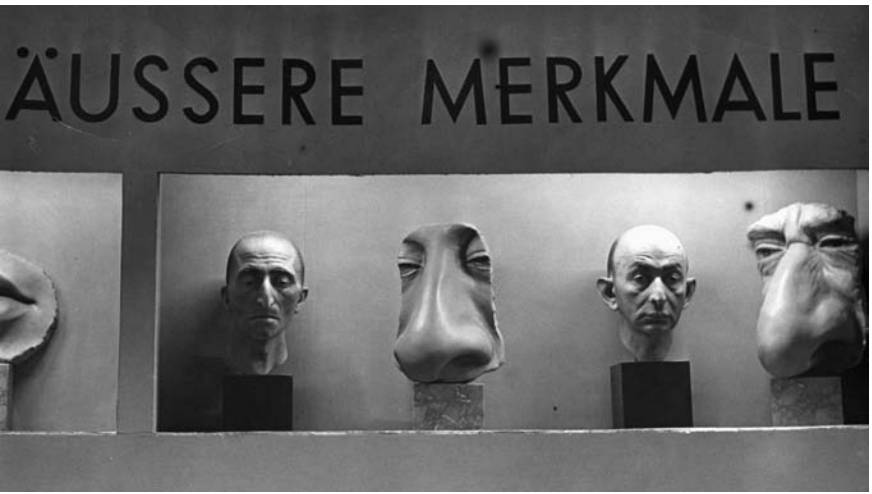
A bust of Werner Scholem's head (right) at the Nazi exhibition "The Eternal Jew" in Munich, 1937.

As a Jew and a communist, Scholem was arrested after the Nazi seizure of power by the Nazi Party in 1933, and he continued to be held in "preventative custody" until he was deported to Buchenwald in 1938. He was part of a group of former Reichstag members held at the concentration camp; their prominent status afforded them some degree of protection. However, in 1940, the SS singled out Scholem and another Jewish ex-Reichstag member, Ernst Heilmann, for execution. Heilmann was killed by injection, and Scholem was shot by Hauptscharführer Blank.

Reichminister of Propaganda Joseph Goebbels called out Werner Scholem by name during the 1935 Nuremberg Rally, in a speech that introduced the German people to the Third Reich's new laws on racial hygiene. The Nuremberg Rally, "was the public climax in the National Socialist calendar year," and had an almost cultic ceremonial significance under the Third Reich. During this speech, Goebbels spoke of Scholem as "the mastermind of the Red Flag."

In a letter to Werner's younger brother in Jerusalem written shortly thereafter—the 'Kabbalist of the Holy City', Gershom Scholem—their mother, Betty Scholem, remarked that on her most recent visit to see Werner at the Stalag IV-D concentration camp where he was being held at the time he asked her right away if she heard the radio broadcast of the speech in Nuremberg. Live audio of the rally had been blaring on the PA in the prison where he was being held all day that day when the speech, and everyone on the block turned to look at him when they heard his name spoken over the airwaves from the annual party rally.

A statue of Werner Scholem's head and nose were featured in a Nazi exhibition under the heading "The Eternal Jew" in 1937.

== Documentary ==
The life of Scholem and his wife, Emmy, is portrayed in the 2014 documentary "Between Utopia and Counter Revolution" (German: Zwischen Utopie und Gegenrevolution, with English subtitles) by Niels Bolbrinker. It features an interview with Renee Goddard talking about the arrest of her parents by the Nazis in 1933. Already in 2008, Renee Goddard was interviewed by German filmmaker Alexander Kluge, a feature that was shown on German TV under the title "Manche Toten sind nicht tot".

== Literature ==
=== Monographs ===
- Jay Howard Geller: The Scholems: A Story of the German-Jewish Bourgeoisie from Emancipation to Destruction (Ithaca: Cornell University Press 2019), ISBN 978-1-50173-156-3.
- Ralf Hoffrogge: A Jewish Communist in Weimar Germany. The Life of Werner Scholem (1895 – 1940) (Leiden: Brill Publications 2017), ISBN 978-9-00433-726-8 (Werner Scholem - eine politische Biographie (1895-1940) (Konstanz: UVK Konstanz, 2014), ISBN 978-3-86764-505-8).
- Mirjam Zadoff, Der rote Hiob: Das Leben des Werner Scholem (Munich: Hanser Verlag, 2014), ISBN 978-3-4462-4622-5.

=== Articles ===
- Gedenkstätte Buchenwald, ed., Buchenwald Concentration Camp 1937-1945: A Guide to the Permanent Historical Exhibition (Göttingen: Wallstein Verlag 2004), pp: 66–67, p. 119.
- Michael Buckmiller and Pascal Nafe, "Die Naherwartung des Kommunismus – Werner Scholem," in Judentum und politische Existenz (Hanover: Offizin-Verlag, 2000), pp: 61–82.
- Jay Howard Geller, "The Scholem Brothers and the Paths of German Jewry, 1914–1939," Shofar, vol. 30, no. 2 (Winter 2012): pp. 52-73.
- Jay Howard Geller, "The Scholem Family in Germany and German-Jewish Historical Context," in Scholar and Kabbalist: The Life and Work of Gershom Scholem, ed. Mirjam Zadoff and Noam Zadoff (Leiden: Brill, 2019), pp. 209-233.
- Ralf Hoffrogge, "Utopien am Abgrund. Der Briefwechsel Werner Scholem – Gershom Scholem in den Jahren 1914-1919," in Schreiben im Krieg – Schreiben vom Krieg. Feldpost im Zeitalter der Weltkriege, ed. Veit Didczuneit, Jens Ebert, and Thomas Jander (Essen: Klartext-Verlag, 2011), pp: 429-440, ISBN 978-3-8375-0461-3.
- Ralf Hoffrogge, "Emmy und Werner Scholem im Kampf zwischen Utopie und Gegenrevolution," Hannoversche Geschichtsblätter, Neue Folge vol. 65 (2011): pp. 157–176.
- Zvi Leshem, Werner Scholem, Gershom Scholem, Communism and Hasidism : Mystery of a Book, on the National Library of Israel Blog (Hebrew).
- Hermann Weber and Andreas Herbst, Deutsche Kommunisten. Biographisches Handbuch 1918 bis 1945, 2nd edition (Berlin: Karl Dietz Verlag, 2008), pp: 692–694, ISBN 3-320-02044-7.
- Mirjam Zadoff, "Unter Brüdern – Gershom und Werner Scholem. Von den Utopien der Jugend zum jüdischen Alltag zwischen den Kriegen," Münchner Beiträge zur jüdischen Geschichte und Kultur, vol. 1, no. 2 (2007), pp: 56–66.
