= Communist Working Group =

Communist Working Group may refer to:

- Communist Working Group (Germany) (1921–1922)
- Communist Working Group (Thuringia) (1927)
- Communist Working Groups, in Sweden (1971–1972)
