= Maria Backenecker =

German politician (1893–1931)

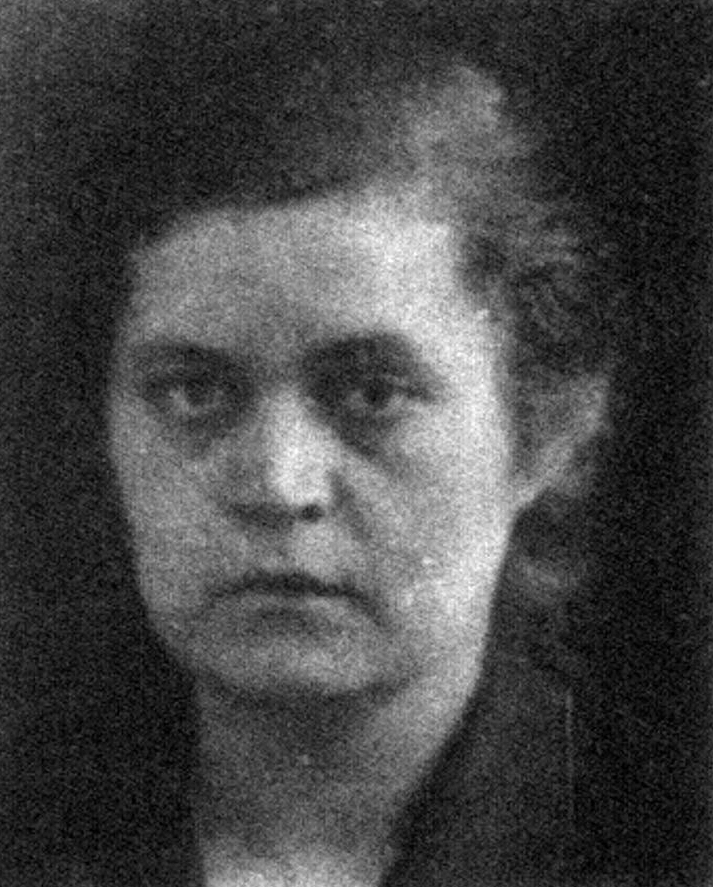
Backenecker c. 1924

Maria Backenecker (born Maria Scharnetzki; 20 March 1893 – 24 December 1931) was a German politician (KPD) and feminist activist. She was elected to the Reichstag (national parliament) in 1924, but was expelled from the party early in 1927 during the course of one of its periodic outbursts of internal division. Her life and political career were cut short by Tuberculosis.

== Life ==
Maria Scharnetzki was born in Bochum in the Prussian Province of Westphalia, then a booming industrial town located between Düsseldorf and Dortmund, and after marrying a man named Backenecker, spent her early adulthood as a working class housewife. During the turbulence that followed the First World War she joined the Independent Social Democratic Party (Unabhängige Sozialdemokratische Partei Deutschlands / USPD) which had split away from the mainstream Social Democratic Party a couple of years earlier, primarily on account of differences over whether or not to continue with support for the country's participation in the war. The USPD itself split in 1920. Maria Backenecker was an active participant in the process whereby the larger part of the USPD merged with the recently formed German Communist Party. In the years that followed she engaged in the Communist Feminist movement in the economically and politically important Ruhr region, which came under foreign military occupation a couple of years later. In 1924 she was elected to the Reichstag (national parliament) as a Communist Party member representing the eighteenth electoral district (Westpahlia South). However, the continuing economic pressures meant that 1924 was another year of acute austerity, and a second general election was triggered at the end of the year, which saw the Communist share of the vote falling back, with a corresponding reduction in the number of people on the party list gaining seats in the new legislature: Maria Backenecker was too low down on the party's list of candidates for her to retain her place in the Reichstag after the election of December 1924.

She remained politically active within the Communist Party, positioned firmly on the left wing of it. As a further internal split approached she found herself in opposition to the party leadership under Ernst Thälmann. She was excluded from the party in 1927. In 1928 she was one of around 6,000 founding members of the Leninbund, an alternative Communist Party composed largely of former members of the mainstream party who had been excluded from positions of influence or, as in Backenecker's case, from the party itself because Thälmann found them too left wing. However, when the Leninbund itself broke apart in a pattern that mirrored the conflict between Stalin and Trotsky that had played out in Moscow a couple of years earlier, Backenecker was one of those who followed Anton Grylewicz away from the Leninbund, and she became the leader of the Trotskyist Left wing opposition to the Communist Party in Hamborn.

While German politics became ever more extreme and polarised in the run up to the Nazi take-over in January 1933, Maria Backenecker herself died from Tuberculosis on 24 December 1931.
