= Ernst Schwarz (politician) =

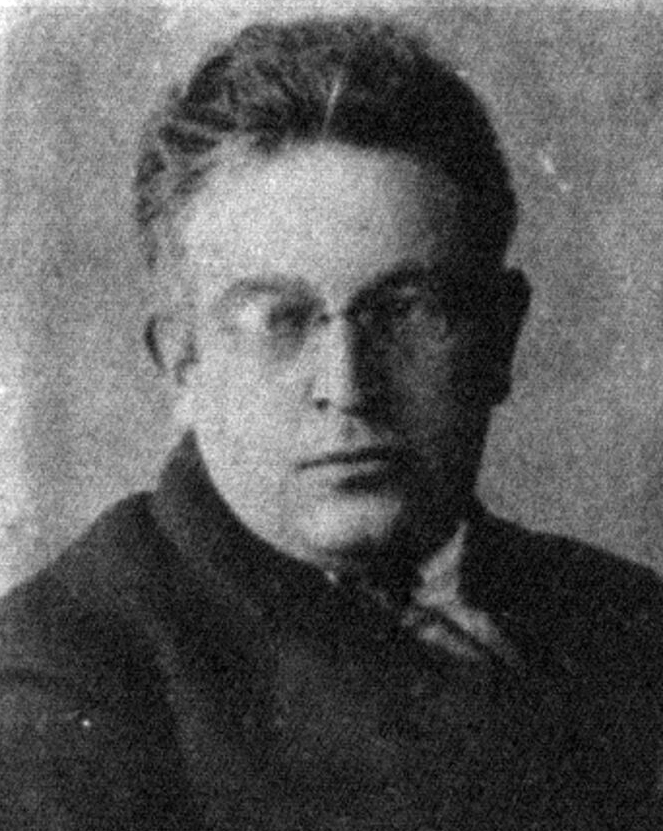
Schwarz's official Reichstag portrait, 1924

Ernst Schwarz (28 January 1886 in Landsberg an der Warthe, Brandenburg – May 29, 1958 in Twickenham) was a Communist politician.

After attending high school, first in his hometown and then in Berlin, Schwarz attended the University of Grenoble, University of Bonn and Berlin, graduating with a doctorate. During the First World War, he briefly served as a soldier. He became involved with the labour movement in Chemnitz, following the November Revolution. He joined the SPD and was there during the suppression of the Kapp Putsch in 1920. Radicalised by the experience he moved to the USPD, accepting the post of district secretary in Kiel. By the end of the year he was with the KPD.

In early 1921, he was District Secretary for Hesse-Cassel, but went underground following the March Action. He was arrested in Berlin at the end of 1921 and was held prisoner in Kassel for several months. By October 1922, Schwarz was employed as a teacher in Berlin and served as a left-wing member of the party leadership for the district of Berlin-Brandenburg. When Ruth Fischer and Arkadi Maslow formed a left-wing party leadership, he became a full-time party functionary running the party organisation in Thuringia. In May, and again in December 1924, Schwarz was elected Reichstag deputy for the KPD.

In 1925, as the internal struggles of the KPD evolved, Schwarz belonged to the ultraleft wing. He started to criticise the Soviet Union as a counter-revolutionary state. While the party was still under Maslow and Fischer he gave up his party duties and, by May 1926, with the rise of Ernst Thälmann to party leadership, he left the KPD completely. Together with Karl Korsch he formed the Entschiedene Linke group. He remained a member of the Reichstag, despite joining the anti-parliamentarian KAPD.

After the loss of the Reichstag seat in 1928, Schwarz returned to teaching. Rather than having any party position, he concentrated on the promotion of German-French understanding. After the Nazi takeover, Schwarz initially fled to France and then to Cuba, Mexico and the U.S.. In 1944, he took U.S. citizenship. Two years before his death he moved back to Germany, where he lived in Bad Godesberg.

== Works ==
- Deutsch-französischer Schüleraustausch (Echange interscolaire), Langensalza 1930
