= Anton Grylewicz =

German politician (1885–1971)

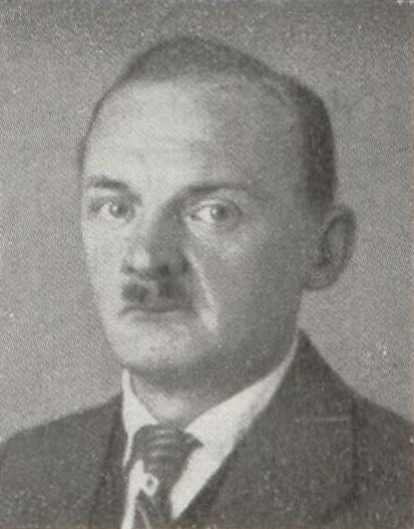
- Grylewicz c. 1925

Member of the Landtag of Prussia
- In office 5 January 1925 – 14 June 1928

Member of the Reichstag
- In office 27 May 1924 – 5 January 1925

Personal details
- Born: January 8, 1885 Berlin, German Empire
- Died: August 2, 1971 (aged 86) West Berlin, West Germany
- Party: SPD (1912–1917, after 1955); USPD (1917–1920); KPD (1920–1927); Left Communists (1927–1928); Leninbund (1928–1930); Left Opposition (1930–1933)
- Spouse: Anna-Maria Bräuer

Military service
- Allegiance: German Empire
- Years of service: 1915–1917; 1907–1909
- Battles/wars: First World War; Eastern Front
- Other offices held: 1920–1924: Organizational Leader, Berlin-Brandenberg KPD; 1920–1924: Member, Berlin City Council

Anton Grylewicz (8 January 1885 – 2 August 1971) was a German communist politician.

== Early life ==
Grylewicz was born into a working-class family in Berlin, where he finished school and was apprenticed as a locksmith. From 1907 to 1909 he did his military service and in 1912 he married Anna-Maria Bräuer, the same year he joined the Social Democratic Party of Germany (SPD). He was recalled to active duty in the army in 1915 and served for two years on the Eastern front until being injured.

He became a toolmaker in Berlin and joined the Independent Social Democratic Party (USPD) as well as the Revolutionary Stewards. During the revolution, Grylewicz became a deputy to Emil Eichhorn who had led an occupation of the Berlin police headquarters and become police chief.

== Communist Party Years ==
Grylewicz had become the chairman of the USPD's Greater Berlin district and a leader of the party's left by the time of the fusion conference with the Communist Party of Germany (KPD) and became secretary of the Berlin-Brandenburg organisation of the KPD. Grylewicz took part in the technical preparations in Moscow for the abortive 1923 uprising and was tried alongside Arkadi Maslow but was granted an amnesty. During this period he was also elected onto the KPD Zentrale, and was a KPD member of the Reichstag from 4 May to 20 October. When Maslow and Ruth Fischer were removed from the leadership of the KPD in 1926, he was removed from the Zentrale and was excluded from the party altogether after acting as a spokesman for the Left Opposition at 11th party conference.

== Oppositionist ==
Grylewicz was a founder member of the Leninbund and became the leading figure of its Trotskyist minority, eventually fusing with other groups to form the United Left Opposition of the KPD. During this time Grylewicz ran a publishing house for many of Trotsky's works.

When the Nazis came to power in 1933, the SA destroyed Grylewicz's home and private library and he fled to Czechoslovakia, first living in Reichenberg, then Prague. His wife was under arrest in early 1933 and only joined him in July.

== Later years ==
From 1937 Grylewicz dropped out of the Trotskyist movement without renouncing his views. He moved to France the same year where he was detained at the outbreak of World War II before receiving a visa from Cuba in 1941. In 1955 he returned to Berlin and rejoined the SPD.
