= Lenin League =

Lenin League Leninbund
- Leader: Hugo Urbahns
- Founded: April 1928
- Dissolved: De jure: February 1933; De facto: September 1939
- Split from: Communist Party of Germany
- Preceded by: Left Communists
- Newspaper: Volkswille
- Membership (1928): 6,000
- Ideology: Left communism Leninism; Factions: Trotskyism (until 1930)
- Political position: Far-left
- International affiliation: International Left Opposition (1928-1930); International Revolutionary Marxist Centre (1933-1935)

The Lenin League (German: Leninbund) was a German revolutionary socialist organisation that was active during the later period of the Weimar Republic. Founded in 1928 by former left communist members of the Communist Party of Germany (KPD), it experienced a number of splits over the years before going underground in the wake of the Reichstag fire and finally disappearing by the outbreak of World War II.

== History ==
The Lenin League was formed at the beginning of April 1928, its members (initially around 6,000) were mostly former members of the Communist Party of Germany (KPD) who were excluded from the party after the "ultra-left" and the left wing were ousted by the leadership under Ernst Thälmann.

Among them were several Left Communist members of the Reichstag and the Prussian Landtag and other prominent members of the party such as Ruth Fischer, Arkadi Maslow, Werner Scholem, Paul Schlecht, Hugo Urbahns and Guido Heym. The founding members expressed their solidarity with the positions of the United Opposition around Leon Trotsky and Grigory Zinoviev in the Soviet Union, and criticized various aspects of the policies of the Communist International and the Communist Party of the Soviet Union (e.g. the Stalinist line of "socialism in one country" and the alliance with the Kuomintang in China) as "revisionist deviations".

Before the 1928 German federal election, the organization experienced its first major split when, with the exception of Hugo Urbahns (who led the Lenin League to its end), all of its prominent politicians left the organization (because of the surrender of Grigory Zinoviev and Lev Kamenev to the majority positions in the USSR and the participation in the elections being seen as premature). The result of the 1928 election (0.26%; 80,230 votes) was therefore disappointing. The slow but steady process of disintegration soon became unstoppable, especially as the KPD violently attacked the Lenin League within the framework of the politics of the Third Period, where any non-Communist workers' organization was labeled as fascist. Individual members like Fritz Schimanski joined the KPD, and others like Guido Heym joined the SPD, so the Lenin League shrank to around 1,000 members. The Lenin League remained important only in a few localities, in Dortmund, Neu-Isenburg, Brunsbüttelkoog, and some cities of Brandenburg such as Bernau and Rathenow, where it was represented in the local parliaments. In the Rhineland and Berlin, some of Karl Korsch's supporters joined the organization after their own structures were formally dissolved. In 1930, however, the truly Trotskyist wing around Anton Grylewicz split after controversies over the question of the reformability of the KPD and the Comintern and the character of Soviet foreign policy, and formed under the name of "Left Opposition of the KPD". Recognizing early on the danger for the workers' movement of the growth of the National Socialist German Workers' Party (NSDAP), the Lenin League was involved in various attempts from 1930 onwards to build a united front of the SPD and KPD workers parties against fascism, which only succeeded in intensified cooperation with other small left-wing organizations such as the Communist Party of Germany (Opposition) (KPO) and Socialist Workers' Party of Germany (SAPD).

After several bans on its press in 1932 (the newspaper Volkswille, initially published daily in 1928, three times a week from 1928 to 1930, weekly from 1930 to 1932 and every two weeks until the final ban, and the theoretical organ, the Fahne des Kommunismus, every two weeks), the organization had to go underground after the Reichstag fire in 1933. Unlike other small left-wing organizations, however, the Lenin League failed to establish a functional foreign leadership (a group of exiles led by Hugo Urbahns existed in Stockholm) or centralized illegal structures. Regional Lenin League resistance groups were active in various regions such as Hamburg, Thuringia or the Ruhr area, often in cooperation with other leftist organizations. After the outbreak of World War II in 1939, their traces were lost.

== Members ==
- Erwin Ackerknecht
- Maria Backenecker
- Wolfgang Bartels
- Adam Ebner
- Eugen Eppstein
- Ruth Fischer
- Anton Grylewicz
- Guido Heym
- Oskar Hippe
- Karl Jahnke
- Georg Jungclas
- Georg Kenzler
- Otto Kilian
- Kurt Landau
- Arkadi Maslow
- Bruno Mätzchen
- Gustav Müller
- Jakob Ritter
- Katharina Roth
- Leo Roth
- Fritz Schimanski
- Paul Schlecht
- Werner Scholem
- Otto Schüssler
- Hugo Urbahns
- Otto Weber
- Oskar Wischeropp

== Bibliography ==
- Marcel Bois: Im Kampf gegen Stalinismus und Faschismus. Die linke Opposition der KPD in der Weimarer Republik (1924–1933). In: Kora Baumbach, Marcel Bois, Kerstin Ebert, Viola Prüschenk (Hrsg.): Strömungen: Politische Bilder, Texte und Bewegungen (= Rosa-Luxemburg-Stiftung: Manuskripte. 69 = Rosa-Luxemburg-Stiftung: DoktorandInnenseminar. 9). Dietz, Berlin 2007, ISBN 978-3-320-02128-3, S. 86–109, (PDF; 12,0 MB).
- Marcel Bois: Kommunisten gegen Hitler und Stalin. Die linke Opposition der KPD in der Weimarer Republik. Eine Gesamtdarstellung. Klartext, Essen 2014, ISBN 978-3-8375-1282-3 (Zugleich: Berlin, Technische Universität, Dissertation, 2014).
- Leo Trotzki: Die Verteidigung der Sowjetrepublik und die Opposition. Die Ultralinken und der Marxismus. Welchen Weg geht der Leninbund? Grylewicz, Berlin 1929, (historische Polemik von Trotzki gegen den Leninbund).
- Rüdiger Zimmermann: Der Leninbund. Linke Kommunisten in der Weimarer Republik (= Beiträge zur Geschichte des Parlamentarismus und der politischen Parteien. Bd. 62). Droste, Düsseldorf 1978, ISBN 3-7700-5096-7 (Zugleich: Darmstadt, Technische Hochschule, Dissertation, 1976).
