= Independent Workers' Party of Germany =

- Founded: 1950
- Dissolved: 1952
- Split from: Communist Party of Germany
- Merged into: Social Democratic Party of Germany
- Newspaper: Freie Tribüne
- Ideology: Titoism; Socialism
- Political position: Left-wing

The Independent Workers' Party of Germany (German: Unabhängige Arbeiterpartei Deutschlands, UAPD) was a short-lived communist party in West Germany. The UAPD was formed in 1950 as a split from the Communist Party of Germany by Titoists after he broke with the Soviet Union. Hoping to steer the party toward Trotskyism, the German section of the Fourth International, the International Communists of Germany (IKD) entered the UAPD. After fighting claims that it was secretly financed by Tito, the party disbanded in 1952. The Trotskyists then entered the Social Democratic Party (SPD).
