= Kurt Landau =

- Born: January 29, 1903; Vienna, Austria-Hungary
- Disappeared: September 23, 1937 (aged 34); Barcelona, Second Spanish Republic
- Political party: Communist Party of Austria (KPÖ), Leninbund, Workers' Party of Marxist Unification (POUM)
- Movement: Landau-Gruppe, International Left Opposition, Funke Gruppe

Kurt Landau (January 29, 1903 – on or shortly after September 23, 1937, Pseudonyms Agricola, Wolf Bertram, Spectator) was an Austrian communist, member of the International Left Opposition, author, and Trotskyist. He was murdered by agents of Stalin's NKVD during the Spanish Civil War.

== Life ==
Kurt Landau was born on 29 January 1903 in Vienna, the son of the wine merchant Abraham Simon (1872-1940 murdered in a concentration camp) and Rosa Feldmann (1878–1935). He studied in Vienna and joined the Währing section of the Communist Party of Austria (KPÖ) in 1921. He soon became the head of the Agit-Prop department and cultural editor of the party newspaper Rote Fahne. He began a relationship in 1923 with Julia Lipschutz (born 1895 or 1905, died after 1984), who became his wife under the name Katia Landau. He defended Leon Trotsky and his positions against those of the party line of the KPÖ and became one of the central figures in opposition to the slowly forming Stalinism. In 1927, he and like-minded colleagues were expelled from the party. In the same year he published the booklet The nature and history of anarcho-communism in Austria.

After being expelled from the KPÖ, Landau and other Left Opposition members, among them Josef Frey, formed the Austrian Communist Party (Opposition) KPÖ(O) and began to publish a paper called Arbeiterstimme (Workers' Voice), which should appear between January 1927 and August 1933. The group was plagued by factional disputes from the very beginning; Landau had been arguing in favor of the group considering itself a separate Communist Party instead of "just an opposition". Landau and his fellow travellers were expelled from the KPÖ(O) in April 1928 and formed a new group, Der Funke(de), and would publish 134 issues of the new paper "Der neue Mahnruf" (The new reminder). The group was centered around Graz, where it had more members than the Communist party. Landau was asked to go to Germany to try to bring together the various pro-Trotsky Left Opposition groups in that country. He left for Berlin in September 1929.

From 1929 he lived with his wife in Berlin and was a member of the Leninbund. The couple went into exile on 17 March 1933 in Paris and were heavily involved in the Linke Opposition der KPD (Landau-Gruppe).

In November 1936, Kurt and Katia Landau went to Barcelona, where they worked for the international secretariat of the POUM. Kurt Landau was the author of the brochure The German Revolution of 1918 and the Spanish Revolution of 1936 and was a member of staff on the party newspaper La Batalla and the German language broadcasts of Radio POUM. He escaped arrest on 17 June 1937 by the police and the Guardia de Asalto and found refuge first in the headquarters of the CNT, and then in the house of the POUM militant Carlota Durany.

He was kidnapped in Barcelona on 23 September 1937 and was never found. It is thought that he was abducted, tortured, and murdered by NKVD agents or German Communist Party members on orders. However, there is no indication of how and when exactly he died. There is a rumor that Walter Ulbricht was involved in the murder, or gave the command to this. The book 1993 Deadly Illusions, written after the release of the Soviet Archives, confirmed that Landau had been targeted for assassination by the NKVD, based on the notes of operative Alexander Orlov.

Katia Landau, who was also arrested, suspected that her husband had been taken to the Soviet Union. Katia Landau went on to marry the Spanish naval officer Benjamin Balboa (1901-1976), who in 1936 played a key role in ensuring that much of the Spanish navy did not join in the Spanish coup of 1936. Both would go into exile in Mexico in 1940. Until 1984, Katia Landau would campaign in the memory of Kurt Landau.

Kurt Landau's brother Alfred Landau was a socialist student leader in Vienna and later a high official of the United Nations.

== Works ==
- Wesen und Geschichte des Anarcho-Kommunismus in Österreich. Abschließende Bemerkungen zu den Fraktionskämpfen in der Kommunistischen Partei Österreichs (The nature and history of anarcho-communism in Austria. Final remarks on the faction fights in the Communist Party of Austria). Vienna 1927.
