= 1926 German property expropriation referendum =

20 June 1926
- Outcome: Proposal rejected due to low voter turnout

Results
Choice	Votes	%
Yes	14,447,891	96.11%
No	585,027	3.89%
Valid votes	15,032,918	96.41%
Invalid or blank votes	559,590	3.59%
Total votes	15,592,508	100.00%
Registered voters/turnout	39,707,919	39.27%
- Results by kreis

A referendum to expropriate the property of the former ruling houses was held in Germany on 20 June 1926. Although a majority of those who voted voted in favour, the voter turnout of 39% was too low for the proposal to pass into law.

== Background ==
The violent revolution of November 1918 had not settled the question of what to do with the property of Germany's now former ruling houses. Policy was left up to individual states, many of which made settlements involving some sort of seizure of property. The issue was settled indirectly on a federal level when the Weimar Constitution came into effect in August 1919. Article 153 stated that property could only be expropriated for public welfare and with appropriate compensation. The article was designed to protect property rights in general and was not directly aimed at solving the issue of princely expropriation. Nevertheless, it made the princes safe from the threat of losing their property without being compensated. In addition to this the courts of Germany had largely remained unchanged since the Imperial era and so usually sided with the princes when expropriation cases came up.

== Push for a referendum ==
The Communist and Socialist parties believed in expropriating the former ruling houses without giving compensation. Attempts to make this happen through the Reichstag always failed due to the opposition of the other parties. The liberal DDP and DVP, the Catholic Centre Party and the nationalist DNVP all saw such attempts as extremist attacks on property rights. The DVP and the DNVP also opposed these attempts due to their monarchist leanings, although both parties had relegated a restoration to a long-term goal by this stage, effectively recognising the republic. The Communists and the Socialists hoped that the public would be more sympathetic. By 1926, over 30,000 signatures expressing support for expropriation without compensation were gathered. This forced a referendum on the issue, under Article 73 of the Weimar Constitution.

On 15 March, President Hindenburg added a hurdle to the success of the referendum. On that day, he informed Justice Minister Wilhelm Marx that the intended expropriations did not serve the public interest but represented nothing more than fraudulent conversion of assets for political reasons. This was not permitted by the Constitution. On 24 April 1926, the Luther government expressly confirmed the President's legal opinion. For this reason, a simple majority was not sufficient for the success of the referendum, and it needed support from 50 percent of those eligible to vote, about 20 million voters. It was not expected that these numbers would be achieved.

== Results ==
The referendum was held on 20 June 1926. A large majority of those who voted voted in favour of expropriation without compensation. However, the Constitution required that a majority of all eligible voters had to vote in favour of a referendum proposal for it to become law. This did not happen due to low voter turnout.

Choice	Votes	%
For	14,447,891	96.11
Against	585,027	3.89
Total	15,032,918	100.00
Valid votes	15,032,918	96.41
Invalid/blank votes	559,590	3.59
Total votes	15,592,508	100.00
Registered voters/turnout	39,707,919	39.27
Source: Nohlen & Stöver

== See also ==
- Expropriation of the Princes in the Weimar Republic

== Bibliography ==
- Kaufman, Walter (1973), Monarchism in the Weimar Republic, New York: Octagon Books.
- Peukert, Detlev (1987), The Weimar Republic: The Crisis of Classical Modernity, New York: Hill and Wang.
- West, Franklin, (1985), A Crisis of the Weimar Republic: The German Referendum of 20 June 1926, Philadelphia: The American Philosophical Society.
