= Iwan Katz =

German politician

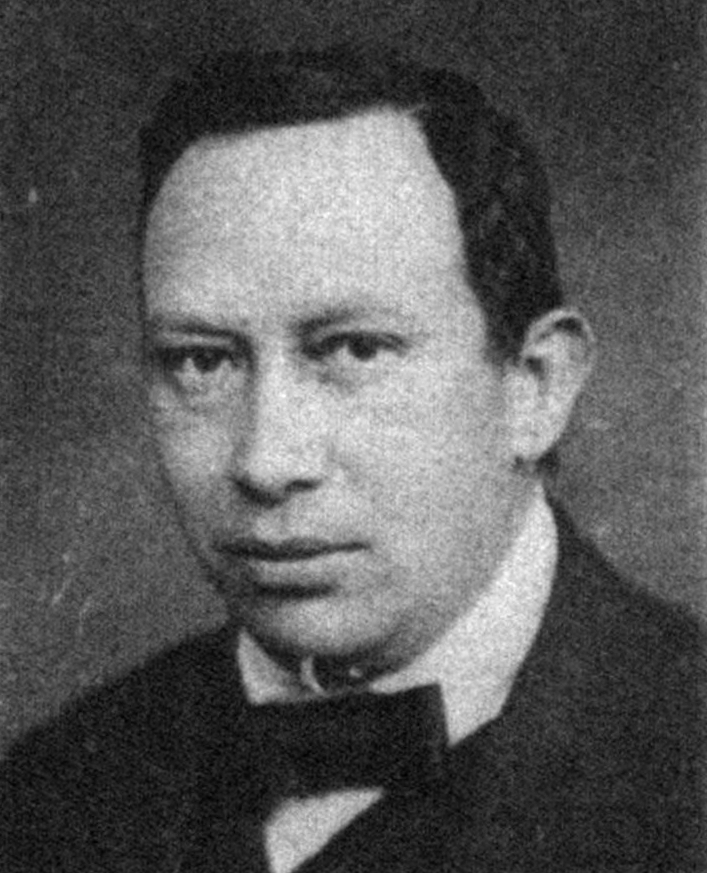
- Katz c. 1924

Member of the Reichstag for South Hanover–Braunschweig
- In office 27 May 1924 – 1 July 1928
- Preceded by: Multi-member district
- Succeeded by: Multi-member district

Member of the Landtag of Prussia for South Hanover–Braunschweig
- In office 10 March 1921 – 27 May 1924
- Preceded by: Multi-member district
- Succeeded by: Multi-member district

Personal details
- Born: 1 February 1889 Hannover, Province of Hanover, Kingdom of Prussia, German Empire
- Died: 20 September 1956 (aged 67) Castagnola-Cassarate, Lugano (TI), Switzerland
- Party: SPD (before 1919, 1949–1950); USPD (1919–1920); KPD (1920–1926, 1945–1946); SED (1946–1949); UAPD (after 1950)
- Other political affiliations: AAUE (1926); Left Communists (1926–1928)
- Spouse: Anna Kerwel (m. 1913)
- Parents: Gustav Katz (father); Johanna Magnus (mother)
- Education: Humboldt University of Berlin; University of Würzburg; University of Hanover
- Occupation: Politician

Military service
- Allegiance: German Empire
- Branch/service: Imperial German Army
- Years of service: 1912; 1914–1918
- Rank: Leutnant
- Commands: 2nd Machine Gun Company
- Battles/wars: World War I
- Central institution membership: 1924–1926: Full member, KPD Politburo; 1924–1925: Full member, KPD Zentrale; Other offices held: 1919: Member, Hanover City Council

Iwan Katz (1 February 1889 - 20 September 1956) was a German politician (SPD, USPD, KPD, AAUE, SED and UAPD). In many ways, the period of his greatest influence - within the Communist Party and after his expulsion from it in 1926 - came between 1924 and approximately 1927. Between 1924 and 1928 he served as a member of parliament (Reichstags Mitglied). On account of his record of activism he was subject to persecution during the twelve Hitler years, spending the years from 1941–1944 in concentration camps. He nevertheless survived became a post-war force in the politics both of Berlin and, until serious heart disease caused his retirement in 1954, in East and West Germany more broadly.

== Life ==
=== Provenance and early years ===
Iwan Katz was born in Hannover, son of the Jewish businessman Gustav Katz and his wife, born Johanna Magnus. He himself identified his confessional status as "without religion". He attended "Gymnasia" (secondary schools) successively in Osnabrück, Dortmund and Linden, before moving on to a broadly based university-level education. Katz attended universities at Berlin, Würzburg and Hannover. During 1909 he broke off his university studies and spent a year working in the Metals Industry. Subjects he studied included Jurisprudence, Applied Economics, Statistics and Medicine. His own curriculum vitae refers to his having obtained a doctorate, but it has not been possible to find any details or corroboration for his having obtained the degree. In 1911 Katz took a position as a research assistant at the Statistical Office in Hannover. The next year he undertook and completed his military service.

=== Politics and Marriage ===
Katz had become active in the labour movement while still at school, in 1906. In 1907 he was elected chairman of the SPD-affiliated Young Workers' Association ("Arbeiterjugendverein") for North-West Germany. By 1913, despite his young age, he had emerged as an activist member of the Social Democratic Party (SPD).

During 1913 Iwan Katz married Anna Kerwel (1879–1947). Anna was the daughter of a former army officer who had been dismissed from the Imperial Army on account of his political activities. Anna Kerwel's father was another member of the Social Democratic Party.

=== War ===
During the First World War, which broke out at the end of July 1914, Iwan Katz served on the frontline as a Leutnant (junior officer) and company commander with the Second Machine-gun Company of the 74th Infantry Regiment. (It seems likely that he had been listed as part of the military reserve ever since undergoing his Military Service in 1912.) He also became a staff officer.

As the end of the war approached, two months before the signing of the armistice, Iwan Katz assumed a leading position, as "Geschäftsführer", of the Demobilisation Committee for Hannover in September 1918.

=== Politics, and ructions on the left ===
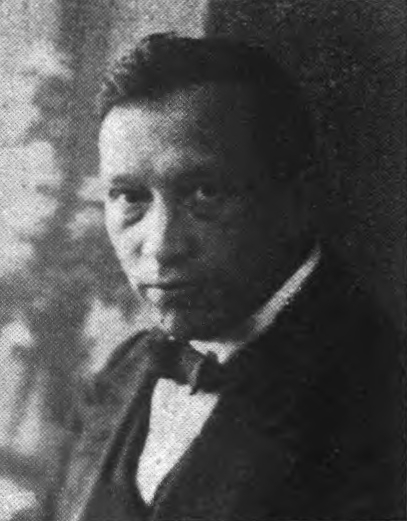
Katz's official Landtag portrait, 1921

Three months after the outbreak of the rash of revolutionary outbreaks that swept across the cities and towns of Germany following the abdication, Katz became a Hannover city councillor in February 1919. Unlike many of those who would come to prominence as leading figures of the political extreme left in Germany during the 1920s, Katz had not at this stage switched his party allegiance to the anti-war Independent Social Democratic Party. It was as a member of the SPD that in June 1919 he attended the party's party congress at Weimar, a small town which had acquired a hitherto implausible degree of political significance earlier in the year.

At the end of 1919, however, Iwan Katz did indeed move across to the Independent Social Democratic Party (USPD). The USPD was by this stage rapidly approaching its own moment of truth, however. In October 1920 Katz and his wife attended the party conference in Halle as delegates. it turned out to be the conference at which the party effectively broke apart. Following a crucial vote, a minority of the members returned to the mainstream Social Democratic Party (SPD). Iwan Katz was part of the majority that stayed with what became known, briefly, as the USPD (Linke / Left) and then, in December 1920, merged with the recently formed Communist Party. (The merged party was briefly rebranded as the "United Communist Party ..." / "Vereinigte Kommunistische Partei ...".) He continued to be an activist city councillor in Hannover, where he was viewed as a left-wing member of his party, working closely with comrades such as Berthold Karwane and Theodor Gohr.

=== Prussian Parliament (Landtag) ===
In February 1921 Katz was elected to membership of the Prussian parliament. The (United) Communist Party won 31 of the 421 seats in the "Landtag" (assembly). Iwan Katz occupied one of them, representing the party in the parliament till 1924, when he made the switch to national politics. During the early 1920s Katz established himself as one of the Communist Party's most popular and most effective public speakers, and as a comrade with a tendency to advocate radical solutions. He thereby came to the attention of the national party leadership and in 1922 was appointed to take over at the "Kommunalabteilung", the national department with responsibility for oversight of the party's regional and municipal organisations. At the party's 8th congress, held in Leipzig between 29 January and 1 February 1923, he was able to report back to comrades and present his programme for the party's first housing policy. Katz himself was no longer responsible for the department by the end of the year, however: this may have been in some way connected with his arrest in August 1923.

The arrest came about in the context of a wave of strikes across the country, triggered by intensifying economic hardship. Iwan Katz delivered a speech in Hannover which was believed by the authorities to have caused or contributed to serious street disturbances. It is not clear how long he was detained. More serious and sustained street disturbances erupted in Hamburg a couple of months later, over three days towards the end of October 1923. The so-called Hamburg Uprising was deemed a failure for the Communist Party. It frightened the government, which outlawed the party (to little obvious effect) for several months. But a spontaneous German re-run of Russia's 1917 "October Revolution", after which many of the more radical comrades yearned, failed to materialise. Political divisions on the political left, most obviously between the Communist Party and the centre-left SPD were intensified, and among the Communist party leaders the more extreme pro-Moscow factions strengthened their position following the fall from favour of the party leadership team of Heinrich Brandler and August Thalheimer, both of whom found themselves invited to relocate to Moscow in January 1924. A new leadership collective emerged for the party in Germany, which included the charismatic Ernst Thälmann, a staunch Stalin ally. Iwan Katz also found himself a member of the party leadership team at a national level. At the 9th party congress, which took place in April 1924, and was held that year in Frankfurt am Main, Iwan Katz was elected to the fifteen member Central Committee. Within it, he also joined the party politburo.

=== German parliament (Reichstag) ===
In May 1924 and again in December 1924 Iwan Katz was elected a Communist member of the national parliament ("Reichstag"), representing Electoral District 16 (South Hannover & Braunschweig). As a member of the German party's fractious leadership team, towards the end of 1924 or early in 1925 he was sent to Moscow to as party delegate to the Comintern. He used his networking skills to establish closer relations with leadership comrades in the Soviet party, although his networking seems to have been conducted chiefly on behalf of left-wing comrades in Germany, including the future party leader Ernst Thälmann. As factional rivalries within the leadership of the German party intensified during 1925 Ruth Fischer, formally the party leader, recalled Katz from Moscow and removed him from his Comintern role during the summer. Soon after Katz returned Fischer was ordered to travel to Moscow, which effectively ended her role as party leader, though it can be hard to pin down a precise date on which her leadership ended. Thälmann very quickly emerged as the strong man of the party.

=== Communist dissenter ===
When the 10th party congress, held in Berlin during July 1925, elected a new Party Central Committee, Iwan Katz was no longer included on the list. He was nevertheless still a member of the "Reichstag". Katz by now had little time for parliamentary government, however. Of greater significance than his seat in the Reichstag was the strong support he enjoyed from his local party in the Hannover region. He now emerged as a highly effective critic and organiser from the anti-parliamentarian ultra-leftist wing within the party. He also began to criticise the Soviet Union on account of its perceived commitment to "state capitalism". Applying his oratorical skills, and with the support on his friends and political allies Berthold Karwane and Theodor Gohr, he sustained his support among a majority party comrades in the Hannover, despite causing annoyance in some quarters by imputing depravity to Paul Grobis, a Central Committee loyalist, whom he characterised as "ein verkommenes Subjekt". Matters came to a head on 11 January 1926. It was widely assumed to be at Katz's instigation that a group of his supporters invaded and occupied the editorial offices of the "Niedersächsische Arbeiterzeitung", the party's regional newspaper. A series of fights broke out, and eventually it was only after calling in the local police that the editorial management (who were Central Committee loyalists) got their newspaper back. Iwan Katz was expelled from the Communist Party on 12 January 1926. Between January and November 1926 he sat in the "Reichstag" as an independent "fraktionslos" member.

Katz now launched his own Newssheet in Hannover. He enhanced his reputation within the party hierarchy as a trouble maker by using it to publish internal communications produced by the party. The newssheet appeared between March and December during 1926, with a print-run in March of 1,500, which was doubled in April to 3,000 copies. Katz and his group of noisy supporters in the Hannover area quickly came to be known as a "Linke KPD" (loosely, "Communist Party of the left"), or simply as the "Katz Group". Other soubriquets would follow.

On 26 June 1926 Katz teamed up with Franz Pfemfert and the AAUE - itself a breakaway organisation from the Communist Party - to form the "Spartakusbund der linkskommunistischen Organisationen" ("Spartakus League of left-communist organisations"), which presented itself as the extreme left-wing of the communist movement. This organisation was quietly dissolved during 1927, although extreme left-wing political organisations with names that referenced the Spartacus League of 1914-1919 continued to surface from time to time.

During 1926 and 1927 Ernst Thälmann strengthened his leadership and control over the party. The leadership team that surrounded him became increasingly exasperated with the shrill criticism from Katz and other former party stalwarts who were now out of line. Clara Zetkin, who by this stage enjoyed something close to iconic status among the party faithful, was on record with her characterisation of Iwan Katz as "Schurke oder Psychopath" ("a rogue or a psychopath"), and took to referring to him as "Ivan the Terrible". Others followed her lead. Katz also came under pressure to resign his seat in the "Reichstag", given that he had secured his election as a leading member of the Communist Party, from which he was now excluded. Despite his increasingly open anti-parliamentarianism, Katz resisted such pressure, and remained a member of the German parliament as a "Left Communist" till the 1928 election. He had never been a particularly active parliamentarian, however, and after the dissolution of the Spartakusbund der linkskommunistischen Organisationen" during the first part of early 1927, he was hardly ever to be seen in the Reichstag building.

During 1927 he became increasingly involved with a management position in the social welfare office for Berlin-Wedding, where he continued to work till his removal from office on 16 March 1933. He frequented anti-fascist intellectual circles and was actively engaged during this period with the "Society of the friends of the new Russia" ("Gesellschaft der Freunde des neuen Rußland").

=== Under National Socialism ===
In January 1933 the Hitler government took power and lost no time in transforming Germany into a one-party populist-racist dictatorship. Both on account of his high-profile record as a Communist leader and because of his Jewish provenance, Iwan Katz was high on the list of those at risk. The Law for the Restoration of the Professional Civil Service would be passed into law only on 7 April 1933, but three weeks before that, and just two days after being dismissed from his social welfare job on 16 March 1933, Iwan Katz was arrested and placed in "protective custody" in a concentration camp near Berlin. He was released, however, towards the end of 1933. He owed his release to a personal intervention by Interior Minister Wilhelm Frick. The two men had worked together during 1924/25 as members of the Amnesty Commission which had dealt with political detainees from the Communist and National Socialist movements who had been arrested in the context of the street violence of the early 1920s.

Although Wilhelm Frick retained his position as Interior Minister till 1943, he became increasingly semi-detached from the true believers surrounding Adolf Hitler, and it is unlikely that by 1941 he would have enjoyed sufficient influence to protect Katz. By that time most politically engaged Germans who had presented a pro-Soviet high-profile before 1933, especially if identified by the regime as Jewish, had either escaped abroad or been taken out of circulation by the authorities. In 1941 it became Iwan Katz's turn again: he was arrested again and transferred to a forced-labour camp. Shortly after that he spotted an opportunity to escape and took it. He now lived in hiding "underground" (without a registered residence address) in Berlin, concealed by his friend the artist Bettina von Arnim at her Berlin apartment and later at her out-of-town manor house and sometime artists' colony, Schloss Wiepersdorf.

Following a report by a Gestapo spy he was found and arrested by the security services in May 1944 and taken to the Auschwitz concentration camp. Anna Katz protested against the inhuman treatment to which her husband was subjected while being transported to the camp, and was herself arrested, apparently as a result of this. She was taken to the women's concentration camp at Ravensbrück. Irwin Katz himself was at some stage transferred from Auschwitz to the Mauthausen concentration camp near Linz.

At the beginning of April 1945, a few weeks before the war ended, and struggling with a desperate shortage of skilled labour thanks to the slaughter of war, the army authorities conscripted Iwan Katz out of the concentration camp to work as an army doctor for the units in the town. It is not clear whether he had ever acquired any practical medical experience up to this point, but Medicine had been one of the subjects he had studied at university three and a half decades earlier. On 20 April 1945, he was promoted to the post of Chief Physician to the German units stationed in Mauthausen. Sources pay tribute to his role in ensuring that when U.S. troops arrived early in May 1945 the Fortress of Mauthausen was handed over without a shot being fired from either side. Katz stayed on as a physician between 6 May and 7 June 1945, attending to his fellow-survivors from the vast concentration camp, now employed not by the German military but by the American army of occupation.

=== After the war in Berlin's Soviet sector ===
He then returned to Berlin and re-joined the no longer outlawed Communist Party which had expelled him two decades earlier. He made his home in the eastern part of Berlin which had been placed under Soviet military occupation in May 1945. Following the contentious party merger of April 1946 in the Soviet occupation zone Katz was one of the hundreds of thousand communist party members who quickly signed their party membership over top the new Socialist Unity Party ("Sozialistische Einheitspartei Deutschlands" / SED), which was presented as a way to ensure that political divisions on the left would never again leave a path open for a return to power of populist nationalism. (In the western occupation zones the political merger that created the SED was widely seen as a proxy for Soviet imperial ambitions, and never gained significant traction with voters.) It only emerged some time later that political developments in the Soviet zone were already being choreographed on behalf of the Soviet party by Walter Ulbricht and the thirty man nation building team that had been flown into Berlin directly from Moscow, where they had spent the war years, on 30 April 1945. Ulbricht and most of his comrades had been active in the party during the 1920s and were familiar with the disruptive career within the party of Iwan Katz during the later 1920s. He attempted to ensure that Iwan Katz's application for a job with the Berlin city administration should be blocked. Katz was nevertheless successful in his application, in part due a provision already agreed between the military administrators from the four powers with oversight of the city, whereby former public officials who had suffered significant adverse treatment by the government and its agencies under the National Socialists - as Katz clearly had - should be entitled to reinstatement.

Katz believed he was particularly well equipped to act as a mediator, both between members of the much diminished (in the Soviet zone) SPD and the SED, and between representatives of the four occupying powers. He was indeed occasionally employed as a mediator by both the Soviets and by the Americans. A case in point arose in 1947 following the election of the SPD mayoral candidate, Ernst Reuter as "Oberbürgermeister" ("chief mayor") of (the whole of) Berlin. The constitutional details of the city's administration had not yet been agreed between the occupying powers, and when the time came for the military administrators to endorse Reuter's appointment, the Soviet military sought instead to veto it, thereby triggering a major crisis. After securing the agreement of Hermann Matern, a leading figure in the SED, Iwan Katz entered into negotiations with Franz Neumann (Politiker) and Kurt Mattick, two leaders of the SPD in Berlin, about a possible recognition of Reuter's election by both the SPD and SED. It appears that Katz was one of those inclined to over-estimate the freedom of manoeuvre in constitutional matters that the SED leadership enjoyed between 1945 and 1949 under the Soviet military; is not clear what impact, if any, his involvement could have had on the unstable compromise that emerged over the Berlin mayoralty, which marked a further step along the path towards the physical division of Berlin into Eastern and Western sectors. In any case, for Iwan Katz personal tragedy intervened on 10 January 1947 when Anna Katz died as a result of the treatment she had sustained at Ravensbrück. Iwan Katz was able to publish a suitable obituary in the recently launched mass-circulation party newspaper, Neues Deutschland.

Over the next couple of years Iwan Katz's relationship with the party nevertheless deteriorated further. His outspoken approach no doubt reminded Walter Ulbricht and other party stalwarts of the same generation as the leader why Katz had been excluded from the party in 1926. He was openly critical of the twelve month Soviet blockade of Berlin launched in June 1948, sharing his opinion robustly with fellow delegates at a regional party conference at Zehlendorf at the end of the year, also taking the opportunity to launch an attack on the government's latest "two year plan". By this time, as a result of his newly rediscovered appetite for opposition, Katz was "under party investigation". On 21 December 1948 the man who had been dismissed from public office by the Hitler government in March 1933 was dismissed from office for a second time, this time by the Ulbricht government, a new kind of one party dictatorship. The irony is not lost on commentators. Approximately eleven weeks later, on 14 March 1949, Iwan Katz resigned his party membership. Two months after that, on 12 May 1949, he re-joined the SPD.

It was also on 12 May 1949 that the Soviets lifted the Berlin Blockade. It is unclear whether Katz took the opportunity to relocate to the newly launched state of West Germany or remained for another few years in the Soviet occupation zone (relaunched and rebranded in October 1949 as the Soviet sponsored German Democratic Republic). What is known is that he greeted with enthusiasm the launch of the short-lived "Titoist" Independent Workers' Party ("Unabhängige Arbeiterpartei Deutschlands" / UAPD) which had its formal founding congress at Worms (in West Germany) on 25 March 1951. By the time of its launch Katz was already a member of the UAPD, having joined it, according to at least one source, during 1950.

=== Final years ===
During 1954 his cardiac cindition began to deteriorate rapidly and Iwan Katz retired to Castagnola by the lake at Lugano in order to try and preserve his health. It was at Castagnola that he died of heart failure on 20 September 1956.
