= Communist Working Group (Thuringia) =

Communist faction in Thuringia, Germany

The Communist Working Group (German: Kommunistische Arbeitsgemeinschaft, abbreviated KAG) was a political faction in Thuringia, Germany. KAG was founded by the Landtag of Thuringia members Otto Geithner, Agnes Schmidt and Hans Schreyer, whom had constituted an ultra-left faction in the Communist Party of Germany (KPD). Geithner and Schreyer had been expelled from KPD, whilst Schmidt resigned from the party to join KAG.

KAG fielded a list in the 30 January 1927 Landtag election, headed by Geithner, Schmidt and Schreyer. The KAG list failed to get any deputies elected, obtaining 3,732 votes (0.46%). Following the KAG electoral debacle, Schreyer joined the Social Democratic Party of Germany (SPD) whilst Schmidt withdrew from politics. Geithner joined Socialist Workers Party of Germany (SAP) in 1931.
