= 1924 Prussian state election =

Prussian state election

- 7 December 1924
- All 450 seats in the Landtag of Prussia; 226 seats needed for a majority
- Turnout: 78.7% (▲1.2pp)
| Party | Vote % | Seats | +/– |
|---|---|---|---|
| Social Democratic Party | 24.9% | 114 | 0 |
| German National People's Party | 23.7% | 109 | +34 |
| Center Party | 17.6% | 81 | 0 |
| German People's Party | 9.8% | 45 | −13 |
| Communist Party | 9.6% | 44 | +13 |
| German Democratic Party | 5.9% | 27 | +1 |
| National Socialist Freedom Movement | 2.5% | 11 | New |
| Economic Party | 2.5% | 11 | +7 |
| German-Hanoverian Party | 1.4% | 6 | −5 |
This lists parties that won seats. See the complete results below.
Results by electoral constituency
| Minister-President before | Minister-President after |
|---|---|
| Second Braun cabinet SPD–Z–DVP–DDP | Marx cabinet SPD–Z–DDP |

State elections were held in the Free State of Prussia on 7 December 1924 to elect all 450 members of the Landtag of Prussia. The results left the seat count of the governing coalition of the Social Democratic Party (SPD), Centre Party, and German Democratic Party almost flat, with most movement happening amongst the opposition. The German National People's Party made significant gains, nearly surpassing the SPD as the largest party. Most of the Independent Social Democratic Party (USPD) had merged back into the SPD in 1922, leaving behind only a small rump party that did not receive enough votes to return any members to the Landtag. The German People's Party lost a portion of the gains it had made in the previous election. The National Socialist Freedom Party, a disguised rebirth of the Nazi Party formed after it was banned following the Beer Hall Putsch, won 2.5% of the vote and 11 seats.

== Results ==
| Party | Votes | % | Swing | Seats | +/– |
|---|---|---|---|---|---|
| Social Democratic Party (SPD) | 4,575,645 | 24.89 | –1.37 | 114 | 0 |
| German National People's Party (DNVP) | 4,355,674 | 23.70 | +5.62 | 109 | +34 |
| Centre Party | 3,229,740 | 17.57 | +0.33 | 81 | 0 |
| German People's Party (DVP) | 1,797,589 | 9.78 | –4.40 | 45 | –13 |
| List of Communists (KPD) | 1,767,932 | 9.62 | +2.21 | 44 | +13 |
| German Democratic Party (DDP) | 1,083,523 | 5.90 | –0.07 | 27 | +1 |
| National Socialist Freedom Party (NSFP) | 454,886 | 2.47 | New | 11 | New |
| Economic Party of the German Middle Classes (WP); Economic Party of the German Middle Classes (WP); Farmers and Creative Professions | 454,409; 440,212; 14,674 | 2.47; 2.40; 0.08 | +1.29 +1.22; New | 11; 11; 0 | +7 +7; New |
| German-Hanoverian Party; German-Hanoverian Party (DHP); Greater German-Hessian League | 259,506; 258,198; 1,308 | 1.41; 1.40; 0.01 | –1.27 –1.11; New | 6; 6; 0 | –5 –5; New |
| German Social Party and Reichsbund for Revaluation | 111,939 | 0.61 | New | 0 | New |
| National Minorities of Germany (NMD); Poland Party; Schleswiger Association; Wendish Party; Masurian Association | 87,891; 80,751; 5,404; 1,255; 481 | 0.48; 0.44; 0.03; 0.01; 0.00 | +0.38 +0.37; 0.00; New; New | 2; 2; 0; 0; 0 | +2 +2; 0 New; New |
| Independent Social Democratic Party (USPD) | 67,871 (Note: The list "Independent Social Democratic Party of Germany" in constituency 13 (Schleswig-Holstein) won 3,655 votes, but was not affiliated with the state party list.) | 0.37 | –6.21 | 0 | –28 |
| German Revaluation and Construction Party | 41,280 | 0.22 | New | 0 | New |
| Christian Social National Community of Germany | 37,679 | 0.20 | New | 0 | New |
| Party for People's Welfare (Tenant Protection and Land Rights) | 27,582 | 0.15 | New | 0 | New |
| Revaluation and Reconstruction Party | 13,616 | 0.07 | New | 0 | New |
| Free Economic Union F.F.F. (Freiland-Freigeld) | 13,523 | 0.07 | New | 0 | New |
| Invalid/blank votes | 337,562 | 1.80 | – | – | – |
| Total | 18,380,285 | 100 | – | 450 | +22 |
| Registered voters/turnout | 23,819,471 | 78.58 | +1.18 | – | – |
Gonschior.de

Popular Vote
| SPD | 24.89% |
| DNVP | 23.70% |
| Centre | 17.57% |
| DVP | 9.78% |
| KPD | 9.62% |
| DDP | 5.90% |
| NSFP | 2.47% |
| WP | 2.47% |
| DHP | 1.41% |
| NMD | 0.48% |
| Other | 1.71% |

Landtag seats
| SPD | 25.33% |
| DNVP | 24.22% |
| Centre | 18.00% |
| DVP | 10.00% |
| KPD | 9.78% |
| DDP | 6.00% |
| NSFP | 2.44% |
| WP | 2.44% |
| DHP | 1.33% |
| NMD | 0.44% |

=== Results by constituency ===
| Constituency | SPD | DNVP | Z | DVP | KPD | DDP | NSFP | WP | DHP | NMD |
|---|---|---|---|---|---|---|---|---|---|---|
| 1. East Prussia | 20.8 | 39.1 | 8.0 | 9.0 | 8.1 | 4.0 | 6.2 | 1.0 | – | 0.6 |
| 2. Berlin | 32.5 | 21.9 | 4.1 | 4.9 | 19.3 | 10.1 | 1.6 | 3.4 | – | 0.3 |
| 3. Potsdam II | 26.7 | 27.7 | 3.5 | 8.5 | 11.6 | 12.5 | 2.9 | 3.8 | – | 0.1 |
| 4. Potsdam I | 30.4 | 31.3 | 2.5 | 7.8 | 12.2 | 6.2 | 2.8 | 5.1 | – | 0.1 |
| 5. Frankfurt an der Oder | 27.9 | 38.2 | 6.3 | 10.9 | 4.4 | 4.7 | 3.2 | 2.2 | – | 0.7 |
| 6. Pomerania | 24.6 | 49.1 | 1.0 | 6.5 | 5.8 | 3.8 | 4.2 | 3.9 | – | 0.1 |
| 7. Breslau | 31.9 | 28.8 | 19.2 | 7.7 | 3.1 | 4.6 | 1.4 | 1.4 | – | 0.1 |
| 8. Liegnitz | 32.8 | 28.9 | 9.0 | 8.3 | 3.3 | 8.0 | 1.4 | 5.0 | – | 0.3 |
| 9. Oppeln | 6.7 | 21.7 | 40.9 | 2.8 | 12.1 | 2.3 | 1.5 | 3.0 | – | 7.8 |
| 10. Magdeburg | 38.6 | 25.1 | 2.1 | 13.4 | 5.2 | 7.2 | 3.1 | 4.8 | – | 0.0 |
| 11. Merseburg | 18.7 | 29.6 | 1.4 | 12.1 | 22.9 | 6.9 | 4.4 | 3.5 | – | – |
| 12. Erfurt | 21.7 | 22.1 | 13.9 | 12.3 | 13.4 | 5.2 | 5.2 | 6.3 | – | – |
| 13. Schleswig-Holstein | 30.5 | 33.6 | – | 15.1 | 6.9 | 9.0 | 2.7 | 0.6 | – | 0.7 |
| 14. Weser-Ems | 30.5 | 16.4 | 28.4 | 14.5 | 3.0 | 6.2 | 4.7 | – | 4.4 | – |
| 15. Hanover East | 28.2 | 20.9 | 1.4 | 11.5 | 4.5 | 4.2 | 4.3 | – | 24.7 | 0.1 |
| 16. Hanover South | 34.9 | 15.9 | 6.6 | 13.4 | 4.7 | 4.7 | 3.0 | – | 16.4 | 0.1 |
| 17. Westphalia North | 20.3 | 15.3 | 41.7 | 8.8 | 6.7 | 3.0 | 1.1 | 1.0 | – | 0.4 |
| 18. Westphalia South | 24.6 | 12.5 | 27.3 | 12.1 | 12.2 | 6.0 | 1.1 | 1.7 | – | 0.7 |
| 19. Hesse-Nassau | 31.9 | 18.6 | 17.5 | 12.6 | 5.6 | 8.5 | 2.4 | 2.3 | – | – |
| 20. Köln-Aachen | 15.4 | 7.1 | 51.2 | 7.9 | 8.8 | 3.6 | 0.6 | 4.9 | – | 0.0 |
| 21. Koblenz-Trier | 10.6 | 9.9 | 60.8 | 7.7 | 4.2 | 3.3 | 0.5 | 3.0 | – | – |
| 22. Düsseldorf East | 15.4 | 15.3 | 24.5 | 11.6 | 20.9 | 4.5 | 1.6 | 4.3 | – | 0.2 |
| 23. Düsseldorf West | 13.9 | 11.3 | 43.1 | 9.5 | 12.5 | 3.4 | 0.9 | 3.9 | – | 0.5 |

Note: shaded boxes indicate the party that won the most votes in the constituency.

== See also ==
- Elections in the Free State of Prussia
- Weimar Republic
