= Arkadi Maslow =

Communist politician in Weimar Germany

- Maslow c. 1920s

Chairman of the Communist Party of Germany
- In office April 1924 – August 1925 Serving with Ruth Fischer
- Preceded by: Heinrich Brandler
- Succeeded by: Ernst Thälmann

Personal details
- Born: Isaak Yefimowich Chemerinsky; 9 March 1891 Yelisavetgrad, Russian Empire
- Died: 20 November 1941 (aged 50) Havana, Cuba
- Citizenship: Russian Empire; Germany
- Party: KPD (1919–1926)
- Other political affiliations: Spartacus League (1918); Left Communists (1926–1928); Leninbund (1928)
- Domestic partner: Ruth Fischer (1919–1941)

Military service
- Allegiance: German Empire
- Branch/service: Imperial German Army
- Battles/wars: World War I
- Central institution membership: 1924–1926: Full member, KPD Politburo; 1924–1926: Full member, KPD Central Committee (Note: Zentrale until 1925); 1921–1925: Member, KPD Central Commission

Arkadi Maslow, (Note: Ukrainian: Аркадій Маслов; Russian: Аркадий Маслов) born Isaak Yefimowich Chemerinsky (Note: Ukrainian: Ісаак Юхимович Чемеринський; Russian: Исаак Ефимович Чемеринский) (March 9, 1891 – November 20, 1941), was a communist politician in the Weimar Republic. Along with his partner Ruth Fischer, he was a leading figure in the Communist Party of Germany (KPD) through both the May 1924 and December 1924 federal elections.

== Background ==
Isaak Jefimowitsch Tschemerinski was born into a Jewish merchant family, in Yelisavetgrad (now Kropyvnytskyi) in Ukraine. In 1899, he relocated with his mother and sister to Berlin, where he attended school (Gymnasium) and thereupon completed studies in piano at a conservatory. In 1912 in Berlin, Tschemerinski began studies in science under, among others, Albert Einstein and Max Planck. At the outbreak of World War I in 1914, he was first interned as a Russian citizen but voluntarily enlisted in the German army as an interpreter, in which capacity he served in prisoner of war camps.

== Career ==
=== Communist Party of Germany ===
Tschemerinski’s wartime experiences radicalized his political sympathies towards the Spartakusbund. Upon resuming his studies, he befriended Paul Levi and Ruth Fischer, who convinced him to join the Communist Party of Germany (KPD). He changed his name to Arkadi Maslow, and in November 1920 was elected to the KPD Central Committee. From 1921 Maslow, together with Ruth Fischer, led the left wing of the Berlin KPD. In 1921, Maslow became the foreign affairs editor of the Rote Fahne. Taken into custody by the Berlin police in 1922, he identified himself as a Soviet agent and a confidant of Leon Trotsky and Karl Radek. Because his passport had expired, he was sentenced to eight months in prison. To avoid serving prison term, he went into hiding. At the same time, a rumor circulated in the KPD that Maslow was a spy for the police. During a visit to Moscow in 1923, he was interrogated about these charges by an investigative committee of the Comintern, who exonerated and released him. However he remained under detention in Moscow until early 1924.

In April 1924, Maslow and Fischer, criticized as “right-wing” by August Thalheimer and Heinrich Brandler, assumed leadership of the Party and were responsible for intensifying the “left-turn” of the KPD. Taken once again into custody in May 1925, Maslow, together with Paul Schlecht and Anton Grylewicz, was brought to court and sentenced to four years in prison. Because of his failing health, Maslow was released in July 1926. Since Maslow and Fischer no longer enjoyed the protection of Grigory Zinoviev, under a directive of Joseph Stalin to favor Ernst Thälmann, they were relieved of the Party leadership, and on August 20, 1926, were excluded from the KPD.

=== Leninbund ===
Together with Ruth Fischer and Hugo Urbahns, Maslow brought together former members of the left wing of the KPD, which led to formation of the Lenin League (Leninbund) in early 1928. The KPD thereupon accused Maslow of being an “Agent for the Bourgeoisie” and demanded that he not be allowed to leave Germany, under the supposition that his political work would then undermine the work of the KPD. In May 1928, Maslow and Fischer resigned from the Leninbund, because they disagreed with the Leninbund’s support of an independent candidate opposed to the KPD, and after the capitulation of Zinoviev and Kamenev who were opposed to Stalin, anticipated the hope (in vain) of being accepted again into the KPD. Until 1933, Maslow remained active as a translator and withdrew from extensive participation in political activity.

=== Exile ===
Following the rise to power of the Nazis in 1933, Maslow and Fischer first fled to Paris, where they resided until 1940. From 1934 to 1936, Maslow worked closely with Trotsky and served as a part of the movement towards a Fourth International. After the break with Trotsky, Maslow and Ruth Fischer founded a circle with the name Marxist–Leninist International Group, which lasted until 1939. During the Moscow Trials of 1936 to 1938, Maslow was again accused by the Stalinist press as an espionage agent.

== Death ==
After the fall of France in 1940, Maslow and Fischer fled to Cuba. Unlike Fischer, he was unable to obtain an entry visa to the United States. On 20 November 1941, Maslow was found dead on a street in Havana. According to an official investigation, he had suffered a heart attack. However, Ruth Fischer and Franz Pfemfert were of the opinion that Maslow was murdered by the NKVD. In 1952, Guenther Reinhardt concurred and described his "accidental death" in details that implicated the NKVD. Reinhardt also claimed that Fischer later discovered that her own brother, Gerhard Eisler, had given the kill order.

== Works ==
- Die zwei Revolutionen des Jahres 1917. Berlin 1924.
- Die Tochter des Generals, Written in 1935 Berlin 2011 ISBN 978-3-937233-76-5 Text by Maslow. Edited and with commentary by Berit Balzer
- Abtrünnig wider Willen. Aus Briefen und Manuskripten des Exils. Munich 1990 ISBN 3-486-55331-3 (Text by Maslow and Ruth Fischer, edited by Peter Luebbe, with an introduction by Hermann Weber)

== Literature ==
- Mario Keßler. A Political Biography of Arkadij Maslow, 1891-1941: Dissident Against His Will (Palgrave Macmillan, New York 2020), ISBN 978-3-030-43256-0.
