= Hugo Urbahns =

German politician

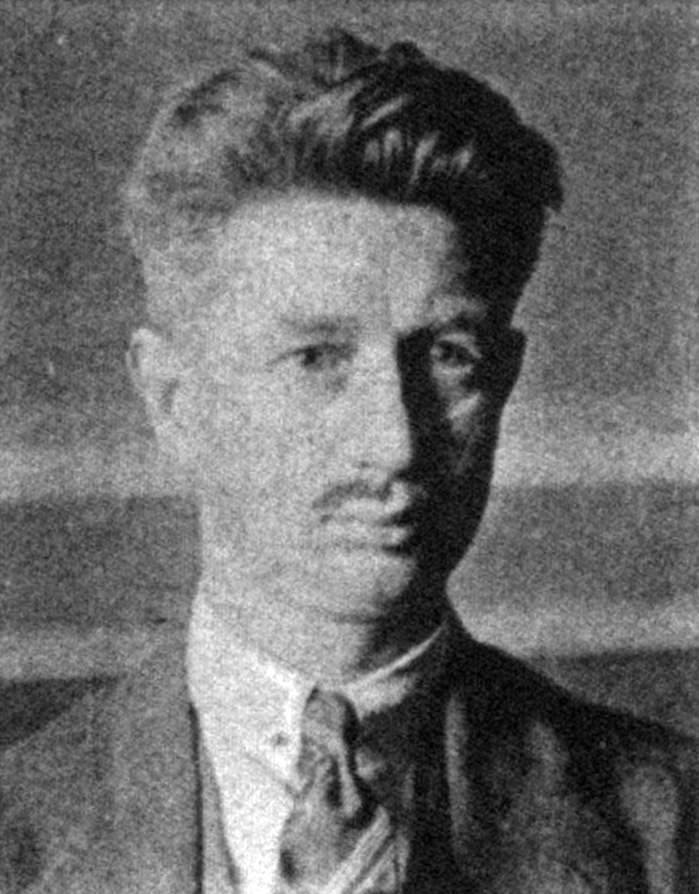
- Urbahns c. 1924

Leader of the Leninbund
- In office April 1928 – September 1939
- Preceded by: Position established
- Succeeded by: Position abolished

Member of the Reichstag for Schleswig-Holstein
- In office 27 May 1924 – 1 July 1928
- Preceded by: Multi-member district
- Succeeded by: Multi-member district

Personal details
- Born: 18 February 1890 Lieth, Province of Schleswig-Holstein, Kingdom of Prussia, German Empire
- Died: 16 November 1946 (aged 56) Stockholm, Sweden
- Party: SPD (1912–1919); KPD (1919–1926); Leninbund (1928–1939)
- Other political affiliations: Spartacus League (1914–1918)
- Central institution membership: 1925–1926: Full member, KPD Central Committee; 1921–1925: Member, KPD Central Commission

Hugo Urbahns (18 February 1890 – 16 November 1946) was a German communist revolutionary and politician.

He was involved in the Communist Party of Germany (KPD) in the 1920s. He was jailed for his role in the Hamburg Uprising of 1923, and spent time on hunger strike.

He was expelled from the KPD in the late 1920s, and became the leader of the Leninbund, a left split from the KPD.

For a time he had links with Leon Trotsky, but they drifted apart over a number of issues, including Urbahns' development of "third campist" positions that the Soviet Union was no longer a workers' state.
