= International Communists of Germany =

International Communists of Germany Internationale Kommunisten Deutschlands
- Leader: Otto Rühle; Johann Knief
- Founded: November 23, 1918
- Legalised: December 15, 1918
- Dissolved: December 30, 1918
- Split from: Social Democratic Party of Germany
- Merged into: Communist Party of Germany
- Succeeded by: Communist Workers' Party of Germany
- Headquarters: Bremen
- Newspaper: Der Kommunist
- Ideology: Left communism Council communism Internationalism
- Political position: Far-left

International Communists of Germany (German: Internationalen Kommunisten Deutschlands; IKD) was a communist political grouping founded in November 1918 during the German Revolution. The small party was, together with the better known Spartacist League, one of the constituent organizations that joined to form the Communist Party of Germany in 1918.

== Organizational history ==
The International Communists of Germany (IKD) was initially founded as the International Socialists of Germany (ISD), and were in the anti-war opposition within the Social Democratic Party of Germany (SPD). Within the Bremen and Hamburg district organizations, a left opposition took stand against the "Burgfriedenspolitik" – the Reichstag's support for World War I, which the SPD supported. This current was identified as the Bremen Radical Leftists (German: Bremer Linksradikale) around the newspaper Bremer Bürger-Zeitung edited by Johann Knief, although their followers would be found outside Bremen as well. They were influenced by Karl Radek and Anton Pannekoek. Subsequently, parts of the Bremen group advocated the thesis that one had to finally break away from the SPD and, under the influence of Knief, founded the first declared communist party in Germany on November 23, 1918, the International Communists of Germany.

Only in 1918 the current institutionalized as a party and took its new name - the German Revolution had taken away censorship and repression.

During the founding party congress of the Communist Party of Germany, the IKD groups joined forces with the Spartakusbund to form the KPD. Large parts of the former IKD members, however, were expelled from the KPD again at the Heidelberg party congress of the KPD, which took place from October 20 to 23, 1919, because they appeared in the party against the centralism of the Spartakusbund. They were then accused of syndicalism by Paul Levi. Leading former IKD members such as Otto Rühle and Heinrich Laufenberg then founded the Communist Workers' Party of Germany on April 3, 1920, a minority around Paul Frölich remained in the KPD.

The same name was later used by German Trotskyists who, fleeing Germany after the Nazis' rise to power in 1933, established an exile organization in Paris. Arthur Goldstein was involved in this incarnation of the International Communists of Germany.

== Notable members ==
- Marie Griesbach
- Johann Knief
- Otto Rühle
- Julian Borchardt
- Heinrich Laufenberg
