= Jan Appel =

German revolutionary

- Born: 22 August 1890; Mecklenburg, German Empire
- Died: 4 May 1985 (aged 94); Maastricht, Holland
- Other names: Max Hempel; Jan Arndt; Jan Voß
- Occupation: Shipbuilder
- Employer: AG Vulcan Stettin
- Organization: Revolutionary Stewards
- Political party: ICC
- Other political affiliations: SPD; Spartacus League; KPD; KAPD; GIK
- Movement: Left communism
- Military and revolutionary involvement
- Allegiance: Third International
- Military service: German Army; Dutch resistance (MLL-Front)
- Service years: 1911–1917
- Conflicts: World War I; November Revolution; World War II

Jan Appel (pseudonyms: Max Hempel, Jan Arndt, Jan Voß; 22 August 1890 – 4 May 1985) was a German revolutionary who participated in the German Revolution of 1918. He became a prominent Left Communist activist and theorist.

== Early life ==
Appel was born in 1890 in Mecklenburg, Germany. His father was an active socialist and from 1908 he was an active member of the Social Democratic Party of Germany. Although he trained as a shipbuilder, he joined the army in 1911 and served until 1913. Then he saw active service in the First World War. He was demobilised in 1917 and sent to work in the Vulcan Werft Hamburg shipyard. In January 1918 he participated in the strike wave which involved over 400,000 workers across Germany demanding immediate peace without annexation or indemnity, better food, and end to military discipline in the factories and the release of political prisoners.

== The German Revolution ==
Jan Appel was involved in the German Revolution of November 1918:

"When, in November 1918 the sailors revolted and the workers of the shipyards in Kiel downed tools, we learned at the Vulkan military shipyard from the workers what had happened. There followed a secret meeting at the shipyards; the factory was under military occupation, work ceased, but the workers remained in assembly in the enterprise. A delegation of 17 volunteers was sent to the union headquarters, to insist on the declaration of a general strike. We insisted on holding an assembly, but it turned out that the known leaders of the ADGB and the SPD and of the unions adopted a negative an attitude towards the strike. There were hours of harsh discussions. During this time, at the Blohm & Voss shipyard, where 17,000 workers were employed, a spontaneous revolt broke out. And so, all the workers poured out of the factories, at the Vulkan shipyard too (where Appel worked) and set off towards the union house. It was at this moment that the leaders disappeared. The revolution had begun".

By this stage Appel was involved with Hamburg Far-left politics participating in the Spartacus League and then the Communist Party of Germany (KPD) alongside Fritz Wolffheim and Heinrich Laufenberg. He was elected chairperson of the newly formed Revolutionary Shop Stewards (Revolutionäre Obleute). In January 1919, following the murder of Rosa Luxemburg and Karl Liebknecht the Revolutionary Shop Stewards gathered outside the Trade union Central Headquarters in Hamburg. Here he met Ernst Thälmann, of the Independent Social Democratic Party of Germany (USPD), whereupon they participated in a night march on the Bahrenfeld Barracks. Taking the soldiers by surprise they seized the armoury and soon had 4,000 workers under arms.

"At that moment, we reached the conclusion that the unions were unusable for the revolutionary struggle, and that led, at an assembly of the revolutionary delegates to propaganda for the constitution of revolutionary factory organisations, as the basis for the councils. Departing from Hamburg, this propaganda for the formation of enterprise organisations spread, leading to the General Workers' Union of Germany Allgemeine Arbeiter Unionen Deutschland (AAUD)”

== Involvement in KPD and KAPD ==
At this time Appel also became chairperson of the Hamburg District KPD, and was a delegate to the Second Congress of the KPD held in Heidelberg.

On 15 August, the revolutionary delegates met in Essen, with the approval of the Central Committee of the KPD(S) to found the AAU. In the paper of the KAZ different articles appeared at this time explaining the basis for the decision and why the unions no longer had a raison d’etre for the working class in decadence, and therefore the revolutionary period, of the capitalist system.

Appel, as the president of the revolutionary delegates, and an active organiser, was thus also elected president of the KPD(S) of Hamburg. During the subsequent months, the tensions and conflicts between the central committee of Paul Levi, and the northern section of the KPD(S) in particular, multiplied, above all around the question of the unions, the AAU and the mass party. At the Second Congress of the KPD in October 1919 in Heidelberg, where the questions of the utilisation of parliamentarism and the unions were discussed and voted, Appel, as the president and delegate of the Hamburg district, took up a clear position against the opportunist theses which were opposed to the most revolutionary developments. The opposition, although in a majority, was excluded from the party: at the Congress itself, 25 participants were excluded straight away. The Hamburg group in its quasi-totality declared itself in agreement with the opposition, being followed by other sections. After making different attempts at opposition within the KPD(S), in February 1920 all the sections in agreement with the opposition were finally excluded. But it wasn't until March that all efforts to redress the KPD(S) from within broke down. March 1920 was in fact the period of the Kapp Putsch, during which the central committee of the KPD(S) launched an appeal for a general strike, while propagating a line of ‘loyal opposition’ to the social democratic government and negotiating to avoid any armed revolutionary revolt. In the eyes of the opposition, this attitude was a clear and cutting sign of the abandonment of any revolutionary politics.

When in April 1920 the Berlin group left the KPD, the basis was given for the construction of the KAPD; 40,000 members, among them Jan Appel, had left the KPD.

In the insurrectional combats of the Ruhr in March 1920, Jan Appel was once more to be found in the foremost ranks, in the unions, in the assemblies, in the struggles. On the basis of his active participation in the struggles since 1918 and of his organisational talents, the participants at the Founding Congress of the KAPD appointed Appel and Franz Jung to represent them at the Communist International in Moscow. They came to negotiate adhesion to the Third International and to discuss the treacherous attitude of the Central Committee of the KPD during the insurrection in the Ruhr. In order to get to Moscow, they had to divert the course of a ship. On arrival they held discussions with Zinoviev, president of the Communist International, and with Lenin. On the basis of Lenin's text "Left-Wing" Communism: An Infantile Disorder, they discussed at great length, refuting among other things the false accusation of syndicalism (in other words the rejection of the role of the party) and of nationalism. Thus Appel, in his article 'Information on Moscow' and 'Where is Rühle heading?’ in the KAZ, defended the position that Laufenberg and Wolffheim ought to be excluded "since we can have more confidence in the Russian communists than in the German nationalists who have left the terrain of the class struggle". Appel declared also that he had "judged that Ruhle also no longer found himself on the terrain of the programme of the party; if this vision had proven itself to be wrong, the exclusion of Ruhle would not have been posed. But the delegates had the right and the duty in Moscow to defend the programme of the party".

He made many more trips to Moscow to get the KAPD admitted as a sympathising organisation to the IIIrd International, and thereby participated at the Third Congress in 1921.

In the meantime, Appel had travelled around Germany under the false name of Jan Arndt, and was active wherever the KAPD and the AAUD sent him. Thus, he became responsible for the weekly Der Klassenkampf of the AAU in the Ruhr, where he remained until November 1923.

At the Third Congress of the Communist International in 1921, Appel again, along with Meyer, Schwab and Reichenbach, were the delegates to conduct the final negotiations in the name of the KAPD, against the growing opportunism of the CI. They attempted in vain to form a left opposition with the delegations of Bulgaria, Hungary, Luxemburg, Mexico, Spain, Britain, Belgium and the USA. Firstly, ignoring the sarcasms of the Bolshevik delegation or the KPD, Jan Appel, under the pseudonym of Hempel, underlined at the end of the Third Congress some fundamental questions for the world revolution today. Let us recall his words:

"The Russian comrades lack an understanding of what is happening in Western Europe. The Russian comrades have experienced a long Czarist domination, they are hard and solid, whereas where we come from the proletariat is penetrated by parliamentarism and is completely infested by it. In Europe we have to proceed differently. The path to opportunism has to be barred ... Opportunism among us is the utilisation of bourgeois institutions in the economic domain ... The Russian comrades are not supermen either, and they need a counterweight, and this counterweight must be a IIIrd International ridding itself of any tactic of compromise, parliamentarism and the old unions".

== Active in the Netherlands ==
Appel was arrested in November 1923 on the charge of inciting mutiny on the ship with which the delegation had arrived in Moscow in 1920. In prison he prepared a study of the workers' movement and in particular of the period of transition towards communism, in the light of the lessons of events in Russia.

He was set free at the end of 1925, but Germany had become dangerous for him, and he obtained work at a shipyard in the Netherlands. He immediately took contact with Canne-Meyer, whom he had not known personally, in order to be able to integrate himself into the situation in the Netherlands. Departing from this contact, ex-members of the KPN and the KAPN regrouped slowly, and in 1927 formed the Group of International Communists (GIK in the German and Dutch acronym) which published a review, Press Material of the International Communists (PIK), as well as an edition in German. It closely followed the evolution of the KAPD in Germany and oriented itself more towards the Theses of the Berlin KAPD, in opposition to the group around Gorter. Over four years, the GIK studied and discussed the study which Appel had made in prison, and the book Foundations of Communist Production and Distribution was published in 1930 by the Berlin AAU, a book which has been discussed and criticised by revolutionaries throughout the world to this very day.

Appel made many other important contributions during the difficult years of the counter-revolution, up until World War II, against the positions of the degenerating Communist Parties, rapidly becoming bourgeois. The GIK worked in contact with other small revolutionary organisations in different countries (like the Ligue des Communistes Internationalistes in Belgium, the group around Bilan, Union Communiste in France, the group around Paul Mattick in the USA etc.), and was one of the most important currents of this period in keeping internationalism alive. From 1933 on Appel kept in the background, since the Dutch state, on good terms with Hitlerite Germany, would have expelled him. Until 1948, Appel remained in clandestinity under the name of Jan Vos.

During and after the Second World War however, Appel and other members of the GIK regrouped with the Spartacusbond coming out of the Marx-Lenin-Luxemburg Front, the only internationalist organisation in the Netherlands until 1942. The members of the GIK, who were expecting, like all the other revolutionary organisations at that time, important class movements after the war, considered it important to regroup, even if there still existed divergences between them, in order to prepare a more important, stronger revolutionary organisation, with the aim of playing a more preponderant role in the movements. But these movements did not develop, and numerous discussions cropped up in the group on the role and the tasks of the political organisation. Appel remained within the Communistenbond Spartacus. Almost all the GIK members left the group in 1947. Witness a letter by Antonie Pannekoek, himself having become a councilist, in September 1947:

"And now that the strong mass movement hasn’t turned up, nor the influx of young workers (we had counted on this for the period after the war, and it was certainly the fundamental motive of the GIK in regrouping with Communistenbond Spartacus in the last year of the war), it follows logically that the GIK returned to its old role, not preventing the Communistenbond Spartacus from returning to its old role as RSP. According to my information, the question of which form of propaganda to choose is presently being discussed in the GIK ... it’s a pity that Jan Appel has stayed with the people of Communistenbond Spartacus. Already in the past, I have noted how his spirit and his conceptions are determined by his experiences in the great German movement which was the culminating point of his life. It’s there that he formed his understanding of the organisational techniques of the councils. But he was too much a man of action to be content with simple propaganda. But the wish to be a man of action in a period in which the mass movement doesn’t yet exist, easily leads to the formulation of impure and mystified forms of action. Perhaps it’s a good thing after all that Communistenbond Spartacus has held on to one strong element".

By accident, Appel was re-discovered by the Dutch police in 1948. After encountering many difficulties, he was allowed to stay in the Netherlands, but was forbidden any political activity. Appel thus formally left Communistenbond Spartacus and organised political life.

After 1948, however, Appel remained in contact with his old comrades, both in the Netherlands and elsewhere, among others with Internationalisme, predecessor of the International Communist Current, at the end of the forties and during the fifties. That's why Jan Appel was once again present at the end of the sixties at the founding of Revolution Internationale, the future section in France of the ICC, and a product of the massive struggles of the proletariat in 1968. Since then with numerous visits from comrades and sympathisers of the ICC, Jan Appel contributed to the formation of a new generation of revolutionaries, participating at the formal constitution of the ICC in 1976, one last time, thereby passing on the torch and the lessons of one generation of revolutionaries to another. Jan Appel, died on 4 May 1985 at the age of 95.

== In popular culture ==
- The 1975 song La mela di Odessa (1920) by Italian progressive rock band Area is loosely inspired by an incident where Appel hijacked a ship to reach Soviet Russia and attend the 3rd World Congress of the Communist International.
