= Karl Plättner =

German writer and activist

Karl Plättner (3 January 1893 – 4 June 1945) was a German communist, militant social revolutionary and author.

== Biography ==
=== Youth and education ===
Karl Robert Plättner was born into poverty in Opperode, a village part of Ballenstedt, on the northern edge of the Harz mountains. He was the first of seven children to labourers David Friedrich Gustav Plättner and Friederike Helmholz. In 1905, the family moved to Thale, where Plättner's father had found work at the local ironworks. After completing elementary school and an apprenticeship in an iron foundry he worked as a metal caster. He was immediately politically active and at the age of 15 was already in trouble with the authorities, arrested for "offensive behaviour" and sentenced to a fine of 45 Mark and 15 days in jail. After a three-year apprenticeship Plättner, as was usual at the time, went on a journeyman's travels (Wanderschaft), eventually settling in Hamburg-Wandsbek towards the end of 1912, where he found work in a small factory serving the shipbuilding industry. He joined the SPD and soon became a leader of the Hamburg-Altona SPD Youth Federation and a member of the Hamburg party executive. At the outbreak of the First World War he distanced himself from the nationalist politics of the SPD leadership.

=== Political development ===
Plättner was conscripted into the 66th Infantry Regiment in Magdeburg and transported to the Western Front in October 1914. In autumn of the following year he suffered a bullet wound and was discharged as unfit for service at the end of that year. With three injured fingers he had to give up his career as a metal caster and worked until 1917 as a clerk with the Allgemeine Ortskrankenkasse (AOK) health insurance company. He continued to agitate against the war and was active in the underground proletarian youth movement. In February 1917 he took over as editor of the newspaper “Proletarier Jugend” and, together with other radicals such as Johann Knief of Bremen, organized meetings of socialist youth in northern Germany, engaging energetically to set up the Linksradikalen (left radicals) party . In September 1917 he was arrested for treasonable activities and held in remand. After being postponed many times his trial was set for 20 November 1918 but Plättner was released from jail after the outbreak of the November Revolution.

Immediately upon release Plättner and his comrades worked closely with Otto Rühle to establish the International Communists of Germany (IKD), which tried but failed to move the Dresden Workers’ and Soldiers’ Council in a revolutionary direction against the Majority SPD. At the end of December 1918 Plättner took part in the founding conference of the Communist Party of Germany (KPD Spartakusbund) as a delegate of the IKD's Dresden branch.

In January 1919 Plättner became chairman of the KPD's north-western region. After the proclamation of the Bremen Council Republic on 10 January 1919 he had no position in the leadership, but was a member of the Workers’ and Soldiers’ Council. He demanded that for each Spartakist killed, a leader of the SPD should be killed in revenge. After the Bremen Council Republic was defeated on 4 February 1919 he had to flee to Berlin.

=== Militant revolutionary commander ===
In March 1919 Plättner took part in the armed uprising by the working class in Berlin and, in consequence, was detained in jail from September to November 1919. He then spoke as a KPD agitator in Saxony-Anhalt. In March and April 1920 he also took part in the armed uprising following the Kapp Putsch. Following the opportunist turn of the KPD at the party's second (Heidelberg) conference, Plättner became a founding member of the anti-parliamentary Communist Workers' Party of Germany (KAPD) in April 1920. From mid-1920 he led and organized a group carrying out robberies of banks, post offices and collieries following the Marxist slogan of "expropriation of the expropriators". During the March Action of 1921 in Central Germany Plättner, together with Max Hoelz was one of the leading militant leaders of insurrectionary workers. After the failure of the uprising, he tried to redirect the struggle towards clandestine actions and robberies. The KPD distanced itself from this mode of struggle, which it characterized as Bakuninism". According to the assessment of the Reichskommissar for Public Order, Plättner was the actual leader and organizer of the "Supreme Action Committee of the KAPD" which was "in practice, a criminal gang". He was arrested on 3 February 1922 and held under high security at Halle district court jail, where he was strictly isolated from fellow prisoners.

=== Imprisonment and "Eros in Prison" ===
After a long legal process Plättner was sentenced to ten years‘ imprisonment and transferred to Brandenburg jail on 12 December 1923. While in prison he made a declaration to the KPD renouncing his earlier practice of guerrilla warfare and individual expropriations as "criminality disguised as romanticism" and "politically pointless, morally dangerous". Following his release in 1928, Plättner returned to the KPD. The publication of his book Eros im Zuchthaus. Eine Beleuchtung der Geschlechtsnot der Gefangenen (Eros in Prison. An Analysis of the Sexual Distress of Convicts) caused a sensation. Plättner discussed, with great frankness for the times, topics such as masturbation, homosexuality and the situation of pregnant women in prison. The inspiration for this work was "Eros im Stacheldraht" (Eros behind Barbed Wire) by Hans Otto Henel (1926), a collection of stories illustrating the sexual frustrations of front-line soldiers during the First World War. Magnus Hirschfeld and Felix Abraham of the Institut für Sexualwissenschaft in Berlin wrote the foreword to Eros im Zuchthaus, advocating matrimonial visits to lessen sexual tension in prisons. Friedrich Lichtneker, author and dramatist at the Vienna Volkstheater, wrote a play of the same name, which was first performed at an unknown venue on 23 November 1929. It was later produced at the Lobe and Thaliatheater, Breslau by Max Oppenheimer. The book was also mentioned in the opening credits of the 1928 film "Geschlecht in Fesseln" (Sex in Chains) directed by William Dieterle. In March 1922 Plättner's partner, Gertrud Gaiewski, gave birth to their son shortly after her own release from prison. Plättner's book was translated and published in English as "Eros in Prison" in 2019 by Ed Walker.

=== Buchenwald and death ===
Plättner developed into an opponent of Stalinism but gradually withdrew from political activity. Despite this he was arrested early on during the Third Reich and was interned at the Buchenwald concentration camp. In January 1944 he was transferred to Majdanek concentration camp. Towards the end of the war, he was sent to labour camps in Austria. Weakened and sick, Karl Plättner died in Freising shortly after liberation, while trying to return home. His body was interred in the Nagelberg War Cemetery in the Franconian town of Treuchtlingen, Bavaria.

== Works ==
- Das Fundament und die Organisierung der sozialen Revolution, Magdeburg 1919 / Republished by Karin-Kramer-Verlag in 1973 as Die soziale Revolution.
- Gefangen. 30 politische Juli-Amnestierte berichten über ihre Erlebnisse in deutschen Zuchthäusern / Edited and introduced by Karl Plättner, Berlin: Mopr-Verlag, 1928.
- Der mitteldeutsche Bandenführer, Berlin: Asy-Verlag, 1930.
- Eros im Zuchthaus. Sehnsuchtsschreie gequälter Menschen nach Liebe. Eine Beleuchtung der Geschlechtsnot der Gefangenen, bearbeitet auf der Grundlage von Eigenerlebnissen, Beobachtungen und Mitteilungen in achtjähriger Haft. Foreword by Magnus Hirschfeld and Felix Abraham,
  1. Edition: Mopr-Verlag, Berlin 1929;
  2. Edition: Witte, Hannover 1930.

== Film ==
Karl Plättner was credited as a researcher for the film:

- Geschlecht in Fesseln. Die Sexualnot der Strafgefangenen (Sex in Chains) by Wilhelm Dieterle, 1928.

== Literature ==
- Volker Ullrich: Der ruhelose Rebell – Karl Plättner 1893–1945; München 2000; ISBN 3-406-46585-4.
- Plättner, Karl. In: Hermann Weber, Andreas Herbst: Deutsche Kommunisten. Biographisches Handbuch 1918 bis 1945. Karl Dietz Verlag, Berlin 2008, ISBN 978-3-320-02130-6.
- Karl Plättner: Eros in Prison – Translated and introduced by Ed Walker 2019 ISBN 978-1-799-18652-6.
