= List of left communists =

Left communism is a form of communism with its origins in the left wing of several parties of the Communist International. Its two main original branches were in council communism and Bordigism. This is a list of theorists and political figures who have identified themselves as left communist, communist left, Bordigist or council communist.

== Council communists (German-Dutch school) ==
- Herman Gorter
- Otto Rühle
- Jan Appel
- Paul Mattick
- Guy Debord
- Antonie Pannekoek
- Bernhard Reichenbach
- Henriette Roland Holst
- Karl Schröder
- Ernst Schwarz

== Italian-left communists ==
- Amadeo Bordiga
- Onorato Damen
- Jacques Camatte
- Suzanne Voute

== Other left communists ==
- Marc Chirik
- Gilles Dauvé
- Guy Debord
- Willie Gallacher
- Salih Hacioglu
- Alexandra Kollontai
- Alexander Shliapnikov
- Claude McKay
- Gavril Myasnikov
- Ethem Nejat
- Sylvia Pankhurst
- Maximilien Rubel
- Grandizo Munis

== See also ==
- Left communist organizations by country
- List of Left Communist organisations in the Weimar Republic
- List of left communist internationals
