= Communist Workers' Union of Germany =

Historical German communist political party

Communist Workers Union of Germany
- Kommunistische Arbeiter-Union Deutschlands
- Abbreviation: KAUD
- Formation: December 1931
- Founder: 'Frankfurt-Breslauer Tendency' of the Allgemeine Arbeiter-Union – Einheitsorganisation and sections of KAPD and AAUD
- Dissolved: 1933
- Type: Council communist organization
- Location: Germany

Communist Workers' Union of Germany (German: Kommunistische Arbeiter-Union Deutschlands, KAUD) was a council communist organization in Germany. KAUD was founded in December 1931 by the 'Frankfurt-Breslauer Tendency' of the Allgemeine Arbeiter-Union – Einheitsorganisation and sections of KAPD and AAUD. KAUD appealed to workers to form autonomous workers councils.

One of their first publications was a document drafted by Jan Appel and developed by the Group of International Communists of Holland, Foundations of Communist Production and Distribution by the Kommunistische Arbeiter-Union Deutschlands in 1930. An English translation by Mike Baker was published in 1990.

KAUD also published a periodical: Der Kampfruf.

Shortly after the 1933 National Socialist takeover, the KAUD disappeared. During the spring of 1933, the group published magazines with different names. In December 1933, the organization was ripped apart by internal strife. By 1934, some KAUD cadres had regrouped as Revolutionäre Obleute.
