= Communist Workers' Organisation (UK) =

- Founded: 1975; 51 years ago
- Preceded by: Workers' Voice; Revolutionary Perspectives
- Newspaper: Aurora
- Ideology: Communism; Left communism
- International affiliation: Internationalist Communist Tendency

Website
- leftcom.org

The Communist Workers' Organisation (CWO) is a British left communist group, founded in 1975, and an affiliate of the Internationalist Communist Tendency, formerly the International Bureau for the Revolutionary Party. It publishes a quarterly magazine called Revolutionary Perspectives and distributes the agitational broadsheet Aurora. Works of the CWO and ICT have been cited in various academic and political sources internationally, across several countries and languages. The organisation has its origins in north England and Scotland (Liverpool, Newcastle, Aberdeen, Edinburgh), though it has since grown to encompass other areas with members and sympathisers across the world.

== History ==
=== Founding ===
The group was founded in the mid-1970s with the union of Workers' Voice, based in Liverpool, and Revolutionary Perspectives, a group based in the North of England and Scotland – some of whose members had previously been active in Solidarity. Both groups were influenced by German left communism and in particular the KAPD. Both also published articles on the German Revolution. Additionally, Revolutionary Perspectives translated Otto Ruhle's "From the Bourgeois to the Proletarian Revolution" into English as well. By 1975 the two groups coalesced broadly around the positions of the KAPD's "Essen Tendency". Both groups had also taken part in international conferences sponsored by the French group Révolution Internationale with the British group World Revolution. These two groups formed the International Communist Current, but the Workers' Voice group denounced this as "counter-revolutionary" over its defence of the October Revolution and its position on the period of transition. Revolutionary Perspectives had tried to mediate between Workers' Voice and World Revolution but was now forced to choose. As World Revolution had already rejected its draft platform and it had disagreements on several other positions, most notably the tendency of the rate of profit to fall, Revolutionary Perspectives chose to unite with Workers' Voice to form the Communist Workers' Organisation.

=== Early growth ===
For a year the organisation grew, publishing ten issues (the journals Workers' Voice and Revolutionary Perspectives) as well as distributing thousands of leaflets at factory gates and establishing groups in several factories. However, by the end of 1976 it was clear that the wave of working class struggle which had led to the rebirth of left communism in Britain was over. The Liverpool section now began to retreat into local activity and, without issuing a document or giving any political explanation, abandoned joint political work and dissolved. This loss was followed in 1977 by the demand of the Aberdeen section that the CWO should now join the International Communist Current, which they now claimed was the communist movement. Although the majority were prepared to discuss this the Aberdeen section left within a month (it would split from the ICC within a few years to form the Communist Bulletin Group).

=== Merger with PCInt ===
In 1977 the CWO majority adhered to the international conferences initiated by the Internationalist Communist Party from Italy, also known as the PCInt. In the course of these conferences, the CWO became convinced by the PCInt that the positions the latter had defended since 1943 were the best product of the left communist tradition. The two organisations formed the International Bureau for the Revolutionary Party in 1983. Due to their opposition to Stalinism/Marxism–Leninism, Maoism, and Trotskyism – as well as their theoretical basis originating in the Italian left – the CWO has erroneously been referred to as a "Bordigist" or "council–communist" organisation by some authors. A key distinction between the politics of the CWO/ICT and that of Bordigists is that the former do not view the party as the class itself, but an important tool used to fight for a communist perspective in the mass organs of proletarian power that are the workers' councils. For some time in the 1990s it was Sheffield that became a temporary HQ for the organisation.

=== ICT and later growth ===
The International Bureau for the Revolutionary Party was eventually joined by left communist groups in France, Canada, the United States and Germany. In recognition of this expansion it moved towards a closer coordination of its activities in 2009 with the formation of the Internationalist Communist Tendency. The CWO remains an integral part of the ICT. An initiative that the organisation was at the centre of in 2003–2004, known as No War But the Class War (NWBCW), was revived in 2018 by the CWO with the Anarchist Communist Group; the goal behind this move was to highlight the need to oppose all imperialist wars, including efforts of national liberation and other forms of lesser evilism espoused by social democratic and other left-wing groups – and instead focusing on workers' unity and class struggle. The views of NWBCW can be succinctly summed up by a 2017 statement from the CWO: "The only war which is worth fighting is the class war ... if the workers of all countries united and refused to fight, there would be no war!". In its long-time history, the CWO circulated hundreds of thousands of leaflets and publications that it had produced over the years.

== See also ==
- An earlier British organisation with the same name in the late 1960s was a Maoist group that merged with the Irish Communist Organisation in 1971.
- British left
