= International Socialists of Germany =

International Socialists of Germany (German: Internazionale Sozialisten Deutschlands; ISD) was the name of a political party, formed in September 1915, which split from the Social Democratic Party of Germany, following the latter's decision to support the German war effort in World War I. The ISD consisted of members who were on the left wing of the SPD. The party changed its name to the International Communists of Germany (IKD) in 1918 and most of members of the IKD joined the Communist Party of Germany in 1918, but later went on to form the council communist Communist Workers' Party of Germany.
