= Paul Kirchhoff =

German-Mexican anthropologist (1900–1972)

Paul Kirchhoff (17 August 1900, Halle, Province of Westphalia – 9 December 1972) was a German-Mexican anthropologist, most noted for his seminal work in defining and elaborating the culture area of Mesoamerica, a term he coined.

== Early life and academic career ==
Paul Kirchhoff was born in the German locality of Hörste, in the region of Westphalia. He commenced his undergraduate studies in Protestant theology and comparative religion at the University of Berlin, moving later to Albert Ludwigs University of Freiburg. In the mid-1920s he undertook further studies at the University of Leipzig in ethnology and psychology, where he first developed his abiding interest in the indigenous cultures of the Americas. completing his studies in 1927.

In 1928, he left for the United States. There, as a student of Edward Sapir, he studied the Navajo language until 1930. By 1931 he had returned to Germany to defend his thesis.

He was the co-founder of Mexico's National School of Anthropology and History in 1938, and held a research position at the National Autonomous University of Mexico.

Kirchhoff was instrumental in defining the concept of Mesoamerica, a cultural region sharing a number of common characteristics throughout most of pre-Columbian history, geographically defined as central and southern Mexico and northern Central America.

== Political activity ==
Kirchhoff's mother was a friend of Sonia Liebknecht, wife of Karl Liebknecht. From an early age Kirchhoff was involved in radical politics. In the early 1920s he distributed Die Aktion and may have been a member of the AAU and KAPD.

In the early 1930s he was a member of a left-wing faction within the KPD that later split to form the Internationalen Kommunisten Deutschlands (IKD), part of the International Left Opposition. Along with the majority of the leaders of the IKD, Kirchhoff objected to Trotsky's French Turn tactic.

While in the United States, Kirchhoff (who often used the pseudonym Eiffel) joined the Political Bureau of the Revolutionary Workers League that had rejected the French Turn and split from official Trotskyism. By 1937 Kirchhoff had left the U.S. for Mexico. There he soon split with the Revolutionary Workers League on the question of the Spanish Civil War. Kirchhoff defended the positions of the Italian Communist Left, which held that the war was imperialist and that workers should not support either faction.

From 1938 to at least 1940, Kirchhoff was a militant of a group called the Grupo de Trabajadores Marxistas (GMT) in Mexico. Because the GMT called for revolutionary defeatism in Spain, the Mexican Trotskyists alleged that they were witting or unwitting agents of the Gestapo. Despite the hostile political climate, the GMT managed to publish three issues of their journal Comunismo. Comunismo again defended the positions of the communist left: the identification of the USSR as capitalist, revolutionary defeatism in all warring nations, etc.

== Later life ==
After 1941, Kirchhoff appeared to retire from active political life.

He died in Mexico City in 1972.
