= International Communist Current =

- ICC logo derived from original artwork by Boris Kustodiev, as first used in the Communist International's review (1919)
- Abbreviation: ICC
- Founded: January 1975
- Newspaper: International Review
- Ideology: Left communism
- Political position: Far-left

Website
- https://en.internationalism.org/

The International Communist Current (ICC) is a left communist international organisation. It was founded at a conference in January 1975 where it was established as a centralised organisation with sections in France, Britain, Spain, United States, Italy, and Venezuela. It would go on to establish sections in Belgium, Germany, Netherlands, Sweden, India, Turkey, Philippines, Brazil, Peru, Ecuador and Mexico. The ICC published the first issue of its theoretical journal International Review in April 1975 and since then has published it quarterly, mainly in English, French and Spanish.

== History ==
In 1976, the ICC held its first international congress; among the participants was Jan Appel, a veteran of the German Revolution and the 1920 Ruhr Uprising. In the years that followed, contact was also opened up with Onorato Damen of the Internationalist Communist Party in Italy, and with Cajo Brendel of Daad en Gedachte in the Netherlands.

In 1977, two years after both the formation of the ICC and Communist Workers Organisation, the Aberdeen and Edinburgh sections of the CWO left to join the ICC. In 1981, many of those same members would split from the ICC to form the Communist Bulletin Group.

With Marc Chirik's death in 1990, having given his last 15 years to the organisation, the ICC published a brief summary of his life.

== Political positions and intervention ==
The ICC outlines its political positions in their short Basic Positions published on the back of every ICC publication as well as in their manifestos and platform. It claims to have created a "synthesis" of the different elements of the left communist tradition, in particular those targeted by Vladimir Lenin in his famous "Left-Wing" Communism: An Infantile Disorder: against participation in parliament or the trades unions, and against "entryism" into the Social Democratic, Labour, Communist or Trotskyist parties. However, at the same time they reject varieties of councilism which reject the Russian Revolution, saying that they express "a movement away from the conceptions of revolutionary Marxism".

The "Basic Positions" published on the back of every ICC publication define the organisation's activity as follows:

- Political and theoretical clarification of the goals and methods of the proletarian struggle, of its historic and its immediate conditions.
- Organised intervention, united and centralised on an international scale, in order to contribute to the process which leads to the revolutionary action of the proletariat.
- The regroupment of revolutionaries with the aim of constituting a real world communist party, which is indispensable to the working class for the overthrow of capitalism and the creation of a communist society.

From the beginning, the ICC attached considerable importance to the republication and critique of texts from the workers' movement. Over the years, it has published a number of books and texts including:

- A history of the British Communist Left
- A history of the Russian Communist Left (recent issues of the International Review have included a previously unavailable complete edition of a document by Gavril Myasnikov)
- A history of the Italian Communist Left
- A history of the Dutch and German Communist Left
- A history of the left wing of the Turkish Communist Party

The ICC's conception of practical activity within the day-to-day struggles of the working class was set out in a "Reply to our critics". The organisation's French section was heavily involved in the steelworkers' struggle in 1979. The ICC has defined itself as anti-Freemasonry, stating that "As exploiting classes, these enemies of the proletariat necessarily employ secrecy and deception both against each other and against the working class."

== Member parties ==
Country	Party	Founded	Venezuela	Internationalism	1964

== Publications ==
The ICC publishes its theoretical quarterly International Review in English, French, and Spanish.

It publishes regular agitational articles (in its printed press and/or on its web site), in the following languages: English, French, Spanish, German, Italian, Dutch, Turkish, Tagalog, and Portuguese.

It also publishes less regularly or occasionally in Russian, Hindi, Bengali, Korean, Persian, Japanese and Swedish.

It has also published basic texts in Greek, Finnish, Chinese, Arabic and Hungarian.

=== India ===
Communist Internationalist is the press of the International Communist Current in India. It publishes pamphlets, leaflets and statements in English, Hindi and Bengali.

== Sources ==
- Hempel, Pierre (1993). Marc Laverne et la Gauche Communiste de France, Tome 1. France: Châtillon.
- Bourseiller, Christophe (2003). Histoire générale de l'Ultra-Gauche. Paris: Editions Denoël. ISBN 2207251632.
- Internationale situationniste 1958-69. Amsterdam: Van Gennep. 1970.
