= Fourth International (disambiguation) =

The Fourth International may refer to:

== Original ==
- The Communist Workers' International, or Fourth Communist International, of left communists (1922–1933)
- The Fourth International, the World Party of Socialist Revolution, founded by Trotskyists in 1938
- Fourth International (post-reunification), successor organisation to Fourth International, founded 1963

== Successor / splinter groups ==
- The International Committee of the Fourth International, a group which claimed the political heritage of the Fourth International, founded 1953
- The Fourth International Posadist, group which claimed the political heritage of the Fourth International founded in 1962 by J. Posadas in Argentina

== See also ==
- List of Trotskyist internationals
