= KAUD =

KAUD may refer to:

- Kommunistische Arbeiter-Union Deutschlands
- KAUD (FM), a radio station in Mexico, Missouri
