= Communist Workers' Party of Bulgaria =

Party in the Kingdom of Bulgaria, 1921–1925

- Founded: January 7, 1922
- Dissolved: April 1925
- Split from: Bulgarian Communist Party
- Headquarters: Varna
- Newspaper: Workers' Spark
- Membership: >1,000
- Ideology: Left communism Council communism
- Political position: Far-left
- International affiliation: Communist Workers' International

Communist Workers' Party of Bulgaria (KRPB) (Note: Bulgarian: Комунистическа работническа партия на България, romanized: Komunisticheska rabotnicheska partiya na Bŭlgariya) was a council communist party in the Kingdom of Bulgaria. It was founded in January 1922, and was modelled after the Communist Workers' Party of Germany. The party was affiliated to the Communist Workers' International.

== History ==
=== Roots in the BKP ===
The origins of the KRPB lie in the left communist opposition of the Bulgarian Communist Party. From the founding conference of the BKP in May 1919, opposition to the dominant Comintern line formed around figures such as Ivan Ganchev, Stefan Ivanov, and Georgi Barzev (Note: Birth name Georgi Petrov, adopted Barzev as a pseudonym), arguing for an anti-parliamentarian strategy which rejected an alliance with the peasantry, including the then-governing Bulgarian Agrarian National Union under Prime Minister Aleksander Stamboliyski.

By April 1920, the leaders and a part of the opposition were expelled from the party. The group continued organising both within and outside of the BKP, and by September left communist groups had been founded in most of Bulgaria's industrial centers. A 4-man provisional Central Executive Committee, led by Ganchev, was elected, and a newspaper, Iskra ('The Spark'), was started, leading to oppositional members being branded 'Iskrists' by the party leadership. By spring of 1921, the opposition numbered over 2000.

Initially, the opposition sought reintegration with the BKP, and sent delegates to Moscow hoping to obtain a mandate to participiate in the 3rd Congress of the Comintern. This was rejected by then-Secretary of the Comintern, Karl Radek.

=== Foundation ===
Having failed to reconcile with the BKP, a founding congress was held in Sliven from 7 to 10 January 1922. The party's executive committee was to be based in Varna, with its composition made of at least two-thirds workers, renewed every 3 months to prevent 'bureaucratisation' and 'intellectuals'. The party numbered over 1000 members, the majority of whom were workers. The party newspaper was renamed to Rabotchnikeska Iskra ('Workers' Spark').

The party was modelled on the Communist Workers' Party of Germany, and advocated for the formation of a 'General Workers' Union' similar to the AAUD

=== Activity and dissolution ===
Following the 1922 split in the KAPD, the KRPB split along similar lines, with the party in Varna, led by Ivan Kolinkoev, following the Berlin faction, whilst those in Sofia sided with the Essen faction, although the party remained more united than its German counterpart. Both groups joined the KAI

During the September Uprising, the KRPB became subject to state repression. Leading members such as Ganchev were executed, though the party survived the immediate aftermath. Following a further state crackdown on communist activity in the wake of the St. Nedelya Church bombing by the BKP, the party dissolved in April 1925. Some members, such as Kolinkoev, maintained contact with the KAI.

== Relations with parties abroad ==
Following the party's decline in relations with the Comintern, the KRPB pursued contact with KAPD delegates in Moscow, and sent delegates to Berlin to participate in the next KAPD congress.

The KRPB was not present at the founding conference of the KAI in 1922, having initially written in January voicing their intention to not send a delegate to the future KAI congress, but joined the international officially sometime afterwards. The party was comparatively stable internally compared to other member parties, and was numerically the largest by their time of joining. A minority within the Varna section of the party maintained contact with the Berlin faction of the KAPD, and a delegate of theirs wrote for the Berlin party organ from 1924.

== See also ==
- Council communism
- Left communism
- Communist Workers' International

== Bibliography ==
- Bourrinet, Philippe (2016). The Dutch and German Communist Left (1900–68) (PDF). Brill. ISBN 9789004325937. OCLC 7347928396.
