= Group of International Communists =

Council communist organization in the Netherlands (1927–1940)

The Group of International Communists (Dutch: Groep van Internationale Communisten, GIC) was a council communist organization in the Netherlands from 1927 to 1940.

The Group of International Communists was formed by Piet Coerman, Henk Canne Meijer, and Theo Maassen in September 1927. Initially, it consisted of a single collective in Amsterdam, but later expanded to include groups in The Hague, Leiden, Groningen, and Enschede. Initially, consisting of just three members, it only had ten by 1930. The GIC grew in the 1930s, but never had more than fifty members. Most of its adherents were former members of the Communist Workers' Party of the Netherlands (KAPN). The KAPN was similar in its political positions and activities to the more influential Communist Workers' Party of Germany (KAPD). Both of those parties emerged from the revolutionary movements after the end of World War I. The formation of the GIC signified a shift from activism to political theory, with the goal of being prepared for a future revolutionary wave. The GIC had a certain amount of influence as its writings were widely read in the political milieu in the Netherlands to the left of the Communist Party (CPN), including by members of the Revolutionary Socialist Workers' Party (RSAP) and by anarchists. The leader of the RSAP, Henk Sneevliet, labeled the GIC the "monks of Marxism" because of their stubborn adherence to council communist principles.

The GIC's most important text was The Fundamental Principles of Communist Production and Distribution. Its first draft had been written by the German council communist Jan Appel between 1923 and 1925. Appel later joined the GIC and put his draft up for discussion in the GIC. After it was discussed in the group, Canne Meijer edited it and it was published in Germany by the General Workers' Union (AAU) as a collective work of the GIC. The Fundamental Principles sought to describe the economic conditions after a communist revolution. Their goal was to both criticize the economic system of the Soviet Union and to prepare revolutionaries for their tasks after a future uprising.

== Bibliography ==
- Benicke, Jens (2021). "Die Klosterbrüder des Marxismus: Über die "Gruppe Internationale Kommunisten" Holland" [The Monks of Marxism: On the "Group of International Communists" Holland]. Arbeit—Bewegung—Geschichte: Zeitschrift für historische Studien (in German). 20 (2): 37–55.
- Bourrinet, Philippe (2017). The Dutch and German communist left (1900–68): 'Neither Lenin nor Trotsky nor Stalin!", "All workers must think for themselves!". Leiden/Boston: Brill.
