= Felix Lewinsohn =

German communist activist

Fritz Felix Lewinsohn (19 March 1897, Dresden – 1???) was a communist activist and a leader of the Communist Workers Youth (Kommunistische Arbeiter Jugend), the youth wing of the Communist Workers' Party of Germany (KAPD).

Lewinsohn was the youngest son of Salomon Sigmund Lewinsohn and Auguste Paulin (née Gantze). His eldest brother, Willy Lewinsohn was also a communist activist.

On November 20, 1919 he attended the conference called by the International Union of Socialist Youth Organisations (IVSJO) at which the Young Communist International was founded.
