= Kommunistische Montags-Zeitung =

Kommunistische Montags-Zeitung ('Communist Monday Newspaper') was a weekly newspaper published by the Greater Berlin District of the Communist Workers' Party of Germany 1920–1921. It was published instead of Kommunistische Arbeiter-Zeitung (KAZ) on Mondays. Kunze, who also edited KAZ, edited the newspaper.
