= Adam Scharrer =

German writer (1889–1948)

Adam Scharrer (13 July 1889, Kleinschwarzenlohe – 2 March 1948, Schwerin) was a German writer.

He was born to Johann Scharrer and Margareta Haas.

He joined the Communist Workers' Party of Germany in 1920.

He remained active in the party until 1933. However, with the Nazi seizure of power he went was a wanted man and went underground in Berlin before fleeing to Czechoslovakia. Here, in 1934, he received an invitation from the Union of Writers of the USSR to come to the Soviet Union. Here he joined a writers' colony in Moscow. Although he spent a short time in Ukraine but returned to Moscow. During this period he got to know Oskar Maria Graf.

== Works ==
- Vaterlandslose Gesellen (1930) Stateless Journeymen, often seen as a response to Erich Maria Remarque's All Quiet on the Western Front.

== Sources ==
- Féral, T. (2002): Adam Scharrer: Ecrivain antifasciste et militant paysan, Paris: Harmattan.
