= March Action =

Failed uprising in Germany in 1921

- Part of the Revolutions of 1917–1923 and Political violence in Germany (1918–1933)
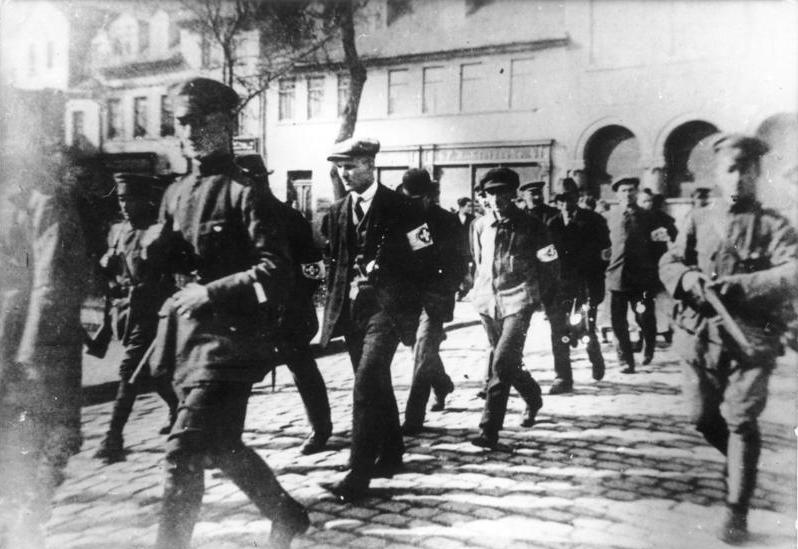
- Arrested communists escorted by police in Eisleben.
Date	17 March – 1 April 1921; (2 weeks and 1 day)
Location	Province of Saxony, Germany
Result	Government victory

Belligerents
Germany	Communist Party; Communist Workers Party

Strength
	200,000 strikers

Casualties and losses
35 police dead	6,000 arrested 4,000 sentenced
- 180 dead

The March Action (German: Märzaktion or Märzkämpfe in Mitteldeutschland, i.e. "The March battles in Central Germany") was a failed communist uprising in 1921, led by the Communist Party of Germany (KPD), the Communist Workers' Party of Germany (KAPD), and other far-left organisations. It took place in the industrial regions of Halle, Leuna, Merseburg, and Mansfeld, in the Province of Saxony. The revolt ended in defeat for the communists, and a weakening of contemporary communist influence in Weimar Germany.

== Background ==
The precarious economic situation in Germany in the early 1920s exacerbated widespread social discontent, especially among industrial workers. This led to left-wing parties becoming very popular in industrial areas. In the elections for the Prussian state parliament on 20 February, 1921 the KPD became the strongest party in the Halle-Merseburg constituency (in Prussian Saxony), winning almost 30 percent of the vote there. In the Central German industrial area, where lignite mining and the chemical industry dominated, there had been continued strikes, clashes between workers and the police, and thefts in factories and farms since the Lüttwitz-Kapp putsch of March 1920. All attempts to prevent such property offences by the Werkspolizei, including body searches and stricter surveillance, failed.

The situation in the province of Saxony also worried the Prussian state government because there were still numerous weapons in the hands of the workers that could not be confiscated after the suppression of the March uprisings of 1920. In addition, a failed bomb-attack on the Berlin Victory Column on 13 March, 1921 had been traced to Saxony. This prompted the Prussian Minister of the Interior, Carl Severing, and the President of the Prussian Province of Saxony, Otto Hörsing (1874-1937), to intervene in the Central German industrial area. On 19 March, 1921, police were sent to Mansfeld and Eisleben to restore "order and security".

== Events ==
The leadership of the KPD, which had long been seeking pretexts for overthrowing the hated Weimar government, hoped for a spontaneous uprising of the workers in Central Germany in response to the intervention of state power there. Revolutionary actions were to be initiated primarily through propaganda in the party newspaper "Rote Fahne" (Red Flag). The workers initially behaved cautiously. Despite the call from the KPD district leadership for a general strike on March 21, work continued in most companies outside the district of Mansfeld. Only on the following day did the work stoppages in the mining area Mansfeld-Eisleben expand.

With the arrival of the KAPD member Max Hoelz, who had already emerged as a violent and radical leader in the 1919/1920 workers' unrest in the Vogtland region, the strike movement escalated into a violent insurrection. Hoelz spoke at various strike assemblies and called on the workers to violently resist the police. The first violent attacks on police officers in Eisleben occurred during 22 March. Hoelz began to equip striking workers and unemployed miners with weapons and organise them into raiding parties, which subjected the area around Mansfeld, Eisleben and Hettstedt to arson, looting, bank robbery and explosives attacks. Trains were derailed and railway lines blown up. The KPD district leadership in Halle increasingly lost control of the armed workers due to the instigation of violence by Hoelz.

The uprising movement also threatened to spread to the Free State of Saxony, where unsuccessful bombings against justice buildings in Dresden, Leipzig and Freiberg had occurred. Bloody clashes between workers and police also occurred in Hamburg, where the Senate had to impose a state of emergency on the city. Against this background, on March 24 Reich President Friedrich Ebert declared a non-military state of emergency for Hamburg and the province of Saxony, on the basis of Article 48 of the Imperial Constitution. On the same day, the KPD proclaimed a general strike throughout the empire, which, however, failed to materialise. Solidarity strikes only occurred in Lusatia, parts of the Ruhr area and Thuringia. In Hamburg, unemployed people occupying some shipyards had violent clashes with the police. In the Central German industrial area, after the presidential decree became known the fighting intensified, also spilling over to Halle, Merseburg, Wittenberg, Delitzsch and Bitterfeld. However, the government troops managed to gain the upper hand and at the end of March the uprisings were finally suppressed.

The Leuna works was a particularly strong bastion of influence of KAPD, where half of the 20,000 strong workforce belonged to their associated workplace organisation, the General Workers' Union of Germany (AAUD). During the revolt they fought with rifles and automatic weapons. They also built their own tank, which they deployed against the police. The authorities only retook the plant with the use of artillery.

The broader strike movement broke down on April 1, 1921, when the last group of strikers led by Max Hoelz near Beesenstedt was broken up. The KPD withdrew its call for a general strike on the same day. Over a hundred people lost their lives in the fighting, and more than 3,000 insurgents were arrested.

== Gallery ==
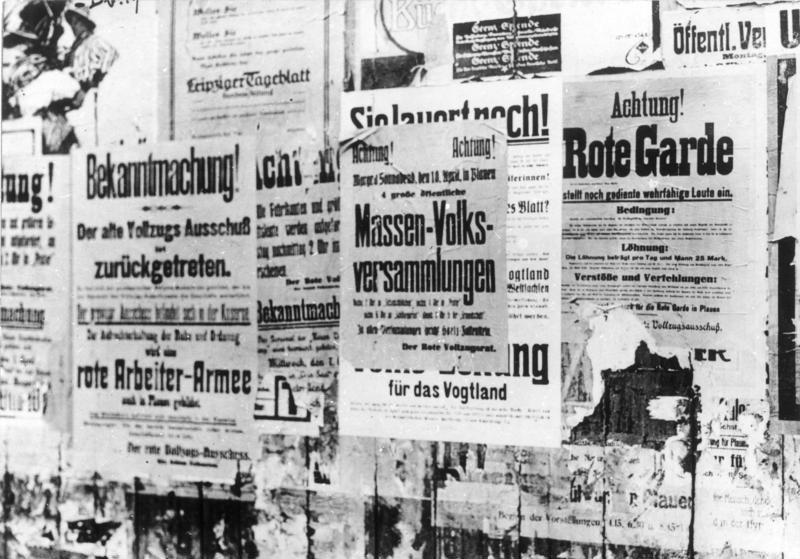
March Action posters on the Plauen town hall

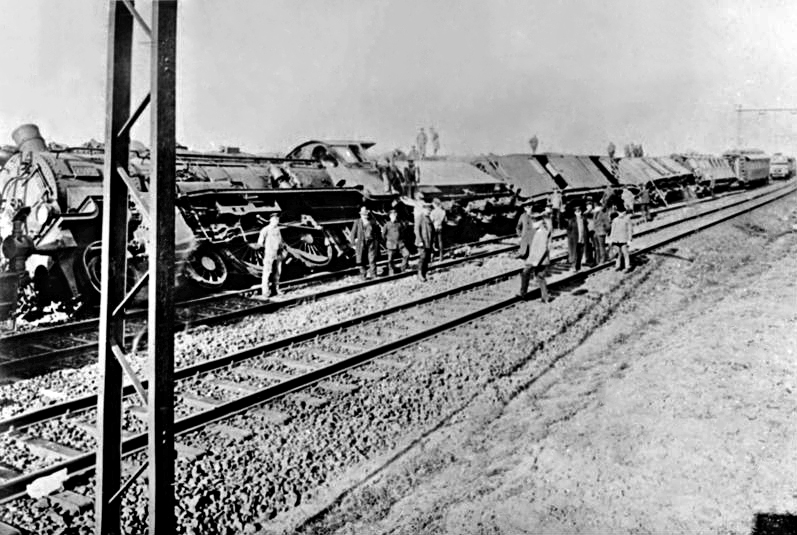
Scenes from a rail-yard during the March Action

== See also ==
- German Revolution of 1918–19
- Ruhr Uprising
- German October
