= Communist Workers' Party of the Netherlands =

Defunct political party in the Netherlands

Communist Workers' Party of the Netherlands Kommunistische Arbeiders-Partij Nederland
- Abbreviation: KAPN
- Leader: Herman Gorter
- Founded: 1921
- Dissolved: c. 1933
- Split from: Communist Party of the Netherlands
- Ideology: Council communism
- Political position: Far-left
- International affiliation: Communist Workers' International

The Communist Workers' Party of the Netherlands (Dutch: Kommunistische Arbeiders-Partij Nederland) was a council communist party in the Netherlands. It was founded in September 1921, and was modelled after the Communist Workers' Party of Germany. It was far smaller than its German counterpart. At most, in late 1921, it had 8 sections with a total membership of around 200. Herman Gorter played an important role in building the party. The party was affiliated to the Communist Workers' International.

The membership of the party decreased rapidly as the party was engulfed in internal conflicts.

== Prominent members ==
- Herman Gorter
- Henk Canne-Meijer
- Barend Luteraan

== See also ==
- Communist Workers' Party of Germany
- Communist Workers' Party of Bulgaria

== Bibliography ==
- Backes, Uwe (2008). Communist and Post-Communist Parties in Europe. Göttingen: Vandenhoeck & Ruprecht. ISBN 9783525369128.
- Bourrinet, Philippe (2016). The Dutch and German Communist Left (1900–68) (PDF). Brill. ISBN 9789004325937. OCLC 7347928396.
- Gerber, John Paul (1990). Anton Pannekoek and the socialism of workers' self-emancipation, 1873-1960. Springer.
