= Max Hoelz =

German politician (1889–1933)

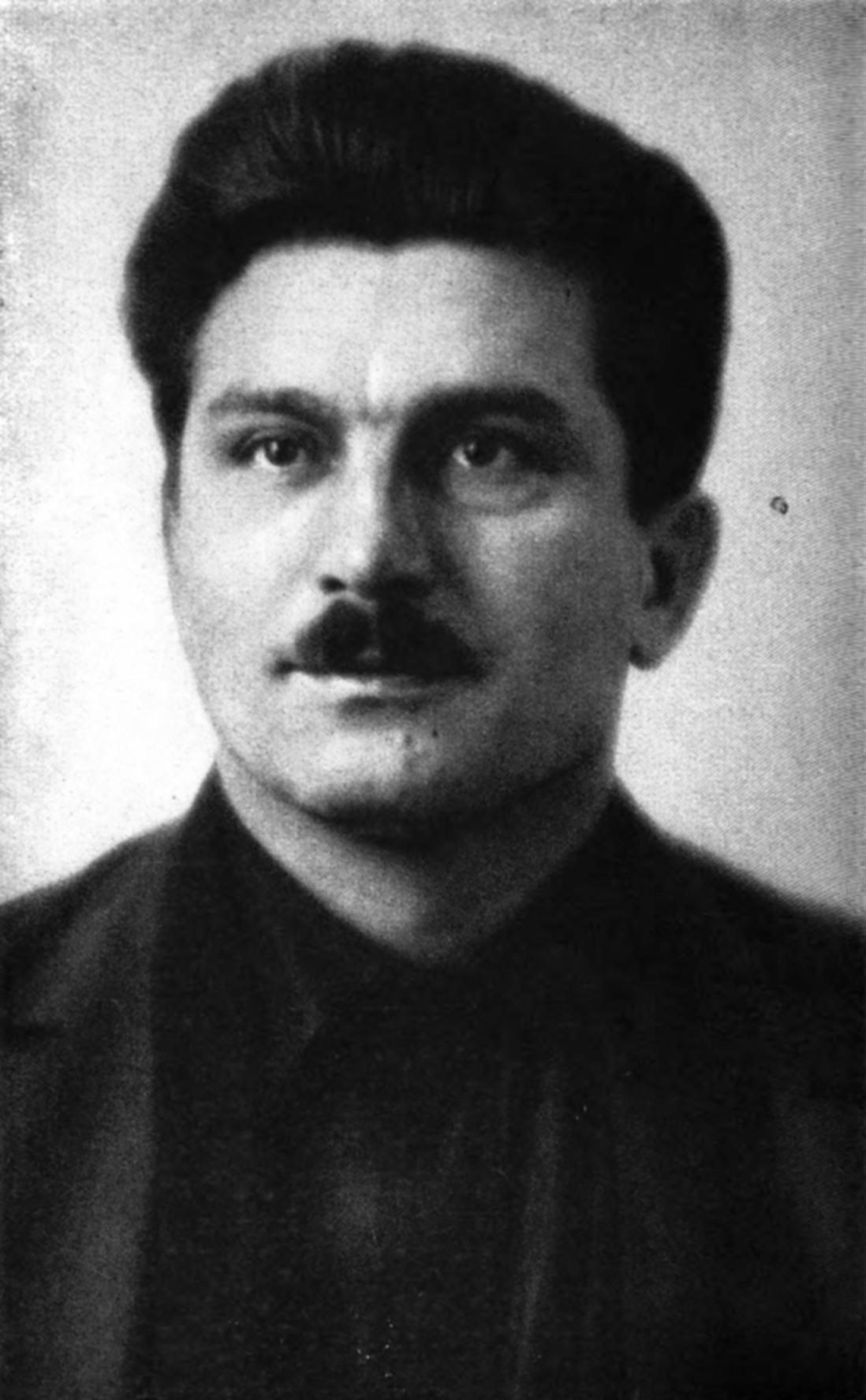
Hoelz in Berlin, January 1929

Max Hoelz (14 October 1889 – 15 September 1933) was a German Communist, most known for his role as a 'Communist Bandit' in the Vogtland region.

== Early life ==
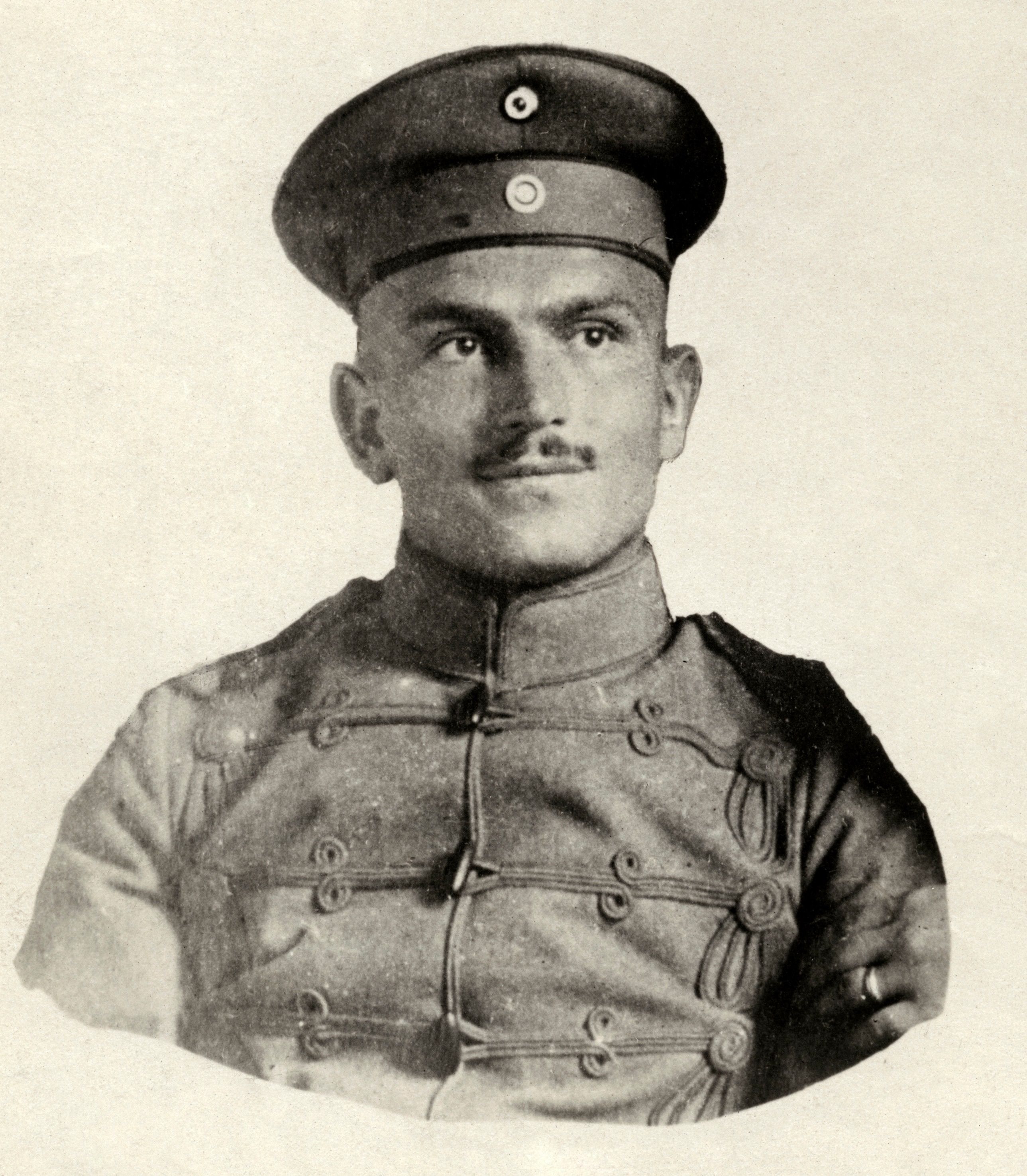
Hoelz in 1920

Hoelz was born the son of a day labourer and emigrated to Britain in 1905 to become a mechanic.

Hoelz served in the German Army during the World War I but was wounded and worked on the railways. Towards the end of the war he was working in a reinforced concrete construction company near Mulhouse in Alsace where he received news that his wife in Vogtland was ill, leading him to travel back to Falkenstein with soldiers returning from the front, amongst whom he helped form the Falkenstein Workers' and Soldiers' Council on 9 November 1918. However, he was shortly forced out of the council by his co-chair Sturl, a USPD member, but despite this he joined the USPD and got a job selling subscription to their new journal for the Vogtland, Vogtlandische Volkszeitung. Hoelz went on to found the local branch of the Communist Party of Germany (KPD) in Falkenstein in Spring 1919 and became a leader of the unemployed in the town.

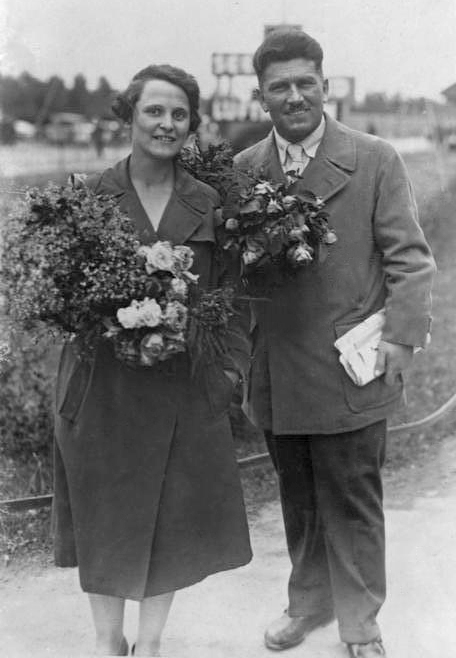
Hoelz with his wife Traute (née Loebinger), 1928

During the Kapp Putsch Hoelz helped form a Red Army in Vogtland. However the activities of his mobile detachment consisting of sometimes as many as 200 armed men caused dismay to the KPD leaders, and soon Heinrich Brandler of the Chemnitz KPD ensure he was expelled from the party. As the Communist Workers' Party of Germany (KAPD) was at that time bringing together former KPD activists who were disillusioned with the moderate politics of the KPD leadership, he soon joined them, finding himself more at home amongst their ranks. In the aftermath of the crushing of the Ruhr Red Army, the Vogtland was surrounded by 50,000 government troops and Hoelz led his army to the border with Czechoslovakia where they were surrounded by the Reichswehr. The Red Army split up into detachments to avoid the Reichswehr and Hoelz was eventually arrested in Czechoslovakia and then deported to Austria.

After returning to Vogtland in late 1920, Hoelz organised a band of around 50 men equipped with arms and bicycles to try and free those detained after the Kapp Putsch. The first bombing he organised was of the Falkenstein Rathaus on 6 March 1921 and others targeted courthouses throughout Germany.

Later in his 1929 autobiography From the White Cross to the Red Flag he regretted taking part in these attacks,

"It was a serious political error to approve, and sometimes even take part, in raids on bank buildings, post offices, etc. by expropriation squads. These funds flowed into the hands of the then leaders of the KAPD, thus fulfilling a political purpose by financing the printing of newspapers and leaflets. Only a small part was used over the years to help comrades who were living illegally in various parts of Germany. Unfortunately, the proletarian relief organization Rote Hilfe Deutschland (Red Aid Germany) did not exist at that time."

== March Action ==
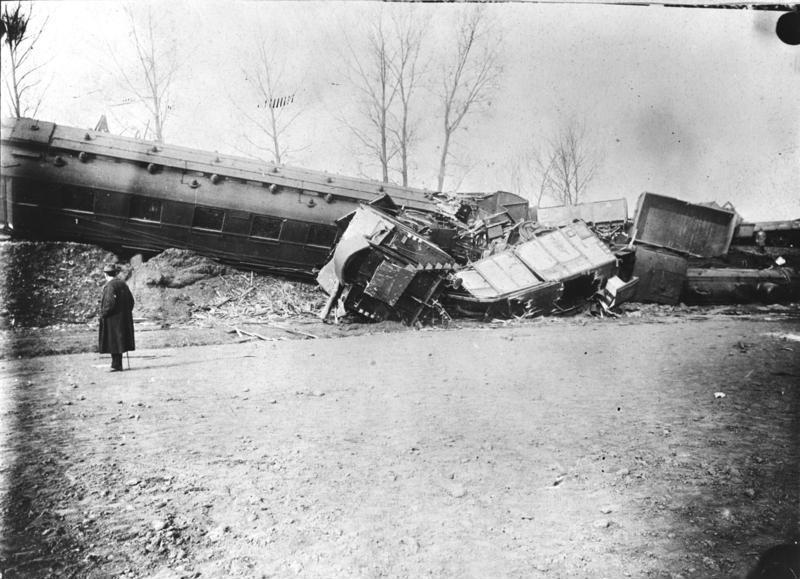
Wrecked train in Ammendorf, Saxony, March 1921

Hoelz was one of the leaders of armed groups during the March Action in the Mansfelder district and ended up on trial in Berlin in May 1921 where he was sentenced to life imprisonment.

== Later life ==
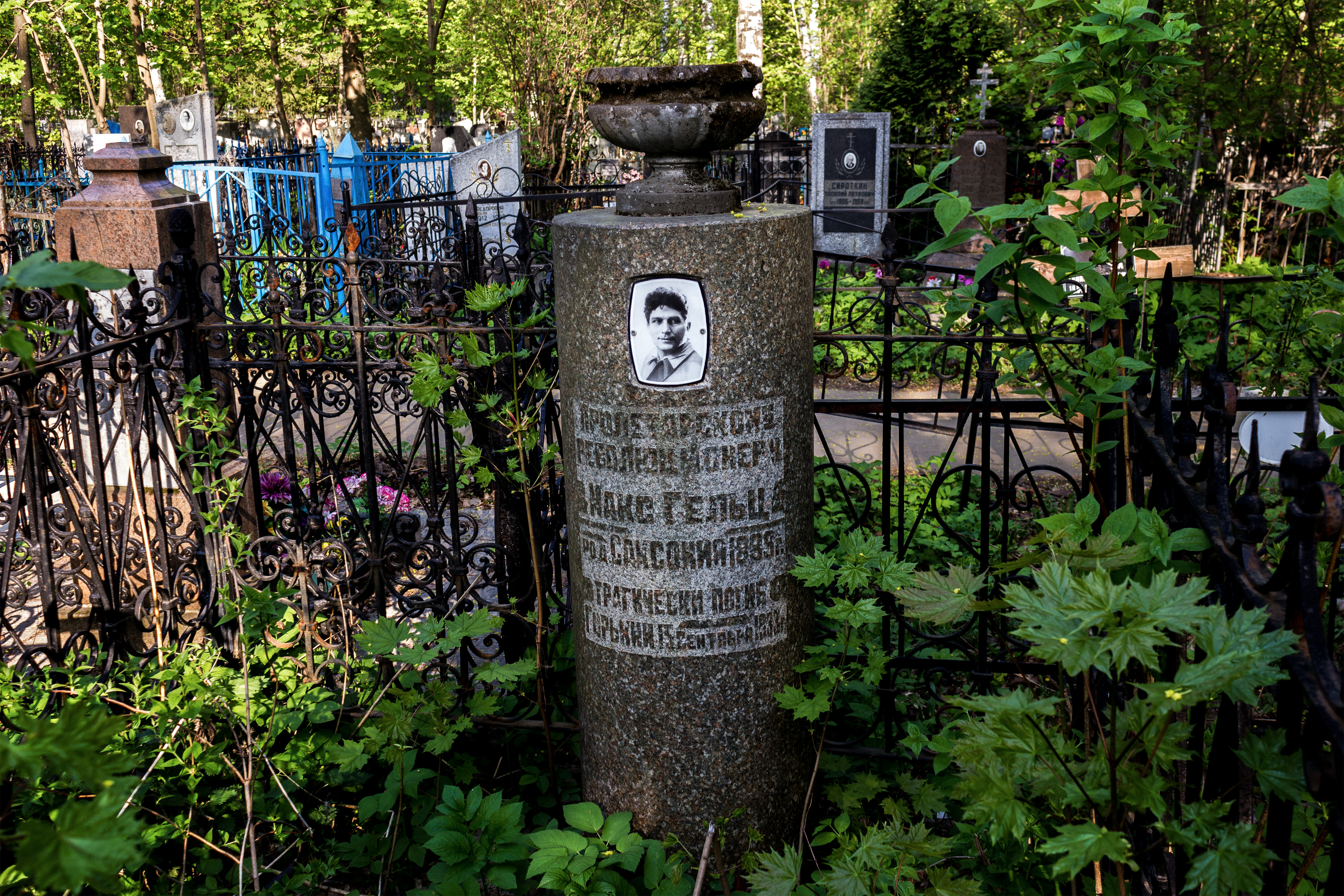
Nizhny Novgorod. Grave of Max Hoelz in Bugrovskoye Cemetery

He was released by an amnesty in 1928 and moved to the Soviet Union where he remained critical of Communist Parties of Germany and the Soviet Union as well as of the Comintern as a whole. His request to return to Germany was turned down. He drowned in the Oka River near Nizhny Novgorod on 15 September, 1933.

== Honors and awards ==
Order of the Red Banner

== Sources ==
- Hoelz M. From the "White Cross" to the Red Flag in Kuhn, G. (eds) "All Power to the Councils! A Documentary History of the German Revolution of 1918-1919", Oakland: PM Press
- Walker E. (ed) The German Robin Hood. Soldier, revolutionary and political prisoner: The extraordinary life of Max Hoelz 2019 ISBN 9781797714189
