= Bernhard Reichenbach =

Bernhard Reichenbach (12 December 1888, Berlin – 19 February 1975, London) was a member of the Executive Committee of the Communist International. He was a member of the Communist Workers' Party of Germany and acted as their delegate to the Third Congress of the Third International.

== Biography ==
He was born in Berlin in 1888, the son of Bruno Reichenbach. His younger brother, Hans Reichenbach would go on to become a leading philosopher of science. He became an actor in Bochum and Hamburg between 1912 and 1914. Bernhard's acting led to him making his first trip to Russia.

Bernhard was a conscientious objector but felt it was his duty to serve his country. He therefore volunteered for the medical corps and served in the German army during the First World War between 1915 and 1917. His time in the medical corps saw him serve at the Battle of Verdun. Bernhard was awarded the Iron Cross during his years of service, ultimately throwing his medal into the River Spree following the rise of the Nazis. Bernhard joined the German Foreign Office following discharge from the medical corps, where he served until 1919.

Bernhard joined the Communist Workers' Party of Germany and in 1921, two years after the birth of his son, Hanno, travelled to the Soviet Union as one of the party's representatives. At the 3rd World Congress of the Comintern, Bernhard held discussions with Vladimir Lenin. He also made contacts in the Moscow State Jewish Theatre, meeting Solomon Mikhoels and Alexis Granowsky. He worked with Granowsky on a production of Mayakovsky's Mystery-Bouffe. This was being produced by Meyerhold. Reichenbach was a trained economist and subsequently worked as a purchasing agent for a chemical company.

With the coming to power of Adolf Hitler and his Nazi party, Reichenbach (a German of Jewish descent with communist political beliefs) came under threat and fled to the United Kingdom via the Netherlands. At the outbreak of the Second World War, Reichenbach was interned as an enemy alien in an internment camp on the Isle of Man along with his son, Hanno. Both were able to convince the British authorities of their desire to contribute to the war-effort and both were released after a short internment. Bernhard would go on to work for the British Foreign Office on various anti-Nazi publications which were distributed around Germany and would later be awarded the Verdienstkreuz 1, Klasse, the German equivalent of an O.B.E., for this work.

Reichenbach married Ilse Rosendorn, with whom he had two children, Hanno and Tania. Hanno escaped Germany in 1935 shortly after his father and attended Great Ayton Friends' School, with several other German or Austrian refugees. Ilse and Tania would stay in Germany longer and ultimately escaped Germany in 1936.
