= Helmut Wagner (sociologist) =

Helmut Wagner (5 August 1904- South Dennis, Massachusetts, 1989) was a German educationalist and sociologist active during the twentieth century. He was politically active in Thuringia opposing the rise of the Nazis.

Helmut was born in Dresden on 5 August 1904.

== Published works ==
(1934): "Theses on Bolshevism"
(1939): "Bolshevism"
(1957): "The Cultural Sovietization of East Germany", Social Research, Winter 1957, Vol. 24, No. 4 (Winter 1957), pp. 395-426
(1983): Alfred Schutz: An Intellectual Biography, Chicago and London: The University of Chicago Press.
