= "Left-Wing" Communism: An Infantile Disorder =

1920 book by Lenin

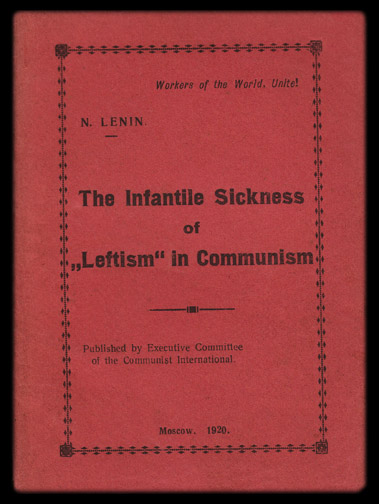
- First English edition, published by the Executive Committee of the Communist International for delegates to its 2nd World Congress
- Author: Vladimir Lenin
- Language: English
- Publisher: Executive Committee of the Communist International (London)
- Publication date: 1920
- Media type: Print (hardback and paperback)
- Text: "Left-Wing" Communism: An Infantile Disorder at Wikisource

"Left-Wing" Communism: An Infantile Disorder (Russian: Детская болезнь "левизны" в коммунизме, Detskaya Bolezn' "Levizny" v Kommunizme) is a work by Vladimir Lenin attacking assorted critics of the Bolsheviks who claimed positions to their left. Most of these critics were proponents of ideologies later described as left communism. The book was written in 1920 and published in Russian, German, English and French later in the year. A copy was then distributed to each delegate at the 2nd World Congress of the Comintern, several of whom were mentioned by Lenin in the work. The book is divided into ten chapters and an appendix.

Lenin's manuscript was subtitled "A Popular Exposition of Marxist Strategy and Tactics", but this was not applied to any edition brought out during his lifetime.

== Bolsheviks ==
Lenin argues that the Russian Revolution has considerable international significance and criticises the leaders of the Second International, including Karl Kautsky, for failing to recognize what he thought was the international relevance of soviet power as a revolutionary model. To illustrate their move away from revolutionary politics, he supplies a quote from a 1902 work of Kautsky which concludes that "Western Europe is becoming a bulwark of reaction and absolutism in Russia". Lenin asserts that in a war against the bourgeoisie "iron discipline" is an "essential condition". He continues by describing the circumstances that resulted in the Bolsheviks' successful assumption of state power in Russia.

The third chapter divides the history of Bolshevism into the "years of preparation of the revolution" (1903–1905), the "years of revolution" (1905–1907), the "years of reaction" (1907–1910), the "years of rise" (1910–1914), the "first imperialist world war" (1914–1917) and the "second revolution in Russia". He describes the changing circumstances for revolutionaries in Russia and the reaction of the Bolsheviks to them.

Lenin describes the enemies of the working class as opportunists, petty-bourgeois revolutionaries which he links to anarchism; and the "Left" Bolsheviks (expelled from the Bolshevik group in 1909), whom he links with those who criticised the Peace of Brest-Litovsk. He ends by criticizing the Mensheviks, Socialist Revolutionaries and members of the Socialist International who were prepared to compromise with the German leaders in defence of a capitalist system.

== "Left-wing" communism in Germany ==
The fifth, sixth and seventh chapters discuss a section of the Communist Party of Germany which split between the writing of the document and its publication to form the Communist Workers' Party of Germany (KAPD). As an example, he takes Karl Erler's article "The Dissolution of the Party". Lenin criticised the group's anti-trade union attitude, their anti-parliamentarism and Erler's proposal of a dictatorship of the masses as a counterpoint to the "dictatorship of the party" he claims the Russian Revolution has led to.

Lenin notes that the Russian Communist Party (Bolsheviks) rely on the Russian trade unions and that a reactionary labour aristocracy is inevitable, but must be fought within the union movement. In contrast to the KAPD, he holds that so long as much of the proletariat holds illusions in parliaments, communists must work inside such reactionary organisations. Lenin then compares the anti-parliamentarism of the Dutch left and that of Amadeo Bordiga.

Lenin then criticises the slogan "no compromises", noting that the Bolsheviks had made many compromises in their history. He believes that this is using theory as dogma, rather than as a "guide to action". Lenin also criticises National Bolshevism and some leftists for not recognising the Treaty of Versailles.

== "Left-wing" communism in Great Britain ==
Lenin critiques the Workers Socialist Federation's opposition to parliamentary action and in particular to affiliation to the Labour Party through texts written by Sylvia Pankhurst and Willie Gallacher. He proposes that all the main socialist groups in the country should form a Communist Party of Great Britain and that they should offer an electoral coalition with Labour. He concludes that the party would gain whether or not Labour accepted the offer. In a famous turn of phrase, he says that they should support Labour General Secretary Arthur Henderson "in the same way as the rope supports a hanged man".

== Lenin's conclusions ==
Lenin concludes that in each country, communism must struggle against Menshevism and "Left-Wing" communism. He claims that communism has already won over the vanguard of the workers, but that to win over the masses it must relate to the differences between the Hendersons, the Lloyd Georges (liberals) and the Churchills (conservatives). Despite certain defeats, he believes that the communist movement is "developing magnificently".

Lenin describes "Left-Wing" communism as the same mistake as that of the social democrats, but "the other way round", one that must be corrected; and that because "Left-Wing" communism is only a young trend, it is "at present a thousand times less dangerous and less significant than the mistakes of Right doctrinairism".

== Responses to the work ==
Several appendices were added to the document before publication in response to new developments in Germany around the formation of the KAPD and new studies by Lenin of the Italian left. A final appendix acknowledged a letter on behalf of the Communist Party of the Netherlands in which David Wijnkoop complained that the positions Lenin accorded to their organisation were only those of a minority in the group.

Lenin invited Pankhurst and Gallacher to the Second Conference of the Comintern. He convinced them to argue for their party, by then renamed the Communist Party (British Section of the Third International), to join the Communist Party of Great Britain. The CP(BSTI) did join and Gallacher remained a loyal member, although Pankhurst was expelled from the CPGB in 1921 and subsequently allied her remaining group with the KAPD, supporting the Communist Workers' International.

Herman Gorter replied to Lenin in an open letter, arguing that the smaller numbers of peasants in Western Europe constituted a key difference to the class struggle to that in Russia. In the introduction, he stated:

It has taught me a great deal, as all your writings have done. [...] Many a trace, and many a germ of this infantile disease, to which without a doubt, I also am a victim, has been chased away by your brochure, or will yet be eradicated by it. Your observations about the confusion that revolution has caused in many brains, is quite right too. I know that. The revolution came so suddenly, and in a way so utterly different from what we expected. Your words will be an incentive to me, once again, and to an even greater extent than before, to base my judgement in all matters of tactics, also in the revolution, exclusively on reality, on the actual class-relations, as they manifest themselves politically and economically.

After having read your brochure I thought all this is right.

But after having considered for a long time whether I would cease to uphold this "Left Wing", and to write articles for the KAPD and the Opposition party in England, I had to decline.

== Legacy ==
Besides other contexts, Lenin's "Left-Wing" Communism: an Infantile Disorder was the basic influence on contemporary Vietnamese official ideological language of "left-sided thinking" and "right-sided thinking." "Left-sided thinking" refers to "dogmatic idealism" which has "unrealistic conceptions of change and development". "Right-sided thinking" refers to "conservative resistance to change". According to the Vietnam Encyclopedia published by the Vietnamese Ministry of Culture and Information, these are the "two main strands of opportunism", with the former giving rise to "extremism" and "adventurism", and the latter strand being "reformist", and "given to undue compromise with capital".

== Literature ==
- Broué P. Lenin against ultra-leftism // The German Revolution, 1917–1923. — Haymarket Books, (2006) 991 pages (Historical materialism book series, Vol. 5) — ISBN 978-1-931859-32-5 — ISBN 1-931859-32-9.
