= Fritz Wolffheim =

German politician (1888–1942)

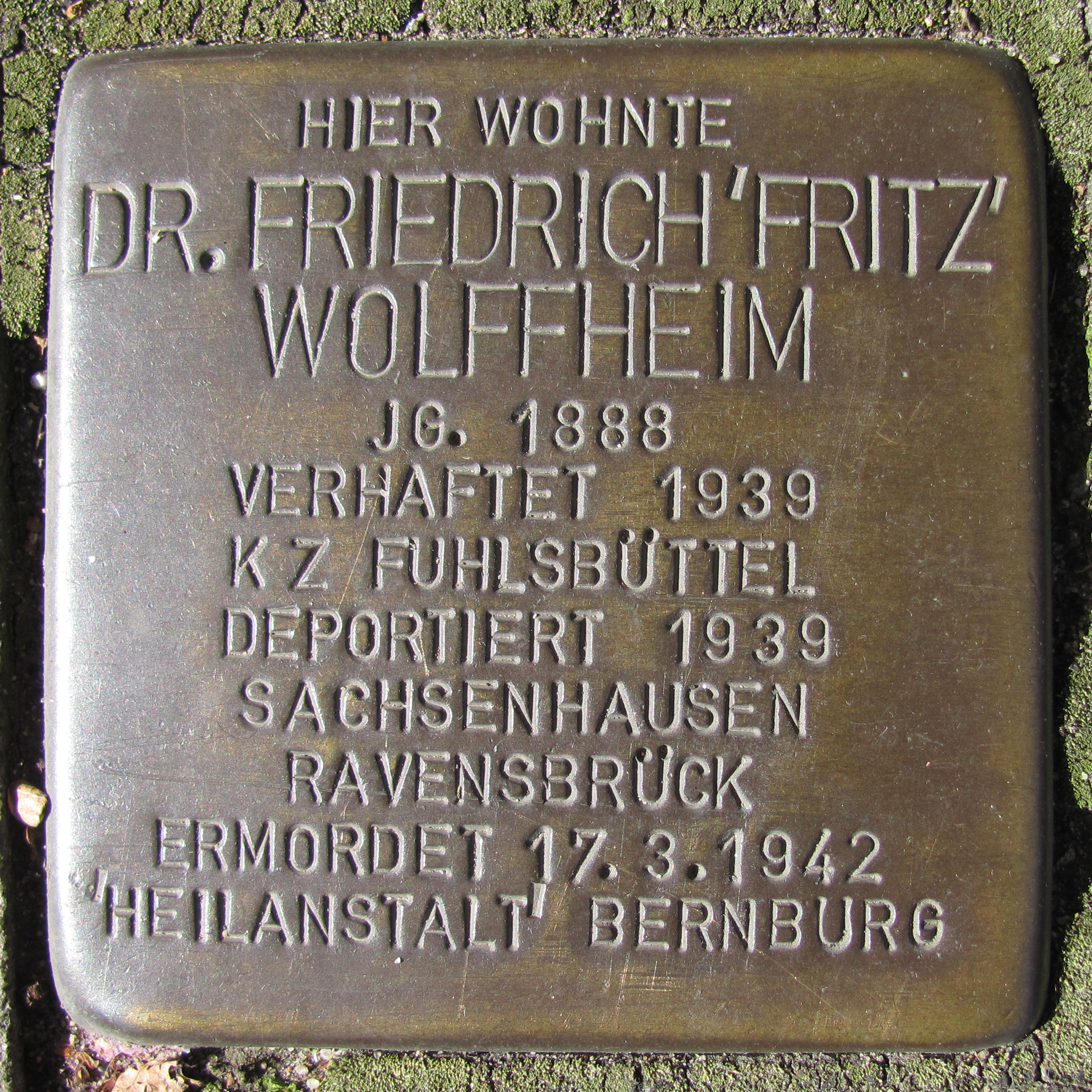
- Born: Friedrich Wilhelm Wolffheim; 30 October 1888; Berlin, Kingdom of Prussia
- Died: 17 March 1942 (aged 53); Ravensbrück concentration camp, Fürstenberg/Havel, Nazi Germany
- Citizenship: German
- Occupation: Accountant
- Known for: Politician
- Political party: Group of Social-Revolutionary Nationalists; Communist Workers' Party of Germany; Communist Party of Germany; Socialist Party of America; Social Democratic Party of Germany

Fritz Wolffheim (30 October 1888 – 17 March 1942) was a German Jewish communist politician and writer. He was a leading figure in the National Bolshevism tendency that was briefly influential in Germany after World War I.

== Early life ==
Wolffheim, who came from a leading Jewish family, trained as an accountant and first became active in politics in 1909 when he joined the Social Democratic Party of Germany. From 1910 to 1913 he lived in San Francisco where he was a member of the Socialist Party of America. In the United States he also became a member of the Industrial Workers of the World, editing a paper for them. He also served as secretary of the movement in San Francisco, working alongside Lala Hardayal in this capacity. Whilst involved with IWW Wolffheim became convinced of the need for a united revolutionary organisation instead of the distinct party and trade union model and would later use his theories in Germany where Anton Pannekoek adopted them enthusiastically. After arriving in Hamburg in 1913 Wolffheim won support for his ideas amongst the local party to the point where in early 1919 the Hamburg KPD declared that it was incompatible to be a member of both the Party and a traditional trade union.

== National Bolshevism ==
Within the Hamburg party a power base had been built up by Heinrich Laufenberg with Rudolf Lindau, Wilhelm Düwell and Paul Frölich amongst his closest lieutenants. Wolffheim became associated with this tendency and before long became Laufenberg's closest collaborator.

As leaders of the KPD in Hamburg the duo strongly attacked imperialism in Germany, publishing a joint pamphlet in 1915 in which both expansionism and the support that they felt was being given to it by the SPD were attacked. In October 1919 Wolffheim and Laufenberg brought their ideas, which were already known as "national Bolshevism" by that point, to Karl Radek arguing that they should unite behind a dictatorship of the proletariat which would harness German nationalism in order to renew war on the Allies in an alliance with the Soviet Union. The policy emphasised a co-operative struggle for national liberation at the expense of class war and thus broke from Marxist orthodoxy. Wolffheim even suggested that in order to bring about the desired revolution the far left combat units could be fused with elements of the far right Freikorps. The idea was rejected as nonsense by Vladimir Lenin whilst Radek also criticised the plan strongly. Before long Wolffheim was expelled from the KPD along with Laufenberg after the pair had tried to wrest control from Wilhelm Pieck.

Along with Laufenberg and Jan Appel, Wolffheim attended the Heidelberg conference that saw the birth of the Communist Workers' Party of Germany (KAPD) and was a founder member of this group. By 1920 however he had been expelled from the party, with his national Bolshevism the official reason for his departure. Individually Wolffheim was close to the rightist General Paul Emil von Lettow-Vorbeck whilst along with Laufenberg he had met with Ernst Graf zu Reventlow immediately prior to the Kapp Putsch.

== Later years ==
Following his expulsion from the KAPD Wolffheim became a member of the League for the Study of German Communism, a pro-nationalist group that included representatives of business and army officers amongst its membership. Wolffheim's membership of this group brought him into contact with elements on the fringes of the Nazi Party. However his involvement with Nazism was never more than perfunctory (probably due to his Jewishness) and he instead became associated with the Gruppe Sozialrevolutionärer Nationalisten, a national revolutionary group founded by the journalist Karl Otto Paetel in 1930. Arrested by the Nazis in 1936, he died in the Ravensbrück concentration camp in 1942.

== Written works ==
He wrote several texts with Laufenburg:

- Democracy and Organisation (1915)
- First Address to the German Proletariat (1919)
- May Appeal to Proletarians (1920)
- Communism Against Spartakism (1920)
- Moscow and German Revolution (1920)
