= Council communism =

Form of Left-Communism

Council communism or councilism is a current of left-communist thought that emerged in the 1920s. Inspired by the November Revolution, council communism was opposed to state socialism and advocated workers' councils and council democracy. Councilism is also opposed to Leninism and Stalinism. It was strongest in Germany and the Netherlands during the 1920s.

== History ==
=== Emergence ===
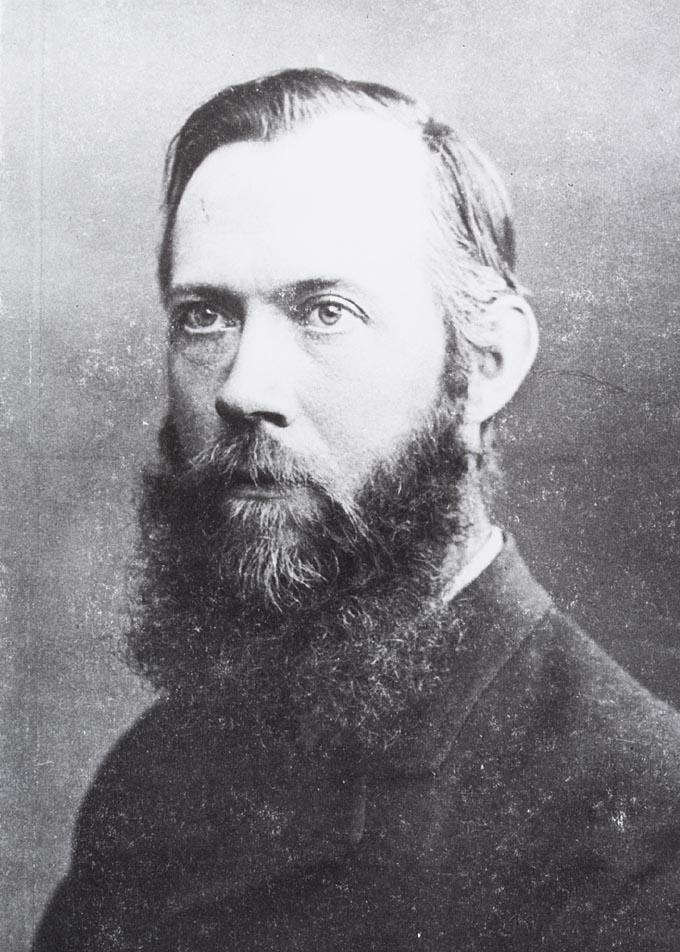
Anton Pannekoek in 1908

Council communism emerged in the years after 1918, as some communists in Germany and the Netherlands concluded that the Russian Revolution had led to power being concentrated in the hands of a new political elite. Its most prominent early proponents were the German educator Otto Rühle, the Dutch astronomer Anton Pannekoek, and the Dutch poet Herman Gorter. They were initially enthusiastic supporters of the Bolsheviks and the Russian Revolution. In 1918, Gorter said that the Bolshevik leader Vladimir Lenin "stands out above all other leaders of the Proletariat" and that Karl Marx was Lenin's sole peer. In 1919, Pannekoek wrote that "in Russia communism has been put into practice for two years now".

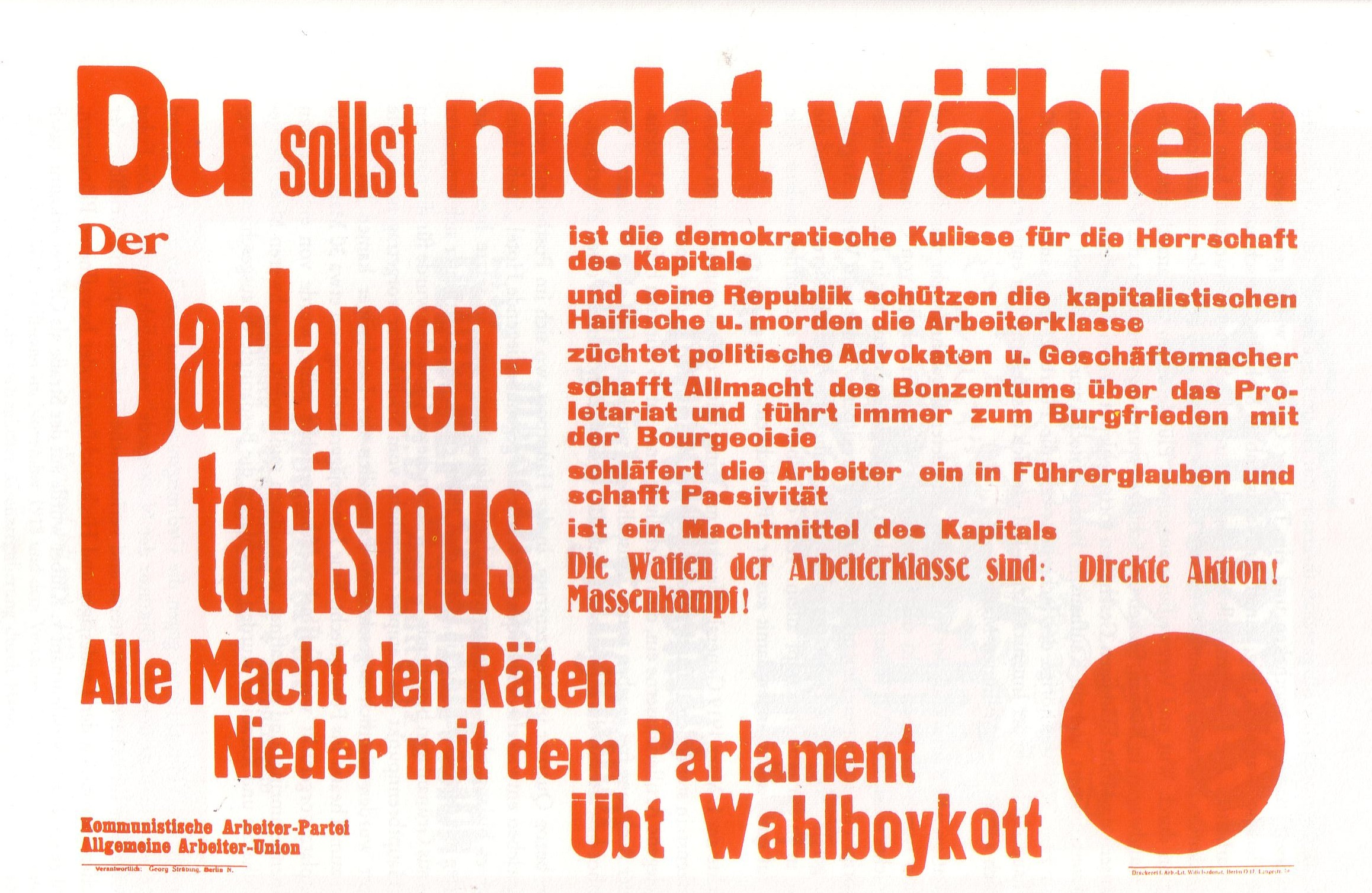
KAPD and AAUD placard calling for an election boycott in 1920

When the Communist Party of Germany (KPD) was formed in December 1918, a majority in the party was opposed to electoral politics and trade unionism. These positions placed it to the left of Bolshevik orthodoxy. In 1919, the Communist International (Comintern) was formed to promote Bolshevik policies internationally. In October 1919, Paul Levi, the head of the KPD leadership, pushed through a new party line that followed the Comintern's policies. This line called for participation in parliamentary elections and fighting for control of established labor unions. In effect, this forced the left majority out of the party and about half of its 100,000 members left. In April 1920, the left formed the Communist Workers' Party of Germany (KAPD) with an initial membership of about 38,000. The move was partly motivated by the fact that the left perceived the KPD's reaction to the Kapp Putsch as weak. The same year, the General Workers' Union of Germany (AAUD) was formed as a revolutionary labor union partly modeled on the American Industrial Workers of the World (IWW). It was seen by some as the union federation affiliate of the KAPD. At its peak in August 1920, the KAPD had around 40,000 members, with another 200,000 people organized in the AAUD.

In 1918, Gorter wrote the pamphlet The World Revolution pointing to differences between the situations in Russia and Western Europe. Pannekoek asserted in World Revolution and Communist Tactics, a pamphlet he published in 1920, that communist tactics in Western Europe were necessarily different from those in Russia. He argued that in Western Europe the bourgeoisie was more established and experienced and that as a result class struggle must oppose bourgeois institutions such as parliaments and trade unions. He emphasized the importance of class consciousness among the masses and deemed the vanguard party model advocated by the Bolsheviks a potential obstacle to revolution.

Immediately after the KAPD's formation, it sought admission to the Comintern. At the Second World Congress of the Comintern in 1920, the Comintern leaders Lenin, Leon Trotsky, and Grigory Zinoviev unanimously rejected the KAPD's positions. An open letter by the Comintern's executive committee informed the KAPD that the Comintern fully supported the KPD in its dispute with the left. Some KAPD delegates left the congress early in protest. Lenin criticized the KAPD, Pannekoek, and other left groups in the 1920 pamphlet "Left-Wing" Communism: An Infantile Disorder, accusing them of spreading confusion. He claimed that a refusal to work in parliaments and labor unions would leave workers under the influence of reactionary leaders. He conceded that there were considerable differences between Russia and the more advanced countries in Western Europe, but held that "it is the Russian model that reveals to all countries something – and something highly significant – of their near and inevitable future" and that certain features of the Russian Revolution were universally valid. Gorter took on the task of answering Lenin. His Open Letter to Comrade Lenin reiterated the argument that the differences in the class structure between East and West necessitated differences in communist tactics.

Despite this dispute, the KAPD, and other similar groups, initially sought to change the international communist movement from within. At the Third World Congress of the Comintern in 1921, the KAPD failed to rally a left opposition and therefore withdrew from the International. The council communist critique of Bolshevism became more fundamental. Council communists concluded that the Bolsheviks were not in fact building socialism. In 1921, Pannekoek argued that the Russian Revolution was but a bourgeois revolution like the French Revolution. Gorter characterized it as initially a dual revolution, a working-class revolution against capitalism and a capitalist revolution against feudalism, but argued that this dualism was resolved with the New Economic Policy of 1921 and that Soviet Russia had become unambiguously a capitalist state.

By 1921, council communism had broken with the official communist movement and formed a distinct current, according to the historian Marcel van der Linden. The term council communism itself was first used by Franz Pfemfert in 1921. Many authors agree with van der Linden in dating the emergence of council communism to the early 1920s, but others, like Philippe Bourrinet and John Gerber, refer to the tendency as the Dutch–German form of left communism during this period and date the advent of council communism to the 1930s. According to van der Linden, council communism was defined by five basic principles:

- Capitalism was in decline and had to be abolished immediately.
- It had to be replaced by workers' control over the economy through council democracy.
- The bourgeoisie manipulated the working class with its social democratic allies in order to maintain capitalism.
- This manipulation must be resisted by boycotting electoral politics and fighting traditional labor unions.
- The Soviet Union was not an alternative to capitalism, but a new type of capitalism.

The German and Dutch left was part of a broader left communist movement that pushed back against the imposition of the Bolshevik model on Western Europe. In Vienna, Georg Lukács emphasized the importance of the spontaneity of the working class. In Italy, Amadeo Bordiga was opposed to electoral politics, but had little regard for councils as the basis for a reorganization of society and advocated vanguard parties as Lenin did. In Russia, the Workers' Opposition criticized the bureaucratization of working-class organizations and sympathized with the KAPD.

According to Hans Manfred Bock, the leadership of the German council communist movement consisted mostly of intellectuals who had already been part of the left wing of the SPD before World War I as well as younger intellectuals, people with a Bohemian background and academics, who were radicalized by the war. Its membership consisted mostly of younger workers who had not been politically active before the war and former soldiers embittered by the brutality of the war.

In September 1921, the Communist Workers' Party of the Netherlands (KAPN) was formed as a Dutch analog to the KAPD. Gorter was supportive of this decision and became its chief spokesman, but Pannekoek was skeptical because he felt conditions for a new organization were not ripe in the Netherlands. The KAPN was modeled on the KAPD and its program was nearly identical to the German party's. It did not, however, manage to replicate the KAPD's mass base and never had more than 200 members. In Bulgaria, too, there was a left communist wing in the Communist Party. Led by Ivan Ganchev and influenced by the KAPD, the left formed the Bulgarian Communist Workers' Party (BRKP) in January 1922. It had just over a thousand members, mostly workers and few intellectuals. In the United Kingdom, the former suffragist Sylvia Pankhurst, also opposed to parliamentary politics, was excluded from the Communist Party of Great Britain (CPGB) in September 1921. She formed the Communist Workers' Party (CWP) in February 1922. It claimed to have 500 members, but likely had far fewer.

=== Decline ===
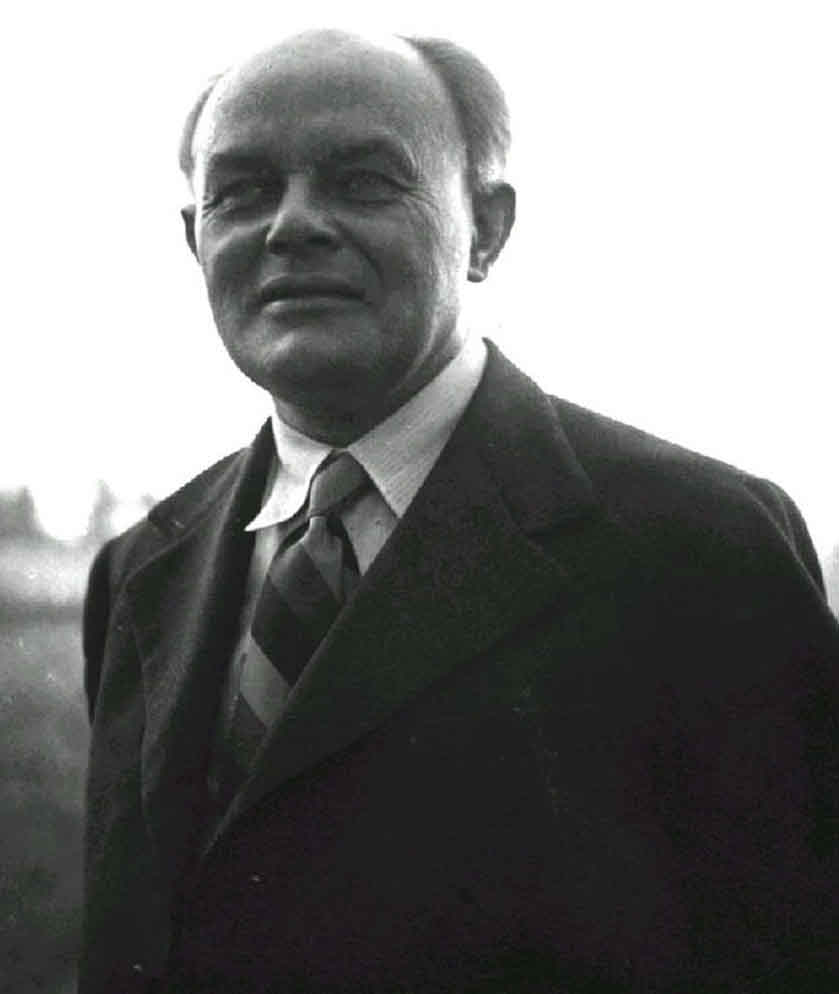
Otto Rühle around 1930

From its inception, the KAPD was beset by disputes and internal turmoil. The party was composed of a wide variety of political tendencies and it did not create stable organizations, as its proponents feared they could become bureaucratic and hold back the working class's revolutionary dynamic. As Weimar Germany stabilized in the early 1920s and the council movement of the German Revolution ebbed, the disputes became more pronounced.

As early as the KAPD's founding congress, Rühle and Franz Pfemfert, the editor of the journal Die Aktion, were opposed to any centralized party structures and the traditional division of the labor movement into political parties and economic labor unions. In his 1920 brochure Revolution is not a Party Matter, Rühle argued that the goal of the revolutionary movement was to take over production and therefore had no need for a party, which would necessarily become opportunist. Accordingly, Rühle and his supporters left the KAPD in November 1920 and, when it became clear that the pro-KAPD faction was in control of the AAUD in June 1921, they set up the AAUD–Unitary Organization (AAUD–E). The AAUD–E criticized the KAPD for differing from the KPD only in its rejection of parliamentarianism. At the KAPD's second congress in August 1920, the National Bolshevik wing of the party was expelled. This wing was led by Heinrich Laufenberg and Fritz Wolffheim. They supported a strong German nation that, after a successful proletarian revolution, would ally itself with the Soviet Union in a struggle against Western capital and militarism and also invoked anti-Semitic stereotypes.

The next major dispute in the KAPD concerned the formation of a new International opposed to the Comintern, the participation of the AAUD in wage struggles, and the role of the party's leadership around Karl Schröder. Schröder's leadership in the KAPD became increasingly controversial and he was perceived by some as attempting to exert dictatorial control. Politically, Schröder's faction argued that capitalism was in a final crisis that would lead to its demise, but that workers were not yet ready for capitalism's end as they were still under the control of reformist leaders. From this they concluded that the KAPD's role was to firmly adhere to strict revolutionary principles so it could lead workers at a later time. Schröder's opponents agreed that capitalism was in decline, but for them this implied the necessity of a struggle to win workers over and they were more open to flexibility in tactics such as participation in wage struggles, which Schröder dismissed as reformism. In March 1922, this dispute led to a split into an Essen tendency, led by Schröder, and a Berlin tendency, each with its own AAUD affiliate. The Berlin tendency was stronger, but most intellectuals in the KAPD including Gorter joined the Essen tendency. Pannekoek was exasperated by the factionalism in the movement and stayed out of the dispute, though he mostly sympathized with the Berlin tendency.

After the KAPD withdrew from the Comintern in 1921, its leadership decided to make plans for the formation of a new International. Schröder and Gorter supported this, but many in the organization were skeptical that the time was right for this move. In April 1922, after the party split, the Essen KAPD and the KAPN formed the Communist Workers' International (KAI). The BRKP and the CWP joined later. The KAI also claimed to have a Russian affiliate, but in reality it only consisted of two Russians living in Berlin. Gorter wrote the KAI's program. Its organizational structure was similar to the Comintern's, but it never attained any significant influence or activity. The split in the KAPD was replicated in the Bulgarian and Dutch organizations, as groups in each party supported the Essen KAPD and others the Berlin KAPD.

After 1922, the council communist organizations declined and disintegrated. The German organizations were down to 20,000 supporters in 1923 and just a few hundred by 1933. The Essen KAPD declined most quickly. In 1923, a faction left to form the League of Council Communists, most of whose members then joined the AAUD–E. In 1925, the Essen KAPD's main leaders including Schröder left to rejoin the SPD as they thought the revival of the council movement of the revolutionary period unlikely. In 1927, Gorter died and by 1929 the group could not afford to publish its newspaper. The Berlin KAPD, having lost its leadership and theorists to the Essen KAPD, spent the next years issuing repeated and widely ignored calls for insurrection. In 1927, it lost its AAUD affiliate which declared itself a party in its own right. The AAUD–E quickly became an assortment of individual groups and tendencies rather than a coherent organization. It lost its leading theorist Rühle in 1925, when he concluded that the political situation was too reactionary for revolutionary politics. In 1927, it merged with a group excluded from the KPD and a union organization to form the Spartacist League of Left Communist Organizations, which in turn merged with the Berlin AAUD in 1931 to create the Communist Workers' Union of Germany, but this organization had a membership of just 343.

By the early 1930s, council communism as a large-scale movement had come to an end. According to John Gerber, council communism was a product of the post-war turmoil and, as a result of the end of the council movement, the council communists' politics became abstract. He also attributes council communism's decline as a mass movement to failures by its proponents. They did not develop a politics that could survive under a stabilized capitalism. Council communists did not gain an understanding of the composition of the council movement, the reasons for its decline, and the influence of Leninism and democracy on workers. All this was exacerbated, according to Gerber, by council communists' dogmatism and a lack of leadership at the lower levels.

=== Continuation in small groups ===
After the Nazis took power in Germany in 1933, organized council communism disappeared, although a few groups continued in the resistance to the regime.

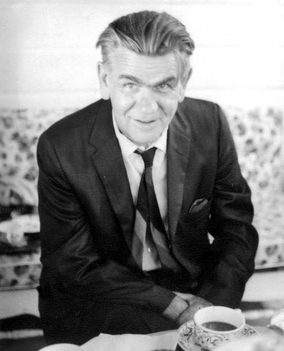
Paul Mattick in 1973

It continued in several small groups in the Netherlands. The Group of International Communists (GIC) became a coordinating center for international debates until the late 1930s. It published the movement's central texts, most prominently Henk Canne Meijer's "The Rise of a New Labor Movement" and Helmut Wagner's "Theses on Bolshevism". Council communists popped up in several other countries. The German emigrant Paul Mattick brought it to the United States where he published the International Council Correspondence. J.A. Dawson published the Southern Advocate of Workers' Councils in Australia and Laín Diez published council communist texts in Chile.

The 1960s student movement led to a brief resurgence of council communism, mainly in France, Italy, and Germany. After the decline of the 1968 movement, it mostly disappeared again, but for a few small groups in Europe and North America.

== Theory ==
While sharing a common general direction, council communists differed widely in their views on many issues.

In contrast to reformist social democracy and to Leninism, the central argument of council communism is that democratic workers councils arising in factories and municipalities are the natural form of working class organisation and governmental power, maintaining that the working class should not rely on Leninist vanguard parties or reforms of the capitalist system to bring socialism. Council communists see the mass strike and new, yet-to-emerge forms of mass action as revolutionary means to achieve a communist society. Where the network of worker councils would be the main vehicle for revolution, acting as the apparatus by which the dictatorship of the proletariat forms and operates.

The government and the economy should be managed by workers' councils composed of delegates elected at workplaces and recallable at any moment. As such, council communists oppose authoritarian socialism. They also oppose the idea of a revolutionary party since council communists believe that a party-led revolution will necessarily produce a party dictatorship.

Council communism and other types of libertarian Marxism, such as autonomism, are often viewed as being similar to anarchism due to similar criticisms of Leninist ideologies for being authoritarian and the rejection of the idea of a vanguard party. As such, it is referred to as anti-authoritarian and anti-Leninist Marxism.

=== Russian Revolution and the Soviet Union ===
While initially enthusiastic supporters of Lenin and the Russian Revolution, the future council communists emphasized differences between Russia and Western Europe as early as 1918. Gorter wrote in 1918 that the working and the capitalist class were both significantly weaker in Russia than in Western Europe, while the peasantry was much stronger and more rebellious and the state frailer. He concluded that a revolution would be more difficult in Western Europe than in Russia, though establishing socialism after a successful revolution would be easier. Gorter's only criticism of Lenin at this point concerned the latter's approval of national self-determination. In the following years the future council communists began to say that the differences in social conditions between Western Europe and Russia implied that the tactics to be employed by revolutionaries were necessarily different. From 1920 on, they started to distance themselves completely from Lenin and the Bolsheviks. According to Rühle, the Bolsheviks' attempt to institute socialism in a pre-capitalist society like Russia was doomed, as there was no economic foundation for this transition. Gorter wrote in 1921 that the Russian Revolution was a dual revolution: a communist revolution in the cities and a bourgeois peasant revolution against feudalism in the countryside. This duality, according to him, was resolved in favored of the bourgeois side with the introduction of the New Economic Policy in 1921. Rühle concluded in 1924 that Russian Revolution had been but a bourgeois revolution like the French Revolution and could not have achieved more than this given the prevailing historical conditions. This became the standard position of council communists, including Gorter and Pannekoek.

In 1933, the GIC published the "Theses on Bolshevism". The text was a product of discussions within the Rote Kämpfer, an illegal council communist-influenced group in Germany, and written by Helmut Wagner, possibly with the help of Karl Schröder. It was then discussed within the GIC, who revised it and published it without a named author. The "Theses" argued that a semi-feudal underdeveloped agriculture coexisted in 1917 Russia with a modern capitalist industry. This situation created the conditions for the Russian Revolution, which had to accomplish the historical tasks of the bourgeoisie, overthrowing absolutism and the nobility, without the support of the bourgeoisie, which had allied with Tsarism. The Soviet regime which grew out of this process, Wagner argued, was constantly oscillating between the interests of workers and those of peasants and could only resolve this contradiction through state violence. The Soviet economy, according to him, was still capitalist, as it was based on the production of commodities, workers were exploited, its goal was profitability, and there were incentive and reward systems to induce productivity. However, the economy was state capitalist, because surplus value went not to private capitalists, but was absorbed by the bureaucratic state apparatus. Council communists would later analyze other revolutions in underdeveloped countries, such as the Chinese Revolution, in a similar way.

After fleeing Germany in 1933, Rühle analyzed the Soviet Union, concluding that political system being established by the Nazis was similar to and partly inspired by the Soviet dictatorship. According to him, the capitalist West in general was gradually becoming state capitalist as a result of increasing monopolization and state intervention and state capitalism necessitated a dictatorship. In his writings in the late 1930s, he argued that the Bolshevik party had tended towards a cult of leadership, self-sacrifice, centralization, and discipline and that the Soviet Union was then built along the same lines. The Russian revolution had not ended class rule, but merely replaced the ruling class with a new stratum of state and party functionaries.

== Legacy ==
Council communism influenced several later radical groups and currents. One instance is the French group Socialisme ou Barbarie (Socialism or Barbarism; SouB), which existed from 1949 to 1965, was led by Cornelius Castoriadis, and mostly espoused an unorthodox Trotskyism. Two Dutch council communists were involved with SouB in the 1950s. Workers' council were discussed in SouB from 1953 on and there was a vigorous debate on whether they or vanguard parties were the correct form of revolutionary organization, particularly between Pannekoek and Castoriadis. There was also disagreement on the nature of the Russian Revolution, which Castoriadis viewed as an originally proletarian revolution which had degenerated into state capitalism. The Situationist International (SI) also drew some of its ideas about revolution from council communism, partly through Socialisme ou Barbarie, of which the Situationist theorist Guy Debord had briefly been a member. Whereas council communists and SouB had conceived of councils in a post-capitalist society as being primarily organized around labor, the SI viewed play as the central activity in such a society.

== See also ==
- Council republic
- Socialist self-management
- Workers' self-management
