= Communist Workers' International =

German-based council communist international

Communist Workers' International Kommunistische Arbeiter-Internationale
- Abbreviation: KAI
- Founder: Communist Workers' Party of Germany
- Founded: April 1922
- Dissolved: De facto: February 1927; De jure: February 1933
- Split from: Communist International
- Headquarters: Essen (1922–1927); Amsterdam (1927–1933)
- Ideology: Council communism
- Political position: Far-left

The Communist Workers' International (German: Kommunistische Arbeiter-Internationale, KAI) or Fourth Communist International was a council communist international. It was founded around the Manifesto of the Fourth Communist International, published by the Communist Workers' Party of Germany (KAPD) in 1921. It was founded in 1922 and dissolved in 1933.

== History ==
Following a split in the KAPD, members of the Essen Faction, including Herman Gorter and Karl Schröder, founded the KAI in April 1922, against the wishes of the party's Berlin Faction, who held that the formation of an international was premature. A founding congress was held from 2 to 6 April, with only delegates from the Essen Faction and the Communist Workers' Party of the Netherlands present.

The KAI was later joined by Sylvia Pankhurst's Communist Workers' Party in Britain, the Communist Workers' Party of Bulgaria and Gavril Myasnikov's Workers' Group in Russia. A Communist Workers' Party was also alleged to have been founded in Russia, though the party only consisted of 2 men, both of whom lived in Berlin. A similar incident occurred in 1924, when an Austrian KAP joined the international: whilst numbering some 20 militants in 1922, by 1924 its members were no more than 5, and the group quickly dissolved. The Berlin Faction were quick to liken these groups to Potemkin villages

The International was never able to organize joint activities and probably never reached 1,000 members, though the Bulgarian party was certainly the strongest numerically and the most internally unified. It was weakened by the divisions (and in some cases dissolution) of the parties that formed it, and the departure of the Russian Communist Workers' Group, who disagreed with its opposition to a united front with the Third International.

The KAPD's Essen Tendency dissolved in 1927, and the leadership of the International was passed to the Netherlands, as the Dutch group was the only party still holding membership, the other constituents being isolated individuals. It still nominally existed at the start of the 1930s, but undertook no international activity, only publishing work in the name of the organisation, until it was formally dissolved in February 1933.

== Organisation ==
The KAI's Executive was composed of 2 halves: the International Secretariat, made up of a small Bureau responsible to the international congress, and a larger Bureau made up of representatives from the international's constituent parties. The Executive Bureau was selected at each congress, partly as a measure to prevent the domination of the organisation by the Essen faction. Extraordinary congresses could be held if called for by a majority of national parties, and the number of delegates each constituent party were allotted was to be decided by the international congress itself.

The weakness of the international and its internal divisions meant the KAI was de facto ran by a Provisional Bureau, with several national groups.

== Bibliography ==
- Bourrinet, Philippe (2016). The Dutch and German Communist Left (1900–68) (PDF). Brill. ISBN 9789004325937. OCLC 7347928396.
- Dauvé, Gilles; Authier, Denis (1976). "Appendix I. The Groupuscular Phase". The Communist Left in Germany (1918-1921) – via Marxists Internet Archive.
- Hebbes, Ian (2005). "The Communist Left in Russia after 1920". The Russian Communist Left (1918-30). London: International Communist Current. ISBN 1897980108. OCLC 843024052.
