= Heinrich Laufenberg =

German politician (1872–1932)

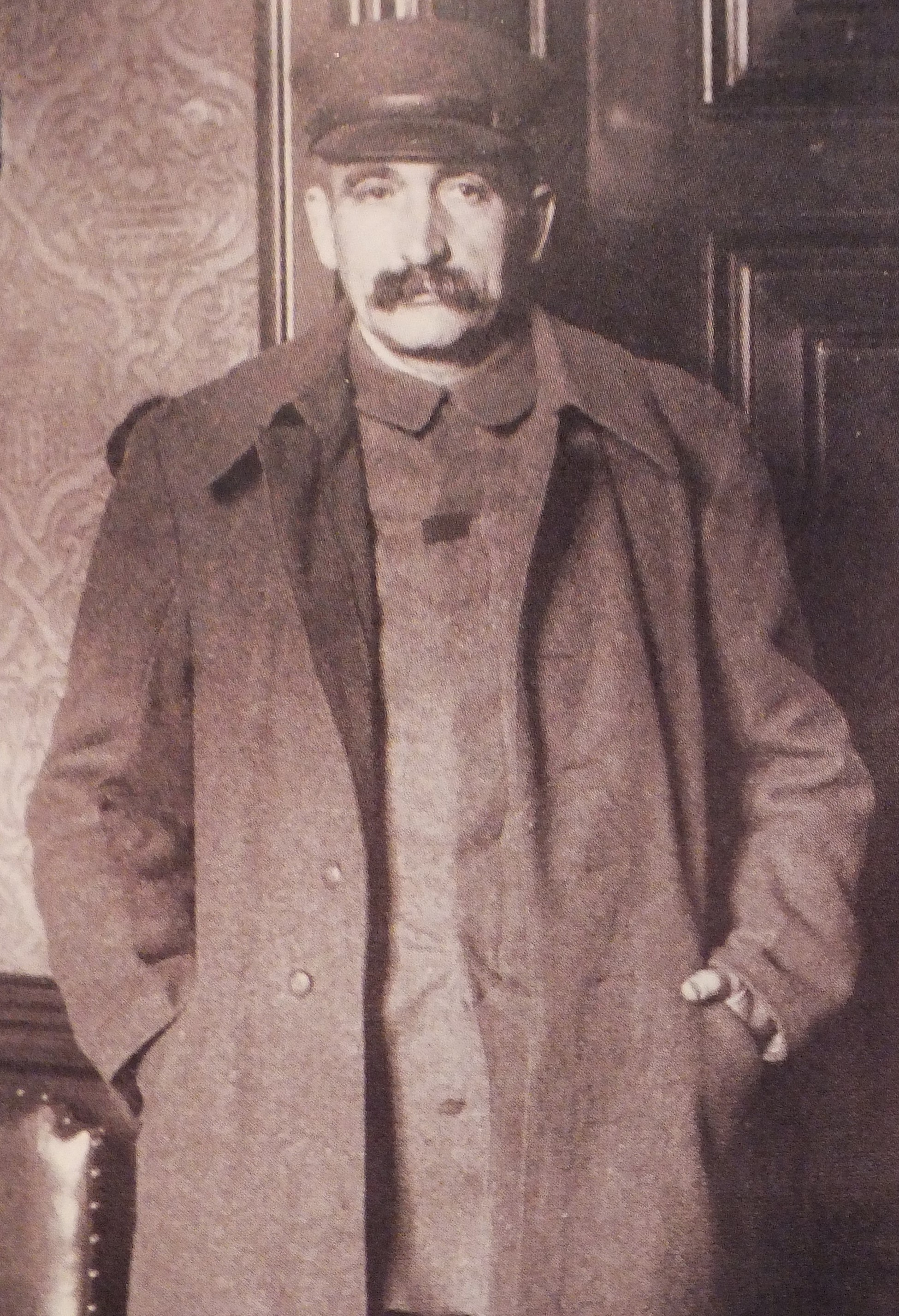
- Laufenberg in 1918
- Born: Heinrich Laufenberg; 19 February 1872; Cologne, Kingdom of Prussia, German Empire
- Died: 3 February 1932 (aged 59); Hamburg, Weimar Republic
- Citizenship: German
- Occupation: Academic
- Known for: Politician
- Political party: Centre Party (1902–1904); SPD (1904–mid-1910s); USPD (mid-1910s–1919); KPD (Jan–Oct 1919); KAPD (Apr–Aug 1920)

Heinrich Laufenberg (19 January 1872 – 3 February 1932) was a leading German communist and one of the first to develop the idea of National Bolshevism. Laufenberg was a history academic by profession and was also known by the pseudonym Karl Erler.

== SPD activism ==
Initially a member of the Centre Party, Laufenberg joined the Social Democratic Party of Germany (SPD) in the early 1900s. He became associated with a faction on the left of the party led by Wilhelm Schmitt and Peter Berten and when this group gained the upper hand within the Düsseldorf party in 1904 Laufenberg was appointed editor of the party organ Volkszeitung. Laufenberg also worked as an educationalist within the party, offering basic courses on socialism to party members of Düsseldorf. At this point in his career Laufenberg endorsed orthodox Marxism and supported Clara Zetkin in her ideological struggles with revisionists like Gerhard Hildebrand. He left the city in 1908 when he moved to Hamburg, leaving the Düsseldorf group without their leading intellectual.

== Hamburg leadership ==
In Hamburg Laufenberg continued to work on the left of the SPD before becoming a member of the Independent Social Democratic Party of Germany (USPD), which broke from the SPD following the SPD's support for German involvement in the First World War. Laufenberg's popularity grew as the war dragged on and people began to tire of involvement in the conflict.

On 30 November 1918, during the German Revolution, he was elected President of the Council of the Workmen and Soldiers of Hamburg. As head of this group Laufenberg oversaw the dissolution of Hamburg's Senate and Bürgerschaft and their replacement with Workers' Council government. Before long however he agreed to bring the two institutions back in what was seen as a concession to the city's business interests. Indeed, the banks in the city had threatened to withdraw credit to the city authorities if these institutions were not re-established. Under Laufenberg's lead the city suffered from severe food shortages and widespread strikes, resulting in his power base being eradicated further. Hamstrung by his reliance on the banks and criticism from the SPD Laufenberg's stock fell dramatically and he faced widespread demonstrations against his leadership. Unable to sustain his position, Laufenberg resigned on 19 January 1919 and handed leadership of the Council over to the SPD.

== National Bolshevism ==
Laufenberg was part of the faction within the USPD which left to establish the Communist Party of Germany (KPD) and before long the local party had come under the control of Laufenberg and his ally Fritz Wolffheim. The pair had been strong critics of German imperialism: in 1915 they had produced a pamphlet against German expansionism and attacking the SPD for being, as they saw it, complicit in such aggression. Following the war, in October 1919, the pair made contact with Karl Radek and suggested a policy to him that they were already calling 'National Bolshevism' (although it has also been suggested that it was Radek who coined the term for Laufenberg and Wolffheim's policy). They sought a dictatorship of the proletariat which would harness German nationalism and place the country back on a war footing against the occupying Allied armies in alliance with the Soviet Union. Within such an ideology the need for class war was to be placed to one side in favour of cross class co-operation in a war of national liberation. The idea initially met with some enthusiasm amongst members of the Spartacus League.

Such support soon ebbed however when Vladimir Lenin publicly denounced the policy, claiming that Laufenberg was seeking a war coalition with the German bourgeoisie, before branding him as "absurd". Soon Laufenberg and Wolffheim were expelled from the KPD after they attempted to resist the leadership of Wilhelm Pieck. Radek, after showing initial enthusiasm, soon also denounced Laufenberg's National Bolshevism vehemently.

== Later years ==
Laufenberg went on to become a founder member of the Communist Workers' Party of Germany (KAPD), joining Wolffheim at the Heidelberg conference establishing the party. By 1920 however he had been expelled from the party, with his national Bolshevism the official reason for his departure. Laufenberg became persona non grata in German communist circles and Radek, who had earlier been a critic, was accused of following his ways when he made a speech praising Albert Leo Schlageter in 1923. Unlike his ally Wolffheim, who became involved in groups on the fringes of the Nazi Party, he retired from politics and in 1932 was mourned as a pioneer of National Bolshevism by Ernst Niekisch who wrote that "in 1919 Laufenberg already thought in terms of continents".
