= Left communism =

Left-wing variant of communism

Left communism, or the communist left, describes a range of positions held by the left wing of communism, which criticises the political ideas and practices held by Marxist–Leninists, Trotskyists, and social democrats. Left communists assert positions which they regard as more authentically Marxist than the views of Marxism–Leninism espoused by the Communist International after its Bolshevisation by Joseph Stalin and during its second congress. There have been two primary currents of left communism since World War I, namely the Italian left and the Dutch–German left.

The Italian communist left is primarily made up of the Bordigist current and the Damenite current. These two currents mainly differ on the national question and the role of the communist party during a revolutionary period. Both currents denounce Marxism–Leninism as a form of bourgeois opportunism materialized in the Soviet Union under Stalin and remained within the Communist International as one fraction until their expulsion. The Italian current of left communism was historically represented by the Italian Socialist Party and the Communist Party of Italy, but today is embodied in the Internationalist Communist Party of Italy, International Communist Party, and the International Communist Current.

The Dutch–German left split from Vladimir Lenin prior to Stalin's rule and supports a firmly council communist viewpoint, as opposed to the Italian left which emphasised the need for an international revolutionary party. The Dutch–German current of left communism was historically represented by the Communist Workers' Party of Germany, General Workers' Union of Germany, and the Communist Workers' International.

Although she was murdered in 1919, before left communism became a distinct tendency, Rosa Luxemburg has been heavily influential for most left communists, both politically and theoretically.

Proponents of left communism have included Herman Gorter, Anton Pannekoek, Otto Rühle, Karl Korsch, Amadeo Bordiga, Paul Mattick, Onorato Damen, Jacques Camatte, and Sylvia Pankhurst. Later prominent theorists are shared with other tendencies, such as Antonio Negri, a founding theorist of the autonomist tendency.

== Early history and overview ==
Two major traditions can be observed within left communism, namely the Dutch–German current and the Italian current. The political positions those traditions share are opposition to popular fronts, to many kinds of nationalism and national liberation movements and to parliamentarianism.

The historical origins of left communism come from World War I. Most left communists are supportive of the October Revolution in Russia, but retain a critical view of its development. However, some in the Dutch–German current would in later years come to reject the idea that the revolution had a proletarian or socialist nature, arguing that it had simply carried out the tasks of the bourgeois revolution by creating a state capitalist system. The Dutch-German current criticised the Bolsheviks for use of the party form, and emphasised a more autonomous organisation of the working class without political parties. Damenites believe the Bolsheviks substituted the party in place of the class and had an economy of state capitalism. Bordigists begin their critique after the 2nd World Congress of the Communist International and characterize the economy as having developed into "state industrialism".

Left communism first came into focus as a distinct movement around 1918. Its essential features were a stress on the need to build a communist party or workers' council entirely separate from the reformist and centrist elements who "betrayed the proletariat", opposition to all but the most restricted participation in elections and an emphasis on militancy. Apart from this, there was little in common between the two wings. Only the Italians accepted the limited need for electoral work in elections in countries that have not firmly established bourgeois-democratic organs of government, attracting criticism from Vladimir Lenin in "Left-Wing" Communism: An Infantile Disorder.

The question of parliamentary participation would later contribute to the Internationalist Communist Party split in 1952 with Damenites favoring electoral activity such as with the 1946 Italian general election and 1948 Italian general election, while the Bordigists supported total abstention.

All currents have unique positions regarding trade union work. The Dutch-German current advocates for the immediate construction of revolutionary trade unions and worker organs, while the Damenites support the formation of new mass organizations outside the current trade unions, seeing the trade union form as historically obsolete and impossible to conquer everywhere. Bordigists still see the possibility of reconquering unions, although some currents deem certain unions impossible to agitate within or conquer.

Bordigists are distinct for their insistence on the organizational practice of organic centralism as opposed to democratic centralism, while Damenites adopt the term "dialectical centralism" to describe their practice. The Dutch-German current generally shuns centralism in favor of direct democratic procedures through class conscious workers without political parties.

== Russian left communism ==
Left Bolshevism emerged in 1907 as the Vpered group challenged Vladimir Lenin's perceived authoritarianism and parliamentarianism. The group included Alexander Bogdanov, Maxim Gorky, Anatoly Lunacharsky, Mikhail Pokrovsky, Grigory Aleksinsky, Stanislav Volski and Martyn Liadov. The Otzovists, or Recallists, advocated the recall of RSDLP representatives from the Third Duma. Bogdanov and his allies accused Lenin and his partisans of promoting liberal democracy through "parliamentarism at any price".

The faction largely died out by the end of 1918, as its leaders accepted that much of their program was unrealistic under the circumstances of the Russian Civil War and as the policies of War Communism satisfied their demands for a radical transformation of the economy. The Military Opposition and the Workers' Opposition inherited some characteristics and members of the Left Bolsheviks, as did Gavril Myasnikov's Workers Group of the Russian Communist Party during the debates on the New Economic Policy and the succession to Lenin. Most Left Bolsheviks were affiliated with the Left Opposition in the 1920s, and were expelled from the party in 1927 and later killed during Joseph Stalin's Great Purge.

== 1952–1968 ==
Examples of left communism ideological currents existed in China during the Great Proletarian Cultural Revolution (GPCR). For example, the Hunan rebel group the Shengwulian argued for "smashing" the existing state apparatus and establishing a "People's Commune of China" based on the democratic ideals of the Paris Commune.

== Since 1968 ==
The uprisings of May 1968 led to a large resurgence of interest in left communist ideas in France where various groups were formed and published journals regularly until the late 1980s when the interest started to fade. A tendency called communization was invented in the early 1970s by French left communists, synthesizing different currents of left communism. It remains influential in libertarian marxist and left communist circles today. Outside of France, various small left communist groups emerged, predominantly in the leading capitalist countries. In the late 1970s and early 1980s the Internationalist Communist Party initiated a series of conferences of the communist left to engage those new elements, also attended by the International Communist Current. As a result of these, in 1983 the International Bureau for the Revolutionary Party (later renamed as the Internationalist Communist Tendency) was established by the Internationalist Communist Party and the British Communist Workers' Organisation.

Prominent post-1968 proponents of left communism have included Paul Mattick and Maximilien Rubel. Prominent left communist groups existing today include the International Communist Party, the International Communist Current and the Internationalist Communist Tendency. In addition to the left communist groups in the direct lineage of the Italian and Dutch traditions, a number of groups with similar positions have flourished since 1968, such as the workerist and autonomist movements in Italy; Kolinko, Kurasje, Wildcat; Subversion and Aufheben in England; Théorie Communiste, Echanges et Mouvements and Démocratie Communiste in France; TPTG and Blaumachen in Greece; Kamunist Kranti in India; and Collective Action Notes and Loren Goldner in the United States.

== See also ==
- Marxism
- Orthodox Marxism
- Autonomism
- Authoritarian socialism
- Council communism
- Left-wing politics
- Left communism in China
- Libertarian socialism
- List of left-wing internationals
- List of left communists
- Luxemburgism
- Ultra-leftism
