= Communist Workers' Party of Germany =

Communist Workers' Party of Germany Kommunistische Arbeiterpartei Deutschlands (KAPD)
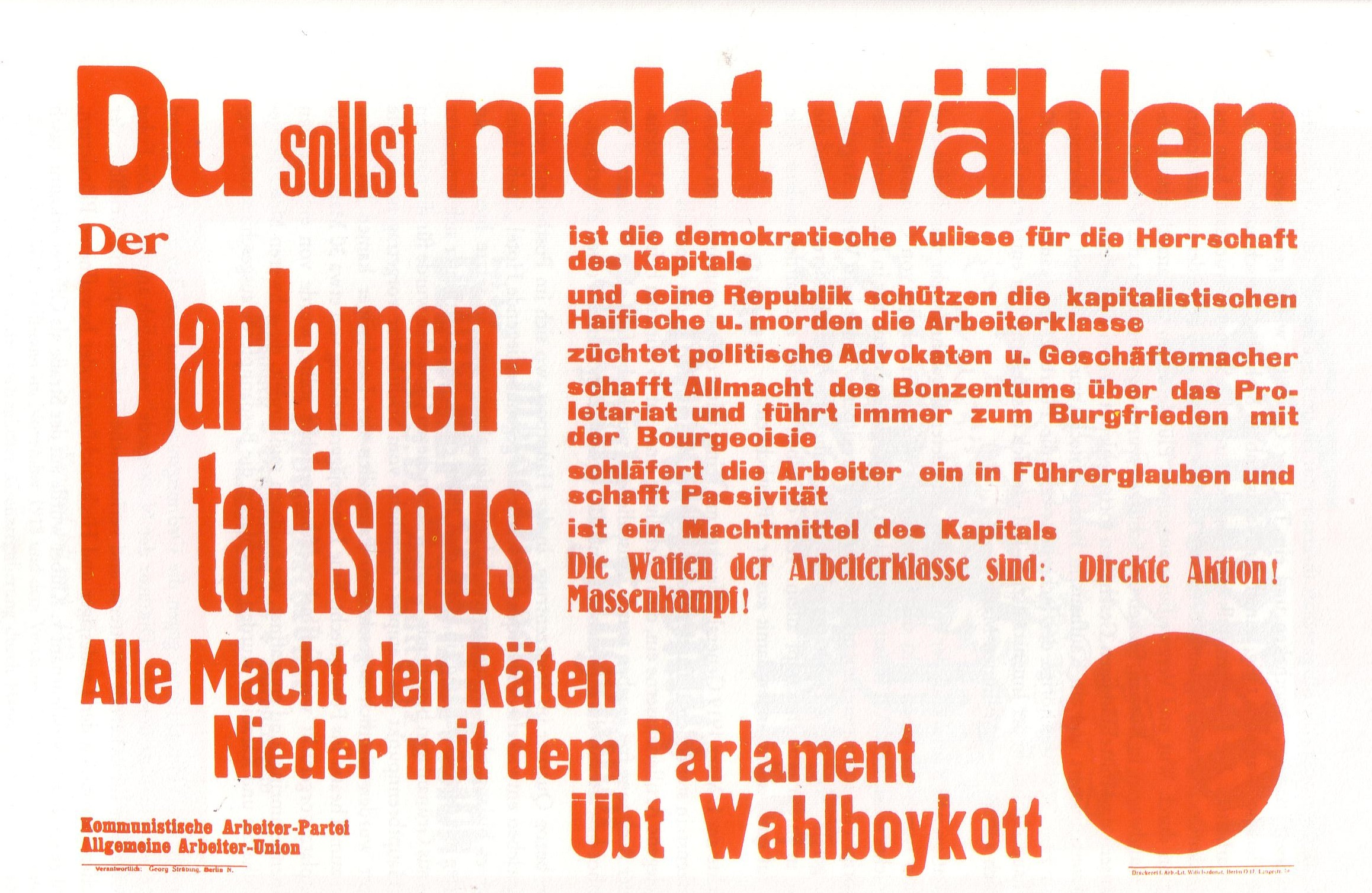
- Founded: April 1920
- Dissolved: March 1933
- Split from: Communist Party of Germany
- Merged into: Communist Workers' Union of Germany
- Newspaper: Kommunistische Arbeiter-Zeitung
- Membership (1921): 43,000
- Ideology: Left communism Revolutionary socialism Council communism
- Political position: Far-left
- International affiliation: Communist Workers' International
- Colours: Red

Party flag

The Communist Workers' Party of Germany (German: Kommunistische Arbeiterpartei Deutschlands, KAPD) was an anti-parliamentarian and left communist party that was active in Germany during the Weimar Republic. It was founded in 1920 in Heidelberg as a split from the Communist Party of Germany (KPD). Originally the party remained a sympathising member of the Communist International. In 1922, the KAPD split into two factions, both of whom kept the name, but are referred to as the KAPD Essen Faction and the KAPD Berlin Faction.

The KAPD Essen Faction was linked to the Communist Workers International. The Entschiedene Linke joined the KAPD in 1927.

== History ==
The roots of the KAPD lie in the left-wing split from the Social Democratic Party of Germany (SPD), calling itself the International Socialists of Germany (ISD). The ISD consisted of elements which were to the left of the Spartacus League of Rosa Luxemburg and Karl Liebknecht. The Spartacists and the ISD entered the Independent Social Democratic Party of Germany (USPD), the centrist splinter of the SPD, in 1915 as an autonomous tendency within the party. The left wing of the USPD, consisting of Spartacists and ultra-left council communists went on to form the Communist Party of Germany (KPD) in 1918. In 1920, the ultra-lefts of this party, mainly consisting of council communist members whose origins lay in the ISD, split from it to form the KAPD.

== Founding Conference, 4–5 April, 1920 Berlin ==
The KAPD was formed on 4 April 1920 by members of the left wing of the KPD who had been excluded at the Heidelberg Party Conference of the KPD (20–23 October 1919) by the central leadership under Paul Levi. Their main goal was an immediate abolition of bourgeois democracy and the constitution of a dictatorship of the proletariat, although they decided against a one-party dictatorship in the Russian model. The KAPD especially rejected the Leninist form of organisation along with democratic centralism, participation in elections, and activism within reformist trade unions, unlike the KPD. The Dutch communist theoreticians Anton Pannekoek and Herman Gorter played an important role within the KAPD; they had, on the model of the KAPD, formed the Communist Workers' Party of the Netherlands (KAPN), which however never attained a similar status to that of the KAPD.

The conference was attended by 11 delegates from Berlin with 24 from further afield, who together represented about 38,000 members.

The origins of the KAPD's establishment lay in the Kapp Putsch. In the view of KPD's left wing, this event had shown that the behaviour of the KPD party leadership was synonymous with giving up the revolutionary fight, as the KPD's position on the general strike had changed several times, and in the Bielefeld Agreement of 24 March 1920 the KPD had consented to the disarmament of the Ruhr Red Army. The Berlin district group on 3 April 1920 called a congress of the left wing. There it was decided to form the KAPD. The delegates, according to estimates, represented 80,000 KPD members. The newly formed party advocated the ending of parliamentary activities, and the active fight against the bourgeois state. In the coming period it worked closely with the General Workers' Union of Germany (AAUD). The main bastions of the party were in Berlin, Hamburg, Bremen and East Saxony, all places in which a large part of KPD members switched allegiance to the new party.

== First Ordinary Party Congress, 1–4 August 1920 ==
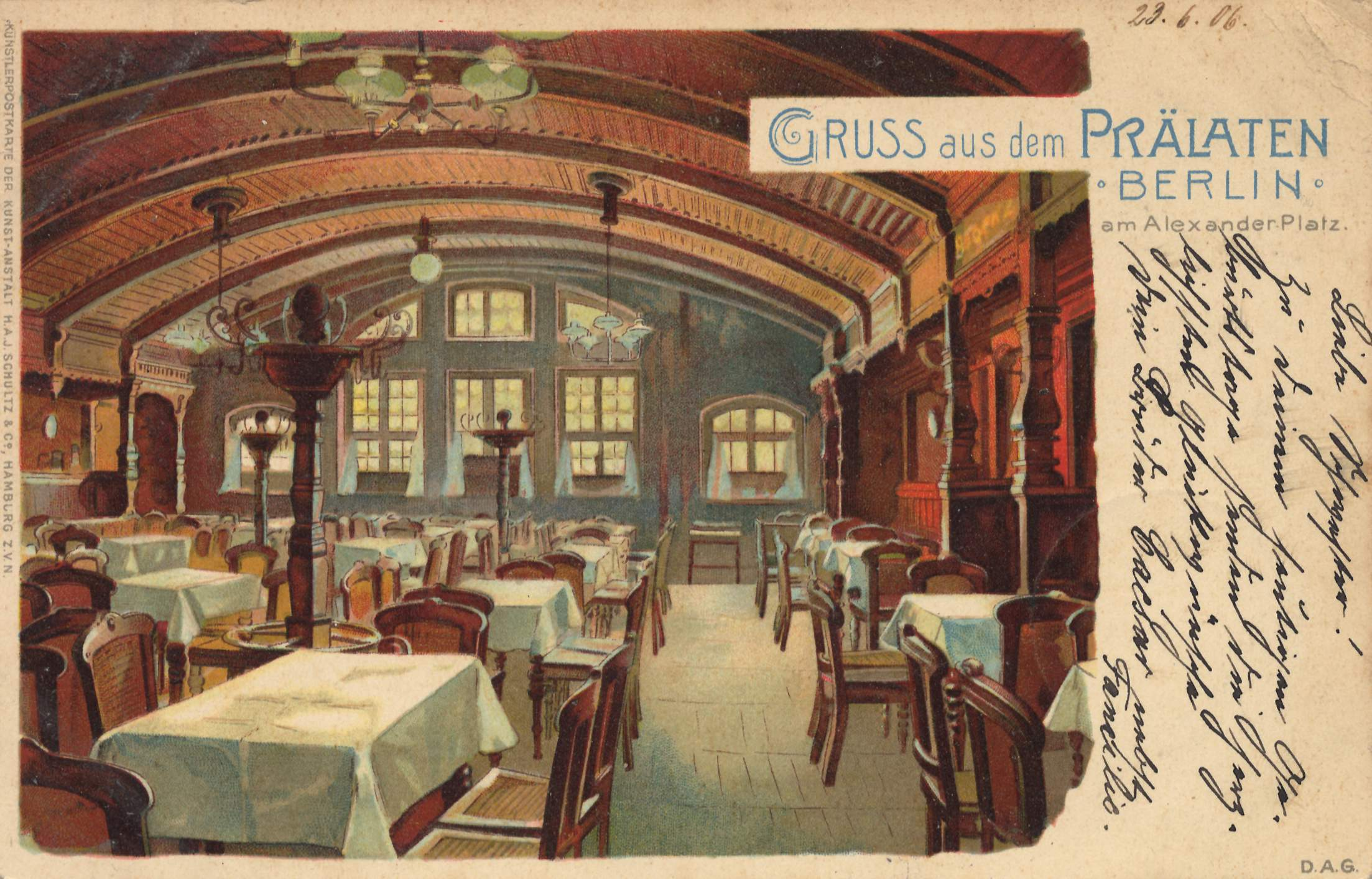
The Congress was held in the Zum Prälaten restaurant, Alexanderplatz

The Congress was held in the Zum Prälaten restaurant, Berlin. In August 1920, the founding members of the Hamburg branch were expelled, Heinrich Laufenberg and Fritz Wolffheim, who had advocated National Bolshevist ideas. From 1920 to 1921 the KAPD was a coopted member of the Third International.

In 1921 the KAPD cooperated again with the KPD during the March Action. This was triggered by Weimar Republic troops marching into the industrial region of Central Germany, and the KAPD and KPD's fear that the military intended to occupy the factories.

In 1921 a further fragmentation occurred, when parts of the AAUD around Rühle, Franz Pfemfert and Oskar Kanehl broke off from the KAPD and formed the AAUE.

After 1921, when the KAPD still had over 43,000 members, the party's influence declined more and more, and it separated in 1922 into the Berlin Tendency and the Essen Tendency around Alexander Schwab, Arthur Goldstein, Bernhard Reichenbach and Karl Schröder. The main reason was the Essen Faction's rejection of participation in workers' struggles in factories, in a situation seen as revolutionary. The Essen Tendency founded the Communist Workers' International, but dissolved in 1927. The Berlin Tendency was the larger and more enduring group, surviving until 1933, when it merged into the Communist Workers' Union.

== Affiliated unions ==
The AAUD was formed to combine factory organisations in opposition to the traditional trade unions, and was affiliated with the KAPD. The German leftists who formed the AAUD considered organising based on trades as being an outmoded form of organisation and instead advocated organising workers based on factories, thus forming the AAUD. KAPD leaders also considered the AAUD appropriate because it broke from the older, less revolutionary workers' organisations. The factory organisations in the AAUD were the basis for organising workers' councils.

A section led by Otto Rühle, based in Essen, split from the AAUD, forming the General Workers' Union of Germany – Unitary Organization (AAUD-E).

== Kommunistische Arbeiter Jugend ==
The youth wing of the party was the Kommunistische Arbeiter Jugend (KAJ) or Communist Workers Youth. They published a "struggle-organ", Rote Jugend, or Red Youth.

== Relations with the Comintern ==
The delegates of the KAPD to the 2nd World Congress of the Comintern were scorned and their speeches were restricted to a mere ten minutes. This was following the publication of Lenin's Left Wing Communism, which was written as a critique of the left-wing ideas of the KAPD, among other left-communist parties, including the KAPN. The Theses on the Role of the Communist Party in the Proletarian Revolution, adopted by the 2nd World Congress also explicitly criticize KAPD for their position about the role of the Communist Party. Following the exclusionary attitude shown towards them by the Comintern, the KAPD broke with the International in 1921. Historian E.H. Carr has argued that the 2nd World Congress—to some extent unintentionally and unconsciously—was the first to "establish Russian leadership of Comintern on an impregnable basis."

== Relations with the Italian Communist Left ==
The German left-communist opposition is sometimes confused with the Italian Communist Left or "Sinistra Comunista", which formed the Communist Party of Italy (PCd'I), and is today represented by the International Communist Party among others. While both opposed the Comintern, these two lefts had fundamental political differences- the role of the party, trade unions, class organisations and parties, anti-parliamentarism in principle, and others. Sinistra held same criticism towards KAPD as the Comintern on 2nd World Congress and these differences were not mended even as the Comintern grew increasingly distant from them both. Amadeo Bordiga, leader of the Sinistra in that time, who met members of KAPD in person in Berlin on his route to Moscow, in a 1926 letter to Karl Korsch he was skeptical of any joint action between the two lefts because of fundamental political divergences and stated: (...) We agree with Lenin's theses [on the Party's role] at the 2nd Congress. (...).

== Newspapers and journals related to the KAPD ==
The party published a newspaper, Kommunistische Arbeiter-Zeitung. On Mondays, the weekly Kommunistische Montags-Zeitung was published. It also published a monthly theoretical magazine, Der Proletarier, between 1920 and 1927.

== Prominent members of the KAPD ==
- Jan Appel
- James Broh
- Philipp Dengel
- Adolf Dethmann
- Minna Faßhauer
- Arthur Goldstein
- Herman Gorter
- John Graudenz
- Simon Guttmann
- Max Hoelz
- Paul Jahnke
- Cläre Jung
- Franz Jung
- Oskar Kanehl
- Paul Kirchhoff
- Karl Korsch
- Heinrich Laufenberg
- Rudolf Leonhard
- Paul Mattick
- August Merges
- Antonie Pannekoek
- Franz Pfemfert
- Karl Plättner
- Bernhard Reichenbach
- Otto Rühle
- Adam Scharrer
- Karl Schröder
- Richard Schubert
- Otto Schüssler
- Alexander Schwab
- Ernst Schwarz
- Heinrich Vogeler
- Frederick Wendel
- Fritz Wolffheim

== See also ==
- Council communism
- Left communism
- Communist Workers' Party of Bulgaria
- Communist Workers' Party of the Netherlands
