= General Workers' Union of Germany =

German left communist organisation

The General Workers' Union of Germany (German: Allgemeine Arbeiter-Union Deutschlands; AAUD) was a factory organisation formed following the German Revolution of 1918–1919 in opposition to the traditional trade unions.

The AAUD was formed by the left communists in the Communist Workers' Party of Germany (KAPD) who considered organising based on trades as being an outmoded form of organisation and instead advocated organising workers based on factories, thus forming the AAUD. They were influenced by the industrial unionism of the Industrial Workers of the World. The council communists organised these factory organisations as the basis for region-wide workers' councils.

A section of the AAUD led by Otto Rühle split from the AAUD, forming the Allgemeine Arbeiter-Union – Einheitsorganisation.

== See also ==
- Council communism
- Cuno strikes
- Factory committee
- Left communism
- Works council
