= Yury Lutovinov =

Russian Bolshevik revolutionary and labor leader

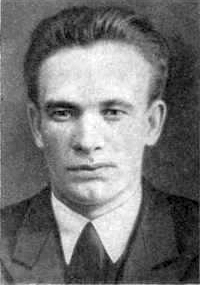
Yury Lutovinov

Yury Khrisanfovich Lutovinov (Russian: Юрий Хрисантович Лутовинов; Ukrainian: Юрій Хрисанфович Лутовінов; 1887–1924) was a Russian Bolshevik revolutionary and labor leader, of working-class extraction.

Lutovinov was born in Lugansk. He started work in metals factories in the Donbas as a teenager, and joined the Bolshevik Party in 1904. Lutovinov also was an activist in the Russian Metalworkers' Union. During World War I, Lutovinov worked at the Aivaz factory in Petrograd and helped arrange the transport of Bolshevik literature to the Donbas. In spring of 1918 he was a chairman of the Soviet government of the Lugansk Oblast and then the Donets-Krivoy Rog Soviet Republic. During the Russian Civil War, Lutovinov served at the Red Army and was a member of the Central Committee of the Communist Party (Bolsheviks) of Ukraine. He was in the central committee of the Russian Metalworkers' Union and a member of the All-Russian Central Council of Trade Unions. After the war Lutovinov was a member of presidium of the Central Council of Trade Unions. From 1919 to 1920 he was a secretary of the All-Russian Central Executive Committee (predecessor of the modern Russian parliament) and a chairman of the Lugansk county (Yekaterinoslav Governorate).

Lutovinov associated with the Workers' Opposition but held some views that were distinct from those of Alexander Shlyapnikov, the movement's leader. Lutovinov favored struggling for collegiality and against one-man management in industry, but put less priority than Shlyapnikov did on realizing workers’ control (through trade unions) of industry, presuming that the workers could not control industry until certain preconditions were met. In March 1920, Lutovinov presented Shlyapnikov's theses to the Ninth Congress of the Russian Communist Party (Bolsheviks). He was the chief spokesman for the Workers' Opposition at the Ninth Party Conference in September 1920, where he excoriated the Party leadership in a speech that was never published in its entirety. Lutovinov also sent a controversial letter to comrades in the CP(B)U in the fall of 1920. In fall 1920, he served in a Party committee on trade unions, but fell into conflict with Leon Trotsky, who left the committee after serving briefly. Lutovinov did not sign the program of the Workers' Opposition in December 1920, but he remained a critic of Russian Communist Party policy on trade unions, workers, and the economy. He aided the Workers' Opposition in election of delegates to the Eighth Congress of Soviets in December 1920.

By late January 1921, Lutovinov had become so discouraged with the policy of other leaders of the All-Russian Central Council of Trade Unions that he asked to resign from the Council. His letter of resignation attributed his decision specifically to his “sharp disagreement” with the Council majority on the trade union question. The other leaders approved Lutovinov's request to be removed from administrative work in trade unions, but they rejected his request to return to factory work. In March 1921, he was sent to Berlin to investigate the financial management of the embassy. From Berlin, he sent a letter supporting the violent suppression of the Kronstadt rebellion.

Recalled to Moscow in December 1923, Lutovinov was a lone voice at the communist party conference in January 1924, pleading that industrial wages should be protected.

Lutovinov committed suicide on May 7, 1924, disillusioned with the New Economic Policy and with the growth of bureaucracy within the Russian Communist Party.

== Bibliography ==
- Paul Flenley. "Yu.Kh.Lutovinov." P. 591. In T. Lane (ed.) Biographical Dictionary of European Labour Leaders, Greenwood Press, London
- "Юрий Хрисанфович Лутовинов", "Деятели СССР и октябрьской революции: автобиографии и биографии", том 1: 346
- А. Гуревич. "Десять лет ВСРМ", Металлист, 1917–1927, юбилейный номер (July 1927), 5
