= Workers Group of the Russian Communist Party =

1923–1930 faction of the Russian Communist Party

Workers' Group
- Leader: Gavril Myasnikov
- Founded: February 1923
- Dissolved: c. 1930
- Preceded by: Workers' Opposition
- Headquarters: Moscow
- Newspaper: The Workers' Way to Power
- Ideology: Left communism Council communism
- Political position: Far-left
- National affiliation: Russian Communist Party
- International affiliation: Communist Workers' International

The Workers Group of the Russian Communist Party (Russian: Рабочая группа РКП, romanized: Rabochaya gruppa RKP) was formed in 1923 to oppose the excessive power of bureaucrats and managers in the new soviet society and in the Russian Communist Party (Bolsheviks). Its leading member was Gavril Myasnikov.

The Workers Group defended that the Soviet state and public enterprises should be run by soviets elected from the workplace and that the New Economic Policy (NEP) was in danger of becoming a "New Exploitation of the Proletariat" if not controlled by the workers' democracy.

Its main activists were arrested in September 1923, and the group's activity was largely suppressed thereafter, although it continued to exist until the 1930s, inside prisons and possibly also underground.

== History ==
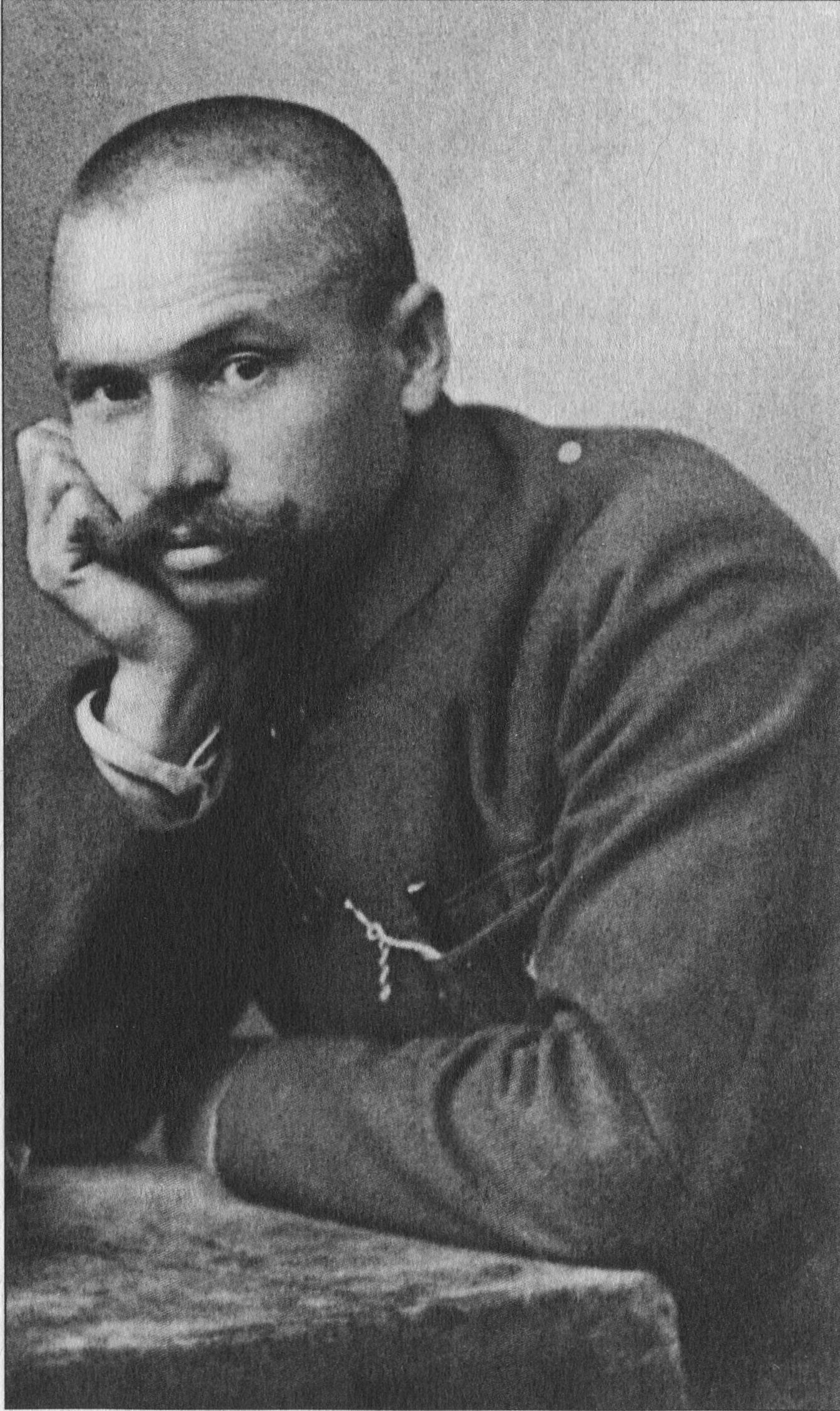
Gavril Myasnikov, prominent left communist and leader of the Workers' Group.

=== Background ===
In 1920, Gavril Myasnikov, then head of the Communist Party in Perm, in the Ural, began to express discontent with aspects of the evolution of the Soviet state, such as the progressive departure of the party leadership from the base militants, the growing number of non-workers in the party and in leading positions and the replacement of workers' control by "one-man management" in nationalized industries. After the party's 9th Congress, Miasnikov began to openly publicize his criticisms, advocating a return to the program presented by Vladimir Lenin in The State and Revolution: a radically democratic state without a centralized bureaucracy.

In the autumn of 1920, Miasnikov was transferred to Petrograd, but he soon came into conflict with Grigori Zinoviev and was again sent to the Urals. In 1921, he published a manifesto critical of the party line, advocating an end to the death penalty, the management of industry by workers' councils, and unrestricted freedom of the press ("from monarchists to anarchists"). The provincial party committee forbade him to defend his ideas in public meetings, but Miasnikov disobeyed, and after an exchange of letters with Lenin was expelled from the party in 1922.

=== The Workers Group ===
In 1923 Miasnikov (after having his request for readmission to the party rejected) organized the Workers Group, together with N.V. Kuznetsov (also expelled in 1922) and B.P. Moiseev. In February, the Group released its "manifesto", intending to influence the 11th Congress of the Communist Party, which was to be held in April. The text began to be smuggled around the Soviet Union, and by summer the Group had hundreds of adherents (about 300 in Moscow alone), mostly workers, and many from the Workers' Opposition.

Before the 12th Congress, an anonymous document (most likely authored by Miasnikov) circulated calling for the party to adopt the ideas of the Workers Group manifesto, and for Grigory Zinoviev, Lev Kamenev and Joseph Stalin to be excluded from the Central Committee; however, at the congress the Group's ideas were violently attacked by leading Bolshevik figures such as Leon Trotsky, Karl Radek and Grigory Zinoviev himself (at that time Lenin was already incapacitated for health reasons), with Miasnikov being arrested shortly thereafter and, in effect, exiled to Germany, where he contacted the Communist Workers' Party of Germany (KAPD), who helped him disseminate the Workers Group manifesto.

In the meantime, in the Soviet Union, the Group was being organized, under the leadership of Moiseev (from now on replaced by I. Makh) and Kuznetsov, and on June 5, 1923, organized a conference in Moscow and elected a Bureau. The Working Group followed a double line of action, since on the one hand its main leaders had been expelled from the Communist Party and the group was beginning to function as a clandestine alternative party, but on the other hand continued to regard itself as a faction of the Communist Party, trying to act as much as possible within it. The Workers' Group militants could be: a) Communist Party militants; b) former militants expelled from the Communist Party for political reasons; c) if they were not affiliated with any party, they were advised to join the Communist Party.

In August and September there was a wave of strikes in Moscow and other cities, apparently spontaneous and without links with opposition groups; the Workers Group planned to seize the occasion and call a general strike and a workers' demonstration (which would be led by a portrait of Lenin), but in September it was the target of widespread repression by the party leadership and the secret police (OGPU), with its leaders having been imprisoned, their literature confiscated and their workplaces closed.

=== Repression and disappearance ===
After the arrests, twelve members of the Workers Group were expelled from the Communist Party and several others were reprimanded. Miasnikov returned to the Soviet Union at the end of 1923 (having been promised he would be set free) and was immediately arrested, being internally exiled in 1927 to Yerevan, Armenia (he would flee the country in 1928, but returned in 1944 to only be arrested in January 1945, and executed in November of the same year).

According to the historian Paul Avrich, in 1924 the Workers Group had been effectively dismembered; however, according to Ian Hebbes the group would have continued to clandestinely produce manifestos and pamphlets until 1929, and continued to exist until the early 1930s Among Hebbes' sources is the French publication L'Ouvrier communiste, which claimed in 1930 (according to information from Miasnikov, then in Turkey) that in 1929, in the USSR, activists were accused of being linked to the Workers Group (namely of distributing their newspaper, Путь рабочих к власти - English: The Workers' Way to Power) continued to be arrested and expelled from the Communist Party. Also according to the Soviet police interrogation of Miasnikov in 1945, the Workers' Group was still functioning in 1928, and Miasnikov would have frequent meetings in Yerevan with envoys from the group's Central Bureau (it would have even been the Bureau to decide Miasnikov's flight from the USSR, following the illegal publication of his pamphlet What is the Workers' State).

== Program ==
The Workers Group considered that a new oligarchy was being formed, made up of senior Party leaders, company directors, etc. and defended:

- the election of workers' councils in all nationalized factories and their participation in management;
- the election of company directors, union leaders and central authorities by the congresses of workers' councils;
- freedom of expression for all manual workers;
- the role of trade unions in private companies in their function of controlling their managers, namely ensuring compliance with labor laws and paying taxes;
- autonomy and internal democracy in the communist parties of the various nationalities of the Soviet Union;
- the abolition of the Council of People's Commissars and the assignment of its functions to the All-Russian Central Executive Committee;
- at the international level, refusal of the Communist International strategy of alliances with the parties of the Second International and the "2+1/2 International".

=== Attitude towards the NEP ===
Although authors like Paul Avrich or John Marot affirmed that the Workers Group considered New Economic Policy (NEP) as the "New Exploitation of the Proletariat", which, in its manifesto, defended that the NEP was inevitable given the economic backwardness of the Russia, which, particularly in agriculture, would be heavily dependent on small producers. The expression "New Exploitation of the Proletariat" is referred to as something the NEP was at risk of becoming if not controlled by "proletarian democracy", as it favored the emergence of a privileged group. References that the group presented the NEP as a "new exploitation" seem to have had their origin in the book Rabochaia gruppa ("Miasnikovshchina"), by Vladimir Gordeevich Sorin, published in 1924 and representing the official position of the Communist Party on the faction.

== Relationship with other opposition factions ==
Miasnikov was a "Left Communist" in 1918; later had contacts with the Workers Opposition, but without having formally integrated into it, and was one of the subscribers (along with former members of the Workers Opposition, such as Alexander Shliapnikov and Alexandra Kollontai) of the "Charter of the 22", drafted in 1922 advocating more internal democracy and freedom of opinion within the party. In addition, a large part of the militancy of the Workers Group came from the Workers' Opposition, and Kollontai was even invited to participate in a demonstration organized by the group.

The Workers Group manifesto has a critical attitude towards two other opposition groups of the same time: the Democratic Centralists and the Workers' Truth, accusing the former of only being concerned with democracy within the party and not for the proletariat, and the latter of actually accepting and promoting the restoration of capitalism.

Later, the Workers' Group approached some of the other factions: in August 1928, the Workers' Group held a conference in Moscow where it approved an appeal to the "Group of 15" (a faction derived from the Group of Democratic Centralism) and to the remnants of the Workers' Opposition to adopt a common program, and where a proposal of statutes for a "Workers' Communist Party" was discussed bringing together the Workers' Group and the Group of 15. In the 1930s, in the Vorkuta labor camp, it was constituted a "Federation of Left Communists" bringing together prisoners from the Workers' Group, Democratic Centralists and some Trotskyists.

Already in exile, Miasnikov established links with Trotsky (who had attacked him in the early 1920s, but who in the meantime came to defend very similar positions regarding internal party democracy and the strategy of the Communist International, albeit in disagreement with regard to the nature of the Soviet Union, which for Trotsky continued to be a "workers' state", while Miasnikov considered it to be "State Capitalist").

== International alignment ==
The Workers' Group was linked to the Communist Workers' Party of Germany (KAPD) and the Communist Workers' International (KAI); but it would later break with the KAI for refusing any united front with the parties of the Communist International, in counterpoint to the Workers Group's line of continuing to work within the Soviet Communist Party.

Around 1930, Miasnikov, in exile, and the Workers' Group (so far as it still existed as an organization) were associated with the "Communist Workers' Groups" in France, and with their newspaper L'Ouvrier Communiste, a dissident group of Bordigism however ideologically aligned with the German and Dutch tradition of the Communist left.

== Bibliography ==
- Avrich, Paul (1984). "Bolshevik Opposition to Lenin: G. T. Miasnikov and the Workers' Group". The Russian Review. 43 (1): 1–29. doi:10.2307/129715. ISSN 1467-9434. JSTOR 129715. LCCN 43016148. OCLC 473067959. Archived from the original on 3 May 2012.
- Hebbes, Ian (2005) [1998]. "The Communist Left in Russia after 1920". In ICC (ed.). The Russian Communist left. London: International Communist Current. ISBN 9781897980101. OCLC 843024052.
- Olivier, Michel (2009). "Eléments d'histoire du Groupe Ouvrier du parti communiste russe 1923 – 1937". Le Groupe ouvrier du Parti communiste russe (1922-1937). Contribution à l’histoire de la Gauche communiste (in French). Toulouse: Collectif d'édition Smolny. OCLC 943961753.
- Pirani, Simon (2008). The Russian Revolution in Retreat, 1920–24 (PDF). BASEES/Routledge Series on Russian and East European Studies. Vol. 45. London: Routledge. ISBN 9781134075508. OCLC 254159044.
