= Workers' Truth =

1921–1923 faction of the Russian Communist Party

Workers' Truth Рабочая Правда
- Founded: September 1921
- Dissolved: December 1923
- Split from: Communist Party of the Soviet Union
- Preceded by: Proletkult
- Newspaper: Workers' Truth
- Ideology: Left communism
- Political position: Far-left

The Workers' Truth (Russian: Рабочая Правда, romanized: Rabochaya Pravda) was a Russian socialist opposition group founded in 1921. They published a newspaper with the same name, Workers' Truth, which first appeared in September 1921.

The Workers' Truth considered that the Soviet economy had been transformed into a form of capitalism, with the technical managers and organizers as a new ruling class, together with the private entrepreneurs that emerged with the New Economic Policy (NEP), the Communist Party having become the representative of that ruling class, and no longer of the proletariat. Thus, the Workers' Truth, although continuing to act within the Communist Party, defended the need to create a new workers' party.

Its main activists were arrested in September 1923—the group's activity being largely suppressed thereafter—and expelled from the Communist Party in December of the same year.

== Ideas ==
Their programmatic statement (the "Appeal/Message to the Revolutionary Proletariat and to All Revolutionary Elements Who Remained Faithful to the Struggling Working Class") was released in January 1923 by Sotsialisticheskii Vestnik, a Menshevik newspaper edited in Berlin.

They argued that during World War I "military-state capitalism" had accelerated the tendency towards centralization of economic management and had given rise to a new bourgeois class, composed of the most effective elements of the old bourgeoisie together with new elements drawn from the technical organising intelligentsia. They claimed that although the Russian Communist Party had been the party of the working class, it had become "the party of organisers and directors of the governmental apparatus and economic life along capitalist lines", and that these (like the private entrepreneurs that emerged with the New Economic Policy) led a life of privilege. To combat this situation, they proposed the formation of secret propaganda circles in the workplace, in trade unions and other workers' organisations, as well as within the Communist Party and its affiliates.

The group considered it necessary to create a workers' party (albeit, at least provisionally, accepting the existing government and the Communist Party), from both non-party workers and Communist Party affiliates, advocating proposals such as:

- Freedom of expression and association for "revolutionary elements of the proletariat";
- Fight against administrative arbitrariness;
- End of the "fetish" of reserving the right to vote for workers;
- Defense of the economic interests of the proletariat and compliance with labor laws;
- Good relations between the USSR and what they considered "advanced capitalist countries" - Germany and the USA - and boycotting "reactionary" France;
- Support for the national bourgeoisie of countries like China, India or Egypt against colonialism.

== Origins ==
The intellectual roots of the Workers' Truth are most likely in the Proletkult movement, and above all in the manifesto of the "Collectivists", published in 1921 by some elements of this movement (and possibly also linked to the Workers' Opposition), warning of the danger of bureaucratic intelligentsia becoming a ruling class in a capitalist state.

The Workers' Truth activists were mostly students and from the "red" academies, that is, the higher education institutions created for the purpose to form the intellectuality of the new regime. Nevertheless, they argued that promoting cultural work among industrial workers was more important than funding universities, as these would be frequented by ex-workers who would join the technocrats.

== Relationship with other opposition groups ==
The Workers' Truth considered that the Mensheviks, while making a good analysis of the ideological and sociological evolution of the Communist Party, defended reactionary positions in the economy by defending the return of the expropriated companies to their former owners, while the Socialist Revolutionaries had lost their social base (the peasantry). The Workers' Opposition, on the other hand, had revolutionary elements among its supporters (which Workers' Truth tried to captivate), but an "objectively reactionary" program, which meant returning to the methods of "war communism".

For its part, the Workers' Group, led by Gavril Myasnikov, in its manifesto, accused the Workers' Truth of in practice (by saying that Russia was already capitalist) accepting and promoting the restoration of capitalism, and limiting the working class to fight only for better salaries.

== Repression ==
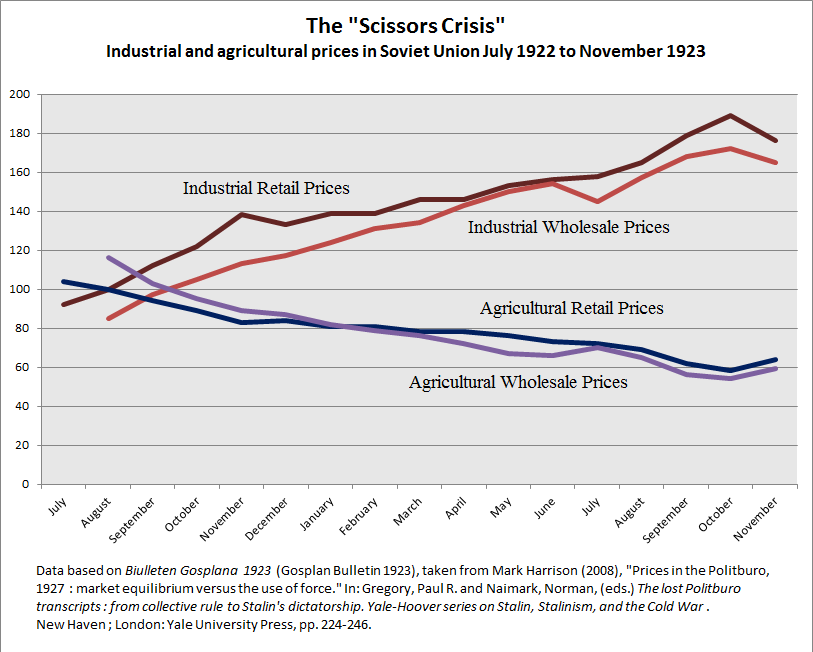
The Scissors: retail and wholesale prices of agricultural and industrial goods in the Soviet Union July 1922 to November 1923.

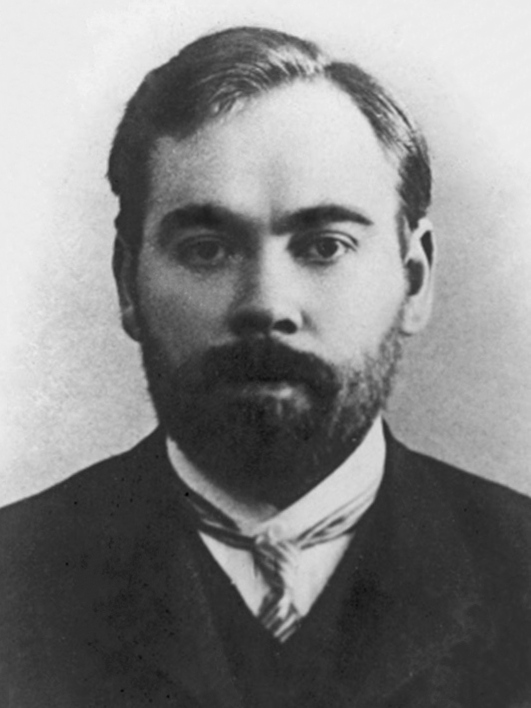
Alexander Bogdanov, detained during the 1923 arrests.

In August 1923 a wave of strikes spread across Russian industrial centres, sparked off by the economic crisis that had arisen earlier that year (associated with the rise in the prices of industrial goods compared to those of agricultural products - the so-called "scissors").

Fearing that dissident communist groups like Workers' Truth or the Workers' Group could capitalize on the labor unrest to gain support among the working class, the Communist Party leadership decided to take action against them. On 8 September 1923 the Soviet secret police arrested several people accused of having links with Workers' Truth, such as Fanya Shutskever, Pauline Lass-Kozlova, Efim Shul'man, Vladimir Khaikevich and also the philosopher and "old Bolshevik" Alexander Bogdanov. Bogdanov denied any organisational involvement with them, although they had claimed that they were inspired by his views, and demanded for a face-to-face meeting with Felix Dzerzhinsky, with whom he spoke twice before being released on 13 October.

In December 1923, Fanya Samoilova Shutskever, Efim Rafailovich Shul'man, Vladimir Markovich Khaikevich, Yakov Grigorevich Budnitsky, Pauline Ivanovna Lass-Kozlova, Oleg Petrovich Vikman-Beleev, and Nellie Georgievna Krym were identified as the leaders of Workers' Truth and expelled from the Communist Party (at least Fanya Shutskever and Pauline Lass-Kozlova would be reinstated in the party, in 1926 and 1927, respectively; Shutskever would be arrested again in 1938).

With the arrests of September 1923, the Workers' Truth was effectively dissolved.

== See also ==
- Workers Group of the Russian Communist Party

== Bibliography ==
- "Vozzvanie gruppy Rabochaya Pravda". Sotsialisticheskii Vestnik (in Russian). 49 (31). Berlin: 12–14. 31 January 1923.
- Halfin, Igal (2000). "The Ultra-Left: Workers' Truth". From Darkness to Light: Class, Consciousness, and Salvation in Revolutionary Russia. Pitt Series in Russian and East European Studies. University of Pittsburgh Press. pp. 378–382. ISBN 9780822972044.
- Pirani, Simon (2008). The Russian Revolution in Retreat, 1920–24: Soviet workers and the new communist elite (PDF). BASEES/Routledge Series on Russian and East European Studies. Vol. 45. Routledge. ISBN 9781134075508.
