= 7th Congress of the Russian Communist Party (Bolsheviks) =

Political party congress

The 7th (extraordinary) Congress of the RSDLP(b) (Russian Social Democratic Labor Party), also known as the Extraordinary 7th Congress of the RCP(b) (Russian Communist Party (Bolsheviks)), was held between 6–8 March 1918. During this congress the Bolsheviks changed the name of the party to include the word "Communist".

It was the first congress of the Bolsheviks after their gaining of power in the October Revolution. It was held in the Taurida Palace in Petrograd (St. Petersburg) in extraordinary session to consider the peace treaty with Germany to end World War I, concluded by the Treaty of Brest-Litovsk earlier in March.

The 47 plenipotentiary and 59 consultative delegates represented about 17,000 Party members. The actual Party head count was about 300,000, but many delegates could not arrive on such short notice, partially because of the German occupation of significant territory.

The agenda was:

- Report of the 6th Central Committee (delivered by Vladimir Lenin)
- War and peace
- Revision of the Party Programme, including the change of the name of the Party
- Miscellanea
- Elections of the 7th Central Committee

This Congress created All-Russian Bureau of Military Commissars, i.e. the political department of the future Soviet armed forces.

== Brest Peace ==
The Brest Peace was an issue of fierce controversy within the Party. The Brest Peace was opposed by the faction of the Left Communists, who were led by Nickolay Bukharin and were influential in the major party organizations: in Moscow, Petrograd, and the Urals. There was little unity among the supporters of the Brest Peace. After Lenin's report, Bukharin presented a second report, demanding that the war with Germany continue.

After heated discussions, Lenin's version of the Resolution On War And Peace was approved at the morning session of March 8 by a signed vote: 30 in favor, 12 against, 4 abstained. Lenin's proposal, was not made public at that time and was first published in the January 1, 1919 Kommunar, a daily newspaper issued by the Central Committee for workers in Moscow.

The Brest Peace was ratified by the Extraordinary Fourth All-Russia Congress of Soviets (March 14–16).

=== List of elected members to the Central Committee ===
The Contress elected the following members to the Central Committee (by number of received votes):

Elected Members

1. Lenin (Ulyanov) Vladimir Ilyich
2. Trotsky Lev Davidovich
3. Sverdlov Yakov Mikhailovich
4. Zinoviev Grigorii Evseevich
5. Bukharin Nikolai Ivanovich
6. Stalin Iosif Vissarionovich
7. Sokolnikov Grigori Iakovlevich
8. Krestinsky Nikolai Nikolaevich
9. Smilga Ivar Tenisovich
10. Stasova Elena Dmitrievna
11. Lashevich Mikhail Mikhailovich
12. Shmidt Vasilii Vladimirovich
13. Dzerzhinsky Feliks Edmundovich
14. Vladimirsky Mikhail Fedorovich
15. Artem (Sergeev Fedor Andreevich)

Candidates

1. Ioffe Adolf Abramovich
2. Kiselev Aleksei Semenovich
3. Berzin Ian Antonovich
4. Uritsky Moisei Solomonovich
5. Stuchka Petr Ivanovich
6. Petrovsky Grigory Ivanovich
7. Lomov (Oppokov) Georgy Ippolitovich
8. Shliapnikov Aleksandr Gavrilovich
