= All-Russian Metalworkers Union =

The All-Russian Metalworkers Union was a Russian Trade Union founded in 1917.

The Metalworkers played a major role in the Third All Russian Conference of Trade Unions (20–28 June 1917). They organised their own conference to run in parallel with the larger conference and set up their Provisional Executive Committee at this time. They represented 400,000 workers

The first conference was organised in St Petersburg in January 1918, with delegates representing 600,000 workers.

Yury Lutovinov, a member of the Workers' Opposition was a prominent member of this union.
