= Ban on factions in the Communist Party of the Soviet Union =

Homogenization of 1920s Communist Party leadership under Lenin

In 1921, factions were banned in the Russian Communist Party (Bolsheviks) according to democratic centralism. Vladimir Lenin described the ban as temporary and had criticised a proposed amendment for a permanent ban as "excessive" and "impracticable". Contemporary analysts deemed it a temporary ban.

== Background and context ==
Since 1920 a majority of the Congress of the Communist Party of the Soviet Union had become concerned about opposition groups within the Communist Party. For example, the Democratic Centralists had been set up in March 1919 and by 1921 Alexander Shliapnikov had set up the Workers' Opposition. Prior to the introduction of the factional ban in 1921, Leon Trotsky had a considerable following among the party activists and members of the Central Committee against the narrow majority supporting Lenin. His supporters also controlled the newly established Orgburo and the Party Secretariat before the appointment of Joseph Stalin as General Secretary. The Congress regarded these as distractions within the party when unity was needed in order to neutralise the major crises of 1921, such as the famines, and Kronstadt rebellion.

== Resolution on Party Unity 1921 ==
Factions were also commencing to criticize Lenin's leadership. Consequently, the 10th Party Congress passed a Resolution On Party Unity, a ban on factions to eliminate factionalism within the party in 1921. The resolution stated as follows.

- Under the present conditions (apparently, the ongoing Kronstadt rebellion), party unity was more necessary than ever.
- The Kronstadt rebellion was being exploited by "the bourgeois counter-revolutionaries and whiteguards in all countries of the world" in order to "secure the overthrow of the dictatorship of the proletariat in Russia".
- Criticism, "while absolutely necessary", was supposed to be "submitted immediately, without any delay", that is, without prior deliberation in any faction, "for consideration and decision to the leading local and central bodies of the Party."
- The "deviation towards syndicalism and anarchism" was rejected "in principle", but the central proposals of the Democratic Centralism group were accepted.
- All factions were dissolved.

== The ban on factions after Lenin's death ==
Faction members (such as members of "Workers' Truth") would be expelled from the Party in December 1923. Big opposition factions (such as Leon Trotsky's 'Left Opposition' and such as oppositionist groups around Nikolai Bukharin and Grigory Zinoviev) again appeared after the civil war ended. These factions were tolerated for several years, leading some Marxists to claim that the ban on factions was intended to be temporary. When Trotsky and Zinoviev were expelled on November 12, 1927, the ban on factions was however used to justify this. Lenin himself had held the position that a permanent ban on oppositional platforms was impossible to implement, noting that if a question such as the Brest-Litovsk peace were to come up again, voting based on platforms would be necessary. Regardless, voting upon such oppositional platforms was considered factionalism and thus banned during Stalin's reign.

Historians T. H. Rigby and Sheila Fitzpatrick believe that the autumn purges of 1921 were also connected to the ban on factions. In the process of the purge, every Communist was subpoenaed in front of a purge commission and forced to justify their credentials as a revolutionary; Lenin argued this was necessary as to not cause the direction of the revolution to be deviated from its original aim. Admittedly, the purges were officially not directed against oppositionists, but against careerists and class enemies. Indeed, the Central Committee circular on the purge went as far as to explicitly ban its potential use to repress "people with other ideas in the party (such as the Worker's Opposition, for example)". While acknowledging this, Fitzpatrick and Rigby nevertheless consider it "difficult to believe that no Oppositionists were among the almost 25% of party members judged unworthy". Still, such use of that first purge must have been limited, since no prominent members of the opposition factions were purged, and they never complained of such a thing, while still being outspoken about other forms of mistreatment. Critics such as the anarchist Murray Bookchin, whilst acknowledging that the ban was "temporary," claim that nothing in Lenin's actions or writings indicate that he would repeal the ban.

Historian Vadim Rogovin stated that the banning of factions was not intended to translate into a ban of inner-party discussions and cited a statement from the Tenth Congress of the RKP which stated "wide discussions on all the most important questions, discussions about them with full freedom of inner-party criticism". Rogovin also cited Lenin's concluding speech on party unity in 1921 which spoke out against a proposed amendment that would have forbidden elections to the Congress according to platforms.
