= All-Union Central Council of Trade Unions =

Central trade union body in the Soviet Union

- Всесоюзный центральный совет профессиональных союзов

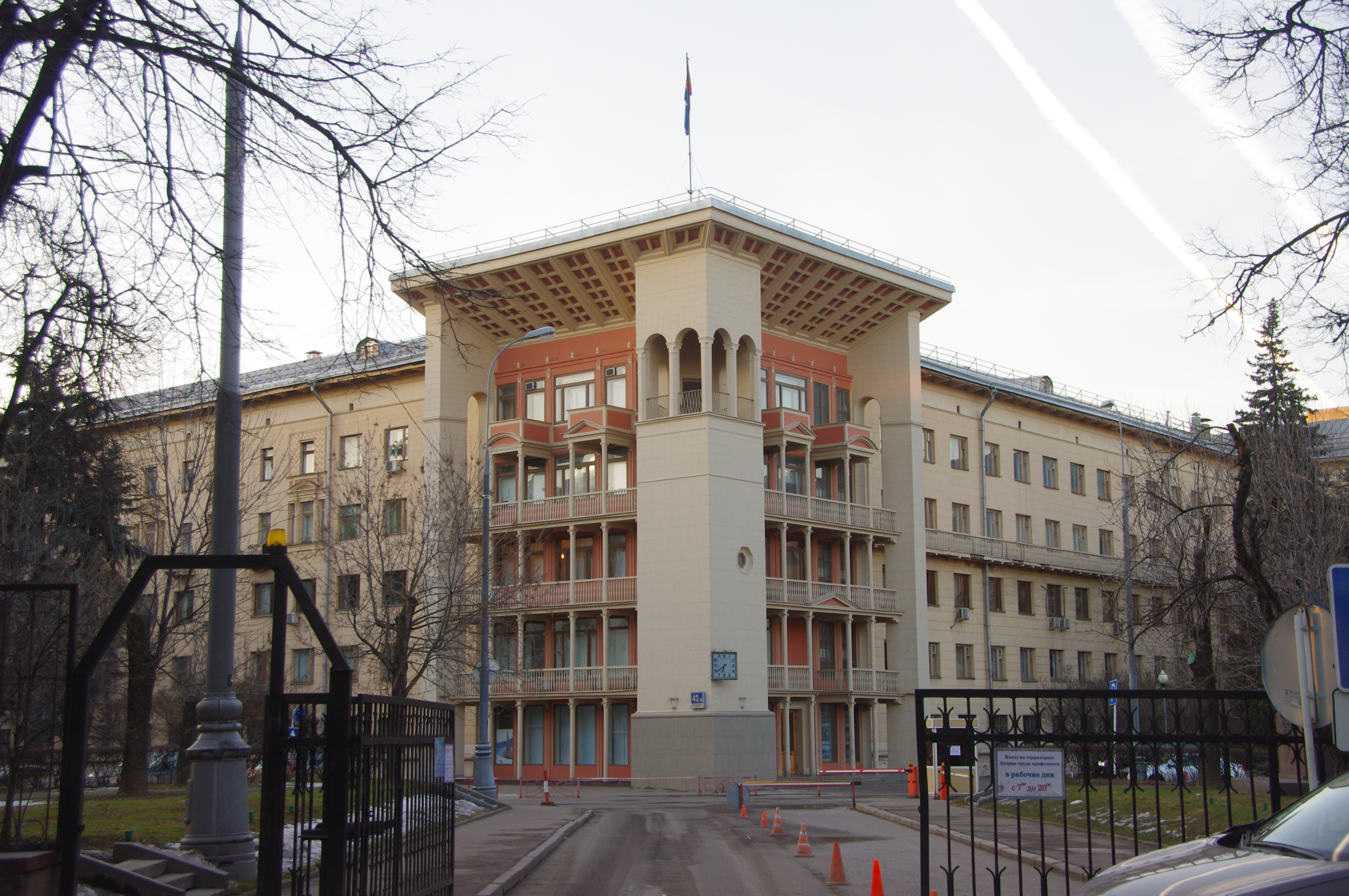
- ACCTU headquarters in Gagarinsky District, Moscow
- Successor: FNPR and GCTU (in Russia)
- Established: September 24, 1918
- Dissolved: October 29, 1990; 36 years ago
- Legal status: Trade union
- Location: Moscow, Soviet Union

The All-Union Central Council of Trade Unions (ACCTU; Russian: Всесоюзный центральный совет профессиональных союзов, VTsSPS) was the national trade union federation of the Soviet Union.

The federation was established in January 1918. In October 1990, it was dissolved, and replaced by the General Confederation of Trade Unions of the USSR.

== History ==
=== Background ===
The First All Russian Conference of Trade Unions took place from September 24 to October 7, 1905, the Second All Russian Conference of Trade Unions took place from February 24 to 28, 1906. On April 16-17, 1917, in Petrograd, at the Third All-Russian Conference of Trade Unions, meeting of representatives of the Petrograd and Moscow Central Bureaus of Trade Unions and the Labor Department of the Petrograd Soviet of Workers' and Soldiers' Deputies, the Organizational Commission for the Convocation of the All-Russian Conference of Trade Unions was formed.

On June 20-28 (July 3-11), 1917, the All-Russian Conference of Trade Unions elected the Provisional All-Russian Central Council of Trade Unions, which retained its powers until the congress. An Executive Committee was elected from the Provisional Council. The Menshevik V. P. Grinevich, who resigned after the October Socialist Revolution in protest against the armed seizure of power by the Bolsheviks, was elected Chairman of the All-Russian Central Council of Trade Unions. In 1918, Fourth All Russian Conference of Trade Unions was held.

=== Formation ===
On 7-14 (20-27 January) 1918, at the First All-Russian Congress of Trade Unions, a permanent governing center of the trade union movement was elected — the All-Russian Central Council of Trade Unions (VTSPS). After the IV Conference (12-17 March 1918), the working apparatus of the Central Council was formed. The Executive Committee was renamed the Presidium of the Central Council, which was formalized by the Charter of the Central Council approved by the Central Council Congress (17-22 September 1922). In connection with the formation of the Union of Soviet Socialist Republics, the VI Congress of Trade Unions (November 11-18, 1924) renamed the Council from the All-Russian to the All-Union Central Council of Trade Unions — a name that was used until the abolition of the All-Union Central Council of Trade Unions in 1990 — and the central committees of the All-Russian trade unions into the Central Committees of the All-Union Trade Unions.

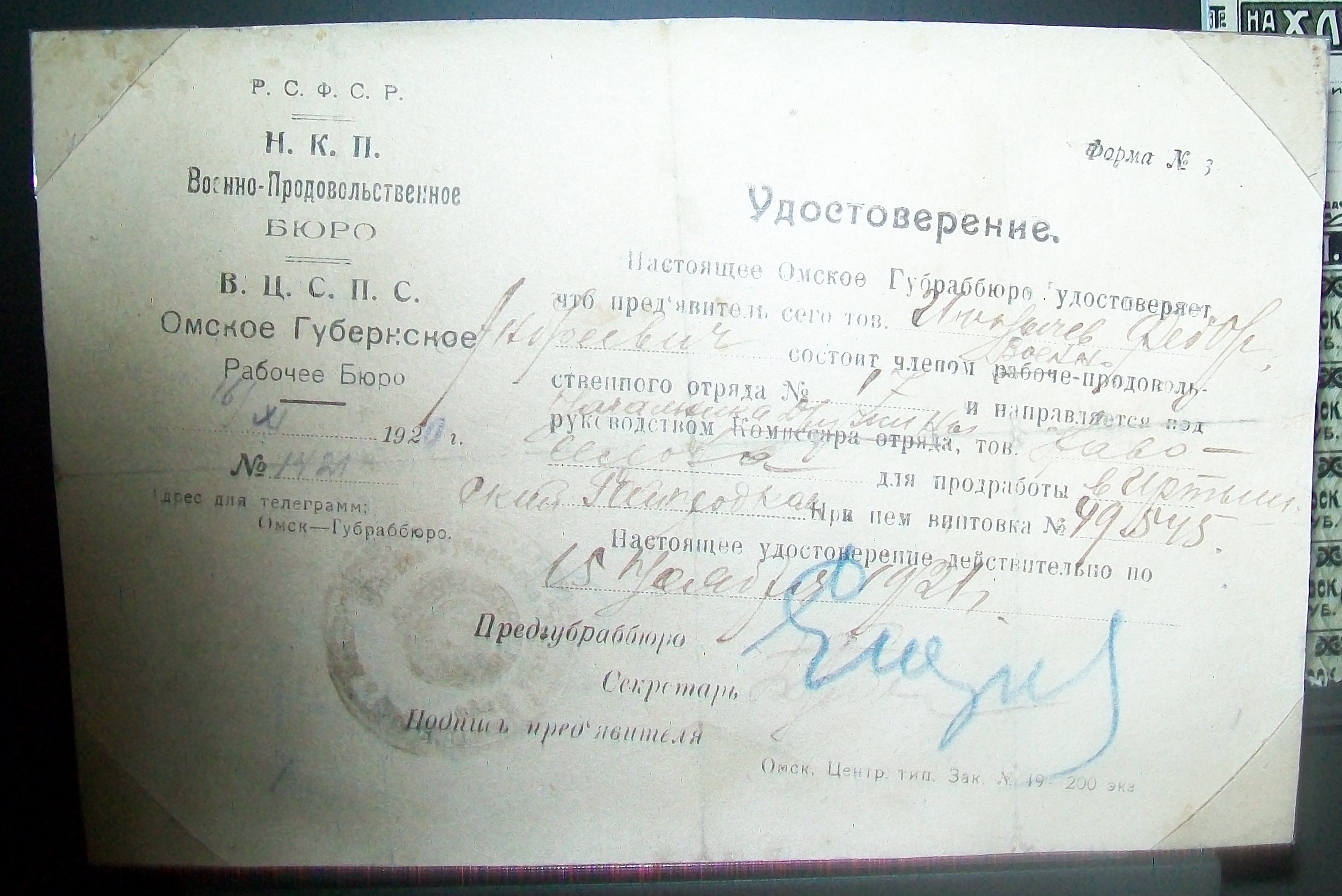
Certificate of a member of a food detachment, issued by the structures of the All-Union Central Council of Trade Unions and the People's Commissariat of Food (November 1920)

Already in 1918, the All-Union Central Council of Trade Unions was effectively subordinate to the Soviet authorities. Trade union structures became assistants to the Soviet authorities in the confiscation of food. The Military Food Bureau of the All-Union Central Council of Trade Unions operated under the People's Commissariat of Food (Narkomprod) of the RSFSR, which, together with it, supervised the workers' food detachments. At the local level, there were provincial and district workers' bureaus of the All-Union Central Council of Trade Unions at the food committees, which were supposed to unite local trade union organizations, form workers' food detachments and manage their activities. A member of a food detachment often received a certificate on behalf of two bodies at the same time - the People's Commissariat of Food and the All-Union Central Council of Trade Unions bureau.

On June 23, 1933, by the Resolution of the Central Executive Committee, the Council of People's Commissars of the USSR and the All-Union Central Council of Trade Unions "On the unification of the People's Commissariat of Labour of the USSR with the All-Union Central Council of Trade Unions", the People's Commissariat of Labour and the All-Union Central Council of Trade Unions were united (including their local bodies). Thus, the All-Union Central Council of Trade Unions formally became a state authority that received supervisory functions in the social and labour sphere.

=== Post-war ===
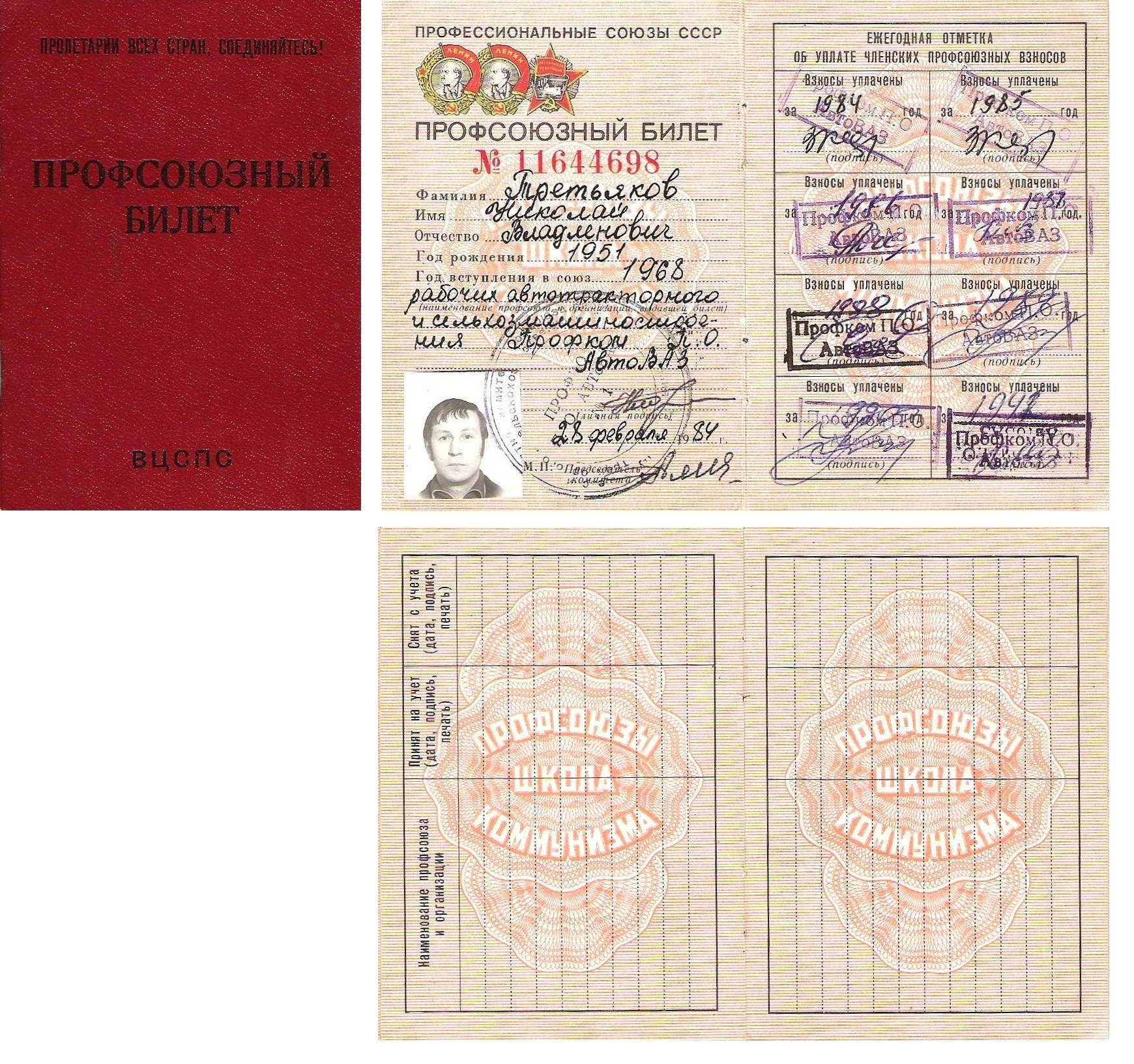
Trade union card of the All-Union Central Council of Trade Unions, 1984

In 1945, the World Trade Union Conference took place in London, United Kingdom, organised alongside the British Trades Union Congress and the U.S. Congress of Industrial Organizations.

After the end of the Great Patriotic War, trade unions were entrusted with organizing the recreation and health improvement of workers, for which purpose on March 10, 1960, by resolution No. 335 of the Council of Ministers of the Soviet Union, sanatoriums and rest homes were transferred to their jurisdiction. Under trade union vouchers, 20% of citizens received free treatment in sanatoriums, 10% received rest in boarding houses, and others paid 20% or 30% of the cost for services, respectively.

The organization of tourist and excursion services also joined this activity: Resolution No. 411 of the Presidium of the All-Union Central Council of Trade Unions of May 30, 1969 "On measures for the further development of tourism and excursions in the country" obliged the councils of ministers of the union republics, the central committees of trade unions, and Komsomol organizations to turn tourism and excursions into a mass service industry for the population. The Central Council for Tourism and Excursions of the All-Union Central Council of Trade Unions was created.

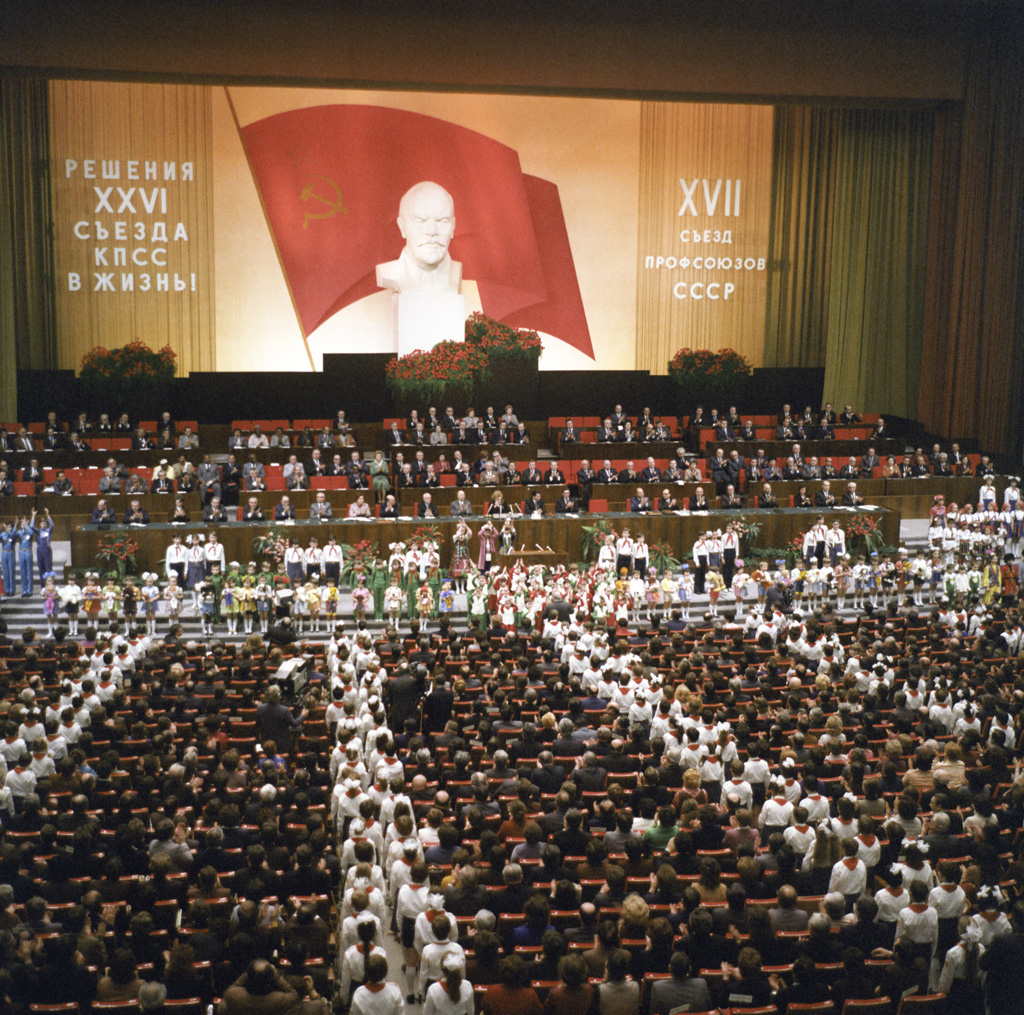
Congress of the All-Union Central Council of Trade Unions at the State Kremlin Palace, 19 March 1982

The next step in expanding the activities of trade unions in the policy of social protection and health care was laid down by the Resolution of the Presidium of the All-Union Central Council of Trade Unions No. 5-1 "On the further development and improvement of the organization of health resort services, tourism and recreation for workers" dated April 26, 1988, which provided for an increase in the number of free health resort vouchers for unemployed war participants and internationalist soldiers by 10 thousand annually in 1989-1991, in order to bring their number to 120 thousand per year, an expansion of the network of health resorts for family recreation, and infrastructure for family autotourism. It was also planned to create 28 centralized diagnostic centers in large resort regions, equipped with modern equipment, paying special attention to follow-up treatment for patients with heart attacks, heart and vascular surgeries, as well as gastric ulcers, duodenal ulcers, and gallbladder resections, using trade union vouchers. In 1987, more than 14 million citizens received treatment and rest in trade union health resorts, and 41 million Soviet people used trade union tourism services, which in total constituted one fifth of the population of the USSR at that time.

=== Dissolution ===
During the Perestroika period, the ideological control of the CPSU was weakened, which made it possible to hold the Founding Congress of the Republican Trade Unions of the RSFSR on March 23, 1990, which proclaimed the rejection of the ideas of Marxism-Leninism and the creation of the Federation of Independent Trade Unions of Russia (FNPR), which united the majority of Russian industry trade unions and territorial trade union associations.

On October 21-29, 1990, the All-Union Central Council of Trade Unions of the USSR was abolished by decision of the XIX Congress of Trade Unions. In its place, the General Confederation of Trade Unions of the USSR was created, with Vladimir Pavlovich Shcherbakov as General Secretary.

After the collapse of the Soviet Union and the ban on the CPSU, the organization was dissolved, its property was transferred to the republican and local trade unions. The Federation of Independent Trade Unions of Russia became its legal successor in Russia.

== Powers and duties ==
- Participated in the development of national economic plans;
- Directed socialist competition and the movement for communist labour;
- Heard reports of committees and councils of trade unions, as well as reports of ministries, departments and state committees on production, labor and cultural and everyday services for workers and employees;
- Endowed with the right of legislative initiative, that is, it could submit draft laws and decrees to legislative bodies;
- Participated in the preparation and consideration in the Council of Ministers of draft resolutions on wages, social insurance, labour protection, cultural and everyday services for workers and monitored compliance with laws and regulations on these issues;
- Issued instructions, rules and explanations on the application of current labour legislation;
- Managed the state social insurance and health resort services for workers;
- Led the All-Union Society of Inventors and Innovators, scientific and technical societies, voluntary sports societies of trade unions, and the development of tourism;
- Created trade union schools and courses;
- Approved the trade union budget and the state social insurance budget;
- Represented Soviet trade unions in the international trade union movement and, on their behalf, entered into international trade union associations.

== Affiliates ==
Union	Founded	Left	Reason left
Agricultural and Procurement Workers' Union	1899		
Automobile Transport Workers' Union		1957	Merged
Aviation and Defence Industry Workers' Union	1957	1977	Split
Aviation Industry Workers' Union		1957	Merged
Aviation Industry Workers' Union	1977		
Aviation Workers' Union			
Building and Building Materials Workers' Union	1957		
Building Materials Industry Workers' Union		1957	Merged
Chemical Industry Workers' Union		1957	Merged
Coal Mining Industry Workers' Union			
Communication, Automobile Transport and Highway Workers' Union	1957		
Communications Workers' Union		1957	Merged
Construction Workers' Union	1946	1957	Merged
Consumer Co-operatives Workers' Union		1957	Merged
Consumer Goods Industry Workers' Union		1957	Merged
Cultural Workers' Union			
Defence Industry Workers' Union		1957	Merged
Defence Industry Workers' Union	1977		
Education, Higher Schools and Scientific Institutions Workers' Union	1957		
Engineering Workers' Union			
Food Products Industry Workers' Union			
Geological Survey Workers' Union			
Higher Schools and Scientific Institutions Workers' Union		1957	Merged
Highway and Hydraulic Engineering Workers' Union	1934	1955	Merged
Local Industry and Municipal Services Workers' Union	1957		
Local Industry Workers' Union		1957	Merged
Machine Building Industry Workers' Union		1957	Merged
Medical Workers' Union			
Metallurgical Industry Workers' Union	1957		
Municipal Services Workers' Union		1957	Merged
Oil and Chemical Industry Workers' Union	1957		
Oil Industry Workers' Union		1957	Merged
Power Stations and Electrical Industry Workers' Union			
Railway Transport Workers' Union			
Sea and River Workers' Union			
State Institutions Workers' Union			
State Trade and Consumer Co-operative Societies Workers' Union	1957		
State Trade and Public Catering Enterprise Workers' Union		1957	Merged
Textile and Light Industry Workers' Union	1948	1990	Federation dissolved
Timber and Rafting Workers' Union	1948	1953	Merged
Timber, Paper and Woodworkers' Union	1953		
Transport and Heavy Machine Building Workers' Union		1957	Merged
Urban and Rural Construction Workers' Union	1946	1956	Merged
Woodworkers' Union	1948	1953	Merged

== Chairmen ==
- Grigory Zinoviev (1918)
- Mikhail Tomsky (1918—1929)
- Alexander Dogadov (1929—1930)
- Nikolai Shvernik (1930—1944)
- Vasili Kuznetsov (1944—1953)
- Nikolai Shvernik (1953—1956)
- Viktor Grishin (1956—1967)
- Alexander Shelepin (1967—1975)
- Alexei Shibaev (1976-1982)
- Stepan Shalayev (1982-1990)
- Gennady Yanayev (17 April — 20 July 1990)
