= Gavril Myasnikov =

Russian revolutionary

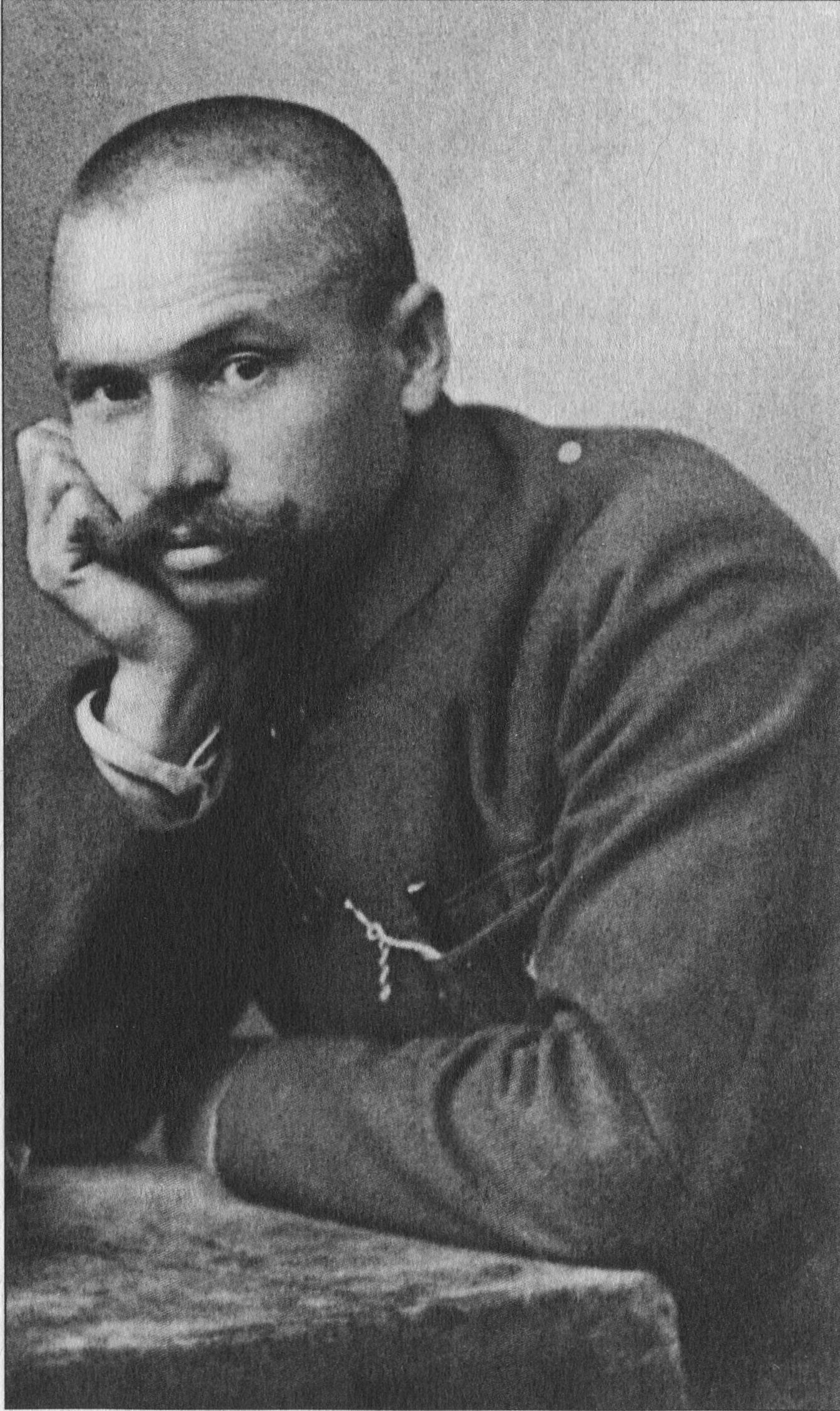
- Myasnikov in 1922
- Born: Gavril Ilyich Myasnikov; 25 February 1889; Chistopol, Russia
- Died: 16 November 1945 (aged 56)
- Political party: SR (1905); RSDLP (1906-1912; Bolshevik faction); RCP(b) (1912-1922); Workers' Group (1923-1930)
- Spouse: Daria Grigorievna Myasnikova (m. 1920)

Gavril Ilyich Myasnikov (Note: Russian: Гавриил Ильич Мясников) (February 25, 1889 – November 16, 1945), also transliterated as Gavriil Il'ich Miasnikov, was a Russian communist revolutionary, a metalworker from the Urals, and one of the first Communists to oppose and criticise the Bolshevik government.

== Life ==
=== Early life ===
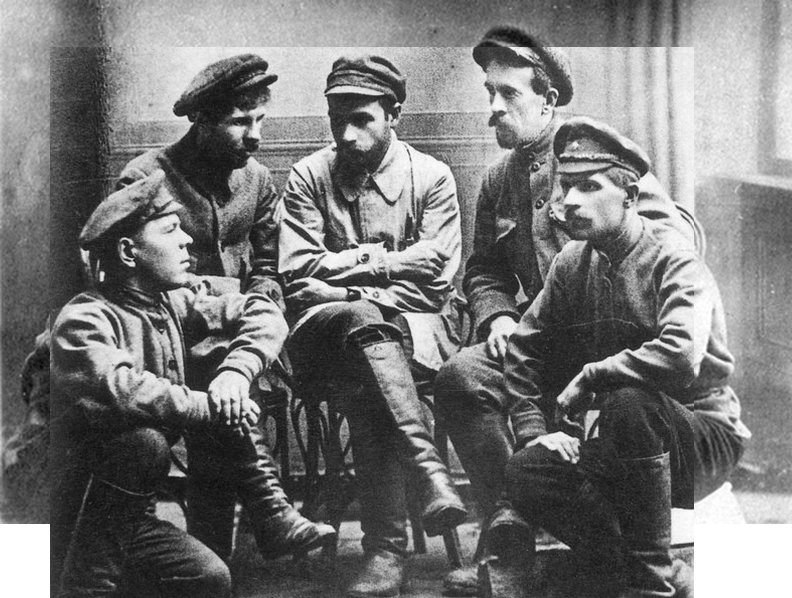
A. V. Markov, Ivan Kolpaschtschikov, Gavril Ilyich Myasnikov (middle), V. A. Ivantschenko and N. V. Schuschgov.

Myasnikov was born on 25 February 1889, to a large, working-class family from Chistopol, Russia. Little is known of his childhood, other than that he left school at age 11, and began apprenticing as a mechanic at the Motovilikha arms plant in the city of Perm.

=== Revolutionary activity ===
Myasnikov joined the Socialist Revolutionary Party in May of 1905 amid the 1905 Revolution, leading a combat unit involved in the expropriation of weapons. He left the party in September, before joining the Bolshevik faction of the RSDLP the following year. Following an arrest that same year, he was exiled to Eastern Siberia, but escaped in June 1908. He was arrested again in 1909 and 1911, but escaped each time. Arrested for the fourth time, in Baku in 1913, he spent four years in Oryol Prison. During his time in prison, Myasnikov regularly went on hunger strike, and often received beatings for talking back to guards. He was released during the February Revolution and returned to Motovilikha, where he was elected chairman of the local soviet of workers' and peasant's deputies.

Myasnikov supervised the execution of Grand Duke Michael Alexandrovich of Russia, younger brother of the deposed Tsar Nicholas II (1918). As the representative of the Perm Soviet, he attended a special session of the Ural Soviet on 29 June 1918 under the chairmanship of his close comrade Alexander Beloborodov, where it was unanimously decided by those present that the former Tsar and his family be shot. When Myasnikov left Yekaterinburg ahead of the advance of the White Army, he took with him Beloborodov's wife and children at Beloborodov's request, as he feared for the safety of his own family as the Whites advanced on the city. Despite these efforts, Beloborodov ultimately lost his family a week later when his wife and three children drowned when a crowded ferry they had boarded to cross the River Vychegda capsized. Beloborodov himself would not learn of this until after he returned to Moscow.

=== In opposition ===
Myasnikov was a Left Communist in 1918, opposed to the Treaty of Brest-Litovsk. Towards the end of the civil war, he emerged as one of the most outspoken critics of the communist state, and the only prominent Bolshevik to be expelled from the party and arrested during the lifetime of Vladimir Lenin. He called for freedom of the press to be restored for everyone "from monarchists to anarchists inclusive", which the Central Committee condemned as "incompatible with the interests of the party." He also suggested that:

The Soviet power must maintain at its own expense a body of detractors as did once the Roman Empire.

In 1920, he also called for the formation of peasant unions to heal the breach between the urban and rural workers - making him apparently the only prominent figure in the communist party to be concerned that early about the living conditions of the rural poor. The same year, Myasnikov married his wife, Daria. Together they had a son, Yuri, the following year. In May 1921, he wrote an article calling for peasants and workers to have freedom of expression. Lenin reacted by ordering the Perm provincial committee to discipline Myasnikov. This led to his exclusion from an upcoming conference at the Motovilikha factory.

Lenin wrote to Myasnikov in August 1921, to say that "We do not believe in 'absolutes'. We laugh at 'pure democracy' .... Freedom of the press in the R.S.F.S.R., which is surrounded by the bourgeois enemies of the whole world, means freedom of political organisation for the bourgeoisie and its most loyal servants, the Mensheviks and Socialist Revolutionaries. The bourgeoisie (all over the world) is still very much stronger than we are. To place in its hands yet another weapon ... means facilitating the enemy’s task." Myasnikov replied that the only reason he, Myasnikov, was not in prison was that he was an old Bolshevik, while thousands of ordinary workers were in prison for saying the same things as he had.

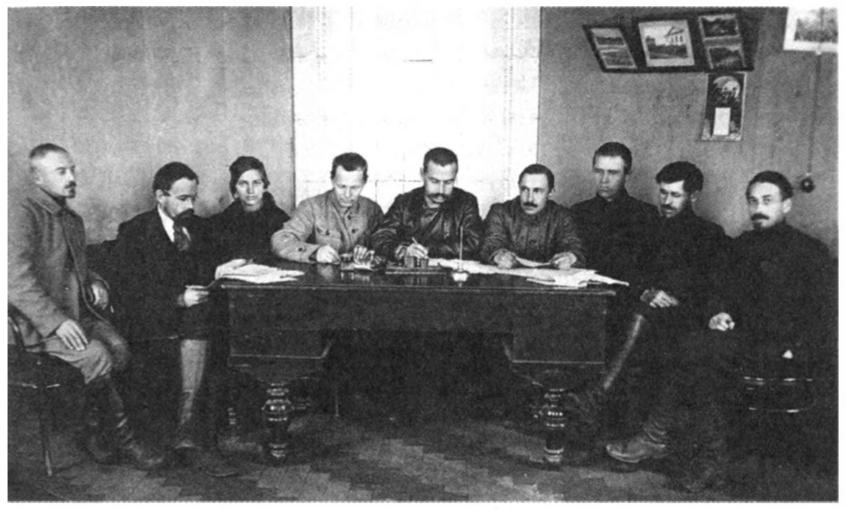
Myasnikov (centre) in the Perm Provincial Committee of the RCP(B), 1920

Even after his views had been condemned by the Central Committee, Myasnikov succeeded in getting them adopted by the party organisation in Motovilikha, where he formed a group called “Workers Group of the Russian Communist Party”. He was expelled from the party on 22 February 1922.

Myasnikov had never belonged to the Workers' Opposition, which in 1920–21, called for the management of the economy to be turned over to the trade unions. Myasnikov disagreed with the Workers' Opposition's call for unions to manage the economy. Instead, in a 1921 manifesto, Myasnikov argued that "those comrades who think there is nothing outside of the trade unions are mistaken, because there are institutions that are strictly united with each factory, each department, each workshop: these institutions are the soviets" and called for “producers’ soviets” to administer industry and for freedom of the press for all workers. Leaders of the Workers Opposition Alexander Shlyapnikov and Sergei Medvedev feared that Myasnikov's proposals would give too much power to peasants. But, by 1922, the two groups made common cause against the absence of free debate within the communist party. Shlyapnikov, Medvedev and Myasnikov were all signatories of the "Letter of the Twenty-Two" to the Comintern in 1922, protesting the Russian Communist Party leaders' suppression of dissent among proletarian members of the Communist Party.

Myasnikov was arrested by the OGPU in May 1923, but then released him and sent on a trade mission in Germany. There he formed ties to the Communist Workers' Party of Germany, a group at odds with the Russian Communist Party. These groups helped him publish the Manifesto of the Workers Group, without permission from the Russian Communist Party. Workers' Group was suppressed and later in 1923 Myasnikov was persuaded to return to Russia, where he was arrested and imprisoned.

In 1927, his sentence was changed to internal exile in Yerevan, Armenia. In November 1928, he fled the USSR for Iran. He was arrested in Iran and then deported to Turkey. In 1930, he immigrated to France, where he worked in factories until 1944. In exile, he wrote a long essay denouncing the communist system in the Soviet Union as 'state capitalism', and calling for it to be destroyed and replaced by a workers' democracy.

In 1941, Myasnikov was arrested by Gestapo after visiting the Soviet Embassy in Paris. In 1942, he escaped to Toulouse in the unoccupied zone, but was captured by the French police and sent to Camp du Récébédou. He was assigned by the Organisation Todt as a forced labourer to work on the Atlantic Wall defense system. He returned to Paris after being released in July 1943.

== Death ==
In November 1944, he was invited by the Soviet embassy in France to return to the USSR. He accepted the invitation, received a visa and was sent to the USSR via the embassy on 18 December 1944. He left in January 1945, on the same aircraft as the spy Alexander Foote. Despite the promise of amnesty, he was arrested by the Soviet secret police on 17 January 1945, and executed on 16 November 1945.

On 25 December 2001, Myasnikov was rehabilitated.

== Bibliography ==
- Avrich, Paul (1984). Bolshevik Opposition to Lenin: G. T. Miasnikov and the Workers' Group. The Russian Review.
- Miasnikov, G. "Filosofiia ubiistva, ili pochemu i kak ia ubil Mikhaila Romanova." Minuvshee, 18 (1995): 7–191.
- Alikina, Nadezhda Alekseevna. Don Kikhot proletarskoi revoliutsii. Perm: Izdatel'stvo Pushka, 2006.
- "Le Groupe ouvrier du Parti communiste russe (1922 - 1937) / Gavril Miasnikov, edite par Michel Olivier (2009): Contribution à l'histoire de la Gauche communiste". SMOLNY.....Collectif d’édition des introuvables du mouvement ouvrier. Archived from the original on April 19, 2013.
