= Left Communists (Soviet Russia) =

Faction of the Russian Communist Party (Bolsheviks)

Left Communists левые коммунисты
- Leader: Nikolai Bukharin
- Founded: c. December 1917
- Dissolved: c. late 1918
- Succeeded by: Workers' Opposition; Military Opposition
- Ideology: Marxism; Communism
- Political position: Far-left
- National affiliation: Russian Communist Party

The Left Communists (Russian: левые коммунисты, levyye kommunisty) or Left Bolsheviks (левые большевики, levyye bolsheviki) were a faction of the Russian Communist Party (Bolsheviks) who were at their most prominent in December 1917 and early 1918, during the debates on signing a separate peace with the Central Powers of World War I. The Left Communist faction opposed a peace on the terms of the Treaty of Brest-Litovsk, a view shared with the Left Socialist Revolutionaries who were a separate political party with whom the Bolsheviks shared power in the early Soviet government. The Left Communist faction instead advocated a "revolutionary war" to foment revolution in Germany and across Europe. The faction also held radical left-wing positions on economic and social policies, including support for more workers' control and a more democratic military, and supported internationalism to the point of rejecting the idea of national self-determination, particularly in the form of an independent Poland. The faction was led by Nikolai Bukharin, and included Andrei Bubnov, Alexandra Kollontai, Valerian Obolensky, Georgy Pyatakov, Yevgeni Preobrazhensky, Karl Radek, Vladimir Smirnov and Varvara Yakovleva. Their support was strong in the party's Moscow bureau and in Petrograd.

In their theoretical journal Kommunist, is an early critique of state capitalism and bureaucratic centralism, arguing that Lenin's reliance on bourgeois specialists and one-man management in factories would alienate the working class and undermine genuine socialist transformation.

At the Seventh Party Congress (6–8 March 1918), which had been packed with supporters of the peace by Vladimir Lenin and Yakov Sverdlov, the Left Communists abstained from the vote calling for ratification of the Treaty of Brest-Litovsk (3 March 1918). They abandoned their advocacy of "revolutionary war", but in their journal Kommunist (published in four issues in Moscow in April–June 1918) criticized the "pragmatism" and "conservatism" of Lenin and his allies, urging immediate nationalization of industry, workers' control, and no compromise with capitalist forces, domestic or foreign. Left Communists were dominant in Vesenkha for four months, from December 1917 to April 1918, with Osinsky as the head of Vesenkha for three months, followed by Yakovleva as head for one month. Left Communists were then replaced by moderates such as Alexei Rykov, Vladimir Milyutin, and Yuri Larin, in the period from April 1918 up to 1921.

The Left Communist faction largely died out by the end of 1918, as its leaders accepted that their program was unrealistic in the circumstances of the deepening Russian Civil War and as the policies of war communism satisfied their demands for a radical transformation of the economy. The Military Opposition and the Workers' Opposition inherited some characteristics and members of the Left Communists, and the tendency re-emerged in Gavril Myasnikov's Workers Group during the debates on the New Economic Policy (NEP) and the succession to Lenin. Although Bukharin drifted rightwards inside the Bolshevik Party from 1921 onwards by becoming a strong supporter of the NEP, and later as the leader of the Right Tendency, most Left Communists became affiliated with Leon Trotsky's Left Opposition in the mid 1920s and were later expelled from the party at the 15th Party Congress (2–19 December 1927). Most Old Bolsheviks were later killed in Joseph Stalin's Great Purge.

== See also ==
- Zimmerwald Left
- Left Opposition
