= Letter of the Twenty Two =

1922 Open letter to Russian party leaders

The Letter of the Twenty Two was a letter written by twenty two working class members of the Russian Communist Party (Bolshevik) expressing their concerns about the rift which they perceived between workers and party leaders. It was addressed to the Executive Committee of the Communist International and sent on February 26, 1922. The original twenty two signatories were all metalworkers. However Alexandra Kollontai and Zoya Shadurskaia, both prominent Bolshevik women of noble background, subsequently signed the letter.

== Signatories ==
The signatories of the letter were as follows:

- Mikhail Ivanovich Lobanov (1889–1929)
- Nikolai Vladimirovich Kuznetsov (1884–1937)
- A. Polosatov
- Aleksandr Nikolaevich Medvedev (1892–1944)
- Gavril Myasnikov
- V. Pleshkov
- G. Shokhanov
- Sergei Pavlovich Medvedev
- Genrikh Ivanovich Bruno (1889–1937) (party member since 1906)
- Aleksandr (Iosif) Grigorevich Pravdin (1879–1938) (1899)
- I. Ivanov (1899)
- Flor Anisimovich Mitin (1882–1937) (1902)
- Pavel Semenovich Borisov (1892–1939) (1913)
- M. Kopylov (1912)
- Zhilin (1915)
- Mikhail Ivanovich Chelyshev (1888–1937) (1910)
- Aleksandr Fedorovich Tolokontsev (1889–1937) (1914)
- Alexander Gavrilovich Shliapnikov (1883–1954) (1901)
- I. Barulin (1917)
- V. Belcrenev (1907-9/1917)
- A. Pavlov (1917)
- A. M. Tashkin (1892–1942) (1917)

== See also ==
- Conference of the Twenty Two, the founding Bolshevik conference held near Geneva, Switzerland in 1904
