= Workers' Opposition =

1920–1921 faction of the Russian Communist Party

- Leader: Alexander Shliapnikov
- Spokesperson: Alexandra Kollontai
- Founded: February 1920
- Dissolved: March 1921
- Preceded by: Left Communists
- Succeeded by: Workers' Group
- Ideology: Left communism
- Political position: Far-left
- National affiliation: Russian Communist Party
- Trade union affiliation: Various trade unions

The Workers' Opposition (Russian: Рабочая оппозиция, romanized: Rabochaya oppozitsiya) was a faction of the Russian Communist Party that emerged in 1920 as a response to the perceived over-bureaucratisation that was occurring in Soviet Russia. They advocated for the transfer of national economic management to trade unions. The group was led by Alexander Shlyapnikov, Sergei Medvedev, Alexandra Kollontai and Yuri Lutovinov. It officially existed until March 1921 when it was forced to dissolve by the 10th Congress of the Russian Communist Party (Bolsheviks), and semi-clandestinely until the subsequent 11th Congress in 1922, where its main exponents teetered dangerously on the verge of being purged for fractionist activity. In some aspects, it was close with the German council communist movement, although there is no information about direct contacts between these groups.

== History ==
=== Emergence ===
The emergence of the Workers' Opposition's “ideological sources” was linked with a statement by Alexander Shlyapnikov, which appeared on November 4, 1917: in his statement, Shlyapnikov proposed expanding the Council of People's Commissars by including representatives “from all Soviet parties”. Their first public appearance as an organized group was at the 9th Congress of the Russian Communist Party (Bolsheviks), in September 1920, when the faction not only declared its existence, but also summed up the “work to be done”.

=== First appearances ===
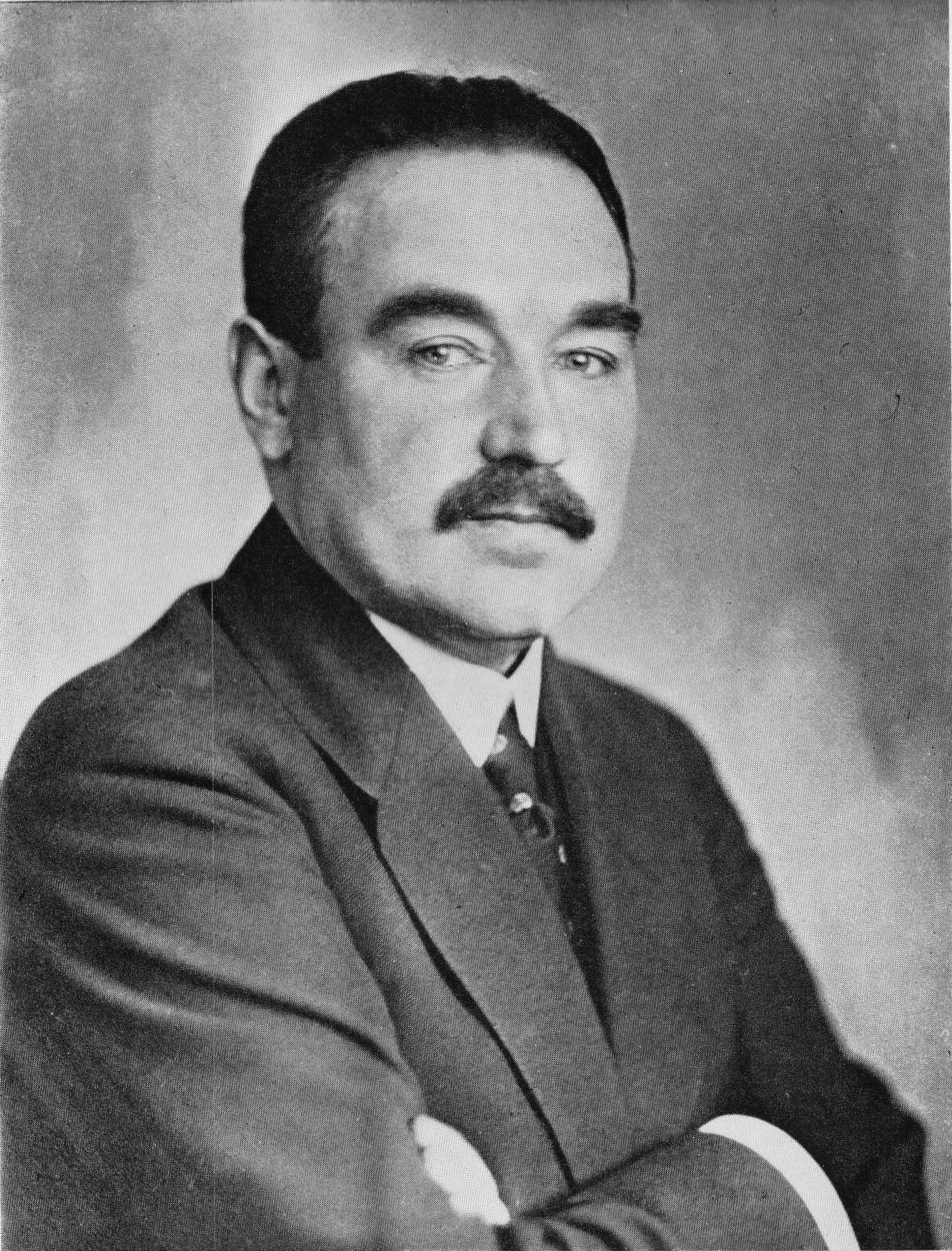
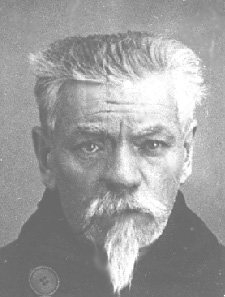
Alexander Shlyapnikov and Sergei Medvedev, leaders of the Workers' Opposition.

One of the first speeches of representatives of the "workers' opposition" — the name was coined by Lenin — took place in February 1920, during the 2nd Tula Conference of the RCP(b), after which the group managed to get a majority of seats in the provincial committee of the party, and its leader - I. V. Kopylov - became the chairman of the new composition of the provincial committee. In response to this, the former members of the provincial committee formed the opposition, directing their activities to prove the inability the "workers' opposition" to manage the affairs of the province; in addition, they began to plan the failure of their political opponents at the next provincial party conference. This confrontation led to an intensification of the struggle within the organization itself: the party's Novosilsky District committee opposed the election of Kopylov and called for an extraordinary conference. The demand of the old guard was supported in Moscow by members of the party's central committee, who recalled Kopylov at their disposal. The conflict did not end there, because in response, the Zarechensky district committee issued a resolution requesting "to leave Kopylov to work in Tula." The Central Committee nevertheless decided to convene an extraordinary party conference in the province: a resolution evaluating the work as unsatisfactory was adopted by a majority of 185 votes against 49. In response, representatives of the “workers' opposition” Severny and Nikitin left the district committee because of their disagreement with the party line. Having been defeated in Tula, Kopylov's supporters nevertheless retained their positions in the Zarechensky district organization and the power struggle continued. At that time, support for the workers' opposition in the lower ranks of the party was quite strong: in particular, the number of Tula party organizations was halved between May and November 1920, mainly due to the exit of the local workers.

From the end of 1919 to the beginning of 1920, the workers' opposition matured along the periphery of Moscow Oblast and, by March 1920, took shape in the capital with many trade union leaders joining the group. In the same month, at a meeting of the communist faction of the All-Union Central Council of Trade Unions, Shlyapnikov proposed a formula for the separation of powers in the USSR: his simple scheme consisted in the separation of functions of trade unions, Soviets, and the Bolshevik party. According to the leader of the opposition, the party could be the responsible political state leader of the revolutionary struggle and construction, the Soviets - the form of political power, and the trade unions - the only responsible organizations of the national economy and, at the same time, the school of industrial management for workers.

Shlyapnikov's theses caused great concern within the Central Committee of the RCP (b), which saw in them the manifestation of tendencies toward syndicalism in the Soviet trade unions - that is, an attempt on the leading role of the party in the economic sphere. On March 8 and 10, 1920, at meetings of the VTsSPS and MGPSS factions, representatives of the Central Committee Nikolai Bukharin and Nikolay Krestinsky sharply criticized Shlyapnikov's ideas, accusing him of “syndicalism, guild narrowness, distrust of the Soviets and the party.” In response to such accusations, Lozovsky, who attended the meetings, noted that syndicalists denied the state itself, and Shlyapnikov had a different point of view: the opposition leader did not deny the state and did not encroach on state property; he talked only about the responsibility of trade unions for the economy and the main role of unions in Soviet industry.

In September 1920, at the 9th Congress of the Russian Communist Party (Bolsheviks), there was a new flash of activity of supporters of the workers' opposition, which was associated with a discussion about the upper and lower classes of the party. Yuri Lutovinov formulated a number of provisions that later became part of the group's opposition program: in his speech he “fervently insisted on the immediate implementation of the broadest possible labor democracy, on the complete abolition of appointment, and on the strictest cleansing of the party.” The Bolshevik conference did not support this proposal: moreover, at the meeting it was decided to create a control commission, whose task was to prevent the factional struggle in the party. Despite such measures, the speeches of the supporters of the workers' opposition became more frequent throughout the country, and its contradictions with the course of the Central Committee intensified both in the regions and in the center. In particular, in November 1920, the Organizing Bureau of the Central Committee of the RCP (B.) was forced to pay special attention to the conflict in the Tula Provincial Committee of the RCP (B.), which flared up with renewed vigor: to clarify the circumstances, the central committee sent a special commission to the province. At the same time, in Moscow itself, the internal party struggle took on a fierce character. In the fall of 1920, playing on the problem of the upper and lower classes, the workers' opposition were able to attract the sympathy of many Bolsheviks to their program and form tangible support for their ideas among the party workers. As a result, at the end of November, at the gubernatorial conference, the opposition bloc was able to collect almost half of the delegates' votes: 124 against 154 people. As indicated in the Central Committee's report, "the opposition itself was extremely hostile to the common party line": subsequently, Lenin noted that it came to the point that "the conference ended in two rooms".

=== Trade-union debate ===
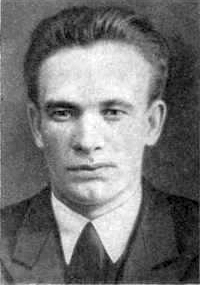
Yury Lutovinov, secretary of the VTsSPS, a key founding member of the Workers’ Opposition

==== Start of the debate ====
The "trade-union debate" marked the rise of the "workers' opposition." Relying on the provisions contained in the party program adopted at the 8th Congress of the Russian Communist Party (Bolsheviks) in 1919 - primarily on the part that “trade unions should come to the total concentration of control over the entire national economy" - Shlyapnikov criticized the central committee with his like-minded comrades for “militaristic methods” of working with trade unions, specifically because during the Russian Civil War, unions were massively deprived of independence and absorbed by the government of the RSFSR.

According to Aleksei Semyonovich Kiselyov, serious disagreements with the party leadership among the trade union leaders emerged at the beginning of 1920: he saw them as the main reason for the transition to a policy of militarization of labor. At that time, the majority of trade unions believed that the prospect of the end of active hostilities required, if not a change in policy guidelines, then at least a shift in emphasis in the organization of labor - a transition to economic incentives. In particular, they advocated the improvement of the food situation of the proletariat and the development of "amateur activity" of workers within the framework of trade union organizations. Moreover, the party leadership proceeded from the assumption that in the prevailing conditions at the time of the end of the long war, reliance on conventional methods of industrial management would not be able to prevent the final collapse of the Soviet economy: they believed that emergency measures, including military ones, were necessary.

==== Positions of the parties ====
Questions about trade unions became key at meetings of the All-Union Central Council of Trade Unions on March 8, 10 and 15, 1920. According to Kiselyov, by that time in the leading circles of trade union leaders, three political groups could be identified. The first could be attributed to David Riazanov and Mikhail Tomsky, who believed that trade unions should withdraw from economic affairs and deal primarily with the organization of labor. The second group included those workers who advocated the “merging” of trade unions with the state apparatus. And the third group consisted of Shlyapnikov's supporters, who believed that trade unions should become the sole responsible organizations in the field of the national economy of the RSFSR. Thus, already in the spring of 1920, a heated discussion about trade unions began in Soviet Russia: it became open only in late 1920 - early 1921. At that time, a five-member “trade union commission” was created for the central committees, the tasks of which included both studying and verifying the practical experience of the trade unions, and developing abstracts that would express the Central Committee's point of view on this issue. However, Alexander Shlyapnikov, Yury Lutovinov and Leon Trotsky, initially included in this commission, refused to participate in it - which only aggravated the differences. Under these conditions, on December 24, the Plenum of the Central Committee decided to open a broad discussion on the question of trade unions.

On December 30, 1920, leaders of intra-party groups spoke at an expanded meeting of the communist faction of the 8th All-Russian Congress of Soviets and All-Union Central Council of Trade Unions, where they outlined their political platforms. The controversy unfolding at the meeting was accompanied by mutual accusations and almost immediately "acquired a bad character." From the beginning of January of the following year, party organizations joined in the discussion of issues: in particular, on January 3, at a meeting of the party's active in Petrograd, an “Appeal to the Party” was adopted, expressing full support for the Lenin-Zinoviev group, and Trotsky was accused of trying to split the party and professional movement, "in the desire to eliminate unions". At the same time, the resolution proposed to send representatives to the 10th Congress of the Russian Communist Party (Bolsheviks) in proportion to the number of votes cast in support of each group. In addition, a desire was expressed to send agitators to the province who were obliged to provide propaganda and organizational assistance to local supporters of the Leninist group.

==== Support for the “Workers' Opposition” Platform ====
Almost from the very beginning, the discussion on trade unions went beyond the usual discussion of the theses of various fractions - and "turned into a kind of formal revealing of party opinion." The question of the future of trade unions was brought up for discussion in district committees and district meetings of the Bolsheviks: usually, after reports of representatives of various platforms, voting was held at meetings. On the whole, the majority of Soviet communists supported the Leninist position; in particular, on January 17, 1921, eight platforms were put to a vote at a meeting of the party's Moscow committee: 76 people voted for Lenin's wording, 27 for Trotsky's ideas, 4 for the theses of the “workers' opposition”, 11 for the Group of Democratic Centralism (who wanted more Soviet autonomy), 25 for the group of Ignatians, and the remaining platforms received less than two votes. On January 25, in the Tula party organization - where Trotsky, Zinoviev and Shlyapnikov acted as rapporteurs - 582 people voted for Lenin-Zinoviev's resolution, 272 for Trotsky's and 16 delegates for Shlyapnikov's. The Petrograd party organization also supported the Leninist "Platform 10" and it gradually became apparent that the struggle in the capital was waged between the groups of Lenin—Zinoviev and Trotsky.

A more "motley" picture was observed at the county and district meetings: on January 27, in the second Zamoskvoretsky district, 59 votes were cast for "platform 10", 10 for the theses of the "workers' opposition", and seven people supported the Trotskyists; in another district of Moscow - Baumansky - in the central area, 43 people voted for Lenin's thesis, 7 for the "workers' opposition", and 4 people for Trotsky's principles. The trade unions themselves did not go around the discussion: in particular, at the congress of miners in Moscow, the platform of the "workers' opposition" gathered 61 votes in support, the "platform 10" - 137, and only eight people supported Trotsky's theses.

At the Moscow Provincial Party Conference, held on February 19, 1921, and attended by more than three hundred delegates, there was a scandal: E. N. Ignatov declared support for the platform of the “workers' opposition”, which “caused great concern” among the conference members, since until the last day Ignatov's group supported “platform 10”. The subsequent vote ended with the following result: “platform 10” received 217 votes, Trotsky's theses - 52, the platform of “workers' opposition” - 45, and the principles of “democratic centralism” - 13 votes. In the central committee of metalworkers, the “workers' opposition” generally took first place: they were given eleven out of twenty votes.

==== 10th Congress ====
At the final stage of the "trade-union debate" of the Soviet Communists, to a large extent, the fate of the trade unions was no longer a cause for concern - the question of which fraction would win the upcoming 10th Congress of the Russian Communist Party (Bolsheviks) became more important. As a result, the struggle of the factions escalated into a battle for leadership in the party - which significantly affected the course of the discussion. In the event, the congress passed a secret resolution "On Party Unity" which banned factions within the party and ordered the immediate dissolution of the groups that had been previously formed. The resolution put an end to the aspirations of the Workers' Opposition and the Democratic Centralists.

Another secret resolution specially aimed at the Workers' Opposition was also passed condemning 'the syndicalist and anarchist deviation in our party', which "made further advocacy of the basic tenets of the Workers' Opposition's programme impossible". Yet the Congress shared some of its peripheral proposals, including conducting a purge of the Party and organizing better supply of workers, to improve workers' living conditions, and three of its leaders were elected to the Party Central Committee: Shlyapnikov as a full voting member, Medvedev and Kiselyov as candidate members. Nevertheless, Party leaders subsequently undertook a campaign to subordinate trade unions to the Party and to harass and intimidate those who opposed this campaign.

=== End of the movement ===
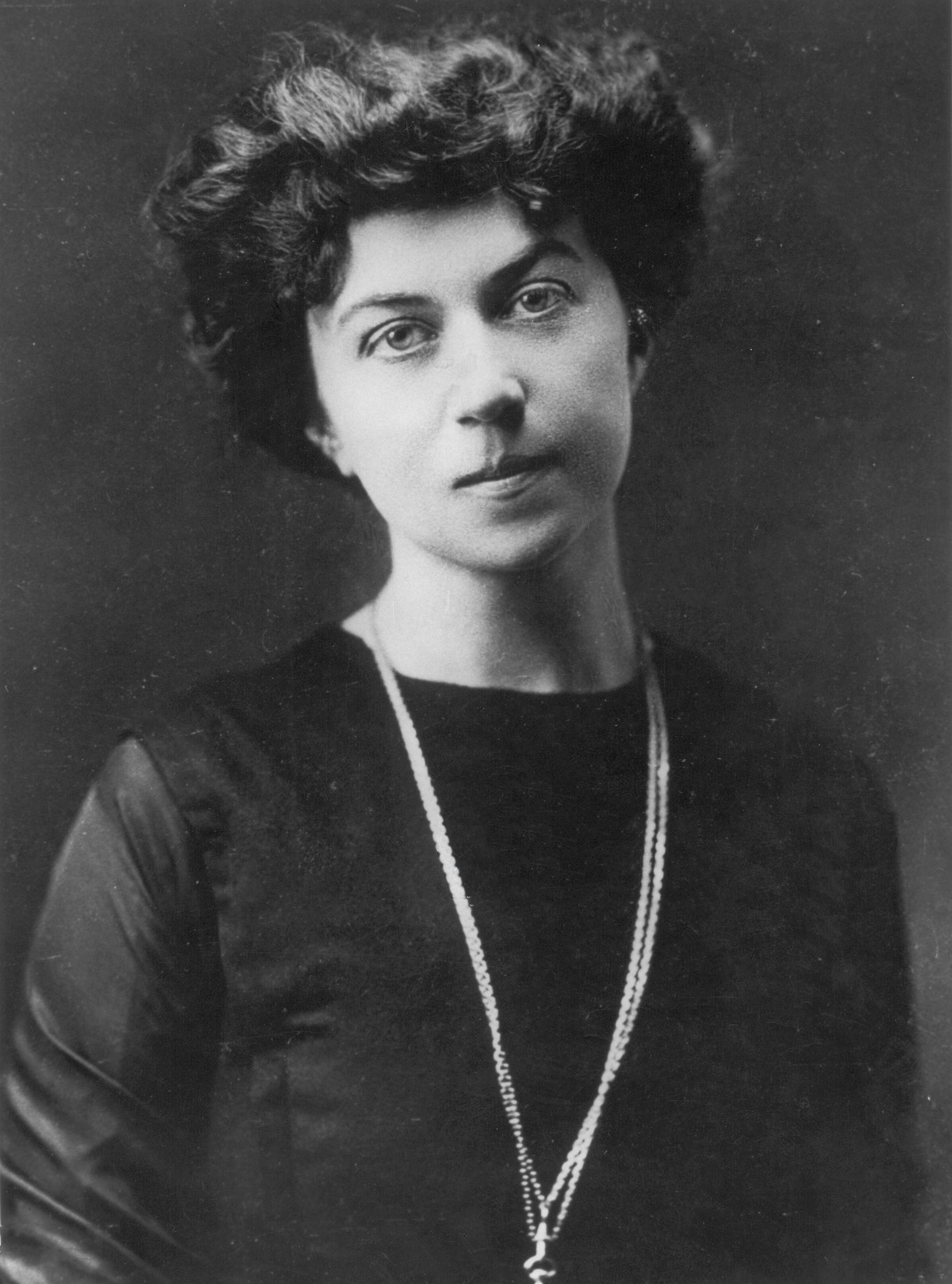
Alexandra Kollontai one of the most prominent spokespersons for the Workers' Opposition.

Members of the former Workers' Opposition continued to advocate their views during the period of the New Economic Policy but increasingly became politically marginalized. Nonetheless, on 5 July 1921 Kollontai took the floor before the Third Congress of the Comintern, bitterly attacking the policies of the Soviet government and warning that NEP 'threatened to disillusion workers, to strengthen the peasantry and petty bourgeoisie, and to facilitate the rebirth of capitalism'.

Shlyapnikov and his supporters also conducted discussions with Gavril Myasnikov's Workers Group, but unlike Myasnikov, were determined not to leave the ranks of the Communist Party. At the beginning of 1922, former exponents of the Workers' Opposition, such as Shlyapnikov and Medvedev, and other members of the party of working class origins signed the so-called Letter of the Twenty Two, appealing to the Comintern Executive against suppression of dissent within the Russian party and bourgeois infiltrations into the Soviet state and the party itself. Kollontai co-signed the letter, with her best friend Zoya Shadurskaia, as intellectuals of non-working-class extraction, but in February 1922 she was restrained by Trotsky and Zinoviev from speaking before the Comintern Executive on behalf of the views expressed in the appeal. Shlyapnikov, Kollontai, and Sergei Medvedev narrowly escaped expulsion from the Russian Communist Party at the party's subsequent Eleventh Congress in 1922, while two other signatories of the appeal, Flor Anisimovich Mitin (1882–1937) and Nikolái Vladimirovich Kuznetsov (1898–1937), were expelled. Kollontai later became an important diplomat and Shlyapnikov wrote memoirs.

In the latter half of the 1930s, Shlyapnikov and his closest comrades (Kollontai was not among them) were charged with involvement in a counterrevolutionary group called "Workers' Opposition" and with having linked up with the "counterrevolutionary Trotskyist–Zinovievist terrorist bloc". Despite their proclaiming themselves innocent, both Shlyapnikov and Medvedev, along with many others, were condemned to death and executed in September 1937. In her biography of Shlyapnikov Barbara Allen concludes the last chapter before epilogue, with these words:

There was no 'show trial' of the Workers' Opposition, either because it did not fit the narrative of oppositionism Stalin desired to construct or because Shlyapnikov and his closest comrades did not succumb to pressure to debase themselves and slander others in the service of the 'party'. For them, the party was not Stalin and his band, but a revolutionary political institution organised by workers in order to achieve a better life for the oppressed. This firm conviction helped them resist Stalin's rhetoric and narrative of the party's past and to imagine an alternative to his vision of socialism.

— Barbara C. Allen, Alexander Shlyapnikov, 1885–1937: Life of an Old Bolshevik, pp. 364-365

After the end of Stalinism, Shlyapnikov was rehabilitated in 1963, Medvedev in 1977. The decision annulling the latter's case for lack of evidence emphasized that "None of those judged on the Workers' Opposition case confessed guilt".

== Ideology ==
The Workers' Opposition advocated the role of unionized workers in directing the economy at a time when Soviet government organs were running industry by diktat and trying to exclude trade unions from a participatory role. Specifically, the Workers' Opposition demanded that unionized workers (blue and white collar) should elect representatives to a vertical hierarchy of councils that would oversee the economy. At all levels, elected leaders would be responsible to those who had elected them and could be removed from below. The Workers' Opposition demanded that Russian Communist Party secretaries at all levels cease petty interference in the operations of trade unions and that trade unions should be reinforced with staff and supplies to allow them to carry out their work effectively. Leaders of the Workers' Opposition were not opposed to the employment of "bourgeois specialists" in the economy, but did oppose giving such individuals strong administrative powers, unchecked from below. The "Workers' Opposition" based their ideas on the experience of the first months of Soviet power - a short period when the organization of production was really carried out on the basis of the self-government of the proletarians.

== Membership ==
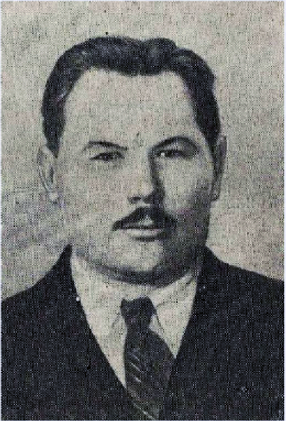
Aleksei Kiselyov, chair of the Miners’ Union and a signatory of the theses of the Workers’ Opposition (but not of the Letter of the 22)

The Workers' Opposition was led by Alexander Shlyapnikov, who was also chairman of the Russian Metalworkers' Union, and it consisted of trade union leaders and industrial administrators who had formerly been industrial workers. Alexandra Kollontai, the famous socialist feminist, was the group's mentor and advocate. Other prominent members included Sergei Medvedev and Mikhail Vladimirov (leaders of the Metalworkers' Union), Alexander Tolokontsev and Genrikh Bruno (artilleries industry leaders), Mikhail Chelyshev (a member of the Party Control Commission), Ivan Kutuzov (chairman of the Textileworkers' Union), Kirill Orlov (member of the Council of Military Industry and a participant in the 1905 mutiny on the Russian battleship Potemkin), and Aleksei Kiselyov (chairman of the Miners' Union). Yuri Lutovinov, a leader of the Metalworkers' Union and of the All-Union Central Council of Trade Unions, sometimes spoke for the group, but sometimes held his own opinion.

== Bibliography ==
- Allen, Barbara C (January 2015). Alexander Shlyapnikov, 1885–1937: Life of an Old Bolshevik. Leiden, The Netherlands: Brill (Historical Materialism Series). Paperback: Chicago: Haymarket Books, 2016.
- Allen, Barbara C., 'A Proletarian From a Novel': Politics, Identity, and Emotion in the Relationship between Alexander Shliapnikov and Alexandra Kollontai, 1911-1935 . "The Soviet and Post-Soviet Review", 35 (2008), No. 2, 21–54
- Allen, Barbara C., Early dissent within the party: Alexander Shliapnikov and the letter of the twenty-two . "The NEP Era: Soviet Russia 1921-1928", 1 (2007), 21–54
- Daniels, Robert. The Conscience of the Revolution: Communist Opposition in Soviet Russia. Cambridge, Mass., 1960; revised edition, Boulder, Col., 1988.
- Holmes, Larry E. For the Revolution Redeemed: The Workers Opposition in the Bolshevik Party, 1919-1921. The Carl Beck Papers in Russian and East European Studies, no. 802 (1990).
- Kollontai, Alexandra. Rabochaya oppozitsiya. Moscow, 1921. Translated into English by Workers' Dreadnought in London (22 April - 19 August 1921) and the IWW in the United States (The Workers' Opposition in Russia, 1921).
- Rogovin, Vadim Zakharovich (2021). Was There an Alternative? Trotskyism: a Look Back Through the Years. Translated by Frederick Choate. Manchester: Mehring Books. ISBN 978-1-893638-97-6.
- Sorenson, Jay. The Life and Death of Soviet Trade Unionism: 1917-1928. New York, 1969.
- The Workers' Opposition in the Russian Communist Party: Documents, 1919-30. Edited and translated by Barbara C. Allen. Leiden, The Netherlands: Brill, 2021. Paperback: Chicago: Haymarket Books, 2022.
