= Sergei Medvedev (revolutionary) =

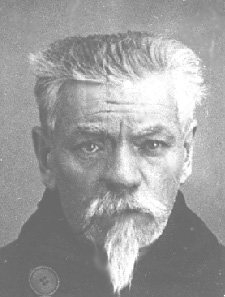
Sergei Medvedev

Sergei Pavlovich Medvedev (Russian: Серге́й Па́влович Медве́дев; 15 March 1885 – 10 September 1937) was a Russian Bolshevik revolutionary, metalworker, and trade union organizer. He was born into the peasant estate in a family of Russian ethnicity in Kortino, Moscow Governorate and grew up in the countryside near Moscow and in St. Petersburg. After receiving a primary school education, he began factory work at age thirteen. He first worked at the Obukhov factory in St. Petersburg and participated in the 1901 Obukhov strike. He became a socialist at age fifteen and joined the Bolsheviks when the Russian Social Democratic Workers Party split in 1903.

Medvedev was active in the revolutionary underground, organizing illegal party cells. The tsarist government sentenced him numerous times to prison and to terms of exile within Russia. Medvedev was also an organizer in the underground section of the insurance movement in 1912–14. He spent most of World War I in Siberian exile. In 1917, Medvedev organized the Achinsk Soviet of Workers and Soldiers Deputies. In 1918, he returned to Petrograd to work in the All-Russian Soviet of Workers, Soldiers and Peasants Deputies and then served as a political commissar for the Red Army during the Civil War; he was stationed in Smolensk.

In early 1920, Medvedev went to Moscow to work in the central committee of the All-Russian Union of Metalworkers. Together with Alexander Shlyapnikov and others, he participated in the Workers' Opposition, a tendency of the Russian Communist Party, which called for worker initiative in managing the economy and for working-class members to prevail in leading organs of the Communist Party. At the Tenth Party Congress of 1921, however, internal factions were banned and the Workers's Opposition was dissolved with immediate effect, even though Medvedev was elected a candidate member of the Central Committee. In February 1922 he was a signatory of the so-called Letter of the Twenty Two, whereby several former members of the Workers' Opposition and other party members of working class origins appealed to the 1922 conference of the Comintern Executive against the undemocratic internal practices in use within the Russian party. At the subsequent Eleventh Party Congress (March–April 1922), Medvedev, Shlyapnikov and Alexandra Kollontai (who, too, had co-signed the letter) were charged with having insisted on factional work and their expulsion from the party was proposed. Eventually, a resolution was passed allowing the three to remain in the party unless they committed further violations of its discipline, while two other signatories of the appeal, F. Mitin (b. 1882) and N. Kuznetsov (1898–1935), were expelled.

In 1924, Medvedev wrote "Letter to a Baku Oppositionist", for which he and Shliapnikov were investigated by the Party Central Control Commission (CCC) in 1926. The letter criticized Communist Party concessions toward the peasantry, called for development of heavy industry, freedom of criticism within the party, and criticized Comintern policy. Medvedev worked in the Commissariat of Heavy Industry during the late 1920s, but lost his post when Sergo Ordzhonikidze became Commissar of Heavy Industry. In 1930, he and Shliapnikov were investigated for alleged ties with oppositionists in Omsk. In 1932, the CCC investigated Medvedev on the Ryutin Affair, but he was not charged with any violations.

Medvedev was purged from the party in late 1933, but he had not been a member of a party cell or possessed a party card for several years. In January 1934, Medvedev was sent into administrative exile in the far north of Russia. After Leningrad party chief Sergey Kirov was assassinated in December 1934, Stalin ordered the arrests of many former oppositionists. Medvedev was among these; in January 1935, he was returned to Moscow to undergo interrogation. Charged under Article 58 of the Soviet Criminal Code, Medvedev never confessed to the charges against him, nor did he implicate others. Nevertheless, he was found guilty and was executed on September 10, 1937.

In 1978, the Soviet state posthumously rehabilitated him of criminal charges and in 1988, the Communist Party restored his membership.

== Bibliography ==
- Allen, Barbara C., Early dissent within the party: Alexander Shliapnikov and the letter of the twenty-two . "The NEP Era: Soviet Russia 1921-1928", 1 (2007), 21–54
- Allen, Barbara C. "Friendship in Times of Factionalism and Terror: Aleksandr Shliapnikov and Sergei Medvedev." Revolutionary Russia (London, England), vol. 20, no. 1 (June 2007): 75–93.
- Flenley, Paul. "S. P. Medvedev." pp. 638–639. In Biographical Dictionary of European Labour Leaders. T.Lane (ed.) Greenwood Press, London, 1995.
