= Zoya Shadurskaia =

Zoya Leonidovna Shadurskaia (1873-1939) was a well-educated Russian noble who was active in Russian revolutionary movement from the 1890s. She was a feminist and remained life long friends with Alexandra Kollontai.

Zoya met Kollantai as a child in 1877 in Bulgaria during the Russo-Turkish War.

== Political activism ==
She supported the Zimmerwald movement in Paris during the First World War. She returned to Russia in 1917 and joined the Bolsheviks. Like Kollontai she was active in the Workers' Opposition and in 1922 with her was one of the two people who signed the Letter of the Twenty Two following its initial publication.
