= Conference of the Twenty Two =

The Conference of the Twenty Two was an important organizational meeting in the foundation of the Bolshevik faction of the Russian Social Democratic Labour Party. Despite its name the conference was only attended by 19 people, the remaining three adding their names to the text subsequently.

The conference adopted Vladimir Lenin's text To the Party.

== Attendees ==
The conference was held near Geneva between 30 July and 1 August 1904. It was attended by:

- Vladimir Lenin
- Alexander Bogdanov
- Vladimir Bonch-Bruevich
- Vera Velichkina
- Sergey Ivanovich Gusev
- Pyotr Krasikov

== See also ==
- Letter of the Twenty Two, 1922
