= Military Opposition =

Faction of the Russian Communist Party (Bolsheviks)

The Military Opposition (Russian: Военная оппозиция) was a faction of the Russian Communist Party (Bolsheviks) which arose in 1918–1919, chiefly among Bolsheviks serving in the Red Army who opposed Leon Trotsky's efforts to organize the army along conventional lines. At its high point of influence at the Eighth Party Congress (18 to 23 March 1919), it was led by Ivan Smirnov and others (including Georgy Safarov, Georgy Pyatakov, Andrei Bubnov, Yemelyan Yaroslavsky, Vladimir Sorin, Filipp Goloshchyokin, Aleksandr Miasnikov, N. G. Tomachev, R. S. Samoilov, and S. K. Minin). Many of the Military Opposition were former "Left Communists" who had opposed the signing of the Treaty of Brest-Litovsk (1918) that had exited Russia from World War I.

The members of the faction criticized the amount of authority enjoyed by "military specialists" (former Tsarist officers), and demanded that more power be given to the army's political commissars. While the earlier demands of the Left for a return to a militia army with elected officers, the abolition of all ranks, and the abolition of the death penalty, had largely been silenced by March 1919, resentment was expressed against Trotsky's high-handed manner. At a closed meeting, the Military Opposition won a vote on the matter by 37 votes to 20, although in the congress itself Trotsky won by a vote of 174 to 95. To placate the opposition, increased numbers of "red commanders” (officers of proletarian origins) began being trained at the General Staff Academy of the Red Army and other institutions. The issue flared up again at both the Ninth Party Congress in 1920 and the 10th Party Congress in 1921. There, Trotsky was opposed by many (such as Kliment Voroshilov) who led the movement to remove him from power following the death of Vladimir Lenin in 1924.
