= Aleksei Kiselyov (politician) =

Soviet politician (1879–1937)

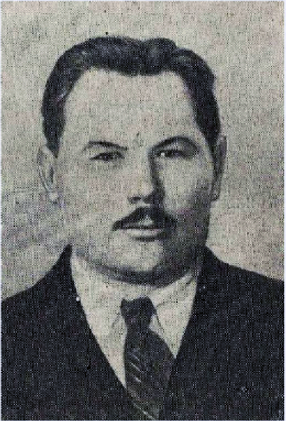

Aleksei Semyonovich Kiselyov (Russian: Алексей Семёнович Киселёв) (1879 – October 30, 1937) was a Russian Bolshevik Party leader and Soviet official, who was from a working-class background.

== Biography ==
Born near Ivanovo-Voznesensk, he joined the Russian Social Democratic Labour Party in 1898 working for the party in Ivanovo-Voznesensk, Moscow, Kharkov, Baku and Odessa. He was arrested on multiple occasions. In 1914, Kiselev joined the Central Committee of the party, and shortly thereafter he was arrested again and sent to Siberia by the Tsarist authorities.

Permitted to return to the west by the general amnesty of the February Revolution in 1917, Kiselev resumed his position on the Central Committee. He later became only a candidate (alternate) member of the Central Committee, and served this role from 1917 to 1934.

In 1920 Kiselev supported the Workers' Opposition, but conformed to party discipline when the group was banned. From 1923-1924 he served as a member of the presidium of the TSKK (Central Control Commission of the Communist Party). In 1923 Kiselev also became the People's Commissar of the Workers' and Peasants' Inspection of the Russian SFSR, and a reserve member to the same role for the whole Soviet Union.

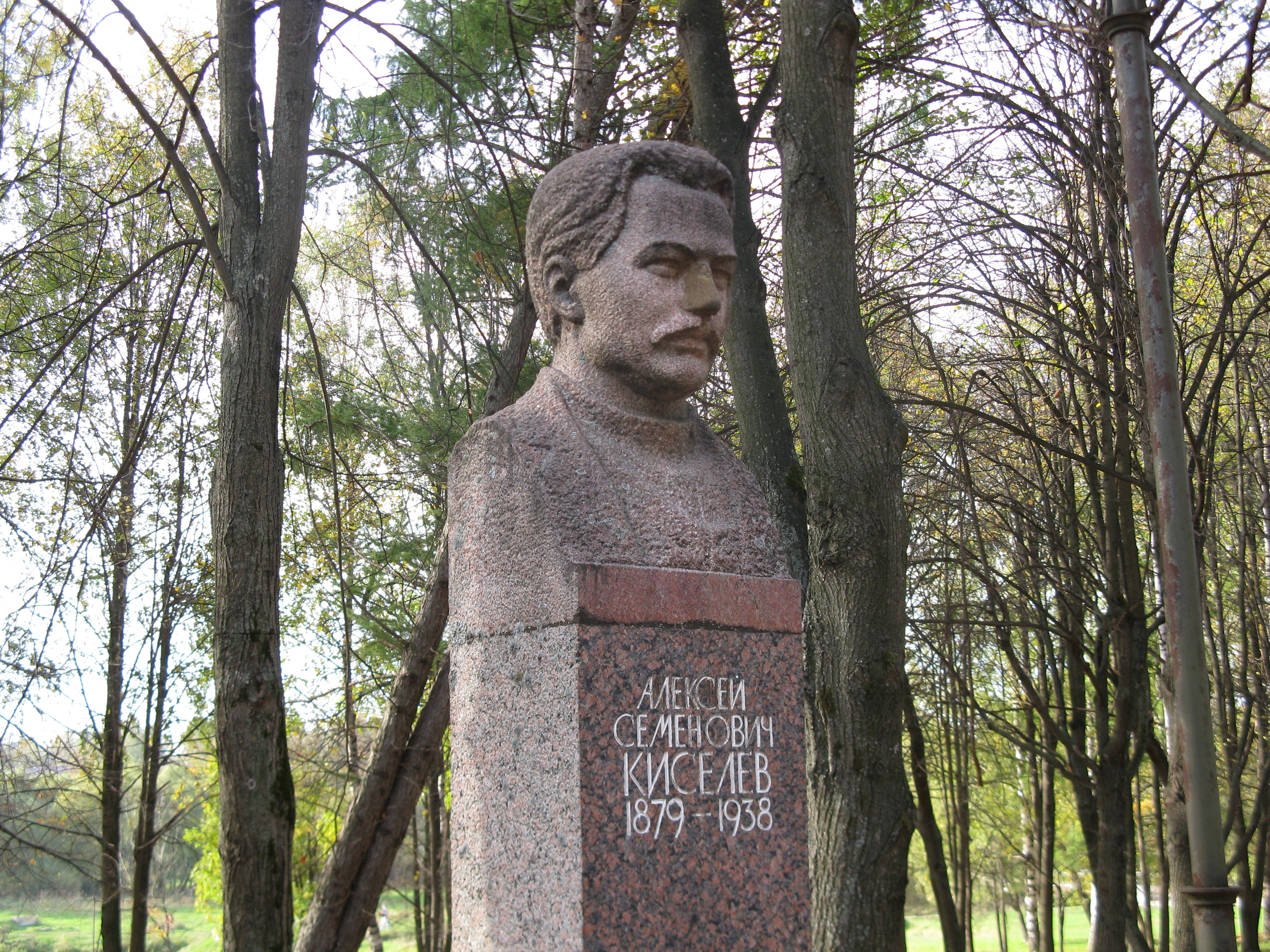
Bust of Aleksei Kiselyov in the city of Ivanovo

With Joseph Stalin in power, on September 7, 1937, after 20 years of service to the Soviet government, Kiselev was arrested for allegedly belonging to an "anti-Soviet counter-revolutionary organisation". Kiselev was shot less than two months later on October 30, 1937.

He was among the first to be rehabilitated, in 1956 (at the very beginning of De-Stalinization).
