= Second All Russian Conference of Trade Unions =

The Second All Russian Conference of Trade Unions took place in February 1906. Eighteen voting delegates were present representing ten different factory centres. It was primarily composed of intellectuals belonging to the Russian Social Democratic Labour Party. At the time the Russian trade union movement had an individual membership of around 200,000.

== Outcomes ==
An Organisational Commission was established. However plans for a congress came to nothing following Stolypin's Coup of June 1907.
