= Third All-Russian Conference of Trade Unions =

National conference of trade unions

The Third All Russian Conference of Trade Unions(Третья Всероссийская конференция профессиональных союзов) was the first national conference of trade unions held in Russia following the February Revolution. It was held in Petrograd 20–28 June 1917.

== Delegates ==
The conference was attended by 211 delegates representing 380,000 workers. These delegates were 73 Bolsheviks, 36 Mensheviks, 6 Menshevik Internationalists, 11 Bundists, 31 non-fractional Social Democrats, 25 Social Revolutionaries and 7 delegates of no known party affiliation.

== Discussions ==
V. P. Grinevich, a Menshevik started the discussion on the role of the trade unions, which he characterised as conducting the economic struggle of the working class, depicting the strike as the principal weapon while under capitalism. He argued that they should not involve themselves in the organisation of production, a role he allocated to the state. The Internationalists criticised this view as supporting state control rather than workers' control.

Nikolai Glebov-Avilov presented the Bolshevik positions at this conference:

- Economic Control Commissions should be attached to the central administration of the unions
- these Commissions should be made up of members of the Factory Committee
- these Commissions should co-operate with the Factory Committees in each individual enterprise.
- the Factory Committees should also be financially dependent upon the union.

== Influence of metalworkers union ==
The All-Russian Metalworkers Union played a prominent role at the conference. It was during this conference they elected their Temporary Central Committee.
