= First All Russian Conference of Trade Unions =

The First All Russian Conference of Trade Unions was held in Moscow in October 1905. It was attended by 26 unions from Moscow with a further 10 from further afield. All "mutual aid societies and trade unions as are composed of wage-earners of all trades of a proletarian character and are directly or indirectly fighting capital" were invited.

== Outcomes ==
The Central Bureau of Trade Unions was established.
