= 11th Congress of the Russian Communist Party (Bolsheviks) =

1922 meeting of Soviet delegates

The 11th Congress of the Communist Party of the Soviet Union was held during 27 March – 2 April 1922 in Moscow. The congress was attended by 522 with a casting vote alongside 165 with consultative vote, and elected the 11th Central Committee.

The main purpose of the congress was to review the results of the New Economic Policy that was decided in the 10th Congress. As a result, the congress concluded that the capitalist mixed economy in the Soviet Union would need to come to an end. This led them to resolve that the trade unions were to be given more power in both the economy and politics.

== Background ==
During the 11th Congress, Leon Trotsky attacked Sergey Ivanovich Gusev and Mikhail Frunze over Red Army policies, specifically matters of discipline, political doctrine, and relations with the peasantry. Trotsky lost the debate, which resulted in a discrediting of civilian critics of the Red Army. As a result, civilians were increasingly locked out of military-related resolutions following the 11th Congress.

The most far-reaching event was the appointment of Joseph Stalin as the party's first General Secretary. Bukharin and Rykov were promoted to the Politburo.

The main points raised in the session, Lenin declared that the retreat—the concessions to private-economic capitalism—had been completed, a link with the peasant economy was being established, the alliance between the working class and the peasantry had been strengthened, and economic achievements were evident. He put forward a new task: first, to halt the economic retreat and regroup forces to attack the capitalist elements, provided that the limits of tolerance for capitalism in the transitional period were established and tested, and the expansion of the scope for the development of capitalism in a diversified economy had to gradually involve the peasant masses in building socialism on the basis of the wide use of trade and commodity-money relations.

He also pointed out that every member of the Bolsheviks should learn management to create an administration which was more capable than that of the capitalists. Lenin put forward the slogan "learn to trade" and called on the communists to improve the organisation and management of the national economy and raise the standard of culture. He sharply criticised arrogance, covering up mistakes and shortcomings; he emphasised the need for the correct selection and placement of personnel, the organisation of a systematic verification of performance.

The congress approved the political and organisational line of the Central Committee and indicated in the resolution that the concessions made to private-economic capitalism have been exhausted and the next task is to regroup the party forces with the aim of launching an offensive against the western elements. The resolution cleared up the distinction in the work of the party and soviets, and drew attention to the increased role of the All-Russian Central Executive Committee and local Soviets as practical leaders of economic life.

Having approved the activities of the representatives of the CPUSSR in the ECCI, the congress fully agreed with the tactics of the united front pursued by the Comintern's 4th Congress. Particular attention was given to enhancing the role of trade unions under the NEP. It was decided that they must become the closest and most indispensable allies of the state power in all its political and economic activities. In the resolution on financial policy, measures were developed to strengthen the exchange rate of the soviet ruble, increase state income, stabilise prices, etc. The resolution “On Work in the Countryside” condemned attempts at administrative pressure on agricultural institutions and cooperatives. The main task of party work in the countryside was recognised as providing practical assistance to the peasantry in increasing agricultural production.

Much attention at the congress was devoted to raising the theoretical and ideological level of the communists, improving the qualitative composition of the party, and strengthening its ranks. The conditions for admission to the party were changed: it was made difficult for "uncleanly proletarian elements" to join its ranks.

The congress finally approved the resolution of the XI All-Russian Conference of the RCP coded "On the question of strengthening the party, in connection with the experience of checking its personnel." In its resolution on the issue of the Red Army, the congress recognised the need to continue work to increase its combat effectiveness. The final report was heard from the commission created by the congress, which considered the issue of some members of the former "workers' opposition" who, contrary to the decision of the tenth congress in 1921 on the liquidation of all factions, continued factional activities. On the eve of the congress, they addressed the Comintern with a statement in which they set out their point of view on the situation in the party and the country, pointing out the departure of the party from the interests of the working class. The congress condemned the activities of the former ruling leaders.
