= Alexander Shliapnikov =

Russian leader of the Workers' Opposition in the USSR

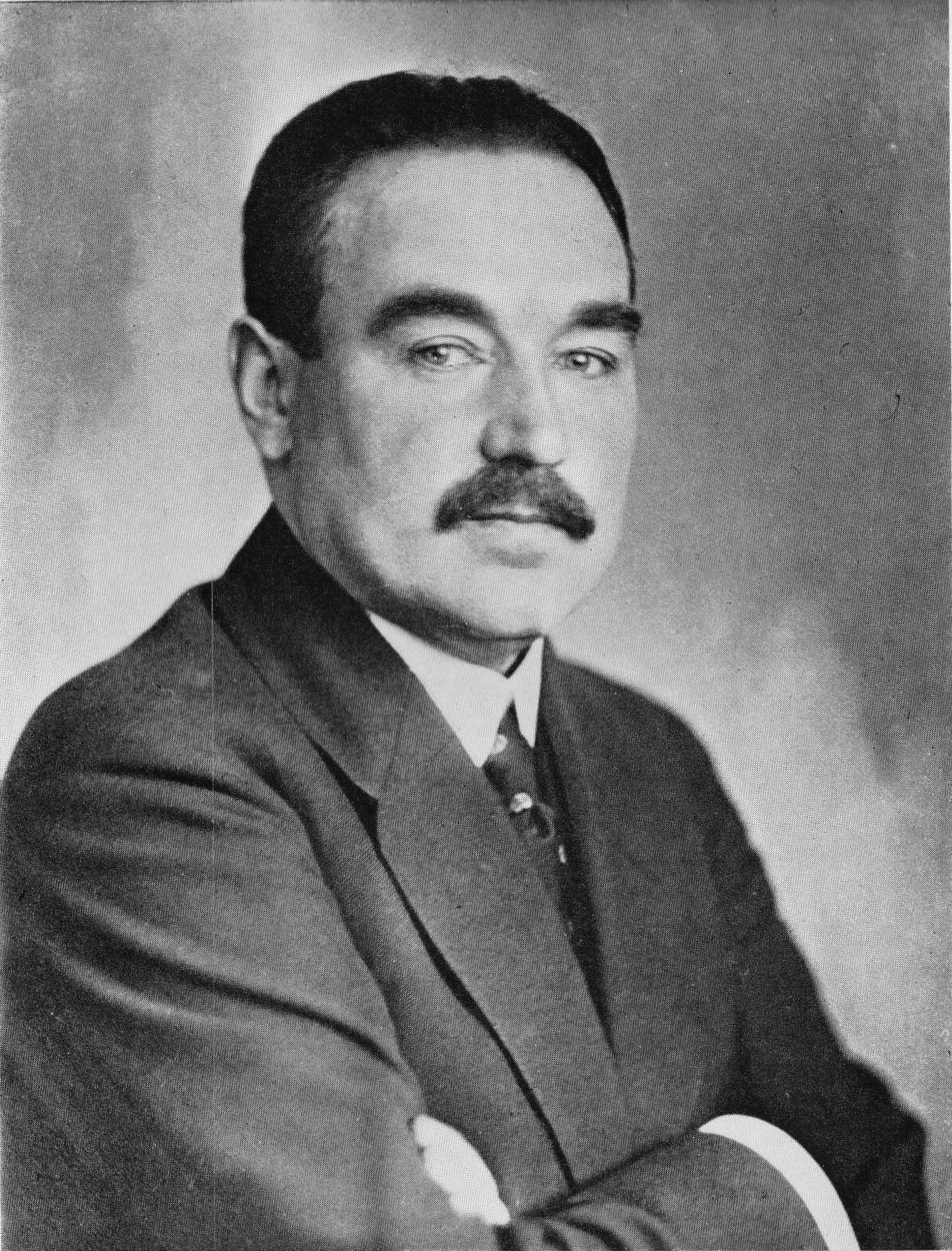
Alexander Shliapnikov

Alexander Gavrilovich Shliapnikov (Russian: Александр Гаврилович Шляпников; August 30, 1885 – September 2, 1937) was a Russian communist revolutionary, metalworker, and trade union leader. He is best remembered as a memoirist of the October Revolution of 1917 and as the leader of the Workers' Opposition, one of the primary opposition movements inside the Russian Communist Party during the 1920s.

== Biography ==
=== Early years ===
Alexander Shliapnikov was born August 30, 1885, in Murom, Russian Empire to a poor family of Russian ethnicity and of the Old Believer religion. His father died when he was a small child. In 1898, at the age of 13, Shliapnikov began factory work at the Kondratov factory in Vacha, and one year later began working in Sormovo factories in Nizhny Novgorod, where he had his first encounter with Marxist literature. At the invitation of his older brother Peter, Shliapnikov moved to St. Petersburg in late 1900, beginning work alongside his brother at the Semyannikov (also known as Nevsky) factory, and rapidly became involved in labor unrest there. By age fifteen, Shliapnikov had been blacklisted and could no longer find work at the major factories in St. Petersburg, and was forced to return to Sormovo, where he once again found himself unemployable due to his suspected radicalism. While in Sormovo, he was entrusted with illegal literature to distribute back in Murom, which he later designated as his initiation into the Russian Social Democratic Labour Party.

=== Pre-Revolution Activities ===
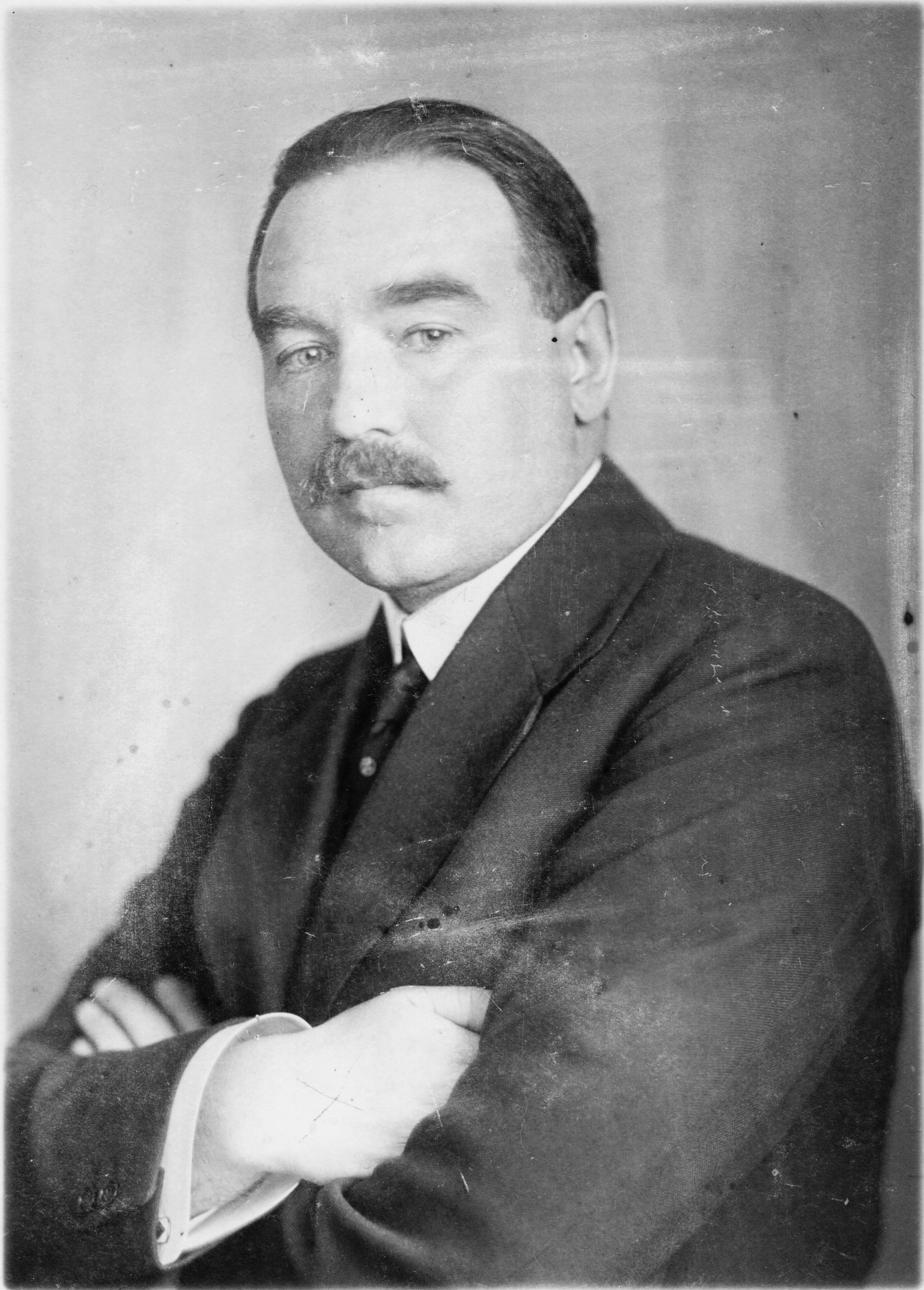
Shliapnikov c. 1925

==== 1905 and Emigration from Russia ====
According to Shliapnikov himself, he joined the Bolsheviks in 1903, the year of their split with the Mensheviks. He continued to work as a factory worker in Murom even as he deepened his involvement in political activism, and in 1904 he was arrested for distribution of illegal literature. Shliapnikov managed to convince the prosecutor that he had been entrapped by police provocateurs, and thus won his freedom, but also attracted the attention of the local Black Hundreds, who brutally assaulted him on his way home. Undeterred, Shliapnikov continued his revolutionary activities, and during the 1905 revolution, he led an armed demonstration of workers in Murom, helping to take the local police chief hostage and force the police to retreat, resulting in another arrest. Even after being freed by the general amnesty issued in October, his continued militancy and intransigence saw him jailed for a third time, in a prison stint which would last until January 1907. Almost immediately after his release, Shliapnikov was drafted into the army, and after refusing to take an oath of loyalty to the Tsar, the police once again arrested him. Freed on bail, he vanished into the underground, finding work in the Electrical Station of 1886 in St. Petersburg, where he met fellow metalworker Sergei Medvedev, establishing what would become a decades long friendship. Later in 1907, the now 22-year-old Shliapnikov became a member of the Petersburg Committee of the RSDRP(b), and due to his growing prominence, at the end of 1907 his friends advised him to emigrate from Russia. Entrusted with letters for Bolshevik leader Vladimir Lenin, he left Russia in January 1908, and after arriving in Switzerland, where he had a brief meeting with Lenin, continued onward to Paris, and within two months Shliapnikov found work in an automobile factory in the suburb of Asnières.

==== In Exile ====
Shliapnikov acclimated well to life in Paris, improving his French language skills, giving speeches, writing articles, and participating in both Russian émigré politics and French trade unionism, all while continuing to work as a metalworker. He joined a regional committee of the SFIO and became a leader in the Parisian Mechanics’ Trade Union, putting him into contact with a diverse collection of French, German, Swedish, and Norwegian metalworkers and trade unionists. Shliapnikov also became romantically involved with Alexandra Kollontai in 1911, who at that time was still a Menshevik, and with her travelled to Germany in January 1912, but he did not adjust well to life there, and within a few months returned to France, although he continued to visit Kollontai in Germany. During this time period, Shliapnikov began to write more frequently, and became involved in French trade union debates, arguing against both "non-political" unionists, whose efforts he perceived as only weakening unions, and anarcho-syndicalists, who he accused of condescension towards the masses and an unwillingness to draw them into revolutionary work.

==== World War I ====
By the spring of 1914, Shliapnikov found himself unable to obtain industrial work, and as such resolved to return to Russia, which he did in April 1914, and due to his distrust of police informant Roman Malinovsky and habit of avoiding group meetings, managed to evade the wave of arrests which befell so many Bolsheviks in the summer of 1914. Refusing a position in the central Bolshevik party organization, he found employment as a metalworker, pretending to be a French worker to evade the authorities, while continuing to participate in the Bolshevik underground. The outbreak of World War I forced Shliapnikov to leave Russia, as the French government recalled its citizens and thereby destroyed his cover, and in September 1914, the Petersburg Committee sent him to Scandinavia. Due to the outbreak of war, Sweden, which had remained neutral, became one of the only routes by which Bolshevik emigres could communicate with Russian Bolsheviks, but despite successfully organizing a route into Russia using Swedish transport workers, Shliapnikov found himself unable to obtain either industrial work in Sweden or funding from Russian party organizations. Forced to take out loans from Swedish socialists, he sent several packages of material to Russia, proposing potential smuggling routes, but received no response, and his smuggling network lost too many links to continue operating. Kollontai, who was also living in Sweden, assisted him in these ventures, but was arrested for her anti-war activities and deported to Copenhagen, and Swedish socialists encouraged Shliapnikov to leave voluntarily so he could re-enter the country at a later date. Traveling to London in April 1915, he almost immediately found work as a turner at the Fiat automobile plant in Wembley, and while there joined the Amalgamated Society of Engineers and participated in their activities.

By August 1915, Shliapnikov had collected enough money to re-establish the Bolshevik smuggling network in Scandinavia, but he quickly became convinced that he needed to return to Russia to set up operations from that end, and left Scandinavian operations in the hands of Nikolai Bukharin, Yevgenia Bosch, and Georgy Pyatakov. According to instructions from Lenin and Grigory Zinoviev, he was to set up a small bureau of the Central Committee in Russia, and recruit members only from workers, such as Vasily Schmidt, and to produce a resolution on the war. To ensure he had sufficient authority to conduct his tasks, Lenin and Zinoviev co-opted Shliapnikov onto the Central Committee, and he successfully arrived in Petrograd in October 1915. Despite Shliapnikov's efforts, the Okhrana rapidly arrested the majority of the newly formed Russian Bureau after he left Russia in February 1916, and when he returned to Scandinavia, he had to re-establish the smuggling network due to arrests by Swedish police.

While in Scandinavia, Shliapnikov became embroiled in a spat between Lenin, Bukharin, Bosch, and Pyatakov over the proper attitude towards nationalism, which halted production of the journal Kommunist and disrupted the flow of literature and communication to Russia. Frustrated and angered by the disruption of practical work for the sake of factionalism, he accused Lenin of nepartiinost, castigated Bukharin, Bosch, and Pyatakov for being incompetent organizers, and during the Summer of 1916, set off for America with the goal of raising funds. At the same time, Kollontai decided to end her relationship with Shliapnikov, and chose to leave a letter indicating as such for him to read upon his return, and he would not see her again until March 1917 in Petrograd, when he harshly rebuked her for having broken up with him in such a "rude" and "hurtful" fashion. Shliapnikov had little success fundraising in America, but upon returning to Scandinavia in September 1916, he recommended that Bukharin travel to America to provide an articulate Bolshevik voice in the pages of the socialist magazine Novy Mir.

==== 1917 ====
Shliapnikov eagerly returned to Russia in October 1916. To help him rebuild the Russian Bureau, he recruited Vyacheslav Molotov and Petr Zalutskii, and they were the senior Bolsheviks in Petrograd during the February Revolution in 1917. Under Shliapnikov, the Russian Bureau took a stance of opposition towards the provisional government, and called for the Petrograd Soviet to form a revolutionary government. The arrival of more prominent Bolsheviks like Lev Kamenev and Joseph Stalin from Siberian exile brought on a struggle over leadership and the correct stance towards the war. The "moderates" under Kamenev successfully outmaneuvered the Russian Bureau, seizing control of the party newspaper Pravda, and refusing to publish Vladimir Lenin's "Letters from Afar" urging opposition to the provisional government. On March 15, Kamenev published an editorial supporting the war effort, and by March 18 had persuaded the Petersburg committee to provide "conditional support" to the provisional government.

The arrival of Vladimir Lenin in Petrograd during April seriously challenged the dominant "moderate" line and brought about a shift in the party's positions, but Shliapnikov, hospitalized for weeks due to an automobile accident, did not play a major role in this affair. Instead, Shliapnikov and Konstantin Eremeev played a leading role in organizing a "Workers' Guard" among radical workers in the Vyborg district of Petrograd, and in August 1917, Shliapnikov joined the newly formed general staff of the Red Guard. On May 7, Shliapnikov was elected to the central board of the Petrograd Metalworkers' Union alongside the unaligned socialist Aleksei Gastev and the Menshevik I.G. Volkov, and once he recovered from his automobile accident, he chaired the first Central Committee of the Petrograd Metalworkers' Union on May 27. By June 11, the Union had established a system of supporting unemployed workers, set up the journal "Metallist", begun to mediate conflicts between workers and industrialists. Over the next month, delegates from across Russia formed the first All-Russian Metalworkers' Union, and Shliapnikov found himself elected to its central committee alongside three other Bolsheviks, Volkov and three other Mensheviks, and Gastev. Due to Gastev's support, he was elected as chairman of the Central Committee during its first meeting on June 29. He led negotiations of a wage agreement between Petrograd metalworkers and factory owners in 1917.

=== After the revolution ===
Following the October Revolution and the Bolshevik seizure of power, Shliapnikov was appointed Commissar of Labor. Shliapnikov supported a coalition government composed of left socialist parties, and signed Zinoviev's and Kamenev's statement supporting a socialist coalition government, but unlike other "moderates" refused to resign from his post. The coalition agreement reached with the Left-SRs mollified most of the "moderate" Bolsheviks, and Shliapnikov would later claim that he only supported an alliance with the Left-SRs. In contrast to his "moderate" position in regards to coalitions with other socialist parties, Shliapnikov held a decisively "radical" stance towards the Constituent Assembly. The Bolshevik CC assigned him to take control of Bolshevik preparations for the Constituent Assembly, countering Zinoviev's and Kamenev's efforts to install a "moderate" provisional bureau which would support their stances, and Shliapnikov wholeheartedly supported the dispersal of the Constituent Assembly over the course of January 18 and 19.

Shliapnikov played an important role in evacuating industry from Petrograd, as the Germans approached in 1918. As Commissar of Labor, he helped draft important directives on workers' control of industry and nationalization of industry and he staffed government bureaucracies with staff from trade unions. In the summer of 1918, he went to the south of Russia on a mission to gather food for the population of the Bolshevik-controlled cities of Northern Russia.

In October 1918 Shliapnikov was replaced as Commissar of Labor by Vasili Schmidt and then initially served as a member of the Revolutionary Military Council of the Southern Front, chaired by Stalin in Tsaritsyn, and shortly after as Chairman of the Revolutionary Military Council of the Caspian-Caucasian Front, based in Astrakhan, which he had proposed to create. During the Civil War, Shliapnikov began to criticize the increasing tendency of the Russian Communist Party and Soviet government to rely on authoritarian measures to enforce policies towards industry and industrial workers. To Shliapnikov, denial of workers' right to participate in economic decision-making was a step away from the goals of the 1917 revolution.

=== Opposition leader ===
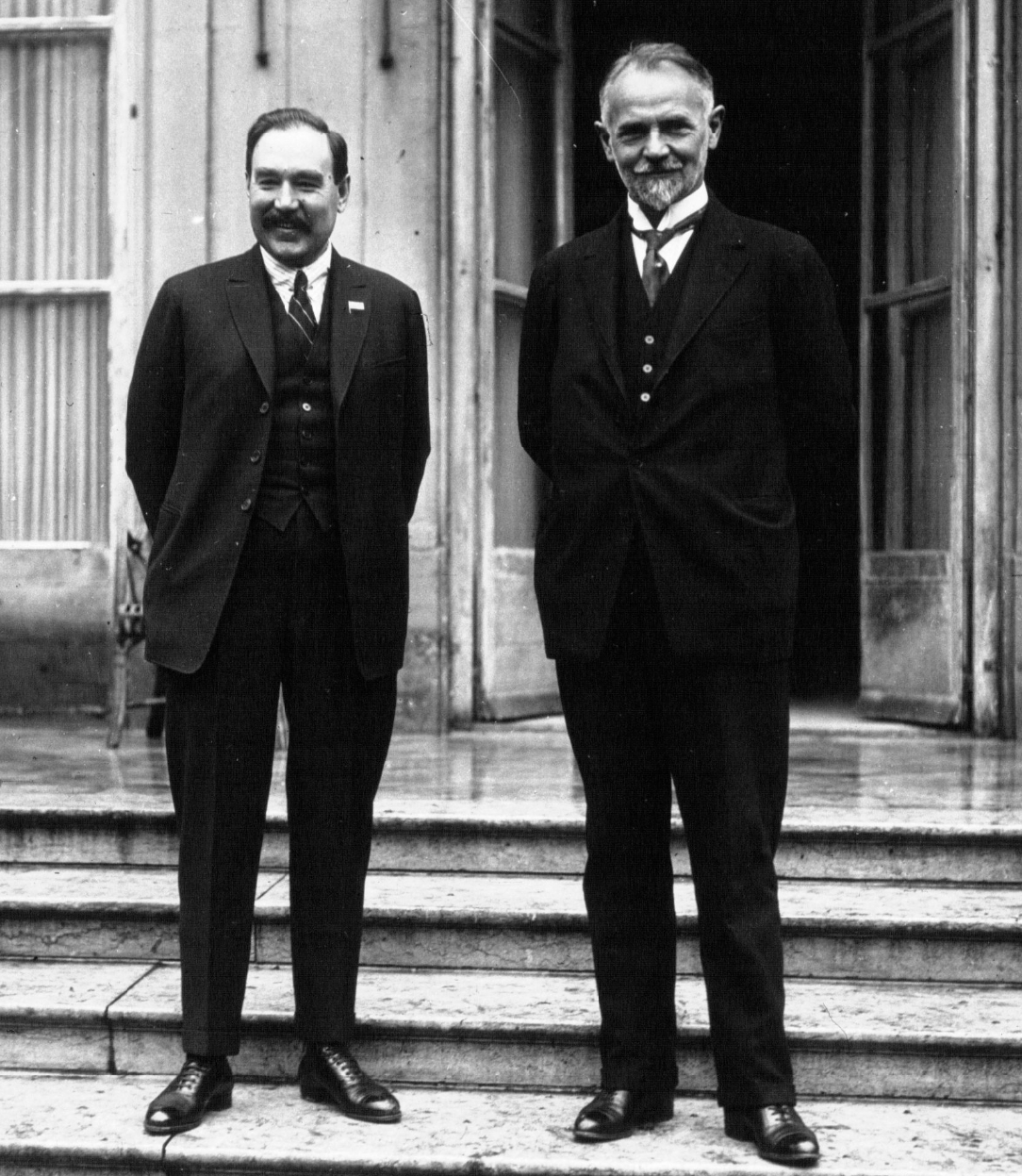
Alexander Shliapnikov (on left) with Leonid Krasin in 1924

Shliapnikov became leader of the Workers' Opposition movement inside the Russian Communist Party. Alexandra Kollontai was a mentor and advocate of the group, which was composed of leaders of trade unions and industry who were all former industrial workers, usually metalworkers. This movement advocated the role of workers, organized in trade unions, in managing the economy and the political party. The Russian Communist Party leaders succeeded in suppressing the Workers' Opposition and in 1921–22 finally subordinated trade union leadership to the Party. In 1921, Shliapnikov was forced out of his elected post as chairman of the Metalworkers' Union.

In 1922, Shliapnikov and some other trade-unionists from within and outside the Workers' Opposition, supported by Alexandra Kollontai, presented an appeal, called the Letter of the Twenty Two, to the Communist International Executive, requesting that the Comintern help heal a "rift" within the Russian Communist Party between Party leaders and workers. Party leaders and Party-controlled media condemned the appeal. Two of the signatories of the appeal were expelled from the Party, but Shliapnikov, Kollontai, and Sergei Medvedev narrowly escaped expulsion.

Shliapnikov turned to writing his memoirs and held jobs in metals import and economic planning institutions. The Party Central Control Commission investigated him and Sergei Medvedev in 1926 and in 1930 for alleged factionalism in connection with the formation of oppositionist groups among workers in Baku and Omsk. In 1932, the Party Politburo ordered Shliapnikov to publish a public confession of "political errors" in writing his memoirs of the revolution, under pain of being purged from the party. He "acknowledged mistakes in his memoirs of 1917, but in language that made his errors appear less grievous [...] Nevertheless, the 'confession' as it appeared in Pravda on 9 March changed his claim of having been misunderstood to a cruder and more thorough repentance. Kaganovich may have dictated this 'confession'. Secondary and tertiary literature has gone so far as to interpret the March 1932 statement as a repudiation of all his former oppositional stances in party discussions. In fact, the original statement Shliapnikov wrote and signed was not even a complete repudiation of his memoirs".

=== Death and legacy ===
Shliapnikov was expelled from the Communist Party in 1933 and imprisoned in 1935 for alleged political crimes. Charged under Article 58 of the RSFSR Criminal Code, he did not confess guilt or implicate others. Nevertheless, he was found guilty, based on others' testimony, and was executed on September 2, 1937.

His wife was also arrested and sentenced to eight years in prison, while their three children were dispatched to separate orphanages, being only later permitted to reunite. In 1948–1951 all three children, who were not older than 20, and their mother were arrested during a new wave of terror and sentenced to prison camp in Siberia, the only female child, Irina, getting her sentence immediately changed to internal exile in Krasnoyarsk. They were all released in the mid-1950s. Shliapnikov was posthumously rehabilitated in 1963 and restored to membership in the Communist Party in 1988.

In an address delivered in 1975 at an AFL–CIO meeting in Washington, DC, Nobel laureate, Russian dissident, and famed author Aleksandr Solzhenitsyn asserted that "before the Revolution the head of the Communist Party of Russia was Shliapnikov – not Lenin" and that Shliapnikov's name was unknown because he represented the true interests of the workers, in contrast to the émigré intellectuals who dominated the upper ranks of the party.

== Works ==
- Shliapnikov, AG (1989) [1927–29], "Avtobiografiia", in Gambarov, Iu S (ed.), Деятели СССР и октябрьской революции: автобиографии и биографии (Deiateli SSSR i oktiabr'skoi revoliutsii: avtobiografii i biografii) [Figures of the USSR and the October Revolution: autobiography and biography] (in Russian), vol. 3, et al. (eds.), Moscow, pp. 244–51.
- ——— (1982), On the Eve of 1917, Richard Chappell, trans., New York.

== See also ==
- Outline of the Russian Revolution and Civil War
- Bibliography of the Russian Revolution and Civil War
- Bibliography of Stalinism and the Soviet Union
- Index of Old Bolsheviks
- Index of articles related to the Russian Revolution and Civil War

== Sources ==
- Allen, Barbara C. (2015). Alexander Shlyapnikov, 1885–1937: Life of an Old Bolshevik. Leiden: Brill. pp. 84–85. ISBN 978-90-04-24853-3.
- Allen, Barbara C. (October–December 2008). "Aleksandr Shliapnikov's Purge from the Soviet Communist Party in 1933". Cahiers du Monde russe. 49 (4): 559–580. JSTOR 40930682.
- Allen, Barbara C. (2007). "Early dissent within the party: Alexander Shliapnikov and the letter of the twenty-two". The NEP Era: Soviet Russia 1921–1928. 1: 21–54. Archived from the original on February 4, 2022.
