= Alfred Henke =

German politician

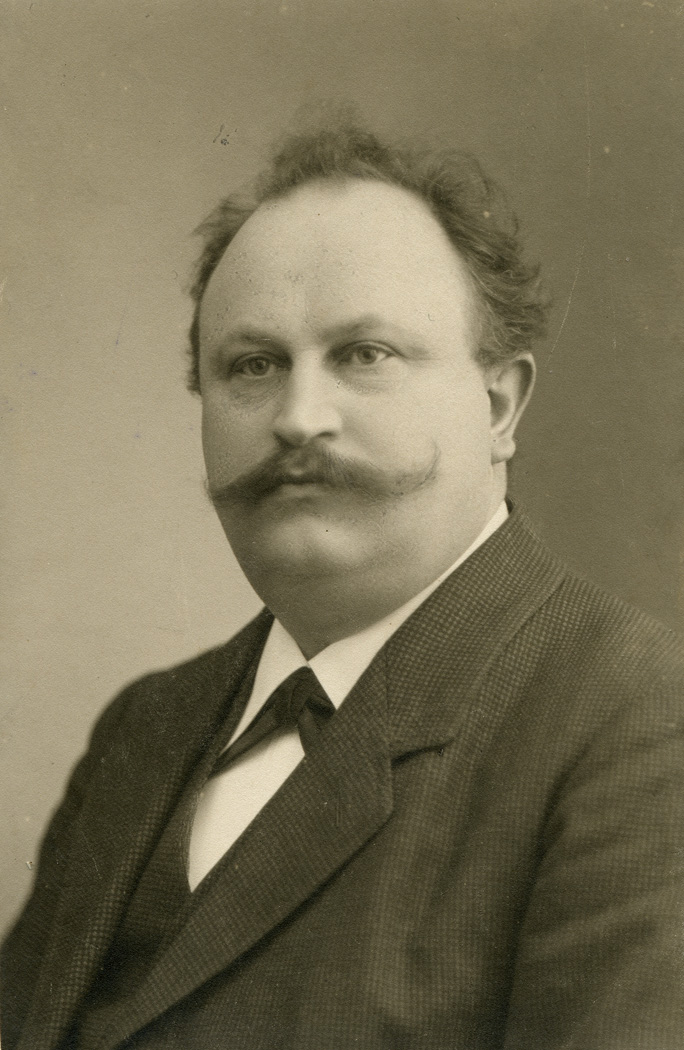
- Henke in 1910

Chairman of the Bremen Soviet Republic
- In office 10 January 1919 – 4 February 1919
- Preceded by: Himself (As Chairman of the Bremen Workers' and Soldiers' Council)
- Succeeded by: Office abolished

Chairman of the Bremen Workers' and Soldiers' Council
- In office 7 November 1918 – 10 January 1919
- Preceded by: Office established
- Succeeded by: Himself (As Chairman of the Council of People's Representatives of the Bremen Soviet Republic)
Parliamentary constituencies
Member of the Reichstag for Weser-Ems
In office 24 June 1920 – 31 July 1932
Preceded by	Constituency established
Succeeded by	Karl Tiedt
Member of the National Assembly for Hamburg
In office 6 February 1919 – 21 May 1920
Preceded by	Office established
Succeeded by	Office abolished
Member of the Reichstag for Bremen
In office 12 January 1912 – 9 November 1918
Preceded by	Hinrich Hormann
Succeeded by	Constituency abolished

Personal details
- Born: 1 March 1868 Hamburg, North German Confederation
- Died: 24 February 1946 (aged 77) Berlin, Allied-occupied Germany
- Party: SPD (before 1917, after 1922); USPD (1917–1922)
- Other political affiliations: SAG (1915–1917)

Alfred Henke (1 March 1868 – 24 February 1946) was a German politician, serving as a member of a number of national and regional parliaments during the early 20th century who played a major role in the establishment of the Bremen Soviet Republic.

== Biography ==
=== Early life and career ===
Born in Altona in Hamburg on 1 March 1868, Henke attended elementary school in Bremen. After graduating he joined his father and trained to be a cigar worker. In 1887 he went to Hamburg to work, before doing military service between 1888 and 1891 with the 6th West Prussian Grenadier Regiment. After leaving the army he again worked in the tobacco industry, joining the Tobacco Workers' Union (German: Tabakarbeitergewerkschaft). He served as a delegate during several trade union congresses. From the mid-1890s and on he was a member of the Social Democratic Party of Germany, acquiring a knowledge of Marxism through self-study. For some time he was district chairman of the SPD in his birthplace of Altona.

From 1900 he also worked as an editor of the newspaper Bremer Bürger-Zeitung, which he would continue to do until 1919. Henke, who married twice and had six children, was a member of the SPD's radical left-wing, and took part in many SPD congresses and international conference. In 1913 at a conference in Jena he supported the policies of Rosa Luxemburg, who he also worked together with at the newspaper – other co-workers included Franz Mehring, Karl Radek, Anton Pannekoek, and Henriette Roland Holst.

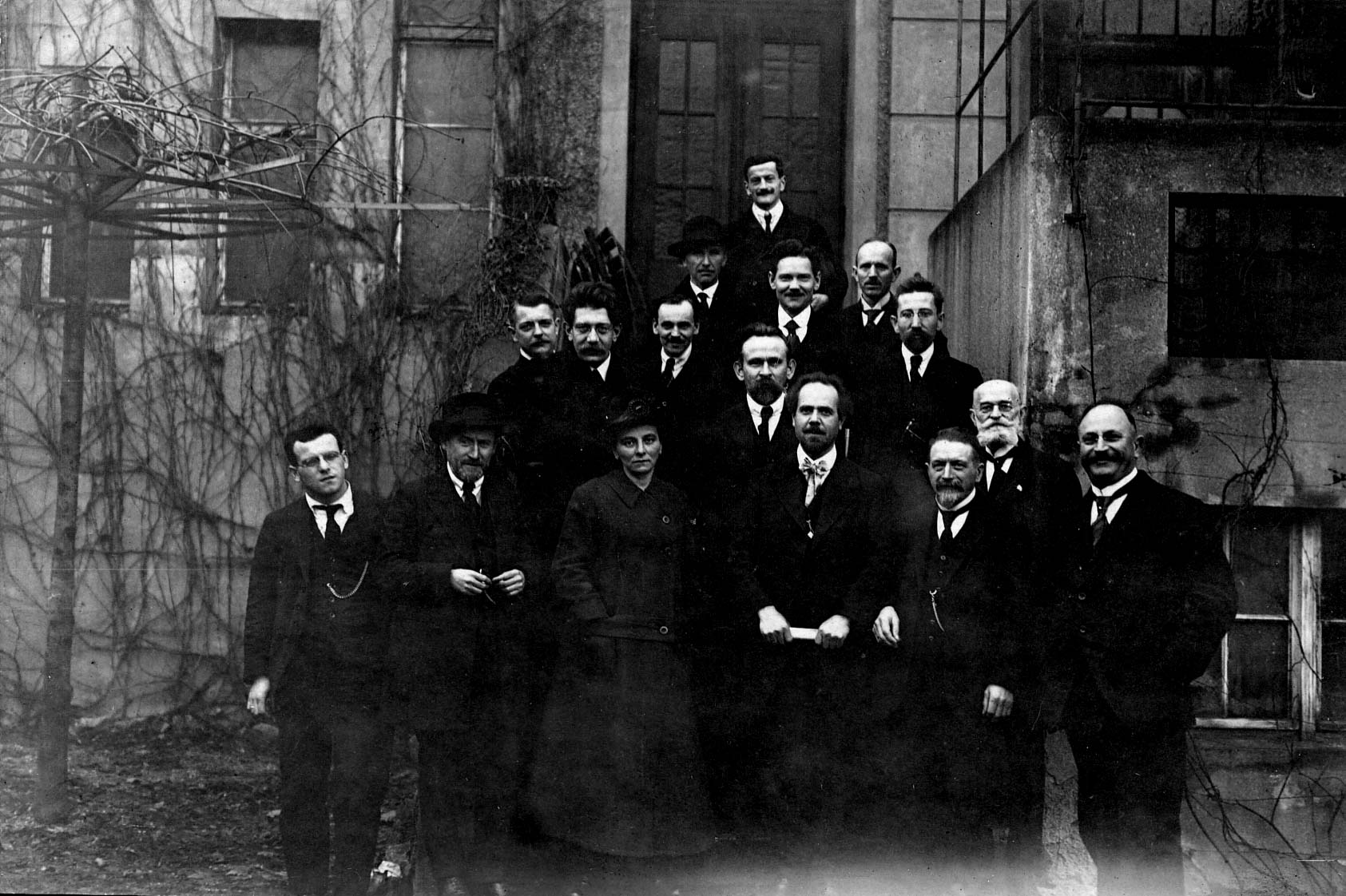
Alfred Henke with the leadership of the USPD, 5 December 1919, first row on the right.

In 1907 he was elected to the Bürgerschaft of Bremen, a post he would keep until 1922. In 1912 he was elected as a SPD deputy in the Reichstag, for the Bremen constituency. After being excluded from the SPD over his opposition to war bonds being issued, he joined the short-lived Social Democratic Working Group (Sozialdemokratische Arbeitsgemeinschaft, SAG). Henke was also excluded from the Bremer Bürger-Zeitung. When internal fragmentation on the issue of the ongoing First World War split the SPD, Henke became one of the first members of the Independent Social Democratic Party of Germany (USPD), and would go on to represent the party politically.

=== Revolution ===
Amid the collapsing war effort, the Kiel mutiny broke out in early November 1918. This triggered a wave of uprisings and revolts throughout the German Empire, the German Revolution of 1918-1919. Bremen, already deeply restive, joined the fray a few days after the sailors mutinied, with a workers' and soldiers' council forming. It was at first led by an action committee, containing three representatives of the radical left (Hans Brodmerkel, Adolf Dannat, Alfred Stockinger) and four representatives of the USPD (Alfred Henke, Adam Frasunkiewicz, Karl Herold, Emil Summer). The following day on 7 November elections supplanted the committee with a few hundred additional members of the council. Henke became Chairman of the committee.

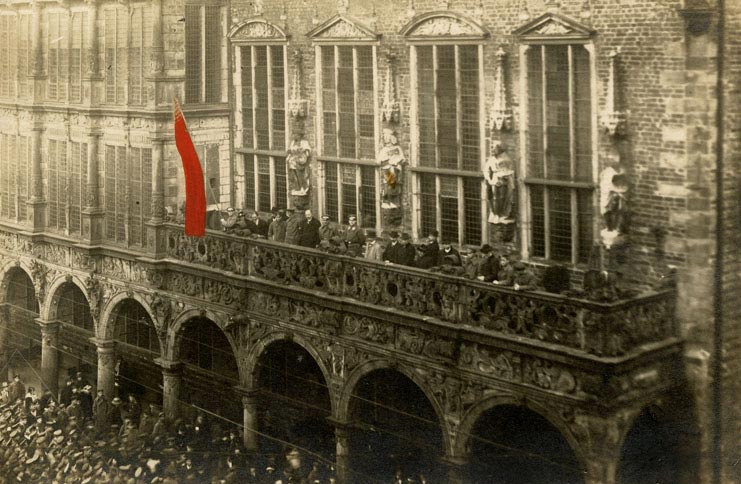
Announcing the reign of the workers' and soldiers' council.

On November 14, Henke – speaking at the Convention Hall of the Bremen Exchange – formally declared the seizure of power by the workers' and soldiers' council, and the dissolution of the Bremen Senate. The next day, speaking from a balcony of the Bremen Town Hall, Henke publicly announced this revolutionary situation.

After a few months of unrest and conflict among the city's faction, the Bremen Soviet Republic was proclaimed on 10 January 1919. With non-revolutionary leftists excluded from the leadership, new radical ideas were imposed, and the workers' and soldiers' council was replaced by a Council of People's Representatives. Henke became its Chairman, together with Frasunkiewicz and the Communists Johann Knief and Karl Jannack, having only reluctantly agreed to support the proclamation of the Soviet Republic after being offered the position.

Concurrently with the proclamation, the Spartacist uprising rose and failed, and soon the Weimar Republic turned its eye on Bremen, where the Independent Social Democrats and the Communist Party of Germany were quickly turning on each other. When troops loyal to the government launched their march on the Soviet Republic, Henke hurried to Berlin to attempt to negotiate a deal with the authorities to prevent this, but failed. The Bremen Soviet Republic was put down by "Division Gerstenberg" and Freikorps Caspari on 4 February.

=== Later life ===
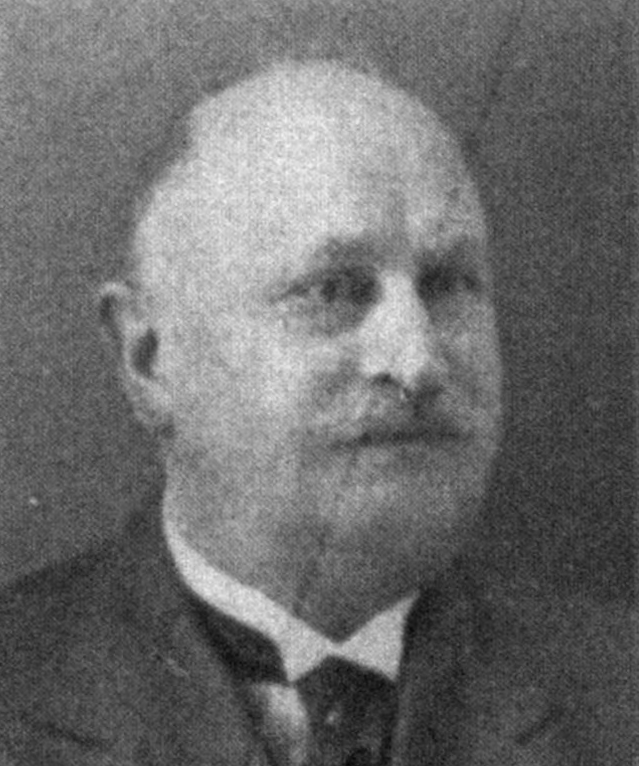
Henke's official Reichstag portrait, 1930

After the failure of the revolution, Henke joined the Weimar National Assembly, serving as a deputy of the USPD. From 1919 to 1922 he was employed by the Bremer Arbeiter-Zeitung. He opposed a merger of the party with the KPD. On 10 July 1919 he argued before the National Assembly in favour of the establishment of "people's courts". The USPD proposal for democratically elected judges, the introduction of which Henke justified with it being the only way to ensure class justice (German: klassenjustiz), was rejected by the other groups. After the November assassination of Hugo Haase he joined the Independent Socialist Group in the National Assembly, serving as its Chairman together with Curt Geyer.

Rejoining the SPD in 1922, he served as a member of the Reichstag for the Social Democrats 1932. He was also a full-time councillor and mayor of Reinickendorf until 1933. When Adolf Hitler and the Nazi Party seized power, he was removed from government service in 1933 and forced to retire. He spent the duration of Nazi Germany's existence in Berlin, where the payment of his pension benefits was denied for political reasons.

Henke died on 24 February 1946, not long after the end of the Second World War. His estate is maintained by the Friedrich Ebert Foundation, and includes correspondence with Karl Radek, Franz Mehring, Anton Pannekoek, Philipp Scheidemann, Karl Kautsky, Clara Zetkin, and Paul Frölich, in addition to manuscripts, records, and collections of letters relating to the SPD during the First World War and the German Revolution.

The street Alfred-Henke-Straße in Bremen has been named for Henke.

== Bibliography ==
- Schumacher, Martin; Lübbe, Katharina; Heinz Schröder, Wilhelm (1994). M.d.R. Die Reichstagsabgeordneten der Weimarer Republik in der Zeit des Nationalsozialismus. Politische Verfolgung, Emigration und Ausbürgerung, 1933–1945. Eine biographische Dokumentation (in German). Düsseldorf: Droste. ISBN 3-7700-5183-1.
- Kuhn, Gabriel (2012). All Power to the Councils!: A Documentary History of the German Revolution of 1918-1919 (in German). PM Press. ISBN 978-1604867374.
