= Walter Hundt =

German artist (1897–1975)

Walter Hundt (born 2 April 1897 in Siegen; died 15 December 1975 in Ohlenstedt, Osterholz-Scharmbeck) was a German painter, graphic artist, lithographer, and farmer who was active in the Worpswede artists commune.

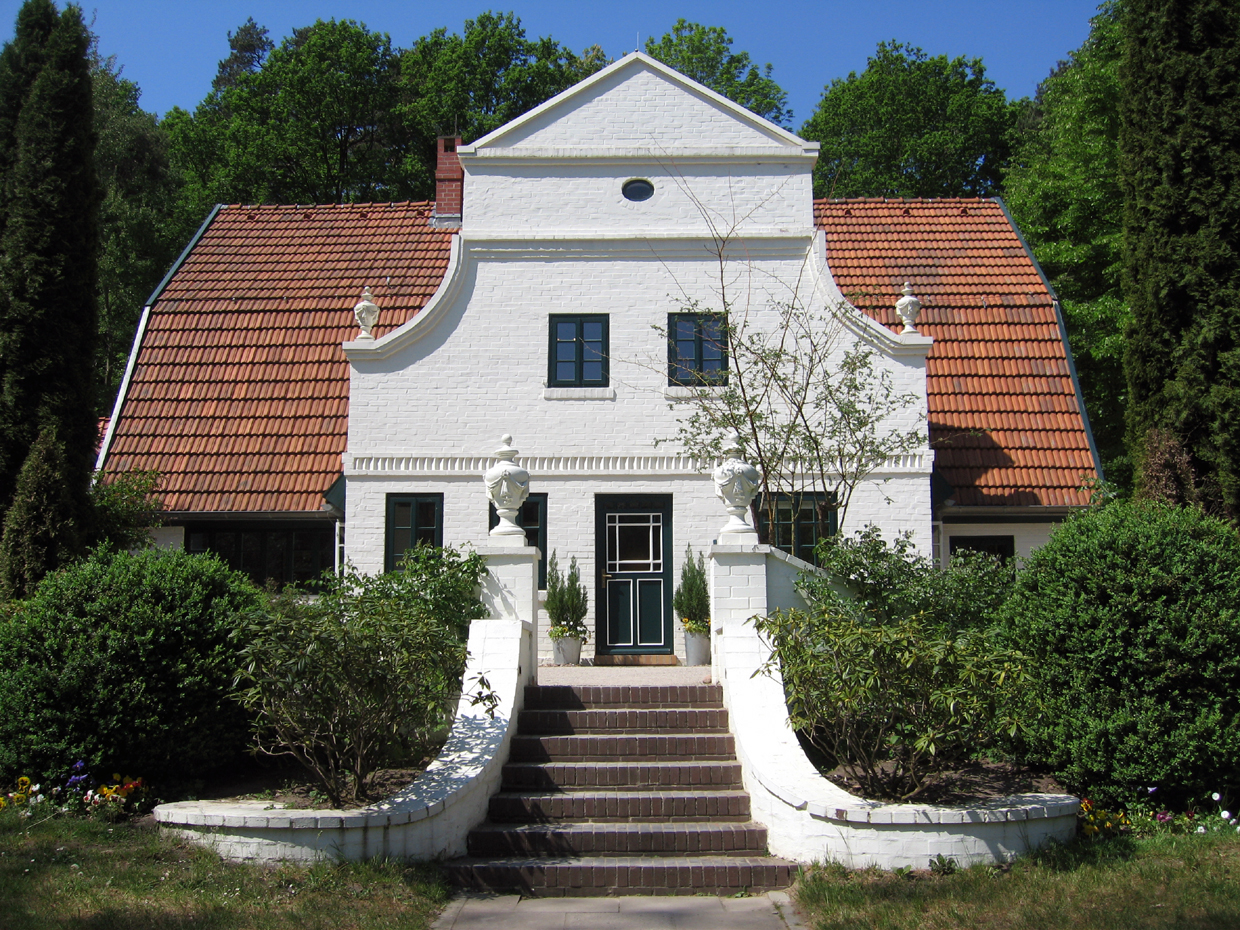
Barkenhoff (Worpswede)

The German artist Heinrich Vogeler was his teacher, about whom he published the (German) book With Heinrich Vogeler in Worpswede in 1981, containing his memoirs.

== Life and work ==
Walter Hundt was born in 1897 in Siegen in Westphalia. As a young man, Walter Hundt came to Worpswede to the Barkenhoff. He became a member of the work school and commune and began to draw and paint. There he met his future wife, Marie Griesbach.

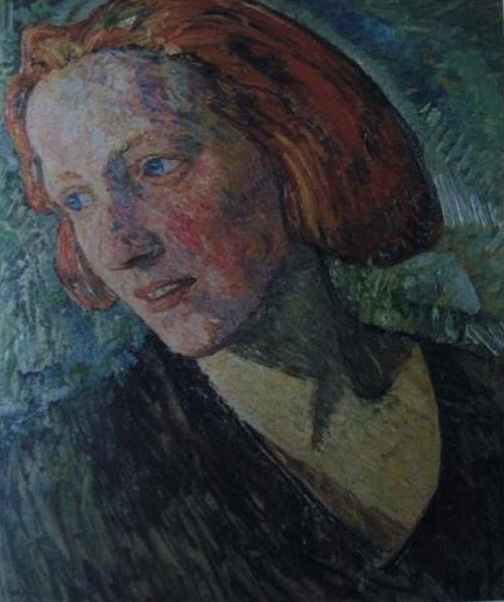
Heinrich Vogeler: The Red Marie, 1919

Walter Hundt and Marie Griesbach ("The Red Marie") married in Worpswede in 1920. They had seven children and from 1924 onward ran their own farm in Ohlenstedt (Osterholz district) according to the principles of anthroposophy. Both were great admirers of Rudolf Steiner, whom they first met in Bremen in the 1920s.

In his essay about Heinrich Vogeler and the Barkenhoff Commune, the German scholar of German studies and literary critic Walter Fähnders described his memories as a “treasure trove for anyone engaging with this period of the Barkenhoff”.

== See also ==
- International Communists of Germany

== Bibliography ==
- Walter Hundt: Bei Heinrich Vogeler in Worpswede. Erinnerungen. Mit einem Nachwort von Bernd Senzig. Worpsweder Verlag, Lilienthal, 1981, ISBN 3922516289
- Birgit Nachtwey: Walter Hundt. 1897-1975. Ölbilder und Pastelle. Worpswede. Worpsweder Verlag. 1995, Reihe: Aus Worpswede 22, ISBN 3892991235
