= Johann Knief =

German teacher, newspaper editor and communist activist

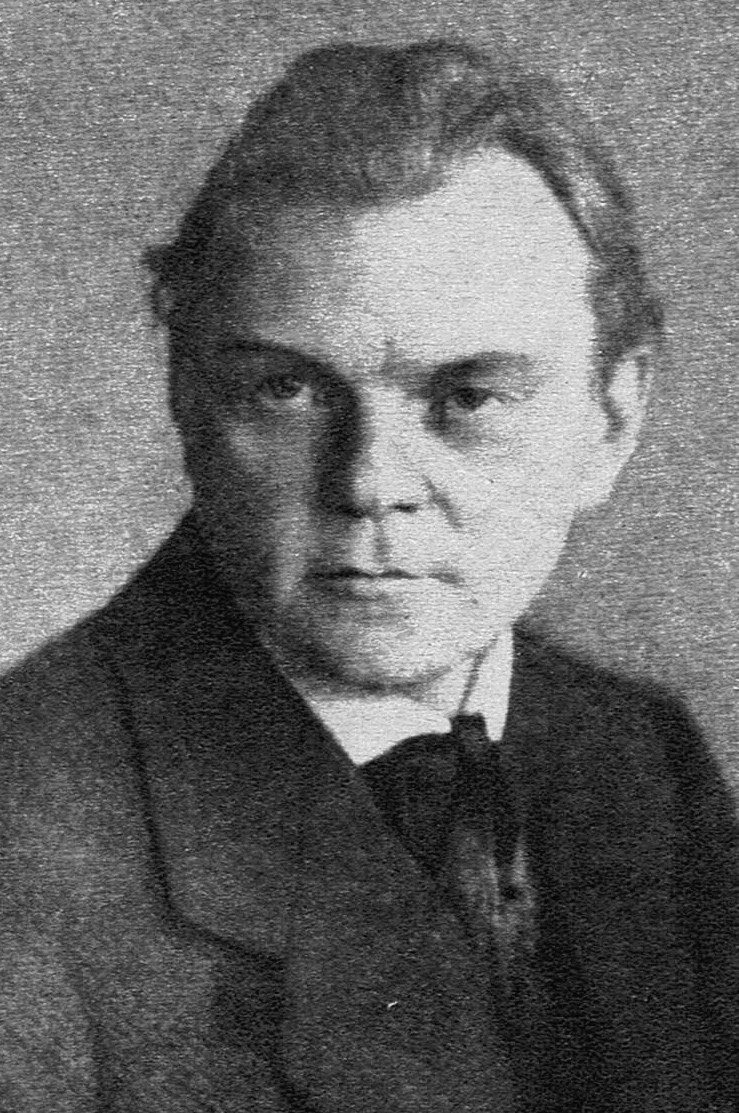
Johann Knief

Johann Knief (20 April 1880, Bremen – 6 April 1919, Bremen) was a German communist newspaper editor, teacher and politician from Bremen.

== Biography ==
Born in 1880, Knief began training to be a primary school teacher in 1901, joining the Social Democratic Party of Germany (SPD) a few years later. He became a spokesperson of the Bremer Linksradikalen (Bremen left-wing radicals). Drafted by the Imperial German Army to fight in the First World War in August 1914, he was discharged after suffering a nervous breakdown on the Western Front. A staunch opponent of the Burgfriedenspolitik supported by a majority of the SPD's parliamentary membership, he welcomed Karl Liebknecht's rejection of war credits in the Reichstag on 2 December 1914. After his recovery he became a noted leader of the left-wing radicals in Bremen by the end of 1915.

From June 1916 to March 1919, he helped publish Arbeiterpolitik, a weekly newspaper that propagated scientific socialism. He engaged in illegal political activities in Berlin and Munich, where he was arrested in January 1918. From February 1918 he was in "protective custody" in Berlin until he was liberated by the revolution in November 1918. Seeing the SPD as in need of organizational reform, he supported the foundation of an independent left party by the Spartacus League.

Under his leadership, the Bremen left-wing radicals formed the Internationale Kommunisten Deutschlands (IKD) in November 1918. Knief declined to attend the founding congress of the Communist Party of Germany (KPD) because it would have required him to vote against the participation of the Communists in the elections to the Weimar National Assembly, as demanded of the delegates by the majority of the IKD. Knief, like Karl Liebknecht and Rosa Luxemburg, was in favour of the KPD's participation in the elections. Karl Radek wrote in his diary that Knief had declined to participate in the founding congress, partly due to political differences in regards to Luxemburg's theory of accumulation, referring to a conversation between Radek and Knief in Berlin before the IKD decided their organizational merger with the Spartacus League on 24 December 1918. Another reason for him not participating was that Knief was seriously ill and physically exhausted.

Despite his serious physical condition, Knief participated in founding the Bremen Soviet Republic in January 1919, and was appointed to its leadership. After the Bremen revolt was put down by the Army and Freikorps Caspari, he briefly went into hiding together with other escaping revolutionaries (among them Heinrich Vogeler) in Worpswede. On 9 March he was designated a deputy of the Communist Party in the Bremer National Assembly, but died from the complications of no less than five operations for appendicitis on 6 April.
