= Theodor Duesterberg =

German officer and politician

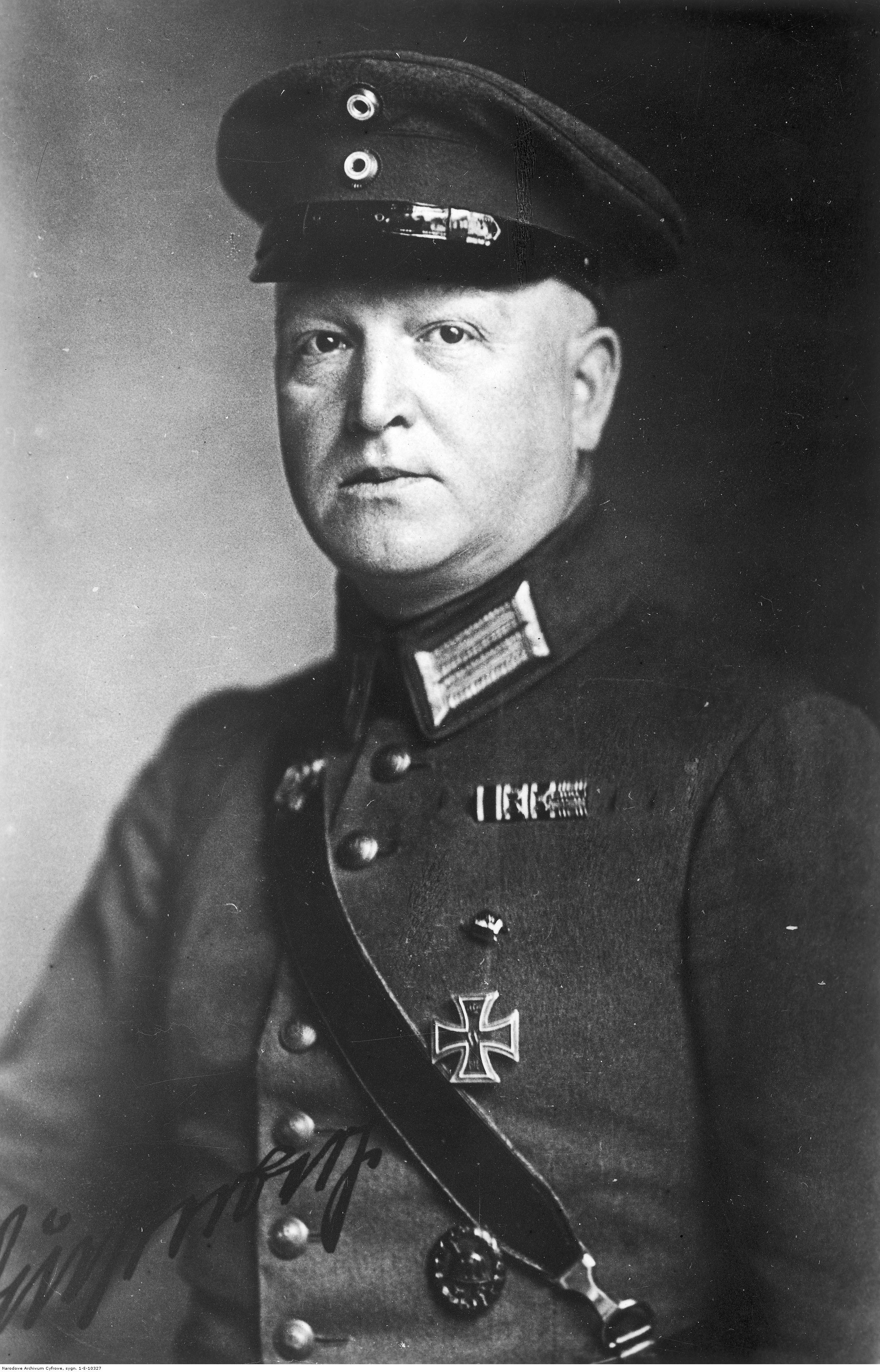
- Duesterberg in uniform, ca. 1932

Deputy Federal Leader of Der Stahlhelm
- In office 9 March 1924 – 21 June 1933

Personal details
- Born: 19 October 1875 Darmstadt, Grand Duchy of Hesse, German Empire
- Died: 4 November 1950 (aged 75) Hamelin, West Germany
- Party: German National People's Party

Military service
- Allegiance: German Empire
- Branch/service: (German Empire) German Army
- Rank: Oberstleutnant a.D.
- Unit: Expedition to China
- Battles/wars: Boxer Rebellion (WIA); World War I
- Awards: Order of the Crown, 4th Class with Swords; Royal House Order of Hohenzollern, Knight's Cross with Swords; Iron Cross 1st Class

Theodor Duesterberg (German pronunciation: [ˈdyːstɐbɛʁk]; 19 October 1875 – 4 November 1950) was a military officer in the Imperial German Army and later leader of the veterans' organisation Der Stahlhelm in Germany prior to the Nazi seizure of power.

== Military service ==
Born the son of an army surgeon in Darmstadt in the Grand Duchy of Hesse, Duesterberg entered the Prussian Army on 22 March 1893 as an officer candidate in Infanterie-Regiment Bremen (1. Hanseatisches) Nr. 75 and was commissioned a Sekondelieutenant on 18 August 1894. In 1900, Duesterberg was assigned to the East Asian Expedition Corps that saw action in China during the Boxer Rebellion, where he was lightly wounded in the right arm. After returning to Germany, he was promoted to Oberleutnant on 27 January 1904 and to Hauptmann on 10 September 1908. He was transferred to the War Ministry in Berlin on 22 March 1914.

With the start of the First World War, Duesterberg returned to the infantry on the Western Front on 16 August 1914. He was promoted to Major on 5 September 1914. and served as a battalion commander in Großherzoglich Mecklenburgisches Grenadier-Regiment Nr. 89 and Reserve-Infanterie-Regiment Nr. 15 and as adjutant of the 13th Infantry Division. He was wounded on 17 November 1914 with Reserve-Infanterie-Regiment Nr. 15 Duesterberg was transferred back to the War Ministry on 18 July 1915, serving there as chief of the section "Allied Armies" until his retirement.

He retired on 3 February 1920 with the Charakter of Oberstleutnant. His retirement was in protest over the Versailles Treaty, which Duesterberg viewed as being extremely unfair to Germany. Duesterberg subsequently decided to enter politics and joined the German National People's Party (DNVP) in 1919.

== Der Stahlhelm ==
After various disagreements with the party leadership, however, Duesterberg left the DNVP in 1923 and joined the nationalistic and pro-monarchy Der Stahlhelm, which largely consisted of ex-servicemen disgruntled with the Weimar Republic. Duesterberg quickly moved through its hierarchy and by 1924 was one of two of its federal leaders (the other being Franz Seldte). Together with General Georg Ludwig Rudolf Maercker, Duesterberg was one of the leaders of the extreme antisemitic faction within Der Stahlhelm who wanted to ban Jews from joining, and expel all of the current Jewish members. In March 1924, Maercker and Duesterberg forced Seldte to adopt the "Aryan clause" and expel all Jews from Der Stahlhelm. The "Aryan clause" of 1924 was later to serve as the inspiration for similar "Aryan clauses" under the Third Reich, and in particular influenced the War Minister, General Werner von Blomberg in his attempts to keep the Wehrmacht "racially clean". Under Duesterberg's leadership, Der Stahlhelm became Germany's largest para-military group.

In the late 1920s, Duesterberg allied Der Stahlhelm with the Nazi Party and other right wing groups. In 1929 Duesterberg campaigned against the Young Plan in the referendum held in November 1929. In 1931, Duesterberg played a key role in forcing the referendum on early elections in Prussia, believing this would help polarize German politics by incorporating the moderate right into the "national" camp. The leader of the German National People's Party, Alfred Hugenberg had starting in 1929 embarked upon a strategy of polarization aimed at the destruction of the political center in Germany, so that the only alternatives were the Marxist parties in the form of the SPD and KPD and the right-wing "national" parties. The failure of the Prussian referendum helped to win Duesterberg away from his strategy of attempting to co-opt the moderate right into the "national" camp, and instead to work for the destruction of the moderate right as Hugenberg advocated. In October 1931, Duesterberg allied Der Stahlhelmm with the Nazis, DNVP, and other right wing groups in order to form the Harzburg Front. The Harzburg Front attempted to bring about the downfall of Heinrich Brüning and the Weimar Republic, but it eventually dissolved due to Adolf Hitler's unwillingness to subordinate the Nazi Party to such a vast right wing coalition on a long-term basis. After the dissolution of the Harzburg Front, Duesterberg continued to lead Der Stahlhelm and maintained the organization's alliance with the DNVP.

== 1932 presidential election ==
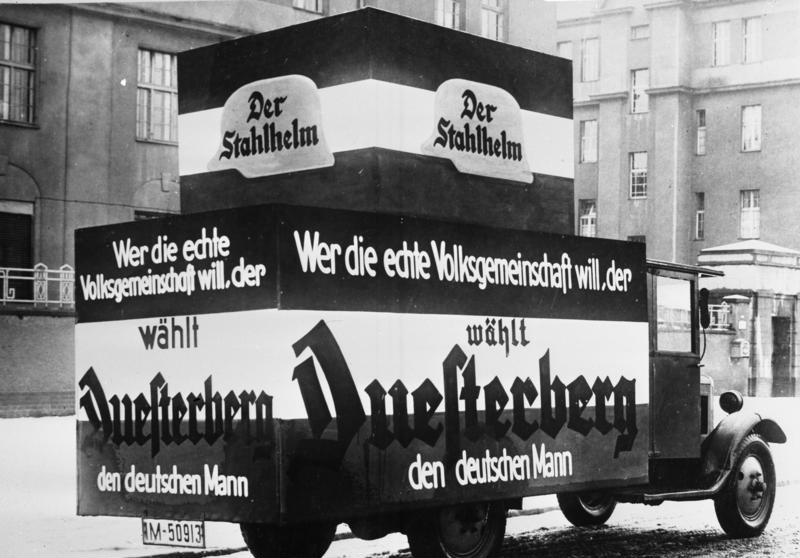
Der Stahlhelm propaganda car in Berlin promoting DNVP nominee Theodor Duesterberg for president of the German Reich in the 1932 election

In 1932, Duesterberg was nominated by Der Stahlhelm and DNVP to run for President of Germany, but the Nazis ultimately destroyed any chance Duesterberg had of gaining mass support from the German people when they revealed he had Jewish ancestry. In April 1932, the deeply anti-Semitic Duesterberg learned for the first time that his grandfather was a Prussian Jewish doctor who converted to Lutheranism in 1818, a revelation that caused Duesterberg to suffer a nervous breakdown and to submit his resignation in shame from Der Stahlhelm. Several of Duesterberg's friends persuaded him not to resign, and in an attempt to stay on as Der Stahlhelm deputy federal leader, he suggested new requirements for every member, namely that:

- That Der Stahlhelm members present notarized copies of church records proving that their parents, grandparents and great-grandparents had no "Jewish blood".
- That Der Stahlhelm members swear on their word of honor that they had no personal, familial or business dealings with Jews in any form or way.
- That Der Stahlhelm members present proof that their ancestors had fought in the "wars of liberation" against Napoleonic France and/or the wars of unification and on what side.
- That Der Stahlhelm members present proof that they had fought in the World War and in what capacity.

The revelation of Duesterberg's Jewish ancestry caused Duesterberg to poll poorly in the first ballot of the election, and he withdrew from the runoff election that followed.

During the 1932 presidential elections, the Nazis went out of their way to taunt Duesterberg for having Jewish ancestry with Joseph Goebbels and Richard Walther Darré being especially vicious in their attacks. Duesterberg was so hurt by Darré's attacks that he challenged him to a duel, a challenge that Darré rejected because it was beneath him to fight a man with "Jewish blood". Duesterberg then took up his dispute with Darré before the court of honor of the Former Officers of the 1st Hanoverian Field Artillery Regiment of Scharnhorst, number 10 to which Darré belonged. Duesterberg argued before the court of honor that Darré should be expelled for engaging in behavior that was unbecoming of a German officer while Darré argued that he had right and duty to subject Duesterberg to anti-Semitic insults. The court of honor ruled in Darré's favor, stating that he was right to insult Duesterberg for having "Jewish blood".

Ironically, Duesterberg was offered a position in Hitler's cabinet when Hitler became Chancellor of Germany in 1933, but Duesterberg flatly refused the proposal. Franz Seldte, however, did enter Hitler's cabinet, which undermined Der Stahlhelm and Duesterberg's authority over the organization, and thus he resigned his leadership position in 1933. In April 1933, Duesterberg was strongly urged to resign from Der Stahlhelm by President Paul von Hindenburg and the Defense Minister, General Werner von Blomberg, who told him that he was now a liability to them with Hitler now chancellor.

== Arrest and later life ==
In 1934, Duesterberg was arrested by the Nazis during the Night of the Long Knives and sent to Dachau concentration camp, where he was briefly interned. After being released, he drifted into obscurity. He was known to have had limited contacts with the anti-Nazi Carl Friedrich Goerdeler in 1943, but Duesterberg ultimately did not play any role in Goerdeler's plots against Hitler. In 1949, Duesterberg wrote The Steel Helmet and Hitler, in which he defended his pre-war political career and Der Stahlhelm and detailed the movement's independence from the Nazi Party and "the insane Jew hatred preached by Hitler". A year later, Duesterberg died in Hamelin.

== Honours and awards ==
- Kingdom of Prussia:
  - Order of the Crown, 4th Class with Swords (28 May 1901)
  - Iron Cross 2nd Class (20 September 1914)
  - Iron Cross 1st Class (10 December 1914)
  - Royal House Order of Hohenzollern, Knight's Cross with Swords (16 October 1917)
  - Officer's Service Decoration Cross for 25 years' service
  - Kaiser Wilhelm I. Memorial Medal (22 March 1897)
- House of Hohenzollern: Royal House Order of Hohenzollern, Commander's Cross
- German Empire:
  - China Commemorative Medal (19 October 1901)
  - Wound Badge in Black (25 June 1918)
- Duchy of Anhalt: Friedrich Cross (30 July 1915)
- Bavaria: Military Merit Order, 4th Class with Crown and Swords (4 June 1917)
- (Bremen (state)) Free and Hanseatic City of Bremen: Hanseatic Cross (10 December 1915)
- Grand Duchy of Hesse:
  - Order of Philip the Magnanimous, Knight 2nd Class with Swords (8 January 1902)
  - General Honor Decoration for Bravery (7 June 1915)
- Principality of Lippe: War Merit Cross (6 June 1915)
- Grand Duchy of Mecklenburg-Schwerin: Military Merit Cross, 2nd Class (15 December 1916)
- Grand Duchy of Mecklenburg-Strelitz: Cross for Distinction in War (15 November 1915)
- Kingdom of Württemberg: Order of the Württemberg Crown, Knight's Cross with Swords (19 January 1917)
- Austria-Hungary: Military Merit Cross, 3rd Class with War Decoration (28 July 1917)
- Kingdom of Bulgaria: Order of Military Merit, Commander's Cross with War Decoration (12 September 1916)
- Democratic Republic of Georgia: Order of Queen Tamara
- Ottoman Empire:
  - Order of Osmanieh, 3rd Class with Sabers (21 January 1918)
  - Order of the Medjidie, 3rd Class with Sabers (10 January 1917)
  - Liakat Medal in Silver with Sabers (15 February 1916)
  - Imtiaz Medal in Silver with Sabers (18 October 1917)
  - War Medal (15 February 1916)
