= Hans Brodmerkel =

German politician and revolutionary activist

Hans Brodmerkel (29 March 1887 – 2 February 1932) was a German politician and revolutionary activist. A co-founder of the Communist Party of Germany (KPD), Brodmerkel was Chairman of the workers' and soldiers' council in the Bremen Soviet Republic, and a member of the Parliament of Bremen.

== Biography ==
Born in Burgebrach (Upper Franconia) in 1887, Brodmerkel moved to Bremen in 1911, becoming a butcher. Since 1912, he was a member of the Association of Butchers. Before 1914, he was a member of the Social Democratic Party of Germany, and during the First World War he was Chairman of the Association of Butchers. As a co-founder of Arbeiterpolitik and a member of the Bremer Linksradikale, the Social Democrats' radical left-wing in Bremen, he was briefly imprisoned in June 1916 for distributing illegal pamphlets.

Brodmerkel was a delegate of the Bremen left-wing radicals during the April 6, 1917 founding conference of the Independent Social Democratic Party of Germany (USPD), in Gotha. He was later member of a commission for the foundation of a left-wing party in July–August 1917 in Berlin, and in 1918 a member of the Internationale Kommunisten Deutschland, a short-lived predecessor to Communist Party of Germany. Soon after, Brodmerkel participated in the founding congress of the KPD (30 December 1918 – 1 January 1919).

When the German Revolution of 1918–19 broke out, Brodmerkel first served as Vice Chairman of the Action Committee founded in a Faulenstraße union hall by four USPD members and three left-wing radicals, among them Brodmerkel. After the election of a hundred and eighty deputies the Action Committee was completed, and a workers' and soldiers' council was formed. Brodmerkel later became its chairman, and participated in the founding of the Bremen Soviet Republic, which was put down by the government shortly afterwards.

After the failure of the revolution, Brodmerkel was elected a deputy of the Bürgerschaft (Parliament) of Bremen in 1923, as a representative of the Communist Party. Clashes ensued within the Bremen branch of the KPD in 1924, after Eugen Eppstein had been designated district manager by the 'ultra-left' in the KPD Berlin headquarters in May. In early 1925, Brodmerkel was expelled from the Communist Party together with Adolf Ehlers and Wilhelm Deisen on charges of being right-wing, but was readmitted by the end of the year. Again expelled in 1929, Brodmerkel joined the Communist Party of Germany (Opposition) instead.

He died in Bremen on 2 February 1932, only months before the July federal elections.

== Bibliography ==
- Lucas, Erhard (1969). Die Sozialdemokratie in Bremen während des Ersten Weltkrieges (Bremer Veröffentlichungen zur Zeitgeschichte, Band 3) (in German). Bremen: C. Schünemann. pp. 191, 196, 229, 271 and 333.
- Weber, Hermann (1969). Der Gründungsparteitag der KPD. Protokoll und Materialien (in German). Frankfurt: Europäische Verlagsanstalt. p. 377.
- Kuckuk, Peter (1986). Bremen in der Deutschen Revolution 1918–1919 (in German). Bremen: Steintor. p. 333. ISBN 3-926028-02-5.
- Herbst, Andreas; Weber, Hermann (2008). Deutsche Kommunisten. Biographisches Handbuch 1918 bis 1945 (in German). Berlin: Karl Dietz Verlag. p. 150. ISBN 978-3-320-02130-6.
