= Infanterie-Regiment Bremen (1. Hanseatisches) Nr. 75 =

Infantry regiment of the Prussian Army

Infanterie-Regiment „Bremen“ (1. Hanseatisches) Nr. 75
- Active: 1866 - 1919
- Country: Prussia; German Empire; Bremen
- Allegiance: Prussian Army; Imperial German Army
- Branch: Infantry
- Type: Regiment
- Garrison/HQ: Bremen (1867-1919); Harburg (1866-1893); Stade (1866-1919)
- Engagements: Franco-Prussian War; World War I

Infanterie-Regiment Bremen (1. Hanseatisches) Nr. 75 was an active infantry regiment in the Prussian Army (1866–1871) and the Imperial German Army (1871–1918).

== History ==
By an A.K.O. (Allerhöchste Kabinettsorder) dated 27 September 1866, which is considered the official foundation day of the regiment, a new Prussian regiment was formed after the Austro-Prussian War from companies of the Pomeranian Regiments No. 1, 3, 5 and 7 in Stettin on 3 November 1866. It was formed into a musketeer battalion in Harburg and a fusilier battalion in Stade and called Infanterie-Regiment Nr. 75.

As a result of the military convention between the Kingdom of Prussia and the Free and Hanseatic City of Bremen on 27 June 1867, the "Bremen" Fusilier Battalion, founded in 1813, was incorporated in the army of the North German Confederation. From this point on, this battalion formed the 1st (musketeer) battalion of the regiment. The regiment was renamed to 1. Hanseatisches Infanterie-Regiment Nr. 75. After 1893, both musketeer battalions were stationed in Bremen, while the fusilier battalion remained in Stade.

== Franco-Prussian War ==
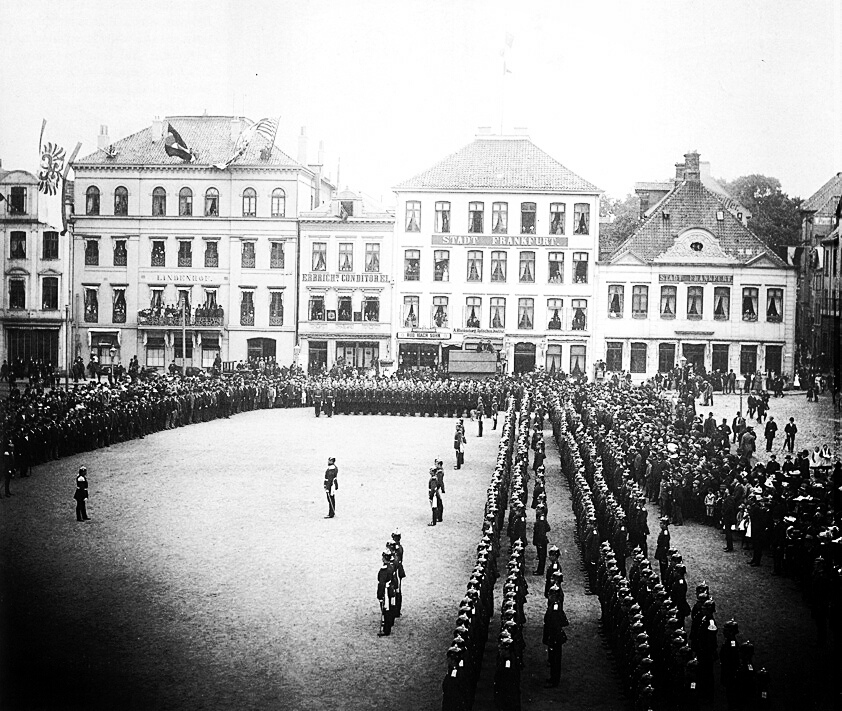
Regimental muster in Bremen in 1891 marking the 25th anniversary of Infanterie-Regiment Bremen.

In the Franco-Prussian War, the regiment fought as part of the 17th Infantry Division in the battles of Noisseville, Loigny-Poupry, Orléans, Beaugency and Le Mans, and in the sieges of Metz and Paris. During this war, the regiment suffered a total of 26 officer casualties, including one medical officer (5 killed in action, 2 died illness, 19 wounded), as well as 534 casualties among non-commissioned officers and men (110 killed in action, 54 died of illness, 16 missing and 354 wounded). Four officers were awarded the Iron Cross 1st Class. The Iron Cross 2nd Class was awarded 169 times.

== Interwar period ==
The regiment remained part of the peacetime 17th Division. It was renamed from the 1. Hanseatisches Infanterie-Regiment Nr. 75 to Infanterie-Regiment Bremen (1. Hanseatisches) Nr. 75 on 5 September 1904.

== First World War ==
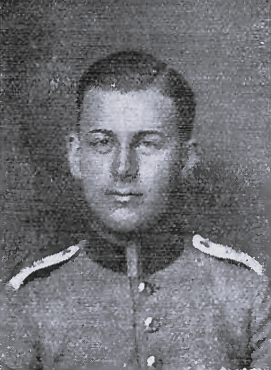
Johannes Wilhelm Sievers Sievert († June 1918 Moyenneville) as a Fähnrich in the regiment.

The regiment spent the entirety of World War I, except for some temporary detachments, as part of the 17th Infantry Division on the Western Front. An estimated 19,735 men served in the active regiment over the course of the war. Approximately 3,600 members of the regiment died during the conflict.

Two officers of the regiment, Oberstleutnant Wilhelm Hagedorn and Major Walter Caspari, were decorated with the Pour le Mérite, Prussia's highest military honor for officers. Five non-commissioned officers were decorated with the Military Merit Cross, Prussia's highest military honor for non-commissioned officers and other ranks. Sixteen officers, including Hagedorn and Caspari, were decorated with the Knight's Cross of the Royal House Order of Hohenzollern with Swords. The Iron Cross 1st Class was awarded to 79 officers and 105 non-commissioned officers and other ranks.

== Legacy ==
Several years after the war, former members of the regiment formed a veterans organization Kameradschaftsbund der Fünfundsiebziger (from 1939 to 1943: Traditionsverband des Ehem. Infant.-Reg. "Bremen" (1. Hans.) Nr. 75) which published a newsletter, Kameradschaftsbund der 75er. There was also a separate officers association. Following the war, the regiment was perpetuated in the Reichswehr by 1. Kompanie/16. Infanterie-Regiment (6. Division, based in Münster).

== Commanders ==
Rank	Name	Dates
Oberst	Friedrich von Buddenbrock	30 October 1866 to 17 July 1870
Oberst	Wilhelm von der Osten	18 July 1870 to 11 December 1872
Oberst	Ludwig von Knobloch	12 December 1872 to 16 April 1879
Oberstleutnant	Timon von Rauchhaupt	17 April to 10 June 1879 (tasked with the leadership)
Oberst	Timon von Rauchhaupt	11 June 1879 to 10 November 1884
Oberst	Gustav von der Lancken	11 November 1884 to 9 August 1888
Oberstleutnant	Fedor von Brodowski	10 August to 12 November 1888 (tasked with the leadership)
Oberst	Fedor von Brodowski	13 November 1888 to 15 June 1891
Oberst	Franz Xaver von Garnier	16 June 1891 to 12 September 1895
Oberst	Karl von Barton genannt von Stedman	13 May 1895 to 19 July 1898
Oberst	Wilhelm von Bötticher	20 July 1898 to 21 July 1900
Oberst	Hugo Sasse	22 July 1900 to 17 April 1903
Oberst	Paul Albrecht	18 April 1903 to 26 January 1908
Oberst	Richard von Webern	27 January 1908 to 20 April 1911
Oberst	Max Woide	21. April 1911 to 21 March 1914
Oberst	Eugen Jäger	22 March to 20 September 1914
Oberstleutnant	Georg Bruhn	21 September 1914 to 31 May 1915
Oberst	Otto von Trautmann	1 June to 28 October 1915
Major	Wilhelm Hagedorn	29 October 1915 to 19 January 1919
Oberst	Karl Brentano	20 January 1919 to dissolution

== Notable members ==
- Max von Bahrfeldt
- Kurt Blome
- Walter Caspari
- Theodor Duesterberg
- Henrich Focke
- Fritz Fullriede
- Helmuth Groscurth
- Albert Henze
- Kurt Heyser
- August Wellm

== See also ==
- List of Imperial German infantry regiments

== Sources ==
- anon. Bremer Verlustliste. Bremen: L. Mack, 1871.
- anon. Kurze Darstellung der Geschichte des Infanterie-Regiments Bremen (1. Hanseatischen) Nr. 75 von 1866 bis 1908. Berlin: Bajanz & Studer, 1908.
- anon. Infanterie-Regiment Bremen im Felde 1914–1918. Bremen: F. Leuwer, 1919.
- Caspari, Walter. Infanterie-Regiment "Bremen" (1. Hanseatisches) Nr 75: Die letzten Großkampftage am 29., 30., 31. Okt. u. 1. Nov. 1918 Bremen: F. Leuwer, [1921].
- Caspari, Walter. Infanterie-Regiment "Bremen" (1. Hanseatisches) Nr 75: Die Kämpfe im Oktober 1918 Bremen: C. Schünemann, [1923].
- Gottschling, G. R. L. Geschichte des 1. hanseatischen Infanterie-Regiments Nr. 75: von seiner Gründg im J. 1866 bis zum Ende d. dt.-franz. Krieges 1870/71. Berlin: Mittler, 1886.
- Zipfel, Ernst. Geschichte des Infanterie-Regiments Bremen (1. Hanseatisches) Nr. 75. Bremen: Hauschild, 1934.
