= Walter Caspari =

German officer (1877–1962)

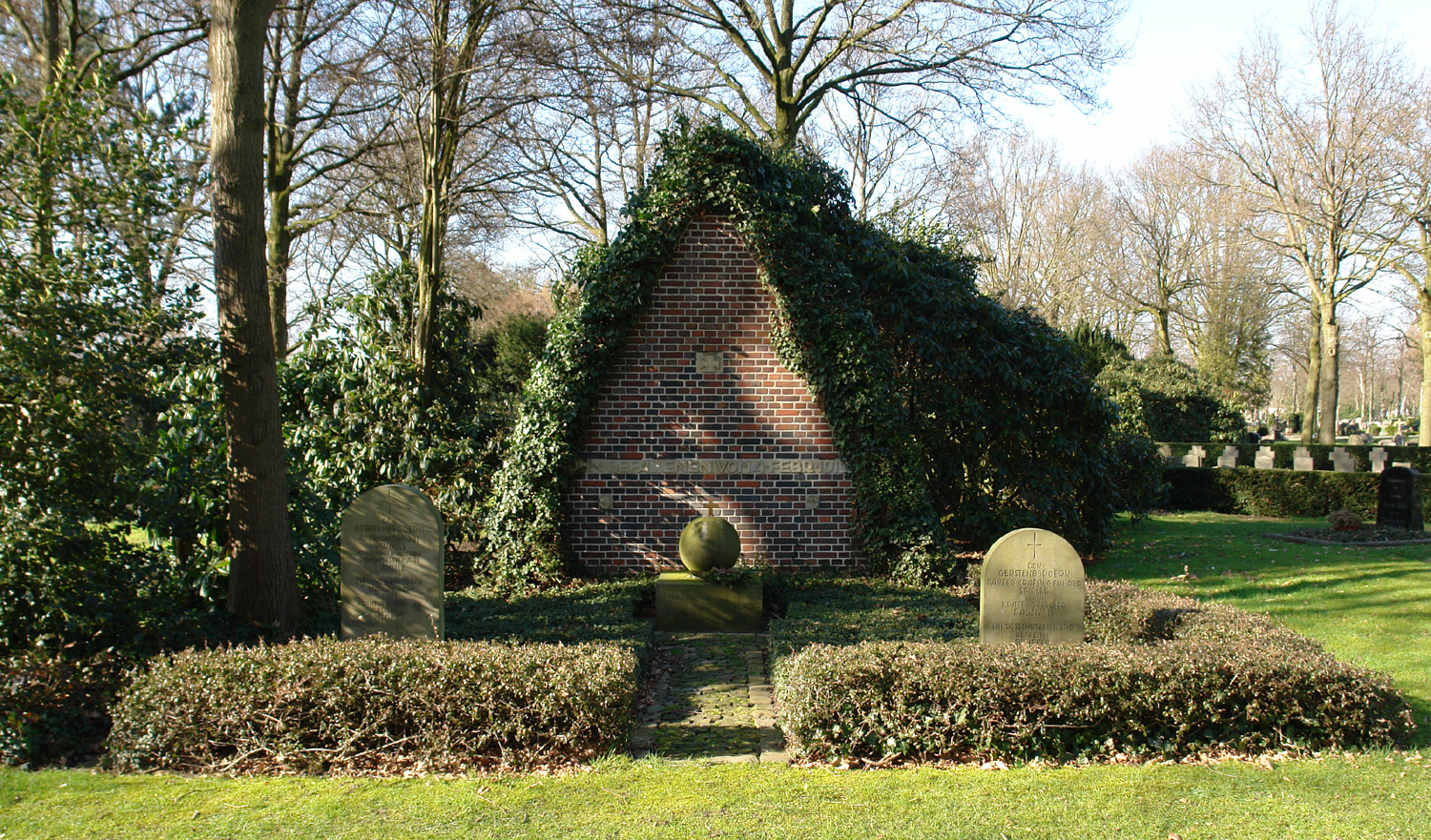
Monument in Bremen to the dead of, among others, Freikorps Caspari.

Karl Georg Erwin Walter Caspari (26 July 1877 – 29 July 1962) was a German military officer, policeman, and leader of a Freikorps militia unit named after him.

== Life ==
Caspari was the son of Albrecht Caspari (1845–1927), a member of the Privy Council of Justice, and Teo Caspari, née Barckhausen. Born in Detmold in 1877, Caspari became a cadet of the Prussian Army after graduating high school in 1896, joining the Infanterie-Regiment von Wittich (3. Kurhessisches) Nr. 83 of the 22nd Division. Between 1900 and 1901 he served in the 5th East Asian Infantry Regiment, fighting in the Boxer Rebellion in China. In 1902, after returning to Germany, he joined the Infanterie-Regiment Bremen (1. Hanseatisches) Nr. 75. serving in the city of Bremen. During the First World War Caspari served first as a company commander, later commanding a battalion. Promoted to Major, he was awarded the Pour le Mérite, the Kingdom of Prussia's highest order of merit, on 21 April 1918, a few months prior to the war's end.

On 1 January 1919 he returned to Bremen, and participated in the emerging German Revolution of 1918–19. In January a workers' and soldiers' council was formed in Bremen, and soon after the Bremen Soviet Republic was declared. Many of the regiment's troops were sympathetic to the revolutionaries, and after some initial negotiations the regiment was allowed to retain their weapons, and participate in policing, as well as joining the council. Soon after, the troops forced armed workers to surrender their weapons. Despite this, the regiment was allowed to continue their participation, although Caspari was forced to relinquish his seat under pressure from the Communists.

After the suppression of the Spartacist uprising, Colonel Wilhelm Gerstenberg organized a military intervention of the Reichswehr against the Bremen Soviet Republic, "Division Gerstenberg". The unit was authorized by Gustav Noske to crush the rebellion. On their march to Bremen, Division Gerstenberg were joined by "Freikorps Caspari", an anti-communist paramilitary formed by Walter Caspari. It consisted of 600 volunteers. Together the two forces attacked Bremen on February 4 at 10:15, and within short they had eliminated the opposition, with several dozen casualties.

In the years after the failed revolution, Caspari became a police officer, eventually becoming head of the police in Bremen, in 1922. Initially well considered by the Nazi Party, he later opposed the unconstitutional seizure of power by the Nazis, and was forced to resign on 10 April 1933. He was promoted to Police General as compensation. His forced resignation was criticized by many, including Paul von Lettow-Vorbeck.

During the Second World War Caspari, a Colonel, was commander of the Infanterie-Ersatz-Regiments 269 in Delmenhorst. On 31 July 1942 the aged officer's mobilization order was repealed. After the war he returned to Bremen, where he died in 1962. A now defunct barracks in Delmenhorst is named after Caspari, and there have been several monuments erected to the memory of the Freikorps Caspari. One memorial was put up on a cemetery in Bremen already in the 1920s, another - the statue Der Jüngling by Herbert Kubica - was erected in 1936. The statue was denazified in the years after the war, and purged of any mention of the Freikorps Caspari or Division Gerstenberg.

== Bibliography ==
- Heyser, Kurt (1969). Bremische Biographie 1912–1962 (in German). Bremen: Hauschild. pp. 90–92.
- Schwarzwälder, Herbert (2002). Das Große Bremen-Lexikon (in German). Bremen: Edition Temmen. ISBN 3-86108-616-6.
- Dermot, Bradley; Schulz, Andreas; Wegmann, Günter (2003). Die Generale der Waffen-SS und der Polizei. Die militärischen Werdegänge der Generale, sowie der Ärzte, Veterinäre, Intendanten, Richter und Ministerialbeamten im Generalsrang. Band 1: Abraham–Gutenberger (in German). Bissendorf: Biblio Verlag. pp. 183–184. ISBN 3-7648-2373-9.
