= Bremen Soviet Republic =

Soviet republic in Germany in 1919

Bremen Soviet Republic Bremer Räterepublik (German)
- 1919
- Flag

- Status: Unrecognized state
- Capital: Bremen
- Common languages: German
- Government: Soviet republic
- Chairman/President
  - 1919: Alfred Henke
- Legislature: Bremen Workers' and Soldiers' Council
- Historical era: Weimar Republic
  - Established: 10 January 1919
  - Disestablished: 4 February 1919
- Currency: "Papiermark" (ℳ)
Preceded by	Succeeded by
German Empire; Free Hanseatic City of Bremen	Weimar Republic; Free Hanseatic City of Bremen
- Today part of: Germany

The Bremen Soviet Republic, also translated as the Bremen Council Republic (German: Bremer Räterepublik), was an unrecognised revolutionary state in Germany formed during the German revolution of 1918–1919 in the immediate aftermath of the First World War. Although not formally declared until 10 January 1919, the regime it represented presided in the industrial port city of Bremen from 14 November 1918 until its suppression on 4 February 1919 by army and irregular forces engaged by the provisional government in Berlin.

On 10 November 1918, a Workers' and Soldier's Council deposed the Senate of Bremen which had governed the Free Hansa City of Bremen (Freie Hansestadt Bremen) under the German Empire. After offering assurances for private property and soliciting the cooperation of the existing administrative bureaucracy, on 6 January 1919 the Council called an election limited to members of the left-wing parties and aligned trade unions: the Majority Social Democrats (MSPD), the Independent Social Democrats (USPD), and the newly formed Communist Party of Germany (KPD). On 10 January, the USPD-KPD majority declared the Bremer Räterepublik.

The Soviet Republic was riven by disagreement over the nature of its mandate, the management of a developing financial and supply crisis, and the accommodation of national parliamentary elections. When faced with the determination of the new MSPD-led national government to enforce its authority, it was unable to agree on a common negotiating position. On 4 February 1919, a combination of regular army troops and irregular Freikorps occupied the city, breaking a disorganised resistance and putting an end to the Republic.

== Establishment ==
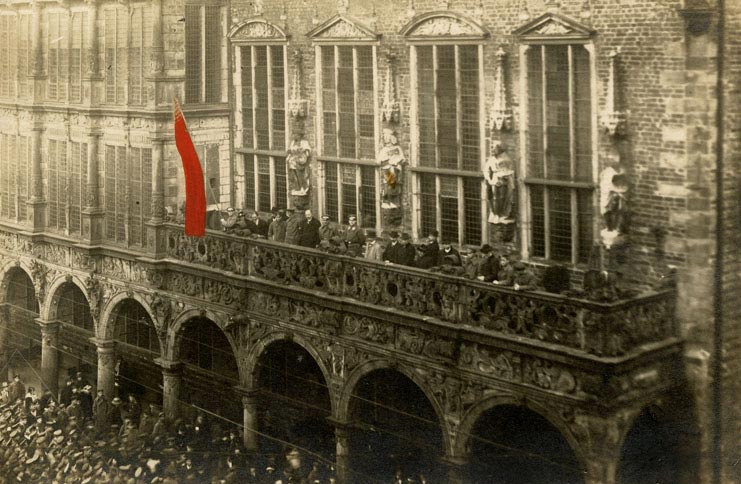
Declaration of the Bremen Workers' and Soldiers' Council from Bremen City Hall, 15 November 1918.

As an international port and industrial centre, Bremen had a strong democratic-left tradition. In the last elections to the Imperial Reichstag in January 1912, the Social Democrats (SPD) secured over half the vote, 53.4%. Left Liberals (Linksliberale) took another 41.4%. Just 5.1% went to the Conservatives. The traditional prerogatives of the city's principal employers and traders were nevertheless preserved by the eight-class franchise for the city's elected Bürgerschaft and in lifelong appointments to the executive Senate. In the wake of the deprivations and reverses of the Great War, the legitimacy of such oligarchic arrangements in the city-state's government collapsed, as did those of the imperial regime in Berlin. Striking workers defied de facto martial law, and soldiers transferred their allegiance from officers to their own elected councils.

Around noon on 6 November 1918, thousands of shipyard, dock and factory workers demonstrated on the marketplace in front of the Bremen City Hall. A soldiers' council formed among locally stationed army units, and a delegation of sailors from Kiel sought their support in resisting the reimposition of military command. After deliberations between the various delegations and political factions present, Adam Frasunkiewicz of the Independent Social Democrats (a left-wing anti-war splinter from SPD) announced that workers would meet with the soldiers in a city-wide council.

Following elections on 7 November, 180 workplace delegates joined 30 soldiers in a combined Workers’ and Soldiers’ Council. They formed an executive Action Committee of initially 15 members but extended to 21 to include representatives of the trade unions and the MSPD, who were seen to bring needed administrative expertise. Alfred Henke of the USPD was elected chair of the committee. His deputy was Hans Brodmerkel of the Left Radicals (Linksradikale), another SPD splinter group founded by Johann Knief.

Early on 15 November, Henke appeared with delegates on the balcony of the City Hall and declared the Council "the representative of the entire people". A red flag was hoisted. His declaration made no promise of sudden or radical change. Citizens were assured that private property would be protected and plunderers summarily dealt with. Now that "democracy had been victorious", it called on members of the old government to cooperate with the new powers. Appearing to respect the Council as legislative successor to the Bürgerschaft, the Senate continued to direct the administrative bureaucracy more or less as before.

In the council elections of 6 January, the MSPD sought to get around the restriction of the franchise to members of the three left parties by opening its ranks to large numbers of previously unaligned workers and civil servants. With 104 mandates, the SPD emerged the largest party. But combining their delegates, the Communists with 60 and the USPD with 59 were able to seize the initiative. On 10 January, with the declaration of the Bremen Soviet Republic, they cut ties with the MSPD and, in the city administration, with the remaining holdovers from the Senate.

== Deliberations and division ==
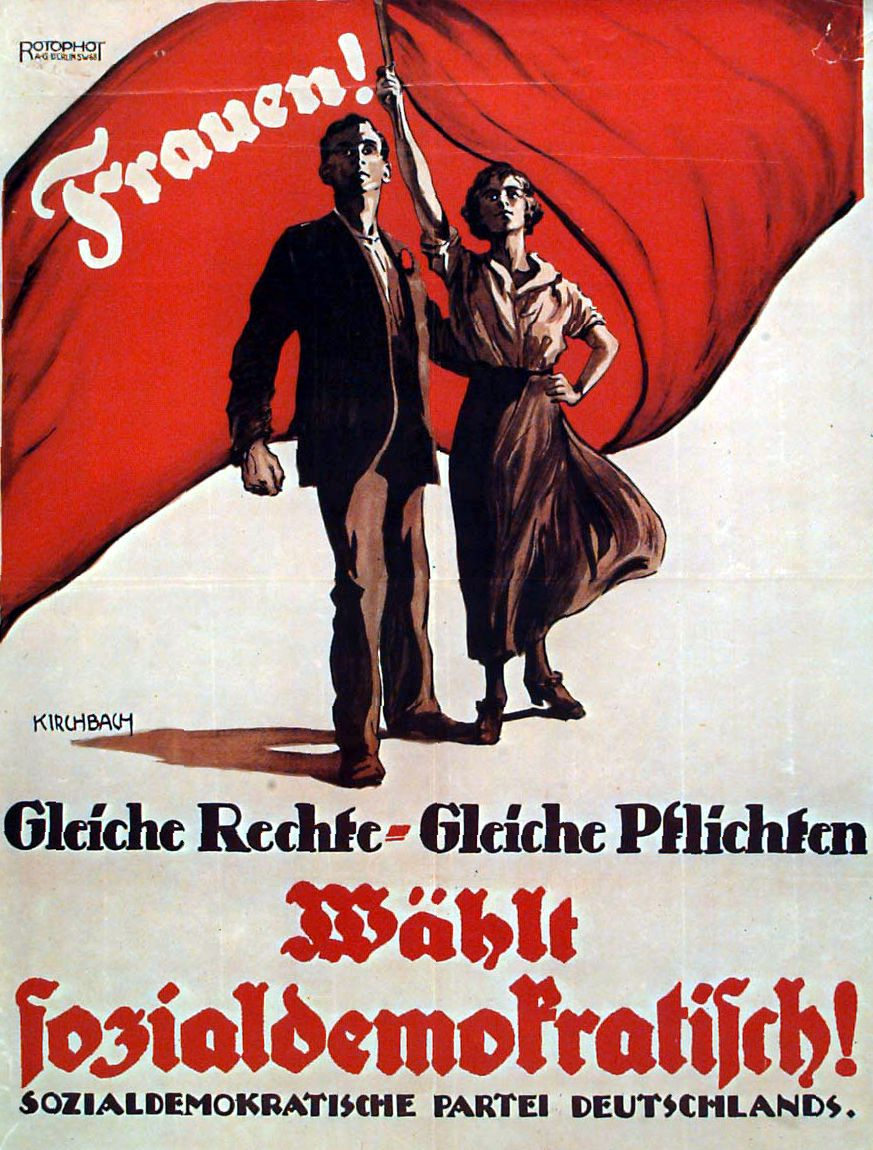
SPD 1919 election poster celebrates universal adult suffrage: "Women! Same Rights, Same Duties".

=== Nature of the revolutionary mandate ===
The Council agreed on no single vision as to how it should operate or contribute to the anticipated socialist reconstruction. The Communists insisted on the dictatorship of the proletariat but were divided as to what this might mean. Consistent with what were later understood as Leninist or Bolshevik principles, one faction, forming around Johann Knief and his journal Arbeiterpolitik as the International Communists of Germany (IKD), defended the party as the leading organisational form. Another, invoking the council communist ideas of Antonie Pannekoek and Karl Radek (both of whom had taught in the city's Social Democratic party school), regarded both parties and trade unions as structures ultimately hostile to the democratic exercise of labour's power. The USPD was internally divided over the relation between workplace delegation and parliamentary representation, but generally saw the councils as transitional institutions that would facilitate the socialisation of the economy.

In debating the questions of whether to open council elections to non-party workers and middle-class employees, and on whether to cooperate in the elections for a constituent National Assembly scheduled for 19 January, the MSPD had been alone in expressing confidence in the broadest franchise. In opposition to the MSPD, Henke went so far as to suggest that the prospect of a bourgeois parliamentary, as opposed to proletarian revolutionary, majority had been enhanced by the extension of the national franchise to women. Referring to their political immaturity, he suggested that more preparatory work was required before according women an equal voice.

Women delegates, of which there were just three on the Council, protested the compromising of previous socialist commitments to gender equality. They noted that the unemployment benefits introduced by the Council paid women at only one third the rate that they did for men, and that as members of the Council their own compensation was a third less than that of their male colleagues. Henke's mistrust of women may have proved self-fulfilling. Disappointed in the Council, women struggling for recognition were drawn to the electoral equality accepted by the parties endorsing the National Assembly.

=== Exclusion of the Majority Social Democrats ===
On 19 November 1918, a resolution calling on workers' and soldiers' councils to convene a national convention in opposition to the National Assembly was carried in the Council by a majority of 116 votes to 23. The Left Radicals then called a mass meeting on 22 November, which passed a resolution demanding the disarmament both of the middle-class and the Majority Social Democrats and their exclusion from the councils. The resolution was the basis for the founding of the Knief's IKD the following day. On the same day, however, the council of the Bremen garrison which, even in the absence of commissioned officers, represented a broad social cross-section, decided against the arming of a workers' militia (a "Red Guard"). If the arms depots were threatened, they would themselves impose martial law. Supporting the MSPD, they also prevented the USPD and IKD from seizing exclusive editorial control of the city's principal newspaper, the Bremer Bürger-Zeitung.

The decisive break with the Majority Social Democrats was delayed until the new Council elections and the subsequent declaration of the Bremen Soviet Republic. Even then, the moderating influence of the soldiers' delegates was sufficient when combined with the USPD to produce a small majority on the Council in favour of accommodating the National Assembly elections.

== Political defeat and isolation ==
The legitimacy of the council government received a significant blow when the results of the 19 January election to the Weimar National Assembly were tabulated. In Bremen, the MSPD received 42% of the votes, the centrist German Democratic Party (DDP) 33.5%, the USPD 18.2%, and all other parties (the Communists maintained their boycott) remained under 5%.

Meanwhile, tensions between workers' and soldiers' delegates over the distribution of arms had resulted in near civil war. On 14 January, soldiers from the Bremen garrison occupied bridges, the market square and the main station. Marines then advanced on the shipyards, whose workforce was a mainstay of the communists. Gunfire was exchanged before the Marines were persuaded to retire.

There was also a pending crisis of supply as the city exhausted its available funds. As a condition for further loans, the banks insisted not only on the restoration of the former financial administration, but also on free elections to a Bremen constituent assembly.

On 18 January, against Communist opposition, the Workers' and Soldiers' Council agreed to schedule popular elections for a new legislative body, a Bremen constitutional assembly for 9 March. The Independent Social Democrats overcame the resistance of the Communists by matching their threat to resign from the Council. A withdrawal of their delegates would have dissolved the Bremen Soviet Republic with immediate effect. With armed supporters occupying a number of their offices, some left-wing members of the KPD tried to extort loans from the banks, but the action quickly collapsed, as did the attempt at a city-wide strike.

The Bremen Communists, reorganised with the Spartakusbund as the KPD at the national level, supported an uprising in Berlin against the MSPD-led regime. When the Spartacist uprising failed on 12 January, there no longer seemed any near-term prospect of a council or "soviet" alternative to the National Assembly. The Bremen Soviet Republic was isolated, and with the agreement to hold city elections, internally compromised.

== Suppression ==
Even before the proclamation of the Soviet Republic, representatives of Bremen's business community had sought Berlin's military intervention. The necessary forces were now at hand. A division of 3,000 regular troops gathered at Verden on 29 January 1919 under Colonel Wilhelm Gerstenberg. There were also around 600 volunteers who had joined forces as a Freikorps under Major Walter Caspari. Negotiations were attempted, with the council government being asked to rearm Bremen's returning 75th Infantry Regiment and to entrust it with internal security. When this was ignored, the new Reich defence minister, Gustav Noske (MSPD), gave the order to advance on the city.

The council government had no concrete defence plans. It mobilised about 1,000 defenders, of whom most had no combat experience. They were reinforced by 250 sailors from Cuxhaven, few of whom would have been familiar with the city. There were statements of solidarity from the workers' and soldiers' councils in Bremerhaven, Oldenburg and Hamburg, but no other timely assistance. A few hundred volunteers who had gathered in Hamburg under Ernst Thälmann never reached Bremen; and around 150 volunteers from Bremerhaven arrived only after the fighting had ended.

The severest clashes, involving the deployment of light artillery and two tanks (one of which was destroyed), occurred in the working class districts Walle and Gröpelingen. The 1st Hanseatic Infantry Regiment No. 75 remained in barracks under a white flag signalling its neutrality. Twenty-four government troops and twenty-eight armed workers were killed, along with twenty-nine civilians.

== Aftermath ==
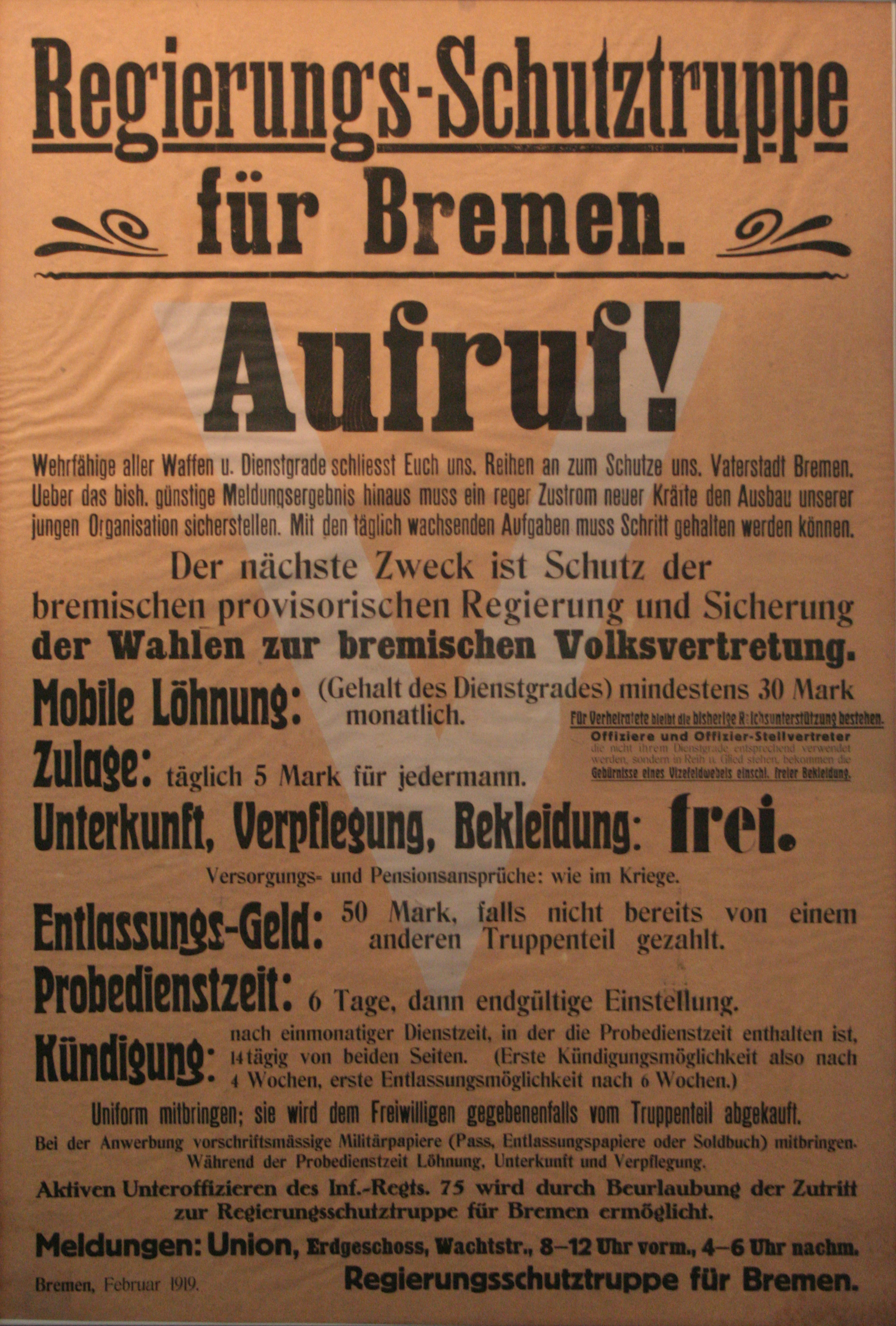
Following the overthrow of the Soviet Republic, a recruitment poster for a government militia to secure Bremen and the election of a city assembly. February 1919

In contrast to the end of the Bavarian Council Republic in Munich and to the suppression of the Spartacists in Berlin, there was only one documented case of a prisoner being shot "while trying to escape". Instead, a total of 269 supporters were disarmed and detained in the prison of Bremen-Oslebshausen, (among them the famous Worpswede painter Heinrich Vogeler).

Elections for the Bremen Constituent Assembly were held as scheduled on 9 March 1919. The MSPD won 32.7% of the vote, the USPD 19.2% and the KPD 7.7%. A new Senate was formed between the MSPD, the liberal German Democratic Party (DDP) and the bourgeois German People's Party (DVP). The KPD took it as an opportunity to call in April for a political strike with the aim of reintroducing the council system and of securing the release of those fighters still incarcerated in Oslebshausen. After being confronted with a barbed wire blockade of Walle and Gröpelingen, the strikers were satisfied with a general amnesty.

The new constitution of the free Hanseatic City of Bremen was promulgated on 18 May 1920. The Bürgerschaft's previously existing eight-class suffrage was abolished, with article 10 of the state constitution expressly providing for universal adult suffrage.

== See also ==
- Aftermath of World War I
- Rat (council)
- Bavarian Soviet Republic
- Alsace Soviet Republic
