= Marie Griesbach =

German revolutionary and writer

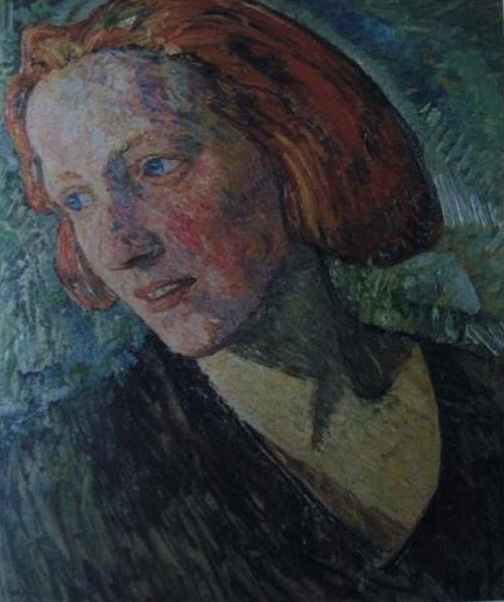
Painting of Marie Griesbach as "Die rote Marie" (Red Marie) by Heinrich Vogeler, 1919

Marie Griesbach (after 1920 Hundt) (26 November 1896, Dresden – 13 March 1984, Ohlenstedt) was a German revolutionary, anthroposophist and writer. She was named Red Marie by Heinrich Vogeler.

During the German Revolution of November 1919 she joined the International Communists of Germany and took legal responsibility for the contents of their newsletter Der Kommunist.
