= Freikorps Caspari =

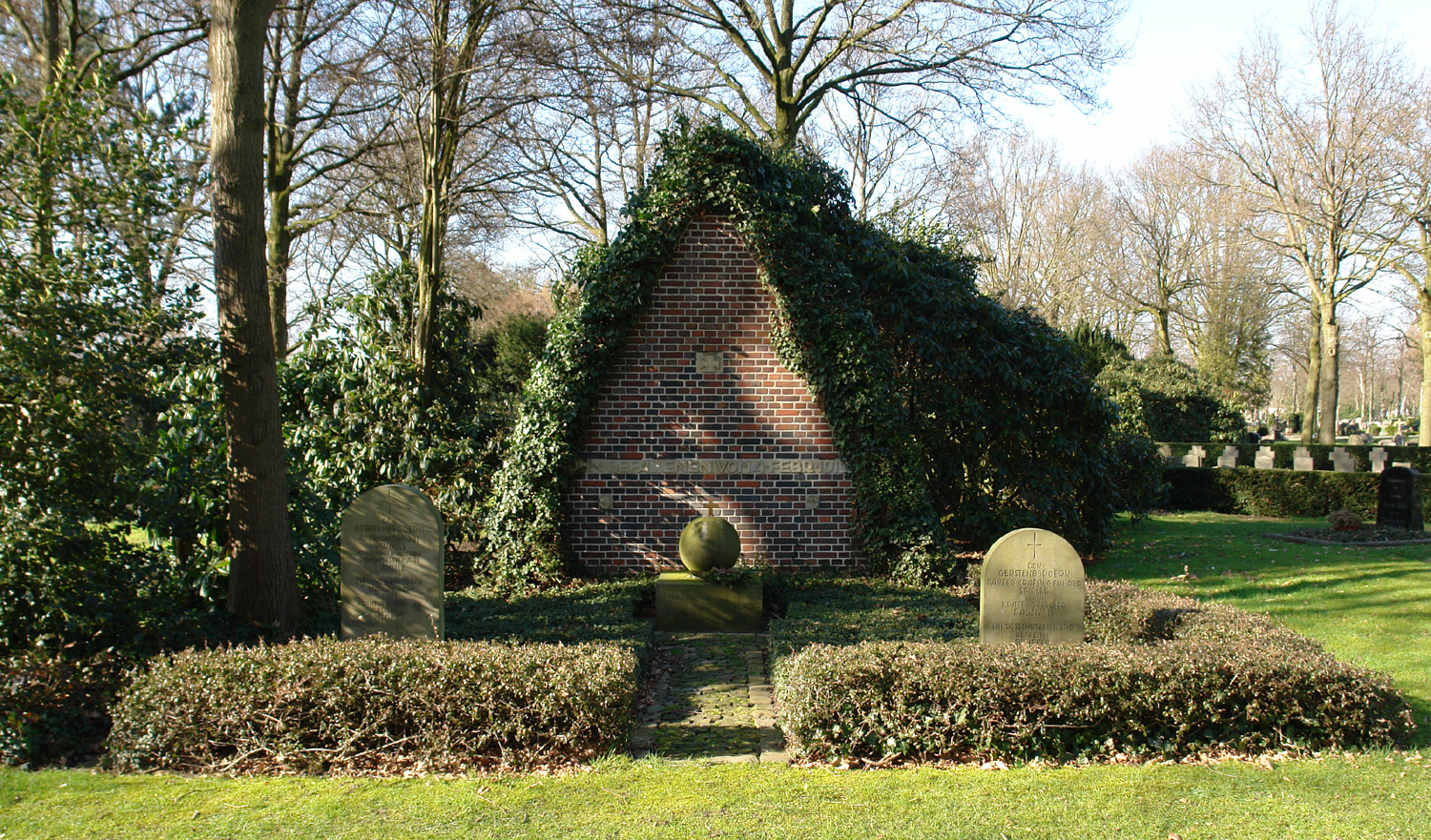
Monument in Bremen to the dead of, among others, Freikorps Caspari.

The Freikorps Caspari was a German anti-communist paramilitary unit, formed and led by Colonel Walter Caspari (1877–1962). It was part of the wider Freikorps movement, volunteer fighters who harshly suppressed socialists, anarchists and communists.

== History ==
In the wake of the First World War, the new Weimar Republic saw a massive increase in revolutionary activity, culminating in the German Revolution of 1918–19. The multi-faceted revolution saw large numbers of workers' and soldiers' councils form, and several socialist republics declared (most prominently the Bavarian Soviet Republic).

In the city of Bremen, the Bremen Soviet Republic was declared in early January 1919. After a month, following the suppression of the Spartacist uprising, Gustav Noske authorized a military intervention against Bremen's revolutionaries. Colonel Wilhelm Gerstenberg organized the "Division Gerstenberg" to participate in the attack, which was soon joined by the Freikorps Caspari, formed by Walter Caspari. Caspari, a veteran of the Boxer Rebellion and the First World War, had previously been expelled from the Bremen workers' and soldiers' council after communist pressure.

The volunteer unit, numbering about 600 fighters, attacked Bremen jointly with Gerstenberg's troops on 4 February at 10:15. They were met by considerable, but uncoordinated, resistance. In the ensuing combat, twenty-four Freikorps fighters and twenty-eight armed workers were killed, in addition to twenty-nine civilian casualties (eighteen men, five women, and six children). While the suppression was not as bloody as elsewhere in Germany at the time, many radicals were killed or arrested afterwards.

In the aftermath of Freikorps Caspari's actions, there have been several monuments erected to the memory of their dead. One memorial was put up on a cemetery in Bremen already in the 1920s, another - the statue Der Jüngling by Herbert Kubica - was erected in 1936. The statue was denazified in the years after the war, and purged of any mention of the Freikorps Caspari or Division Gerstenberg.

== See also ==
- Freikorps Lichtschlag
- Freikorps Oberland
- Marinebrigade Ehrhardt

== Bibliography ==
- Schwarzwälder, Herbert (2002). Das Große Bremen-Lexikon (in German). Bremen: Edition Temmen. ISBN 3-86108-616-6.
- Hartung, Lothar (1997). Deutschs Freikorps 1918-1921 (in German). Langeloh bei Schneverdingen.
- Tessin, Georg (1974). Deutsche Verbände und Truppen (in German). Biblio-Verlag. ISBN 3764810009.
- Müller, Hartmut (1983). Bremer Arbeiterbewegung 1918-1945 (in German). Elefanten Press. p. 30. ISBN 3-88520-103-8.
