= Arbeiterpolitik =

Arbeiterpolitik, Wochenzeitschrift für wissenschaftlichen Sozialismus (English: Labor Politics, The Weekly Journal for Scientific Socialism) was a German scientific socialist weekly newspaper, published by Johann Knief and others for a radical left-wing group of Social-Democrats, the Bremer Linksradikale, in Bremen from 1916 to 1919. Among its notable contributors were Antonie Pannekoek and Otto Rühle.

The journal mostly wrote against the right wing and non-revolutionary tendencies of the SPD.

The magazine welcomed and defended the October Revolution. In 1918 individual chapters from The State and Revolution and from The Military Program of the Proletarian Revolution were published by Vladimir Lenin in the newspaper.

In 1919, the group behind Arbeiterpolitik joined the Communist Party of Germany.
