= Heinrich Jasper =

German politician (1875–1945)

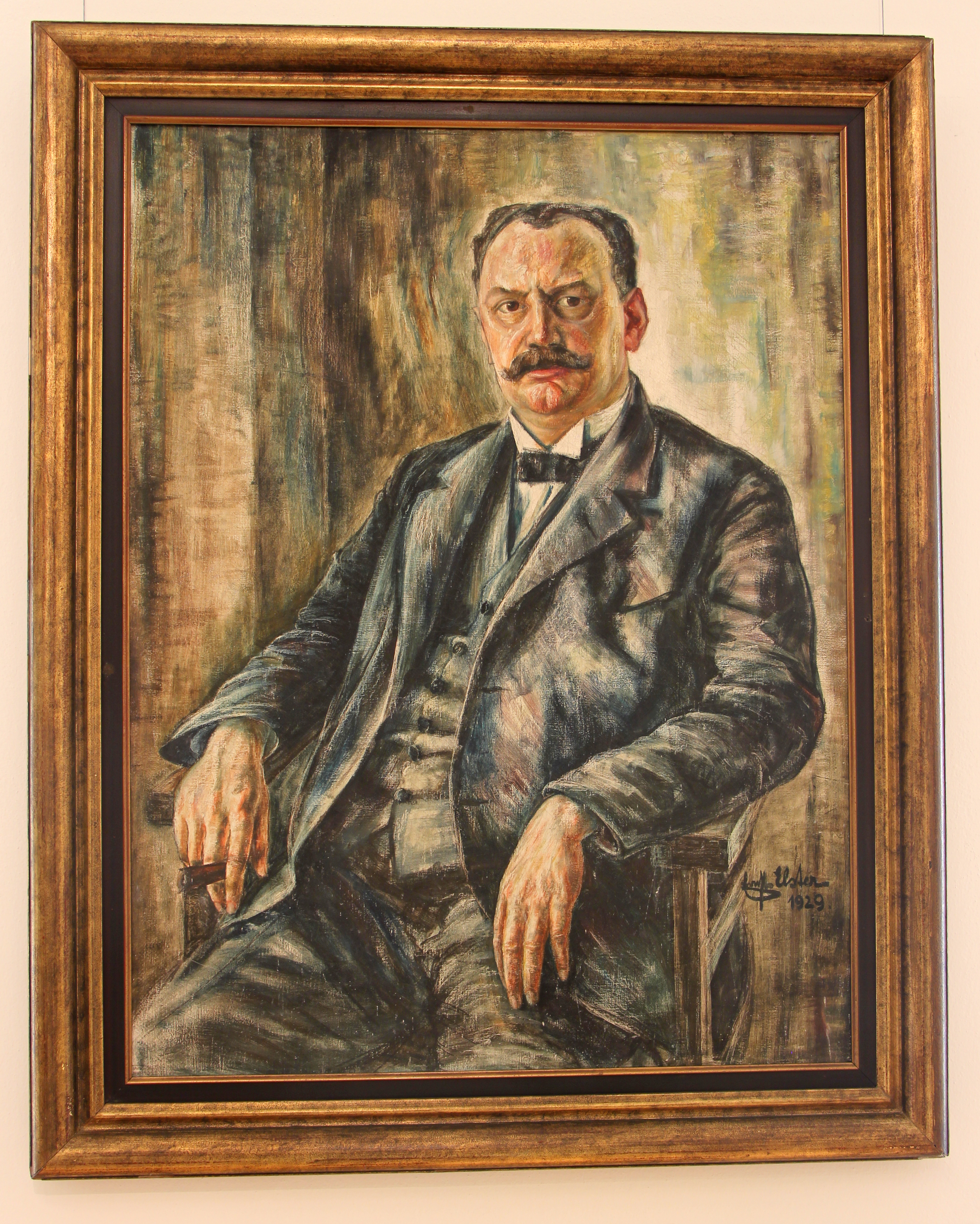
Heinrich Jasper, painting at the Braunschweigisches Landesmuseum

Heinrich Jasper (21 August 1875 – 19 February 1945) was a German politician (SPD). During the 1920s, he served three terms as regional prime minister (Ministerpräsident) of the Free State of Brunswick. He died in the Bergen-Belsen concentration camp.

== Life ==
=== Provenance and early years ===
Heinrich Jasper was born in Dingelbe, a village in the countryside to the southeast of Hanover. His father, Carl August Jasper (1822–1898), was a wealthy tenant farmer. He attended secondary school (Gymnasium) in nearby Hildesheim till 1886 when his parents divorced and his father relocated to Braunschweig, where Jasper successfully completed his schooling at the Wilhelm-Gymnasium. He went on to study jurisprudence at Munich, Leipzig and Berlin. He received his doctorate in 1900 and returned to Braunschweig as a referendary (trainee lawyer), setting up his own legal practice in 1902. He joined the Social Democratic Party ("Sozialdemokratische Partei Deutschlands" / SPD). The ban on SPD participation in elections had been lifted in 1890, but the party was not, at this stage, considered mainstream by members of the political class: Jasper's decision to join it in 1902 was an unusual one for a man from his background. Within the party locally he stood out both on account of his education and because he was a good speaker. In 1909 he was the first Social Democrat elected to the Regional Legislature (Landtag / Landesversammlung).

=== Politics ===
Between 1903 and 1933 Jasper represented the SPD as a Braunschweig city councillor. In July 1915 he went off to serve in the war, having risen to the rank of a Vizefeldwebel (junior officer) by the time he arrived home from the front on 11 November 1918.

National military defeat was followed by a revolutionary eruption in many parts of Germany. In Braunschweig Ernst August, the hereditary ruler had abdicated on 8 November 1918. Jasper took a lead in the political fight against Sepp Oerter and the workers' council, which he condemned as the "dictatorship of an undemocratic minority". On the national stage, from January 1919 he is listed as a member of the Weimar National Assembly, precursor to a national democratically elected parliament, although his political focus during this period continued to be on his own region of Braunschweig.

On 10 February 1919 Jasper was unanimously elected president of the Braunschweig Regional Legislature. A week later, on 19 February 1919, he was elected chairman of the SPD (party - still sometimes during this period identified as the "MSPD / Majority SPD"), reflecting the party split in 1917) in the local Council of the People's Deputies. In April 1919 the Workers' General Strike was ended in Braunschweig which was briefly occupied by a Freikorps unit under the command of General Maercker, after which a level of political stability was restored and Jasper served for several years as president of the Regional Legislature.

=== Minister-president ===
Jasper was a member of the Regional Legislature between 1919 and 1933. During this time he served as Minister-president of the Free State of Braunschweig (Brunswick) from April 1919 till June 1920, from May 1922 till December 1924, and again between December 1927 and October 1930. During the decade his leadership of the party was undisputed. He almost always combined the office of minister-president with that of finance minister.

His period as minister-president ended for the last time with the regional elections of 14 September 1930, which resulted in a regional government for the Free State of Braunschweig led by the so-called Citizens' Unity List ("Bürgerliche Einheitsliste" / BEL), a coalition of right wing parties which together had amassed 11 seats. They now governed in alliance with the Nazi party, which had received 9 seats, under the leadership of Werner Küchenthal of the National People's Party (though three years later Küchenthal joined the Nazi party). The new regional government now set about purging the educational and cultural departments of Social Democrat elements. Between 1930 and 1933, now in opposition, Jasper continued to lead a vigorous opposition from the SPD group in the regional legislature, while the Nazi party gave Braunschweig a foretaste of life in the Third Reich.

=== Government persecution ===
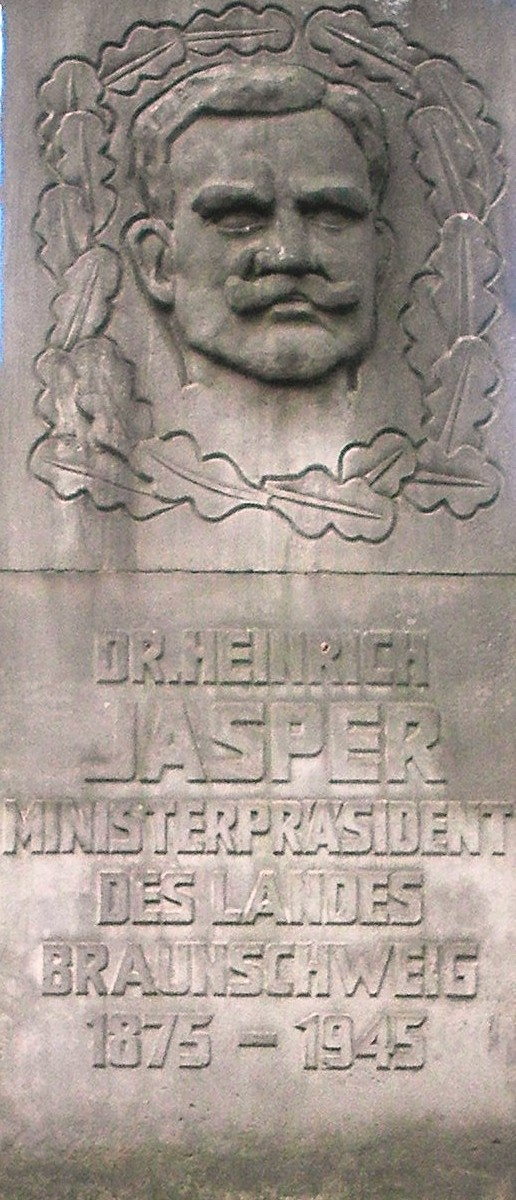
Heinrich Jasper memorial at Seesen

Even before the Nazi party took power nationally at the beginning of 1933, Heinrich Jasper found himself on the receiving end of persecution from the new minister-president, the Nazi party member Dietrich Klagges, who was both his successor and his political opponent in the Braunschweig Legislature. During the early part of 1933 the Nazis took power and converted Germany into a one-party dictatorship. Political activity (except in support of the Nazi party) was becoming illegal. For Jasper personally, long recognised as the leader of the Braunschweig Social Democrats, and according to one source "one of the people most hated by the Nazis" locally, the backdrop was particularly dire.

On 9 March 1933, the Nazi party's quasi-military wing (SS) took over the "House of the Friends of the People" ("Volksfreund-Haus") which was a substantial building, built for and owned by the SPD, in the city. Among other things, the party used it for meetings and for printing their local newspaper, "Der Volksfreund". One employee was shot and several others were badly beaten up. Jasper immediately sent a telegramme to President Hindenburg in which he protested against these excesses.

On 17 March 1933, the Braunschweig SPD party leadership met in the "Hotel Monopol" in order to discuss the situation and what to do next. On the way to the meeting Jasper was arrested and taken into "protective custody" on the orders of Klagges. He was taken to the AOK (Health insurance) building, which the Nazis had commandeered, and badly mishandled. He was then taken to the "House of the Friends of the People", now under Nazi control, and subjected to further mistreatment.

Jasper later reported that Friedrich Alpers, the local SS leader, offered to guarantee Jasper's release from "protective custody" if he would surrender his seat in the Legislature (Landtag) and promise not to submit himself for re-election. Jasper refused. He was released "provisionally" on 19 April 1933. He was re-arrested on 26 June. In July or August the "House of the Friends of the People", by now being used by the SS as an ad hoc prison and torture centre, was renamed as the "Gerhard Landmann House". (It would revert to its former name in 1945.) Some sources indicate that Heinrich Jasper was one of those held in "protective custody" inside, and there is not total unanimity over where he was held when, but during the summer he was taken to the prison at Rennelberg. In 1935 he was transferred to Dachau concentration camp in the south of the country. As soon as he was detained, there were numerous people who clamoured for his release, but without any immediate effect. In 1938 or 1939 (sources differ) he was released: it is not clear what had happened to trigger this development. He returned to Braunschweig where his legal practice was now ruined. He was kept under strict surveillance, and required to report to the Gestapo daily.

Between 1939 and 1942, Jasper was able to undertake historical research at the city archive. Like other surviving politicians of the Weimar Republic, his anti-Nazi past kept him under watch by the authorities. A failed assassination attempt against Hitler took place on 20 July 1944, which was followed by mass arrests. Jasper was re-arrested on 22 August 1944, under the pretext of what was termed "Aktion Gitter".

By now Jasper was 69, and the years of physical and psychological persecution had left him in poor health. On his arrest he was transferred to Hallendorf Work Education Camp ("Camp/Lager 21"); a forced labour facility on the edge of Salzgitter-Watenstedt. In September, he was moved to Sachsenhausen concentration camp. During the early part of 1945, and with the Red army approaching, preparations were made to close down this institution. In February, Jasper was moved again, to Bergen-Belsen concentration camp. There, on 19 February 1945, he died; emaciated and after further subjection to ill treatment. The cause of his death was listed as typhus. His physical remains were placed in a mass grave.
