= Minna Faßhauer =

German politician

- Born: Minna Nikolai; 10 October 1875; Bleckendorf (Magdeburg), Saxony, Germany
- Died: 28 July 1949 (aged 73); Braunschweig, Lower Saxony, German Federal Republic (West Germany)
- Occupations: Socialist activist Women's rights activist People's Commissar for People's Education; Member of the Braunschweig State Parliament; Resistance Activist (1933-1945)
- Political party: SPD; USPD; KAPD; KPD
- Spouse: Johannes Georg Faßhauer
- Children: Otto; Walter
- Parents: Theodor Nikolai (father); Dorothea Schmidt (mother)

Minna Faßhauer (born Minna Nikolai; 10 October 1875 – 28 July 1949) was a political and feminist activist of the left. Before the First World War she campaigned for gender equality both inside and outside the rapidly growing Social Democratic Party, of which she succeeded in becoming a member in 1903. During the war she was actively engaged in the anti-war Spartacus League. In the revolutionary context of 1918/19 she served as Volkskommissarin für Volksbildung ("People's Commissar for People's Education") in the Socialist Republic of Braunschweig between November 1918 and February 1919, leading admirers to identify her as the first female to serve as a minister in a German regional government. (Note: Although the description of Minna Faßhauer as Germany's first female to serve as a government minister is no longer as contentious as it once was, it is nevertheless open to the objection the short-lived Socialist Republic of Braunschweig was "not a real German state".)

More than a century after she served as People's Commissar for People's Education she still divides political opinion. In February 2012 a proposal was submitted by the left-wing group on the Braunschweig city council that Faßhauer should be honoured, possibly through the naming of a street in her honour. But the centre-right CDU group on the council objected that this might be construed as presenting Faßhauer as a role model for the young people. The argument nevertheless persists, underpinned by the lack of consensus over the nature and extent of Faßhauer's involvement in a series of politically related terrorist explosions, in connection with which she was several times arrested between 1920 and 1924. On at least one occasion she was convicted and sentenced to a four month jail term (which she never served, due to a wider amnesty). In 2018 the Braunschweig city fathers were persuaded to accept the designation "Frauenort Minna Faßhauer" (literally "Women Place Minna Faßhauer"), presented on behalf of the Women's Committee of the regional branch of the DGB ("German Trades Union Confederation"). The designation is accompanied by an ambitious on-going education and information project. The campaign for recognition of Faßhauer's political achievements in her home city has done much to publicise her achievements, but there is little reason to believe that she has become less controversial in the process.

== Biography ==
=== Childhood conditioning ===
Minna Nikolai was born into a working-class family in Bleckendorf (as Egeln-Nord was known before 1950), a village in the flat countryside to the south of Magdeburg. Theodor Nikolai, her father, died in 1878 when she was just 3. Between 1881 and approximately 1889 she attended the local school in the village, combining school attendance with casual work in order to support her mother's household budget. She grew up in conditions of economic hardship, leaving school in order to work in "domestic service". She would later attribute her political activism to the economic hardship and inequality that marked her own childhood. She was acutely aware that "[back then] women had no political equality".

=== First political engagement ===
Factory work was significantly better paid, during the closing decades of the nineteenth century, than any of the jobs available in the German countryside, and many rural workers were drawn to the cities as a result. Nikolai was 18 when she relocated to nearby Braunschweig in search of work and immediately found it, initially in domestic service and later in a canning factory. On 16 April 1899, at the Michaelis Church in the old town centre of Braunschweig-"Weichbild", Minna Nikolai married Johannes Georg Faßhauer, a Braunschweig blacksmith. The couple's sons Otto and Walter were born in 1903 and 1906: both lived to adulthood. Minna Faßhauer had left school still unable to read, but encouraged by the Socialist reading material that her husband gave her, it was as a young adult that she both mastered reading and became familiar with some of the political currents of the time.

Very soon she began to campaign for the rights of young working women and, in particular, for equality of treatment between the sexes. At a regional level she made a significant contribution to winning support for the lifting of the ban on political activity by women, which in theory extended across the whole of Germany till it was formally lifted in 1908 (although in practice it is clear that since at least far back as 1890, the ban had been enforced with far more vigour in some parts of Germany - and especially in Prussia - than in others. After 1918 Hermann Wallbaum, a Communist Party member and an observer of the so-called "November revolution" in Braunschweig, characterised Minna Faßhauer's political contribution during those early years as follows:

She was denigrated by the Bourgeois press as a dumb woman: can't read or write, or whatever: doesn't speak German properly ... in any case, she was an honest and energetic woman, who gave her all for the movement. She was a washerwoman, going from house to house to do folks' washing. A regular working woman at the bottom of the [social] ladder. [Yet the radical leaders] August Merges and Robert Gehrke stood closely by her: I just know that she worked her way up from the lowest level through reading etc. Various grammatical blunders in what she wrote were grossly magnified and distorted by bourgeois [commentators]". (Note: "Die wurde von der bürgerlichen Presse hingestellt als dummes Weib: kann nicht lesen und schreiben, so etwa; beherrscht die deutsche Sprache nicht […] Jedenfalls war die ’ne ehrliche und aktive Frau, die für die Bewegung alles hergab. Sie war eine Waschfrau und ging von Haus zu Haus und wusch den Leuten die Wäsche. Eine richtiggehende Arbeiterin in den untersten Reihen. Merges und Robert Gehrke standen mit ihr in enger Beziehung; ich weiß bloß, daß sie sich aus dem niedrigsten Milieu raufarbeitete durch Lesen und so weiter. Verschiedene Schnitzer, die da beim Schreiben vorkamen, die hat die Bourgeoisie ausgeschlachtet".)

In 1903 Minna Faßhauer became a member of the Social Democratic Party ("Sozialdemokratische Partei Deutschlands"/ SPD) becoming, according to her own later account, a party official. Again a principal focus of her campaigning was the abolition of the national prohibition on women becoming politically active. That goal was finally achieved in April 1908 with the passing of the so-called "Reichsvereinsgesetz" (loosely, "National Association Law") which standardised the regulation of political organisation - hitherto subject to a bewildering mixture of national and regional laws and regulations - across the whole of Germany.

Another issue on which, because of her own childhood experiences, Faßhauer campaigned was the care and education of workers' children. At the end of 1907 the "Bildungsverein jugendlicher Arbeiter" ("Young Workers' Educational Association") was inaugurated in Braunschweig as an SPD youth wing. The association's first president was Robert Wiebold. Other founder members who later achieved prominence as political or resistance activists included Fritz Benke and Otto Grotewohl. It is not clear whether or not Faßhauer was involved in establishing "Bildungsverein jugendlicher Arbeiter", but she was instrumental in changing its name less than a year later. In 1908 she attended the party's fifth Women's Conference which was held, that year, at Nuremberg under the joint presidency of Luise Zietz and the formidable Clara Zetkin. There were two delegates from Braunschweig: the other was Lina Behrens. Faßhauer and Behrens submitted a report to the conference in which they recommended that, in the light of recent changes in the legal situation, the "Bildungsverein jugendlicher Arbeiter" should be renamed "Bildungsverein jugendlicher Arbeiterinnen und Arbeiter" ("Young female and male Workers' Educational Association"). The recommendation was accepted and the change was implemented.

Right up till the outbreak of war in July 1914 Faßhauer's principal political concern was with the demand for equal rights for women. That included the right to vote. She delivered talks on these themes and took frequent opportunities to raise them at party meetings, for example in her address the first Wolfenbüttel Women's Day on 2 March 1913. In 1913 or 1914 a "Children's Protection Commission" for Braunschweig was established. Members included Berta Schlösser, Anne Menge und Hedwig Steinbrecher along with Faßhauer herself. The commission was charged with monitoring compliance with the 1904 Child Protection Regulations, and other measures intended to support the health and cultural well-being of children.

=== War ===
During the war years Minna Faßhauer sustained contact with August Merges who would emerged in November 1918 as the president of the revolutionary "Socialist Republic of Braunschweig". The approach of war led to a party split, because the negative consequences were all too easy to foretell. Food prices rose dramatically, while workers' wages did not. Minna Faßhauer could see no merit in the so-called "Burgfriedenspolitik" whereby leading figures in the SPD and in the trades unions aligned to it agreed to a parliamentary truce in support of a traditional vision of "Patriotism". The move was contentious from the outset: Faßhauer was drawn increasingly towards the anti-war policies and the socialist ideas represented by Rosa Luxemburg und Karl Liebknecht. Faßhauer and Merges were closely aligned in respect of the war, and in 1915 they together made contact with leaders of "the International", At a political meeting during the early months of 1916 Faßhauer protested noisily against the party's parliamentary support for further war funding and the resulting prolongation of the war, after which she was excluded from the "National Women's Service" organisation.

In 1916 or 1917 she also joined the Braunschweig branch of the anti-war Spartacus League. In 1917 she was prominently involved in the August strike, during the course of which, at 15.00 in Wednesday 15 August, approximately 5,000 striking workers gathered for an unauthorized meeting at the "Ölper Waldhaus" in order to appoint a negotiating commission. Minna Faßhauer was one of the five members elected. She is described in reports as "party representative and President of the pro-Spartakus Women's Club".

During 1917 the tensions that had troubled the party over the leadership’s parliamentary support for the war became unsustainable. The party split. Minna Faßhauer, opposed to the war, was one of those who became a member of the breakaway Independent Social Democratic Party ("Unabhängige Sozialdemokratische Partei Deutschlands" / USPD). Her political work, at this time, included strengthening then influence of the USPD in workplaces and, where appropriate, luring members of the SPD away to the USPD. As the disastrous war neared its end she took an active part in the build-up to what became known as the "November revolution" of 1918/19. She was one of the leaders of the revolution when it erupted locally just outside Braunschweig, at Wolfenbüttel.

=== Braunschweig Socialist Republic ===
The German republic was proclaimed in Berlin on 9 November 1918 and the emperor's abdication was announced the same day, though a more formal statement of abdication by the emperor himself - by that time in exile near Utrecht - came nineteen days later, on 28 November. Before that, on 10 November 1918 the" Workers' and soldiers' soviet" in Braunschweig marched on the state parliament building and proclaimed the "Braunschweig Socialist Republic". They called for a one-party USPD state government and, in response to a proposal by Sepp Oerter who had arrived back from Leipzig two days earlier, unanimously proclaimed/selected August Merges, to be its president. Merges was a powerful orator and popular with the rioters and demonstrators who at this point controlled the streets and the parliament building of Braunschweig.

The revolutionaries drew much of their inspiration from the success of the so-called Petrograd October Revolution of the previous year, even if the finer points of Leninist constitutional theory had yet to become apparent. The governance of the "Braunschweig Socialist Republic" was to be entrusted to a council of people's commissars under the chairmanship of Sepp Oerter. The council consisted of eight men and - remarkably in the context of the times - one woman. Minna Faßhauer, aged 43 at the time, was the woman. She was given the "People's Education" portfolio. Education was the only department that had two people's commissars, possibly on account of the gender of one of them. Faßhauer's co-commissar was Jean Kautz concerning whom, other than his name, nothing is known.

Faßhauer served as People's Commissar for People's Education between 10 November 1918 and 21 February 1919. The revolutionary Braunschweig state government was then replaced by a significantly more democratic system on 22 February 1919. The new administration contained members both of the USPD and of the SPD. Faßhauer was not among them. Before that happened, on 22 November 1918, as People's Education Commissar, Faßhauer abolished church oversight of the schools, and reduced the age at which young people might make their own choices about religious affiliation (so-called "Religionsmündigkeit") to 14. That was only part of a more wide ranging and arguably more contentious socialist reform programme. Her decree on arrangements for History teaching, issued on 16 November 1918, placed a prohibition on the "glorification of princes" or "Incitement of popular hatred": it replaced "History of War" with "History of Culture and the Arts". That involved removing certain publications from libraries and changing or replacing school books. She also committed to set up People's Kindergartens and People's Junior Schools.

During much of the revolution year, between December 1918 and May 1919, Faßhauer sat as a USPD member of the Braunschweig State Parliament ("Braunschweigischer Landtag"). In January 1919 she was elected to the Braunschweig regional party executive and stood for election, unsuccessfully, for election to the provisional national parliament ("Nationalversammlung") in Weimar.

=== Explosives attacks in 1921 ===
During the early 1920s it became the turn of the USPD to splinter apart. Some of its activist members were among the founders of the Communist Party of Germany, at a conference held in Berlin between 30 December 1918 and 1 January 1919: others quickly switched to the new party. Faßhauer herself then joined the "Communist Workers' Party" ("Kommunistische Arbeiter-Partei Deutschlands" / KAPD), itself an early extremist anti-parliamentarian breakaway organisation from what was becoming in Germany the mainstream Communist Party. Minna Faßhauer was a member of the KAPD between April 1920 and its dissolution in 1933. She was also actively involved with the "Free Workers' Union" ("Freie Arbeiter Union Deutschlands" / FAUD), a self-defined anarcho-syndicalist trade union with a strongly political agenda, of which the membership came, primarily, from the building trades and textiles sector.

Between 1920 and 1924 Faßhauer was repeatedly arrested in connection with "terrorist actions against churches and civil (or bourgeois) institutions", and on several occasions she found herself before the courts. On 16 July 1921 she was ordered by a court to pay a 300 Mark fine and sentenced to four months in prison for a violation of the Disarmament Act of 5 August 1920. It was alleged that on 17 September 1920 she had participated in a "public communist meeting" at Nordhausen, and on that occasion stated that the workers would have to be idiots to lay down their weapons while the bourgeoisie held on to theirs. Faßhauer insisted she had said no such thing, and went on to spell out what she had said, but her passionately delivered testimony (supported by reports produced by the prosecutor concerning her frequent appearances at political meetings and agitation for armed proletarian revolution) served only to persuade the court that she was a dangerous political extremist, irrespective of what she might or might not have said at that meeting. Nevertheless, the sentence was subsequently set aside in the context of a wider amnesty.

Her name also came up in connection with a succession of allegedly terrorist explosions. During the course of July 1921, with governance over the Free State of Braunschweig again in the hands of a(nother) SPD/USPD coalition administration under Sepp Oerter, the city experienced several "politically motivated explosives attacks". Targets included the Braunschweig Tennis and Hockey facilities in the "Bürgerpark", the Garrison Church between the "Stadtpark" and the "Prinz Albrecht Park" and the home of Ernst Lekebusch, a major land owner in the region. Another was the laboratory of Dr. Paul Nehring, possibly in account of his contributions to the justice system locally as a "court chemistry expert" ("Gerichtschemiker"). On 6 September 1921 Faßhauer was one of a number of suspects arrested and then eventually charged "having been involved in procuring dynamite" in connection with the explosions two months earlier. However, the court was unable to determine beyond reasonable whether and to what extent Faßhauer had taken part in the attacks. The trial finally opened at the Braunschweig District High Court, and under conditions of extensively enhanced security, only on 21 March 1922, with extensive. The proceedings were "at times, turbulent". There seems to have been an underlying assumption, encouraged by the prosecution (but still questioned by researchers and commentators a century later) that she must at least have had some knowledge of the planning of the attacks. She was convicted and sentenced, this time to a nine month prison term. Proceedings concluded during early April 1922, more than seven months after the arrests. According to persuasive albeit circumstantial evidence, following her arrest Faßhauer had been detained at the prison in nearby Wolfenbüttel. That would indicate that by the time she was convicted and sentenced, she had already spent a considerable amount of time - albeit not as much as nine months - in pre-trial detention, and the warrant for her to serve the months remaining following sentencing was rescinded by the court "having regard to then long period of detention during the investigation", and possibly reflecting some unease on the part of the justice officials involved as to the reliability of the trial verdict.

=== Twelve years of Hitler ===
In January 1933 the Hitler government took power and rapidly transformed Germany into a one-party dictatorship. All political parties apart from the ruling "party" were outlawed and their (former) members subjected to some combination of surveillance, persecution or worse. Those identified as "communists" were persecuted with particular dedication. Faßhauer and her long-standing friend and political ally August Merges participated in the Kommunistische Räte-Union", a leftist resistance group centred on Braunschweig, but also well networked with equivalent groups in Berlin and, closer to home, Magdeburg. During five months between December 1934 and April 1935 the group was crushed by the security services. At least 20 activist members were arrested, including Merges and Faßhauer. Trial and sentencing followed five months later. On 5 October 1935 all the accused were found guilty of High Treason. Merges was sentenced to a three year jail term. Faßhauer was also sentenced to a jail term, but this was almost immediately set aside when her conviction was reversed on appeal. She was not released, however. Instead, on 24 October 1935 she was transferred to Moringen concentration camp. During her relatively brief time at the "camp" she remained actively engaged with the illegal Communist Party. Release came on 13 January 1936, by which tome her health had deteriorated badly. She survived, but remained under close surveillance by the security services till 1945.

=== Final years ===
After the war ended, despite being over 70 and her poor health, Minna Faßhauer set about re-establishing the Communist Party in Braunschweig. From 1946 her name began to appear on the party candidate list for local government elections, but Braunschweig had ended up in the British occupation zone. Outside the Soviet zone the Communist Party no longer enjoyed even a semblance of mass appeal, and she was not elected. On 4 March 1946 Minna Faßhauer was officially recognised as a victim of fascism.

Minna Faßhauer died on 28 July 1949, having suffered a stroke. The eulogy at her funeral, three days later, was delivered by Arthur Krull.

== Posthumous controversy over "a fitting tribute" ==
On 16 February 2012 "Die Linke" ("the Left") party group on the Braunschweig city council submitted an application that the city fathers should come up with "a proposal whereby Minna Faßhauer might, in the future, be appropriately honoured. In support of the application it was pointed out that "... in 1918 the Braunschweig soviet government elected [Faßhauer] People's Commissar for People's Education. That meant she became the first woman anywhere in Germany to be elected to ministerial office. During her term in office the law on the separation of church and state was set in motion, along with the abolition of single-sex schools." Her record in office justified a suitable honour. In September 2012 it was suggested that a street should be named after her in the city's Viewegsgarten-Bebelhof quarter. The suggestion was not implemented, however.

An intense debate followed over whether or not the city should confer some honour on Faßhauer. At the time no comprehensive biographical record of Faßhauer's life was in the public domain: on 13 November 2012 the "Institute for Braunschweig Regional History" at the "Technical University of Braunschweig", under the directorship of Gerd Biegel, was mandated to compile a biographical report for submission to the council, in order that they might reach a properly informed decision on the matter. Gerd Biegel took personal responsibility for the report, which runs to 51 pages, and which was submitted to the city council in July 2013. Despite the availability of biographical information on Minna Faßhauer, the proposal that she deserved to be honoured remained contentious.

On 26 July 2013 Gert Hoffmann (CDU), at that time Braunschweig's senior mayor, shared some preliminary conclusions from a contemporary political perspective:

"... Minna Faßhauer was a remarkable woman, and during a critical phase an important figure in the history of the state of Braunschweig. There are many important figures in the history of the state of Braunschweig, even during the latest one hundred years, but their contributions were anything but exemplary, and accordingly they are not eligible for any sort of celebratory memorial. But in the judgment of the city administration, when it comes to deciding what is deserving of celebration - that is to say, what makes a personality an appropriate recipient of honour from our present generation - it becomes a question if manifesting exemplary character traits. Minna Faßhauer simply cannot be said to have demonstrated such exemplary character traits, even according to this latest documentation. That would constitute a flagrant contradiction, in all ways, of what we should be presenting to today's younger generation as a role model for a political personality. You might classify the delinquent political crimes for which, during the Weimar period, Minna Faßhauer was convicted as no more than 'political sins of youth', committed in response to extreme political circumstances, for which she should not stand condemned for the rest of her life. But the decisive factor is that Minna Faßhauer ... was politically opposed to parliamentary democracy in the 1920s and thereafter through her entire life. ... She displayed this through to the end of her life, given that after the ending of the National Socialist regime she did not join a democratic party - such as the Social Democrats, for example - but the expressly anti-democratic anti-parliamentary Communist Party of Germany (KPD) which later would be banned by the [West] German constitutional court precisely on account of its unconstitutionality."

On 8 August 2013 a majority on the Braunschweig Council's Committee for Arts and Sciences voted against the proposal of the CDU group for an "appreciation" (rather than an "honour") for Faßhauer. This unleashed a torrent of outrage among CDU councillors. There could be no question of discussing an honour for Faßhauer in the context whereby this would make her a potential role model, given the still unclear nature and extent of her "entanglements" in the 1921 bomb attacks experienced in Braunschweig during 1921. They also focused on the attitude of radical anti-parliamentarianism that Hoffmann had spelled out two weeks earlier.

Some days after the vote of the Committee for Arts and Sciences, in a significant shift of position, the SPD group on the council stepped back from endorsing an official "appreciation" for Faßhauer, suggesting instead a "critical appreciation". Ernst-August Roloff, an acknowledged expert on the history of Braunschweig during the years of the so-called 'Weimar Republic' and of 'Nazism', summarized the position: "You can make the charge that she was close to the bomb attackers and of having known about the attacks. ... She deserves respect and recognition; but she is not a democratic exemplar. A week or so after that the SPD took a further decision on the affair, now agreeing to defer any final decision.

On 28 September 2013 there was a vote of the council on the original proposal from the "Die Linke" ("the Left") party group that Minna Faßhauer should be appropriately honoured by the city. The motion was supported by "Die Linke" and by "The Greens". However, the CDU and SPD now teamed up to oppose the motion as submitted, which was then withdrawn without going to a vote. Grounds reported for the failure of the proposal to gain traction with the council were again Faßhauer's "problematic" relationship with parliamentary democracy and her still "unclarified involvement" in the explosives attacks of 1921.

The SPD group then came up with a new proposal, providing that a number of historical Braunschweig personalities from the time of the "November Revolution" and the "Weimar" years, tight up till the National Socialist take-over, might deserve a "critical appreciation" in the context of the continuing controversy over how and whether to honour Minna Faßhauer. The proposal attracted the support of the CDU councillors. Names mentioned included those of Otto Grotewohl, Carl Heimbs, Werner Küchenthal, August Merges, Sepp Oerter and the elder Ernst August Roloff. When the time came for a formal vote, however, the council turned down the idea on 17 December 2021.

The question of a fitting honour to celebrate Minna Faßhauer remains unresolved. The long-running controversy over it has nevertheless been accompanied by far greater awareness and discussion concerning her life and career. A slightly unconventional tribute was premiered in November 2014 in the form of "Minna - a life in Braunschweig", a musical revue staged at the "Brunsviga" arts, communications and performance venue. In the first performances the title role was taken by Gisa Flake, a local actress and cabaret artiste with a national reputation. That first production was supported with a €20.000 grant from the State Ministry for the Arts, Sciences and Humanities.
