= Friedrich Alpers =

German Nazi politician and SS-Obergruppenführer

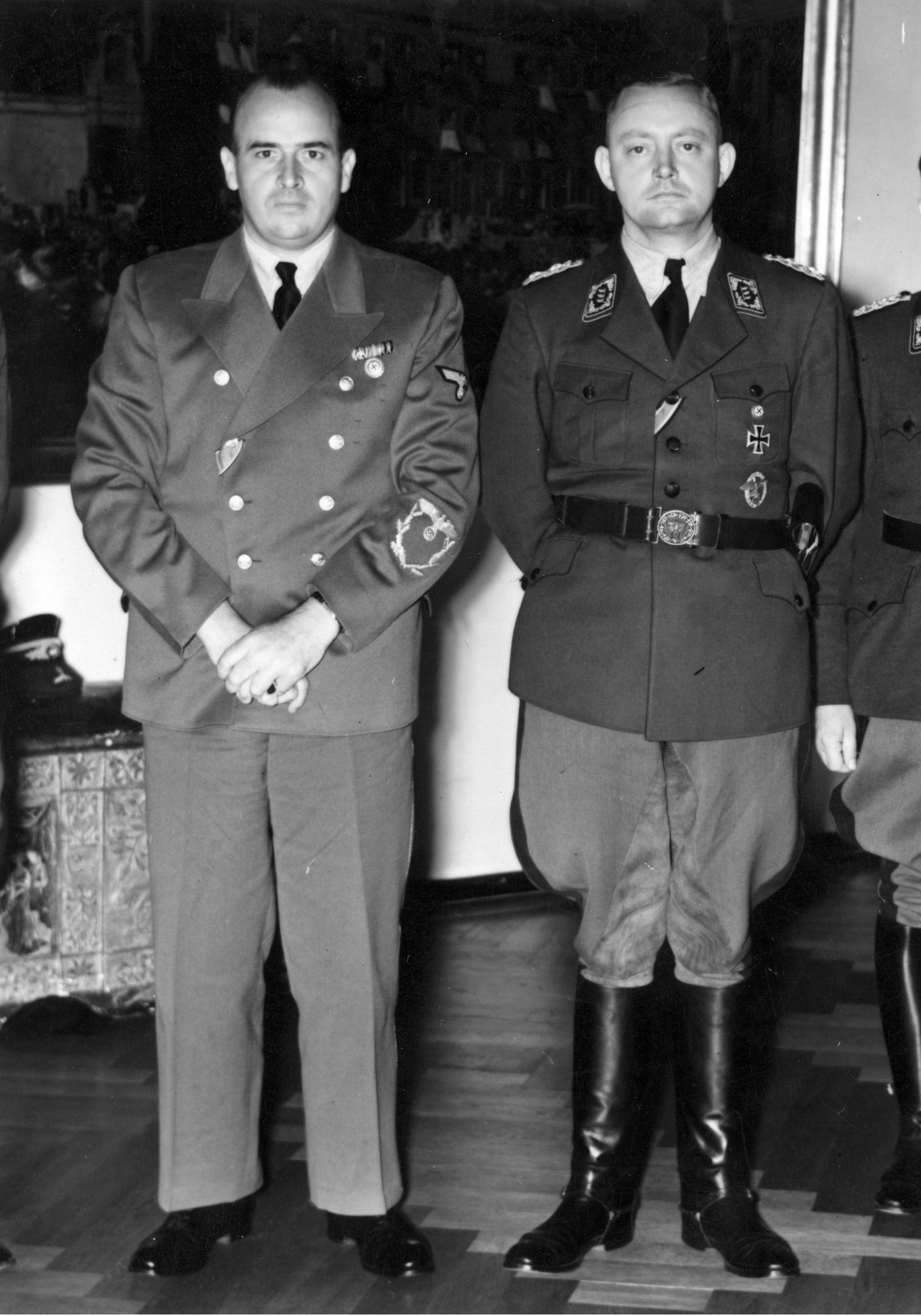
- Alpers (right) with Hans Frank in July 1940

State Secretary and General Forest Master Reich Forestry Office
- In office 1 November 1937 – February 1944
- Preceded by: Walter von Keudell
- Succeeded by: Dietrich Klagges

Minister for Forestry and Hunting Free State of Brunswick
- In office 1 November 1937 – February 1944

Minister of Finance Free State of Brunswick
- In office 8 May 1933 – 31 October 1937
- Preceded by: Werner Küchenthal
- Succeeded by: Dietrich Klagges

Minister of Justice Free State of Brunswick
- In office 8 May 1933 – 31 December 1934
- Preceded by: Werner Küchenthal
- Succeeded by: Position abolished

Personal details
- Born: Friedrich Ludwig Herbert Alpers; 25 March 1901 Sonnenberg, Duchy of Brunswick, German Empire
- Died: 3 September 1944 (aged 43) Quevy, Reichskommissariat of Belgium and Northern France
- Resting place: Lommel, Belgium
- Education: University of Greifswald
- Profession: Lawyer
- Civilian awards: Golden Party Badge

Military service
- Allegiance: Weimar Republic; Nazi Germany
- Branch/service: Reichswehr (Freikorps); Schutzstaffel; Luftwaffe
- Years of service: 1919–1920; 1931–1944; 1937–1944
- Rank: SS-Obergruppenführer; Major
- Commands: Long Range Reconnaissance Group 4 Regiment 9, 3rd Parachute Division
- Battles/wars: World War II
- Military awards: Knight's Cross of the Iron Cross; German Cross in Gold

Friedrich Alpers (25 March 1901 – 3 September 1944) was a German Nazi politician, a Luftwaffe officer and an SS-Obergruppenführer. He was also a Minister of the Free State of Brunswick, and Generalforstmeister (General Forest Master) in the government of Nazi Germany. Alpers was responsible for numerous political crimes in Brunswick. He died during the Second World War, most likely by suicide.

== Early life ==
Born the son of a Sonnenberg Volksschule teacher in 1901, Alpers went to school in that town and the Gymnasium in Braunschweig until 1919. He performed military service with the Reichswehr from May 1919 until March 1920 as a volunteer with the Freikorps "Landesjäger", headed by General Georg Maercker. He then studied law and political science at Heidelberg University, the Ludwig-Maximilians-Universität München and the University of Greifswald, and passed his preliminary law exams in 1923. He then was employed as a salesman with Grotrian-Steinweg in Braunschweig and with shipping businesses in Liverpool, London and Lucerne through the end of 1924. He returned to Germany and his legal studies through 1928, qualifying as an assessor in the spring of 1929 and went into practice as a lawyer in Braunschweig through May 1933.

== SS and Nazi political career ==
On 1 June 1929, Alpers joined the Nazi Party (membership number 132,812). As an early Party member, he later would be awarded the Golden Party Badge. On 1 May 1930, he joined the Sturmabteilung (SA), the Nazi Party paramilitary organization, becoming the SA leader in Braunschweig with the rank of SA-Sturmführer. At the 14 September 1930 Brunswick state election, he was elected to the Brunswick Landtag as a Nazi Party deputy. On 1 March 1931, he transferred to the SS (membership number 6,427) and became an SS-Sturmführer in SS-Standarte 12, headquartered in Braunschweig. From 8 October 1932 to 3 May 1933, he served as the first commander of SS-Standarte 49, also in Braunschweig.

After the Nazi seizure of power at the national level, Alpers was active in the persecution of political opponents during the Gleichschaltung (coordination) process of taking over the German states. In March 1933, he was made the chief of the Hilfspolizei (Auxiliary Police) in Brunswick. This force was directly answerable to Ministerpräsident Dietrich Klagges and consisted of SA, SS and Der Stahlhelm men. On 11 March, Alpers ordered his SS men to break into two Jewish-owned warehouses disguised as robbers and vandalize the properties, and then in a public address he cast the blame on the Communists.

On 4 July 1933, together with Brunswick Police President Friedrich Jeckeln, Alpers was involved in the Rieseberg Murders of eleven Communists and labor organizers in Rieseberg (today, part of (Königslutter), about 15 miles (24 km) east of Braunschweig. Alpers was temporarily suspended from the SS following complaints of excessive violence made against him during the takeover of Brunswick. He was later briefly transferred to a staff position with the SS-Oberabschnitt (SS-Main District) Nord based in Hanover until 15 September when he returned to Braunschweig on the staff of SS-Oberabschnitt Nordwest (renamed SS-Oberabschnitt Mitte,1 April 1936), commanded by Jeckeln. In November 1937, Alpers was assigned to the personal staff of Reichsführer-SS Heinrich Himmler, and he became a member of the Lebensborn Society that year.

During these years, Alpers also advanced his political career, becoming Finance Minister and Justice Minister of Brunswick on 8 May 1933 in the Klagges cabinet. He left the Justice portfolio at the end of 1934 when the Reich assumed the administration of all state justice ministries, but remained at the head of Finance until the end of October 1937. In 1934 he also was named the Gaujägermeister (District Hunt Master) of Brunswick and, on 1 November 1937, after leaving the Finance Ministry, he became the State Minister for Forestry and Hunting in the Brunswick state government.

Also on 1 November 1937, at the Reich level, he was named State Secretary and Generalforstmeister (General Forest Master) in the Reich Forestry Office, as well as the permanent representative of Hermann Göring, who headed the Office as Reichsforstmeister. He became Göring's protégé, and was named by him to the Prussian State Council. He was also a member of Generalrat (General Council) of the Four Year Plan, also headed by Göring. In June 1938, he became the leader of the Reich Forestry Association and on 27 November was made the leader of the forestry officials professional group in the Reichsbund der Deutschen Beamten (Reich Federation of German Civil Servants). On 11 May 1939, he became vice-president of the International Forest Center in Berlin.

== Military and wartime service ==
In January 1937, Alpers entered military service with the Luftwaffe reserve. He trained as an aerial observer and was assigned to a long range reconnaissance unit in Braunschweig. On the outbreak of the Second World War, he served with Reconnaissance Group 22 during the invasion of Poland and later in the western campaign. In his capacity as a State Secretary, Alpers was a participant in a meeting of the Economic Leadership Staff East on 2 May 1941 in Berlin. This meeting developed the Hunger Plan that envisioned mass starvation in the Soviet Union as a result of confiscation of foodstuffs to support the planned German invasion.

Following the launch of Operation Barbarossa, Alpers again served with Reconnaissance Group 22 on the eastern front from June 1941 to January 1942. From January to October 1942, he commanded Long Range Reconnaissance Group 4 in Nikolajew (today, Mykolaiv). During his years of service with the Luftwaffe, he advanced in rank from Leutnant to Major by June 1942. Alpers was also given police duties with the auxiliary urban and rural police forces (Stadt- und Landwacht) that were established by Himmler. Alpers transferred in March 1944 to a paratroop (Fallschirmjäger) regiment in the 3rd Parachute Division posted in Brittany. After the D-Day invasion on 6 June, it moved to Normandy and was engaged in heavy fighting on the western front. Alpers became the regimental commander on 21 August.

== Death ==
Badly wounded in battle near Mons, he died on 3 September 1944 in Quévy after being captured by Allied troops. There is some question about the manner of his death, with most sources indicating that he committed suicide though another indicates he may have been shot.

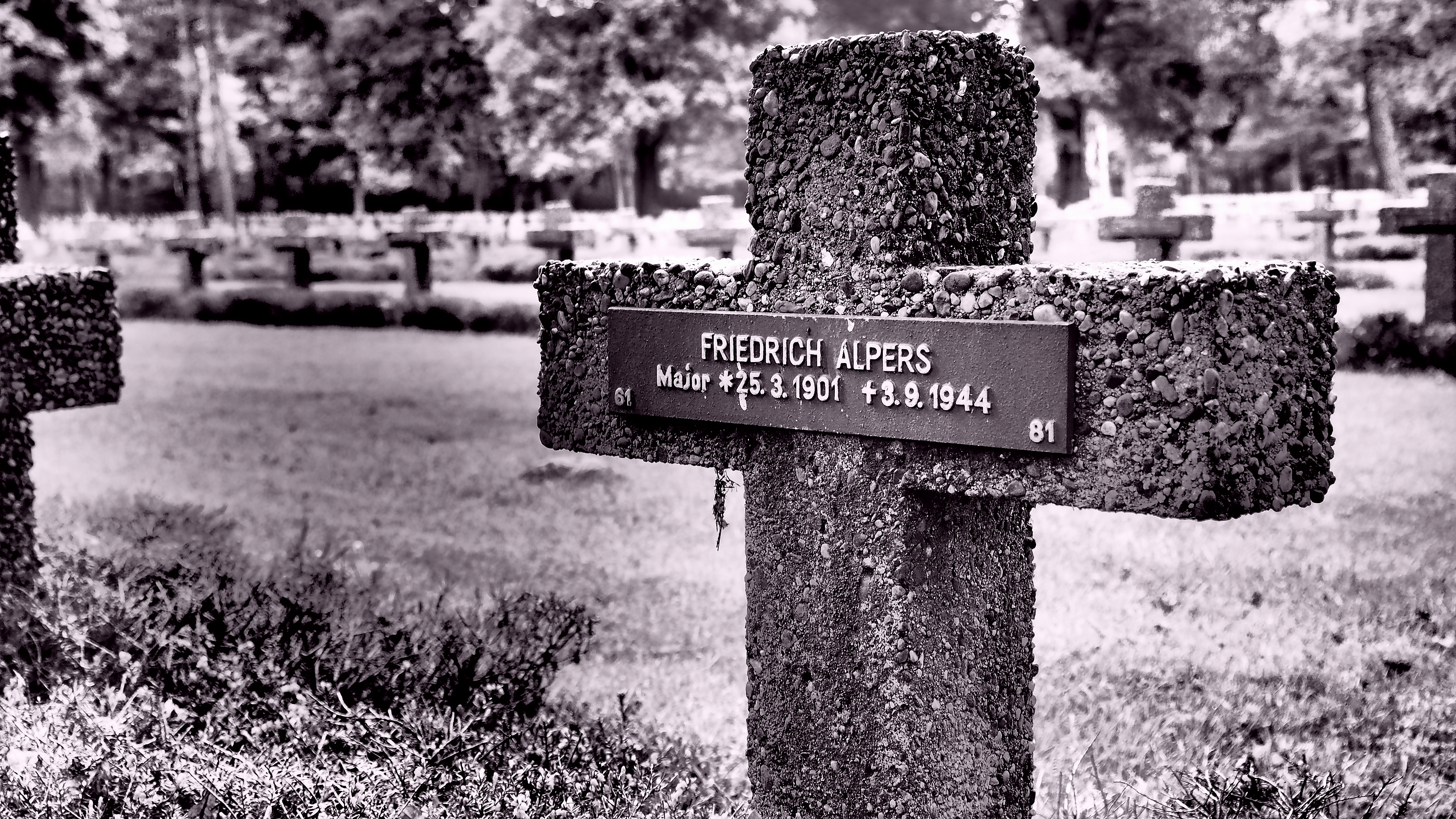
Alpers's grave

== SS and Luftwaffe ranks ==
SS and Luftwaffe ranks
Date	Rank
5 January 1932	SS-Sturmführer
14 March 1932	SS-Sturmhauptführer
8 October 1932	SS-Sturmbannführer
3 May 1933	SS-Standartenführer
9 November 1934	SS-Oberführer
30 January 1936	SS-Brigadeführer
1 September 1937	Leutnant der Reserve
1 March 1939	Oberleutnant der Reserve
5 September 1939	Hauptmann der Reserve
20 April 1941	SS-Gruppenführer
1 June 1942	Major der Reserve
21 June 1943	SS-Obergruppenführer

== Awards ==
- German Cross in Gold on 9 April 1942 as Hauptmann in the 3.(F)/Aufklärungs-Gruppe 121
- Knight's Cross of the Iron Cross on 14 October 1942 as Major and commander of Fernaufklärungs-Gruppe 4
- Golden Party Badge on 30 January 1943

== See also ==
- List SS-Obergruppenführer
