= August Merges =

German revolutionary (1870–1945)

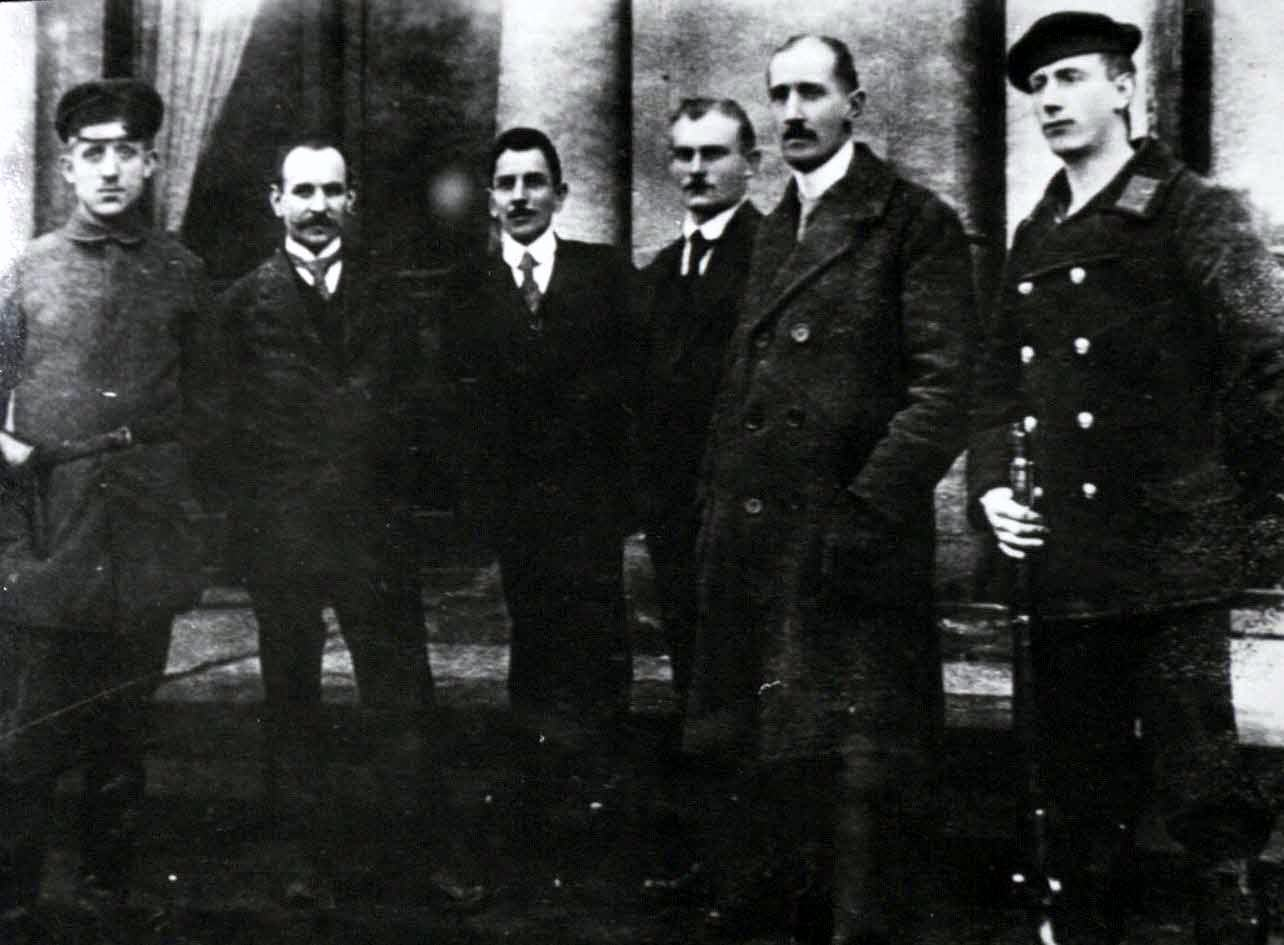
- Braunschweig Novemberrevolution Delegation Arbeiter- und Soldatenrat 8. Nov. 1918
- Born: August Ernst Reinhold Merges; 3 March 1870; Malstatt-Burbach, Trier, Rhine Province, Prussia, Germany
- Died: 6 March 1945 (aged 75); Braunschweig, Südhannover-Braunschweig, Germany
- Occupations: Political activist Anti-war activist Revolutionary activist Campaigning journalist Parliamentarian
- Political party: SPD; USPD; KPD; KAPD
- Spouse: Minna Hermes (Note: Minna Hermes, who became Minna Merges after she married, is sometimes conflated in sources with Minna Faßhauer, a revolutionary comrade. This is incorrect. They were two completely different women.)
- Children: 5

August Ernst Reinhold Merges (3 March 1870 – 6 March 1945) was a German activist, politician and revolutionary. He was a member of various communist and syndicalist organisations; becoming one of the leaders of the German Revolution in Braunschweig, and subsequently a member of the Weimar National Assembly, convened in 1919 to draw up a constitution for the new German republic. In 1933, he came to the notice of the authorities as a "background member" of an anti-government resistance group. In 1945, after he was found dead in the little summer-hut in his son's allotment (where he lived for the last two years of his life) it was determined that ever since undergoing a succession of severe torture sessions at the hands of the security services during and after 1935, he had suffered without a break from the bone tuberculosis that killed him. His name is accordingly listed on the "Reichstag Memorial" to the 96 members of the parliament who died "unnaturally" during the twelve Hitler years.

== Life ==
=== Provenance and early years ===
August Ernst Reinhold Merges was born into a Protestant family in 1870 at Malstatt-Burbach, just outside Saarbrücken (into which it has subsequently been subsumed). He was born just six months before the Battle of Sedan which opened the way for the rapid political unification of Germany, formally in January 1871. The outbreak of war forced the family to relocate to Idar-Oberstein in the hill country a short distance to the north of Saarbrücken. August's mother, Anna, died very soon after his birth. Nikolaus Merges, his father, was a butcher and the author of a teaching manual for journeyman butchers on making sausages and other meat products. The family came originally from the south-west of Germany, near the frontier north of Basel. Nikolaus Merges had been conscripted for military service, so the infant was sent to live with foster parents. While in foster-care he contracted Rickets, caused by malnutrition. As a result he never grew above 147 cm, was lame in one leg, and lived his life with a bent back. He would become known in some quarters as "Krummer August" (loosely, "bent August"). Fortunately his formidable mental abilities more than made up for his physical difficulties. After he grew up and took to public speaking, some thought him garrulous, others eloquent.

By the time he was six his father had brought the family back together, and he spent six years attending junior school at Idar-Oberstein. The family then moved away from the Saarbrücken area, settling in Melle (a short distance to the south-east of Osnabrück). August was keen to progress to secondary education, but there was not enough money for that: instead, in 1884, his father sent him away to Bremen to undertake an apprenticeship in tailoring.

=== Young socialist ===
He combined his apprenticeship with a passionate autodidacticism, reading voraciously on political and academic topics. It was also during this time in Bremen that he joined the Social Democratic Party (SPD), which until 1890 was operating under a legal ban. In practical terms, the ban was more widely accepted in some parts of Germany than in others. In the booming industrial port-city of Bremen socialism was already becoming well entrenched. By the time he completed his apprenticeship in 1886, Merges was already turning up at public meetings, speaking up for trades unionism and social democracy. He was sent to prison on more than one occasion, but his terms of incarceration were evidently relatively brief, and his eldest son's subsequent notes indicate that August Merges regarded prison as a necessary element in his personal activism.

After his apprenticeship he moved to Berlin where he pursued his study of tailoring at a vocation college. However, he became convinced that if he spent his life in tailoring it would only be a matter of time before his health was completely destroyed. There was still no question of being able to pursue higher education. Aged 21, and desperate to find an opening in politics, he wrote to the leading SPD Reichstag member, Georg von Vollmar, begging for help in finding him a way to an "academic education, in order to be able to devote himself to the socialist cause afterwards", and setting out his political abilities and experiences. The letter was kept, has been retained among Georg von Vollmar's papers, but there is no sign that its writer ever received an answer. Merges abandoned his course in Berlin and returned to Bremen where he supported himself as a wandering journeyman tailor. He continued with his programme of self-education: after his marriage he would work full-time for the party as an economist at their Alfeld (Hildesheim) trades union building.

=== Marriage ===
In 1899 he relocated to Delligsen, a small country town between Hanover and Göttingen, where he continued to work at tailoring and where, that same year, August Merges married Minna Hermes. Their son Alfred was born barely nine months later. Between 1901 and 1907 the marriage produced four more recorded children.

=== Socialist activism in a period of accelerating social and political tension ===
In 1906 he was finally able to abandon tailoring work, becoming instead a salaried party official, working in nearby Hildesheim and Alfeld. Two years later, in 1908, he was elected to membership of the Delligsen municipal council. He was by now gaining a reputation in the region as an effective political orator (or "agitator"). He took a leading role in Labour movement demonstrations, campaigning powerfully for democratic state elections, which meant campaigning against the contentious three-class franchise used in Prussia, whereby the 80% of voters paying the lowest amounts in tax had the same levels of influence in election results as the richest 5% paying the highest amounts. (The precise proportions varied slightly over time according to tax rates and levels of prosperity, but the underlying inequality would endure till 1918.)

In 1910 or 1911 August Merges relocated with his family to the city of Braunschweig, an important commercial and administrative centre for the region. Here he returned to his former trade, running a tailors' shop. He combined this with work as a promoter and contributing editor with "Der Volksfreund" (literally, "The Friend of the People". Founded in 1871, the "Volksfreund" was one of the longest established regional daily party newspapers anywhere in Germany. His written pieces, like his other political activity, marked him out as a representative of the more radical "left-wing" elements in the party. The overturning of "bourgeois capitalist society" was high on his political agenda throughout his political career.

=== Wartime Pacifist ===
War broke out in July 1914. Socialist activists in the affected countries were appalled to see "patriotism" trumping "internationalism" in the party leaderships. In Germany though not all) of the party's members of parliament backed their parliamentary leadership group by voting in favour of funding for the war. Among the membership, more than four years of war caused a steady increase in anti-war sentiment, as the deaths mounted in the battle zones and extreme hunger became commonplace in the cities. August Merges was among many left-wing members of the party who from the outset campaigned energetically against the "capitulation of social democracy" in 1914. Hostility to official party backing for the "imperialist war" triggered the rapid emergence of an implacable opposition faction among party activists inside the party. August Merges was prominent among them.

Early in 1915 Merges teamed up with Sepp Oerter and August Thalheimer to set up the "Braunschweiger Revolutionsclub" in pursuance of their political objectives. He was also close to the anti-war Spartacus League emerging in Berlin. His friendship with Thalheimer gave him a direct link to the movement's central leadership in Berlin: Thalheimer was a regular contributor to "Spartakusbriefe", the movement's newspaper, from 1916. The "Braunschweiger Revolutionsclub" comprised approximately fifteen members, all united in their opposition to the party leadership decision to support war funding. Roughly half of them were, like Merges, paid officials of the party or of trades unions linked to it. The others were young people from the "Bildungsverein jugendlicher Arbeiter und Arbeiterinnen" (loosely, "Young workers' education association"). Especially for these younger club members, August Merges was something of a role model. He was among the first to sign the letter of protest organised by Rosa Luxemburg and addressed by the Spartacus Leagues "International Group" to the SPD party executive on 9 June 1915 in which they demanded an end to party support for the war.

At the start of 1916 the "Braunschweiger Revolutionsclub" renamed itself "Spartakusgruppe Braunschweig". The group's influence and support inside the party continued to grow, and at party conferences and meetings it increasingly found itself sufficiently well represented to be able to determine the outcome of votes taken at the end of debates. In most businesses and factories in the region it was able to appoint "Vertrauensleute" (trusted Spartacus Group representatives). Towards the end of 1916 Merges found himself detained in "protective custody" because of his "anti-military activities against the war".

In 1917 the party finally split over the contentious issue of parliamentary party support in for war funding. In Braunschweig, where anti-war sentiment was particularly strong, a majority of party members transferred their memberships to the breakaway Independent Social Democratic Party ("Unabhängige Sozialdemokratische Partei Deutschlands") / USPD. Merges, by this time no longer in prison, was naturally among those switching to the USPD. He was in practice already a member of the Spartacus League and during 1918 also became actively engaged in the emerging International Communists of Germany ("Internationalen Kommunisten Deutschlands"), a short-lived anti-war group that had originated in Bremen, and which a few months later joined with other organisations at a three day congress held in Berlin between 30 December 1918 and 1 January 1919, to form the Soviet inspired Communist Party. During 1917/18 he also headed up "Deserteurzentrale", a group founded by the Spartakists that looked after army deserters, giving them shelter and providing them with (falsified) identity papers and (forged) food stamps.

=== Revolution ===
As the military lines in the west collapsed, and just over a week before war ended, on 3 November 1918 addressed a (n illegal) anti-war protest rally in Braunschweig attended by around (or at least: sources differ) 1,000 people. Participants had expected to be addressed by Karl Liebknecht, but Liebknecht had cancelled his visit at short notice, travelling instead that day to Kiel.

- "He was derided and despised, just a little tailor, almost too small to be noticed, and badly deformed physically. He was always smoking a cigar: his cigars never went out. When you were with him, he would ask, 'did you bring a cigar with you? Then we can talk'".
- "Er wurde verhöhnt und verpönt, daß er nur ein kleines Schneiderlein war, kaum sichtbar und schwer körperlich gelähmt; dauernd ’ne Zigarre rauchte, die Zigarre, die ging nicht aus bei ihm. Wenn man mit ihm zusammen war, dann frug er: haste denn ’ne Zigarre mitgebracht? Dann können wir uns mal unterhalten."

Herbert Wallbaum (a young socialist activist), 1918

- "In the Young Socialists we had particularly close contact with August Merges. It was astonishing just how much he brought to the whole business, and how astutely he could assess political developments. His speeches were all delivered "off the cuff". That was powerful! If someone called out with a heckle, he always knew just how to answer, instantly'".
- "Wir in der Arbeiterjugend hatten einen besonders guten Kontakt zu August Merges. Man mußte staunen, was der alles brachte und hier die politische Entwicklung beurteilen konnte. Er referierte immer aus dem Handgelenk. Schlagkräftig war der! Wenn einer einen Zwischenruf machte, dann wußte er immer gleich die Antwort drauf."

Wilhelm Hilger (a Communist Party member who experienced the "November revolution")

As a skilful and committed orator, endowed with strong strategic skills, August Merges had a huge influence on political developments in Braunschweig between the end of the war and the middle of 1919. During the early morning of 8 November 1918 the shops opened as usual and the housewives purchased their daily rations, while workers walked or took the tram to their usual workplaces. In the factories, workers found their Spartakist fellow-workers waiting for them, having arrived early. Four days after the outbreak of the naval mutiny in the northern ports, the factory workers' of Braunschweig were now invited to participate in a spectacular and meticulously choreographed series of events in the city centre. A little later, an armed group of USPD members appeared in the city centre at the building used for the production of the "Volksfreund" (SPD party newspaper) and took it over without difficulty or drama. The revolution would need a newspaper and a printing press. Sources describe this as the first significant revolutionary act undertaken by members of the USPD against the property of the residual so-called "majority SPD". Merges referred to a quasi-judicial party decision taken in April 1917, following the party split whereby, he recalled, the "Volksfreund" was promised to the breakaway party: the Braunschweig labour movement were simply taking back property that had been stolen from them. After the building had been seized, a number of soldiers remained in it, identifiable from their red armbands and the rifles slung over their shoulders. A table was placed in front of the main entrance. The sight of August Merges standing on it struck one sympathetic comrade as incongruous: the good little crippled August, who had never so much as killed a fly in his life, stood before the audience with a rifle secured in a large black case mounted on a stout belt. If the effect of his outfit invited mirth, there was nothing comical about the power of his demagogic eloquence. That day August Merges established his credentials for leadership of the November revolution, at least as far as Braunschweig was concerned.

At the end of the morning, at the request of Merges, a joint meeting of a new Braunschweig Soldiers' and Workers' soviets was convened. It was determined that a republican structure was necessary for the governance of a "Free State". Towards the end of the afternoon a delegation led by August Merges made their way to the ducal palace. After twenty minutes the last Duke Braunschweig signed and, without a word, handed back the abdication statement which had thoughtfully been prepared for him.

The Soldiers' and Workers' soviets were now in charge, under their chairman identified simply as "Husar Schütz". Husar Emil Schütz is thought to have been a former infantryman, like hundreds of thousands of others recently returned from the military defeat in France. Two days later, on 10 November 1918 the Socialist Republic of Braunschweig was proclaimed by the Soldiers' and Workers' soviets, to be administered by a USPD government. At the suggestion of Sepp Oerter, the soviets proclaimed August Merges as their president. It was in many ways the high-point of his political career. It is not clear how much consensus existed between members Soldiers' and Workers' soviets on the future government structure for the new Socialist Republic. It is therefore not clear whether August Merges was expected to be a hands-on executive president, or a presiding figure. Some sources indicate that "real power" was to be exercised on a day-to-day basis by the government council of eight "people's commissars". (Note: The eight initially appointed "people's commissars" of the Socialist Republic of Braunschweig were: * Minna Faßhauer (the only woman, and thereby according to some criteria Germany's first state-level minister), responsible for education and culture * Karl Eckardt, labour * Gustav Gerecke, food and nutrition * August Junke, Justice " Michael Müller, Trade and transport * Sepp Oerter, Finance and Interior (for the overall state of Braunschweig) * August Wesemeier, City of Braunschweig) August Merges proposed the creation of radical Soviet Republic, based on the Soviet model. His party comrade Sepp Oerter, whose opinion carried considerable weight, favoured a more parliamentary approach from the outset, advocating a directly elected state parliament to work alongside the eight "people's commissars". In any case, it was already clear that the November revolution in Braunschweig as part of a wider series of uprisings across Germany. The longer term objective for the workers' and soldiers' councils became the creation of a unified German republic into which Braunschweig would be absorbed. But the more immediate priority was the creation of a functioning economy and socialist state in Braunschweig. The draft electoral law adopted by the workers' and soldiers' councils of Braunschweig provided for equal and direct voting rights for all persons aged 20 or above, including even women. Provision was also made for voting in elections to be undertaken using a secret ballot. It was one of a number of important precedents.

- "...the peculiar mark of the first – and, it is to be hoped, last – President of the "Free State of Braunschweig" was what came out of his mouth, which was in inverse proportion to his [diminutive] size, a club foot and his "staff (walking stick) .... the Robespierre of the revolution in Braunschweig .... His vengefulness and blood thirstyness may not have been so pronounced and unnatural as with his French revolutionary precursor, but his vicious hatred of everything "bourgeois" is limitless bneyond any doubt".
- „[…] die besonderen Kennzeichen des ersten und hoffentlich letzten Präsidenten des Freistaates Braunschweig sind seine zu seinem Mundwerk in umgekehrtem Verhältnis stehende körperliche Größe, ein Klumpfuß und ein sogenannter ‚Ast‘ […] Robespierre der Braunschweiger Revolution […] Seine Rachsucht, sein Blutdurst mag vielleicht nicht so ausgeprägt und unnatürlich sein, wie die seines Kollegen aus der großen französischen Revolution, seine Schmähsucht und sein Haß gegen alles Bürgerliche ist aber zweifellos ohne Grenzen.“

"Teutonicus"

On 23 November 1918 Merges became a participant in the "Rat der Volksbeauftragten" (loosely, "Council of People's Representatives"), which was fulfilling some of the functions that would have been the responsibility of the German government, if there had been one in the aftermath of the resignation of Chancellor Max von Baden. When the assembly took a vote on 30 November 1918 to provide for elections to a new National Assembly mandated to devise a new constitution for a new kind of Germany, there were just two votes opposing the idea. One came from a member from Gotha called Geitner. The other opposing vote came from August Merges. The vote significantly raised the public profile of August Merges, who found himself pilloried in print as the "red dictator" in what his son would later call the "capitalist press". His objections, which reflected the radical concerns of many leading figures in the Braunschweig commissariat, were based on the marginalising of the workers' soviets and central involvement in the proposal of Friedrich Ebert of the SPD. The USPD leaders in Braunschweig had neither forgotten nor forgiven the 1914 "capitulation of social democracy" to the demands of an imperialist war. A national election for the National Assembly was held on 19 January 1919. The electorate now included everyone, regardless of gender, aged 20 or more. More than 30 million votes were cast: in the previous national election, held under a more restricted franchise in 1912, slightly more than 12 million votes had been cast. August Merges was one of two members elected from the "Braunschweig Socialist Republic". However, a month later he delivered a scathing speech attacking the national Ebert-Scheidemann government and the "betrayal of the revolution by parliamentarism". On 22 February 1919 he resigned both his seat in the National Assembly and renounced his presidency in the state government of the "Braunschweig Socialist Republic" (as it was still known). In Braunschweig, following state elections on 22 December 1918 in which no party had gained an overall majority in the new state parliament, the USPD was being forced to enter into coalition with the untrusted SPD.

The creation of the Communist Party at a congress in Berlin at the beginning of January 1919 had been the result of a coming together of various left-wing groupings, including a large number of defectors from the USPD. The Socialist Republic of Braunschweig was one of several regions in Germany, away from Berlin, where the USPD had remained strong, and the Communists were not yet able to attract significant levels of support from working class voters. On 25 January 1919 August Merges was elected chairman of the Braunschweig region USPD. This may have seemed a significant development, but larger forces were in play. During the first three months of 1919 the revolution continued to develop across Germany. Political differences were increasingly being played out on the streets: approximately three months after his election to the regional USPD party chairmanship, August Merges appears to have switched his own political allegiance to the Communist Party.

Despite his government involvement at least till 22 February, it is thought that Merges, was the leader of a number of local insurrections during the turbulent early months of 1919, though details of his involvement are hard to pin down. Meanwhile revolution encouraged counter-revolution: a succession of "Freikorps" (private armies) emerged, manned by (otherwise) unemployed former soldiers and organised by (otherwise) unemployed former generals, who had returned from the war disillusioned, powerfully nostalgic for the "good old days", and with a taste for violence. On 17 April 1919 General Georg Maercker appeared in Braunschweig with a large Freikorps unit in order to put down the general strike, which had been called by "extremist Spartakist elements" (almost certainly including August Merges) and was "causing chaos". Maercker was a pioneer of the post-war Freikorps movement and arrived with his reputation enhanced by his contribution to averting some soviet-style revolution in Berlin. It is only fair to add that one of Maercker's first public actions following his arrival in the "Socialist Republic of Braunschweig" involved nothing more brutish than holding a press conference. Fearing arrest, August Merges nevertheless went into hiding in Braunschweig, living "underground" (with his place of residence not registered at the city hall). At some point over the next few weeks he fled to Berlin.

=== Factionalism and fractiousness among the comrades ===
By the time of the Second Party Conference, held by the Communist Party in October 1919, August Merges was a party member. The conference took place shortly after the so-called March uprising in central Germany, at a time when the party had been banned, and it was accordingly held under conditions of illegality and secrecy: this means that details of what actually took place are in short supply. It took place in Heidelberg, and is generally referred to as the Heidelberg party conference, but it was also held in nearby Mannheim and at the Wachenburg Castle. August Merges took part. He did not hold back from spelling out his opposition to the insufficiently radical approach being taken by the national party leadership under Paul Levi, Clara Zetkin and Wilhelm Pieck.

During the early summer of 1920 Merges resigned from the Communist Party and became a founder member of the "anti-parliamentarian" Communist Workers' Party ("Kommunistische Arbeiter-Partei Deutschlands" / KAPD). He took most of the Braunschweig members of the Communist Party with him, and served very briefly as a member of the KAPD national party executive. Within the KAPD he was noted as a member of the so-called "federalist minority", calling for the dissolution of communist parties and the creation of "Unions". He was strongly hostile to any move towards a centralise organisation, and therefore also acutely suspicious of the recently launched Communist International.

=== Schöningen incident ===
On 15 March 1920 August Merges addressed a political rally at Schöningen, a small town to the east of Braunschweig, and along the main road towards Magdeburg. He had been invited to do this by an action committee of SPD, USPD and Communist Party members that had come together in response to the opening salvoes, in Berlin on 12/13 March, of the (ultimately unsuccessful) Kapp Putsch against Germany's republican government. The workforces at all the significant factories in Schöningen were already participating in a general strike, and the agricultural workers in at least 18 small towns and villages around Schöningen had already been on strike even before news came through of the antics of Wolfgang Kapp. Mergers gave a characteristically fiery speech. With a return to civil war a realistic prospect, the speech culminated with a call to disarm the Schöningen citizen militia, on the grounds that "the bourgeoisie do not need to be armed". After the speech Merges pulled together an apparently ad hoc "workers' commission": these men were tasked with demanding the surrender of the weapons of the citizen militia from Adolf Lindemann, its leader. Lindemann, who was also a town councillor, was in the town hall while this was going on: when he became aware of the demand that he should hand over the weapons he refused. A section of the demonstrators now stormed the town hall and extracted Lindemann, applying a combination of threats and physical encouragement. On the town hall steps he again refused to order the hand over of the weapons. Initially the crowd let him go free, but then others of them grabbed him and forced him to accompany them to the castle square ("Der Burgplatz"), where members of the citizen militia had already gathered in order to protect the weapons stored in the medieval castle. Merges now joined with Mayor Schelz to try and calm the mood and dissuade the angry crowd gathered outside the town hall from following Lindemann and his captors to the castle square, but many demonstrators refused to be put off. Fighting broke out: according to eye witness reports the number involved ranged between 500 and 900 people. The first shots were fired shortly after midday, and the first person to be killed was a militia man called Tankmar Eisfeld. In the end nine people were killed, and at least a further twenty suffered significant injuries.

August Merges did not accompany the demonstrators to the castle square, but instead, according to reports, "disappeared". It was not till after nightfall that government forces arrived, "narrowly averting a further bloodbath", according to at least one source. By 20.00 order had been restored. A number of arrests took place the next day, and although it is unclear just how long the soldiers remained in town, but it seems likely that they had departed by 26 March, the day on which the factory strikes in Schöningen following the resignation from the council of Lindemann and an amnesty for most of the after most of the demonstrator-suspects detained following the fighting.

Meanwhile there had been a further casualty at Schöningen on 16 March, when a militia commander was shot. A Colonel Stachow now issued an arrest warrant against August Merges, whom he considered culpable over the incidents: Merges had "incited the workers to disarm the legally established citizen militia .... as a result of which fighting and rioting had broken out, during which several people were wounded and killed". Despite an army search, August Merges managed to address a meeting at Schöppenstedt that same day. His audience of workers succeeded in preventing his arrest. It is not clear whether he was ever arrested in connection with the events at Schöningen during March 1920: if he was, he cannot have been detained for long. Sources do, in any case, mention that he was prosecuted several times in connection with his political involvements during the 1920s and early 1930s.

=== The Second World Congress of the Comintern ===
August Merges was characteristically unimpressed by what he saw during his visit to Moscow in 1920 to attend the Comintern Second World Congress:

- "Russia is certainly the country that was first with the social revolution, but it will be the last country that will implement socialism".
- "Rußland ist zwar das Land, das als erstes die soziale Revolution durchgeführt hat, es wird aber das letzte Land sein, das den Sozialismus durchführ"

August Merges:
the line was included in a number of political speeches Merges gave in various German cities after he returned home

In July 1920 it turned out that Merges might have set aside his misgivings about the Comintern sufficiently to travel to Moscow so as to attend the organisation's Second World Congress. He was to participate as one in a two man KAPD delegation, together with his party comrade Otto Rühle. Before the congress even opened Merges and Rühle took the opportunity of a preparatory meeting to object vociferously to the "guidelines on the basic tasks of the Communist International" which had been prepared by Karl Radek. The document had evidently been approved by all four comrades on the executive committee, which included not just Radek, but also Lenin, Bukharin and Zinoviev. Merges and Rühle inferred that acceptance of these ground rules was a pre-condition for attending the congress. The men from the KAPD objected to the centralised and bureaucratic structure on which Radek's guidelines were predicated. They objected to the idea of any sort of "power centre" for the Comintern. The organisational and structural assumptions underlying the congress preparations were, they asserted, opposed to the core values of the KAPD. Having stated their position, Merges and Rühle departed, and started on their return to Berlin. Before they had travelled very far, they received a renewed invitation to attend the congress, however, accompanied by an assurance that the KAPD delegation would enjoy full voting rights, and their participation would not be constrained by any preconditions. As far as can be determined, however, August Merges and Otto Rühle continued on their way home, without attending the congress itself.

Naturally the mainstream Communist Party of Germany had also sent a delegation. The KPD team was led by Paul Levi who at this stage was still the party leader. According to a letter which Merges received from a comrade who had remained in Moscow for long enough to attend the congress, "when Levi found out in Moscow that Rühle and Merges had been given full rights to give their opinions and join in the votes, Levi had delivered an ultimatum on behalf of his delegation: Levi's team would quit the congress if Rühle and Merges appeared!".

Merges and Rühle faced strong criticism from comrades over their behaviour while representing the party in Moscow during July and August 1920. Rühle was expelled from the (by now splintering) party in October 1920: it is possible that Merges was expelled at the same time. Nevertheless, Merges was present at the party conference at Gotha in February 1921, making a powerfully supportive intervention on behalf of Rühle. He contributed a second intervention at the conference on the "women question".

=== Radical involvement after 1921 ===
In October 1921 Merges was involved in setting up the unified "anti-parliamentarian anti-authoritarian" General Labour Union ("Allgemeine Arbeiter-Union"/ AAU), a radical communist which, it was reported, combined the political and economic aspirations of communist workers in a single organisation. The idea was to replace the squabbling splintering parties of the far-left in Germany (and possibly internationally) with a single political and operational entity. In Braunschweig, along with Merges, the AAU gained approximately twenty members, including the former people's commissioner for education and culture during the early months of the "Socialist Republic of Braunschweig", Minna Faßhauer. Merges and Faßhauer also both involved themselves with the anarcho-syndicalist Free Workers' Union (" Freie Arbeiter Union") / FAU, appearing as guest speakers at FAU meetings. In addition, according to a biographical report submitted to East Germany's Institute for Marxism-Leninism by Alfred Merges, his son, in 1958, during this period Merges became "very active on behalf of Red Aid", a workers' welfare organisation, widely (and almost certainly correctly) believed to have close ties with Moscow.

In 1926 Merges was a co-founder of the "Spartakusbund linkskommunistischer Organisationen" (known more simply as the "Spartakus League Nbr. 2"). That year he chaired its first (and only) national conference. which took place on 20/21 November in Göttingen. "Spartakus League Nbr. 2" was a coming together of various "Soviet" communist and syndicalist groups. During the later 1920s Merges pulled back from political activism. His son later recalled that August and Minna Merges lived in very basic conditions. August still sometimes undertook tailoring work in order to earn some money and / or in order to help out a comrade. Meanwhile his eldest son Alfred spent much of the decade living "underground" after escaping from jail, in 1923, having been convicted on account of his own political activism, involving "violation of the Explosives Law".

=== Under Hitler ===
The Hitler government took power in January 1933 and quickly transformed Germany into a one- party dictatorship. Merges immediately wrote a political pamphlet with the title "Hitler bedeutet Krieg und Untergang" ("Hitler means war and downfall"), which his son Walter and a comrade called Oswald Berger printed and then distributed in front of the Braunschweig labour exchange. Even during those early years of Hitlerism, August and Minna Merges were subjected to numerous house searches by the security services, and many of August's books were confiscated.

German unemployment exceeded six million in the wake of the Great Depression, representing a record 30% level just before the National Socialists took over the country, but during 1933 and 1934 economic conditions improved rapidly, both out of deference to the economic cycle and on account of rampant government spending supported by deficit funding. The post-democratic Hitler government, during the early years of its rule, was popular even among many working class voters who under other circumstances might have been tempted by state communism. August Merges and his long-standing activist ally Minna Faßhauer very soon became convinced that talk of a communist revolution under circumstances in which the masses were not wishing to listen would amount simply to "banging one's head against the wall and creating martyrs". Younger AAU comrades, such as Hermann Schade, took a less defeatist approach. August Merges was still a magnet for ambitious young revolutionaries. Many, possibly at the prompting of Schade, gathered around him in order to plan and carry out "anti-Nazi actions". The "Schade resistance group" – as this emerging "council communist union" called itself – developed its ideas out of sight, at least in the short term, implementing a self-imposed ban on "outwardly visible actions". Along with members of the AAU, it als attracted people who had been Communist Party and SPD members before 1933, as well as young people who had not previously been "politically organised". In 1934 the group began to show its hand, producing a number of political pamphlet with titles such as "Kampfsignal" (loosely, "Battle call"), "Der Rote Rebell" and "Die braune Pest" ("The brown – i.e. Nazi – plague"). These were distributed in and around Braunschweig, presumably left in small piles at tram stops or railway stations, on park benches and bandstands, or in public toilets; wherever those interested might find them. August Merges undoubtedly was one of those working on these anti-government publications.

In December 1934 four members of the group were arrested by the police. Six or sixteen more arrests followed in April 1935. Sources differ as to whether August Merges was one of those arrested in April, or whether he was arrested only a few weeks later, on 27 May 1935. During his lengthy interrogation sessions by members of the security services he was subjected to serious physical abuse, suffering pelvic and spinal fractures. According to his son he was unable to stand up after the torture, According to at least one source the extent and duration of his suffering was intensified because, during his detention, treatment of his injuries was forbidden.

Merges faced trial, with others, at the district high court in Braunschweig early in October 1935. Found guilty of "high treason", on 7 October he was given a three year prison term. He served some of his time in the infamous jail at Wolfenbüttel. He was also detained for some time at Fuhlsbüttel, near Hamburg. Here he was identified and derided as one of the "November [1918/19] criminals": he was subjected to further physical torture. According to his son his weight sank to 74 European pounds (37 kg or 82 Anglo-American pounds) On 27 December 1937 Merges was released, having been deemed unfit for further imprisonment ("... wegen Haftunfähigkeit"). Following his release he was immediately taken into "protective custody" on the personal orders of Braunschweig's National Socialist Minister-President, Dietrich Klagges. However, his son Alfred petitioned the People's Court on his behalf, successfully obtaining a conditional release. The conditions amounted to house arrest, in that Merges was not to leave his registered place of residence, and was forbidden from receiving visitors. August Merges would remain under close security service surveillance for the rest of his life, and was subjected to regular, albeit from now on always brief, further periods of detention at the hands of the security services.

In 1943 or 1944 his wife and son Alfred managed to have August Merges relocated to the hut on the family allotment. This seems to have been located where it was easier for his family to look after him, and the allotment hut was sufficiently robust to constitute suitable sleeping accommodation. The allotment was bordered by a civilian internment camp, and he was able to strike up some sort of a relationship with one or two of the Polish and Soviet internees in it, as well as with several "reliable" (presumably politically reliable as in communist and untainted by National Socialism) German comrades. He was nevertheless still subject to surveillance, and Gestapo officers frequently turned up without warning. By 1945 it was widely accepted that the war would be won by the Soviet Union and its western allies, but August Merges did not survive long enough to experience that fearsome liberation. On 6 March 1945 his wife found him dead in the allotment garden in which he lived.

== Celebration ==
Ever since he emerged on the political stage, August Merges had numerous admirers on the extreme left of the political spectrum. A memorial on behalf of the political mainstream came in 1992, a couple of year after reunification, when his name was included on the "Reichstag Memorial" to the 96 members of the parliament who died "unnaturally" during the twelve Hitler years. However, the memorial indicates that he died in the prison at Wolfenbüttel. That is incorrect. He died in the hut on his son's allotment garden, which is where he was living at the time. Wolfenbüttel prison is nevertheless relevant, since it was one of a number of institutions in which he suffered the physical abuse at the hands of the authorities which caused his early death.
