= Anton Franzen =

German Nazi Party politician

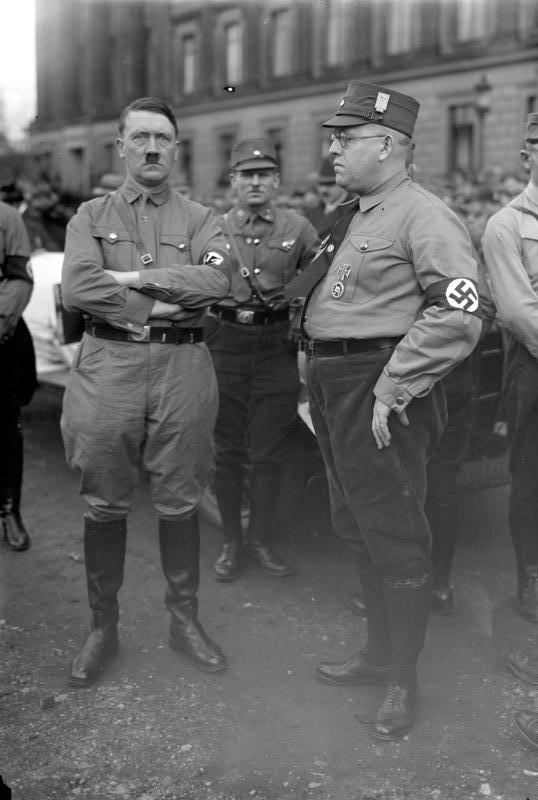
- Anton Franzen (right) with Adolf Hitler in Braunschweig (1931)

Minister of the Interior and Public Education Free State of Brunswick
- In office 1 October 1930 – 27 July 1931
- Minister-president: Werner Küchenthal
- Preceded by: Gustav Steinbrecher(Interior); Hans Sievers (Public Education)
- Succeeded by: Dietrich Klagges

Personal details
- Born: 9 April 1896 Schleswig, Province of Schleswig-Holstein, Kingdom of Prussia, German Empire
- Died: 16 May 1968 (aged 72) Kiel, Schleswig-Holstein, West Germany
- Party: Nazi Party
- Education: Kiel University; University of Hamburg; Humboldt University of Berlin
- Profession: Judge

Military service
- Allegiance: German Empire
- Branch/service: Imperial German Army
- Years of service: 1914–1918
- Rank: Leutnant
- Battles/wars: World War I
- Awards: Iron Cross, 1st and 2nd class Wound Badge

Anton Leonhard Franzen (9 April 1896 – 16 May 1968) was a German lawyer and politician of the Nazi Party. On 1 October 1930, he became the first Nazi to serve as a state government minister in the Free State of Brunswick. During his tenure as Minister of the Interior and Public Education, he attempted to remove the Party's political opponents and to pack the police and educational systems with Nazis. He resigned on 27 July 1931 and left politics, returning to the practice of law.

== Early life ==
Franzen was born in Schleswig and attended the Schleswig Cathedral School. He volunteered for military service with the Imperial German Army during the First World War and was promoted to Leutnant in the reserves. He served as a company commander, was wounded three times and was awarded the Iron Cross, 1st class and the Wound Badge. At the end of the war, he was discharged from the army and studied law at Kiel University, the University of Hamburg and the Humboldt University of Berlin. He was awarded a doctorate in law and completed the two required state legal examinations in 1921 and 1924. He initially worked as a corporate counsel for a trading company from 1924 to 1926 before being appointed as a magistrate and a district judge in 1926 and 1928, respectively. On 1 July 1928, Franzen joined the Nazi Party in Kiel (membership number 91,504). He was elected as a deputy to the Reichstag on 14 September 1930 from electoral constituency 13 (Schleswig-Holstein).

== Brunswick State Minister ==
In the state elections in the Free State of Brunswick on 14 September 1930, the Social Democratic government received 41% of the vote and lost its majority in the Brunswick Landtag. The conservative electoral bloc headed by the German National People's Party (DNVP) won 26% and the Nazi Party 22% of the vote. Adolf Hitler's price for joining in a coalition government with the conservatives was the ministries of the interior and public education. He was interested only in those agencies of practical use in furthering the Party's grip on power, with the chief aim of controlling the police power of the state. Hitler's personal choice to head the ministries was Franzen, who was an outsider to Brunswick.

On 30 September 1930, a right-wing coalition government was formed under Minister-president Werner Küchenthal of the DNVP. The Nazis joined the government and Franzen received the combined office of State Minister of the Interior and Public Education. He thus became the second Nazi official in Germany to achieve a state cabinet appointment, after Wilhelm Frick in Thuringia. However, after Frick was removed from office on a no confidence vote on 1 April 1931, Franzen remained the sole Nazi in a state executive office.

In his powerful new position, Franzen began a purge of Social Democratic police officers, professors, school administrators and teachers, dismissing them from public service and filling the posts with Nazi and DNVP members. In April 1931, a two-day student strike was held to protest the actions. Franzen responded on 12 June by issuing over 1,000 two or three days jail sentences for the parents of the striking students.

At this time, the national government of Heinrich Brüning was governing by emergency decrees that were opposed by the Nazi Party. On 27 July 1931, Franzen resigned from his ministerial office, publicly claiming to be stepping down in protest to what he termed the "Brüning dictatorship", though it was alleged at the time that Franzen was forced out due to dissatisfaction inside the Nazi Party with the moderation of his rule.

His departure briefly left no Nazis in any state cabinet post in Germany until he was succeeded by fellow Nazi Dietrich Klagges. Leaving politics, Franzen quit the Nazi Party on 1 September 1931, resigned his seat in the Reichstag on 18 September and resumed employment as a lawyer in Kiel. He became a district court councilor in 1932 and the regional court director in 1937. There are few details of his subsequent life, and he died in Kiel in 1968.

== Sources ==
- Anton Franzen entry in the Acts of the Reich Chancellery, Weimar Republic
- Flammer, Thomas (2013). Nationalsozialismus und katholische Kirche im Freistaat Braunschweig 1931-1945. Kommission für Zeitgeschichte. ISBN 978-3-506-77686-0.
- Henning, Rosemarie: Dr. Anton Franzen in: Jarck, Horst-Rüdiger & Scheel, G. (eds.): (1996) Braunschweigisches biographisches Lexikon: 19. und 20. Jahrhundert, Hahnsche, p. 186, ISBN 3-775258-38-8.
- Information about Anton Franzen in the Reichstag database
