= Gerhard Landmann =

German businessman and SS member

Gerhard Landmann (6 May 1904 - 29 June 1933) was a German businessman and SS member. He came to wider prominence after he was shot dead.

== Life ==
Gerhard Landmann was born in Braunschweig. His father was a buildings inspector. Landmann trained for a commercial career and then had various jobs. At one stage he was a candidate for a job with the city council. Long before 1933 he joined the Nazi Party, and in 1932 he joined its quasi-military wing, identified in sources as the SS (Schutzstaffel / "Protection Squadron").

On the night of 29/30 June 1933 Landmann was involved in a manhunt in Braunschweig's working-class quarter designed to find people involved in the production and distribution of (illegal) Communist Party leaflets. A shoot-out occurred and Landmann was shot dead. It was subsequently established that the fatal shot had been fired by "his own people" - possibly a "plainclothes SS man". Nevertheless, a Communist Party member called Alfred Staats later confessed to the killing.

Spotting an opportunity, the state government under the leadership of Dietrich Klagges immediately blamed the killing of Landmann on "the communists". Landmann was quickly raised to heroic status, and received an elaborate state funeral in the cathedral on 4 July 1933. On the day of the funeral the police chief, Friedrich Jeckeln, selected ten communist prisoners from the several hundred who had been rounded up after Landmann's killing and had them transported to a confiscated trades union building that the SS were planning to convert into a concentration camp in nearby Rieseberg (Helmstedt). The prisoners were already suffering from the effects of physical abuse, and after further torture, roughly an hour before midnight, the ten were shot dead on Jeckeln's orders, and in accordance with his proclaimed motto "ten for one".

Although the Rieseberg Murders were widely publicised, they were only one part of a wider backlash that the authorities choreographed following the killing of Gerhard Landmann. Under the cover of what was presented as a police manhunt a brutal wave of arrests and persecutions was launched, which later came to be known as the "Landmann Wave" ("Landmann-Welle"). Several hundred "special court" trials ensued. In August 1933 the city authorities erected a memorial tablet dedicated to Gerhard Landmann. In January 1934 the "House of the Friends of the People" ("Volksfreund-Haus"), a former regional head office and publishing building that the Nazis had confiscated from the SPD early in 1933, was rechristened as the Gerhard Landmann House, although other sources indicate that it had by that time already been known less formally by that name since July of the previous year. (It would revert to its pre-1933 name in 1945.)
