= Sepp Oerter =

German politician and journalist (1870–1928)

Minister President of the Free State of Brunswick
- In office 1920 – 24 November 1921

Personal details
- Born: Friedrich Josef Oerter; 24 September 1870 Straubing, Lower Bavaria, Germany
- Died: 14 December 1928 (aged 58) Braunschweig, Free State of Brunswick, Germany
- Party: SPD; USPD; NSDAP
- Occupation: Book binder Political activist Politician; Journalist

Sepp Oerter (24 September 1870 – 14 December 1928) was a German politician and journalist. As a young man he was an activist member of various anarchist groups. He later moved over to socialist groupings and parties, including the Social Democratic Party (SPD) and, after the SPD split, the anti-war Independent Social Democratic Party ("Unabhängige Sozialdemokratische Partei Deutschlands" / USPD). During and directly after the revolution, for two months during the first half of 1919 and then for more than a year during 1920/21, he served as head of the regional government / Minister-president in the Free State of Braunschweig (Brunswick). By the time of his death he had broken with the political left and joined the Nazis.

== Biography ==
=== Provenance and early years ===
Josef "Sepp" Oerter was born in Straubing, the small town at the heart of the fertile Gäuboden region of Lower Bavaria, to the north-east of Munich. His father was a Bavarian "Feldwebel" (junior army officer). While he was still young the family moved to nearby Furth which is where he grew up. After leaving school he completed an apprenticeship as a book binder. He joined the Social Democratic Party ("Sozialdemokratische Partei Deutschlands" / SPD) in 1887, but left it in 1890 after a radical youth group which he had supported was expelled from party. Together with his elder brother, Fritz Oerter (1869-1935), he now turned towards anarchist politics.

=== Anarchist years ===
By the early 1890s he had moved away from Bavaria and, with his brother, was working in Duisburg. Together the brothers smuggled subversive anarchist literature into Germany from the Netherlands. Coming under increasing police pressure, and taking his cue from a number of other anarchist comrades in a similar predicament, early in 1892 he fled to the United States of America. On his arrival at New York he met up with the circle around Emma Goldman, Alexander Berkman, and politically like-minded comrades from Germany. Sepp Oerter discovered in himself a talent for activism, turning out to have a flair for public speaking. During 1892 he was also the editor of the New York version of Der Anarchist, published by the "Radical Workers' Association" ("Radikaler Arbeiter Bund") and the "Autonomy" group which also numbered among its members Josef Peukert. The stay in America was cut short, however. The authorities suspected that Oerter had somehow been involved in Alexander Berkman's attempt to assassinate a wealthy businessman called Henry Clay Frick. Those suspicions appear not to have been entirely unfounded. With financial assistance from Emma Goldman, Sepp Oerter returned to Germany. He travelled via London where he arrived in October, and where the editorial group publishing "Autonomy" gave him a mission to take printed material across Belgium to the German frontier in order to effect a clandestine introduction of the anarchist propaganda to Germany. Sepp Oerter was able to complete his mission with the help of his brother Fritz who had stayed behind when Sepp had escaped to America.

Returning to Duisburg it might have been prudent to avoid drawing the attention of the authorities to the fact that he was back in town, but this was not Sepp Oerter's habit. In December 1892 he attended a public meeting in the city, to which he had been able to bring his anarchist propaganda material: he told the comrades present about his experiences in America and in England. This led to an intervention by police officials who were present. Fritz Oerter was arrested at the meeting. Sepp managed to escape, but he was not sufficiently familiar with the back streets of Duisburg to avoid detection, and he was arrested soon afterwards on one of the bridges over the Rhine. The brothers were detained on account their "insurrectionist speeches" ("aufrührerischer Reden") at the meeting. The criminal indictment they faced included "calling for explosives attacks". Sepp Oerter was sentenced in a court at Mainz to a two-year prison term. Subsequently, in October 1893, the sentence was extended from two years to eight years, presumably because of a denunciation on respect of his involvement in smuggling anarchist literature over the border. He served his sentence in the prison at Münster. (Fritz Oerter also received a prison sentence, but he was locked up only for one year.)

Released at the end of the eight-year term of detention Oerter went to Berlin where, with his brother, he was a member of what would become the Free Workers' Union of Germany ("Freie Arbeiter-Union Deutschlands" / FAUD). He was part of the editorial team working on the FAUD publication, "Der Freie Arbeiter". He also continued to deliver political speeches, both in Germany and abroad. In August 1907 he participated at the International Anarchist Congress of Amsterdam. At some point between his release in 1902 and 1908 he also found time to produce an autobiography covering his time in prison.

In 1908 Sepp Oerter lost his various political after it "became known" that in the course of his work on "Der Freie Arbeiter" he had engaged in embezzlement. Personal rivalries and the "Henri Boinville affair" also played their part in his sudden fall from grace among the comrades. While his brother Fritz remained faithful to political anarchism, Sepp Oerter abruptly quit the FAUD and abandoned his anarchist ideals. After that he began to write for various "Bourgeois" (not anarchist) newspapers. He became a social-democrat. In 1913 he even joined the Social Democratic Party ("Sozialdemokratische Partei Deutschlands" / SPD).

=== Social Democrat years and the move to Braunschweig ===
As an active SPD member Sepp Oerter worked for Vorwärts, the party's principal daily newspaper. The next year, in July 1914, war broke out and he became a member of the advisory board ("Beiratsmitglied") to the "Youth Training Associations" ("Jugendbildungsvereine") for the Greater Berlin region. In 1916 he moved from Berlin to Braunschweig, which is where he would achieve a personal breakthrough politically, and where he would live for the rest of his life. The purpose of the move was to take over as editor in chief at the Braunschweiger Volksfreund, the SPD's regional newspaper. The Volksfreund was unusual among the SPD's various national and regional newspapers in that it had always opposed uncompromisingly the decision of the party leadership back in 1914 not to vote against funding for the war in the Reichstag (Germany's national parliament). Even if other party newspapers had, with varying levels of enthusiasm, backed what had become known as the leadership's "Burgfriedenspolitik" parliamentary strategy, that decision not to oppose war funding had been contentious within the party membership from the outset. By 1916 the politically important state of Braunschweig was a focus of activity for the Spartacus League, an increasingly powerful anti-war movement operating, initially, inside the SPD. The exclusion of leading Spartacists from the party hastened a split. Sepp Oerter was a leading figure among the many left-wing SPD members who in 1917 switched to the new Independent Social Democratic Party ("Unabhängige Sozialdemokratische Partei Deutschlands" / USPD).

=== Braunschweig ===
During the final summer of the war, in 1918, Oerter briefly worked on the Leipziger Volkszeitung. He returned to Braunschweig in the late autumn/fall, arriving on the evening of 8 November 1918. A few hours earlier August Merges, a powerful orator, agitator and political ally who was also potentially a political rival, had succeeded in forcing the abdication of Duke Ernest Augustus, heretofore the Duke of Braunschweig, and the final reigning member of the Houses of Welf and Hanover. Braunschweig was now coming under the control of a local Workers' and Soldiers' Soviet. The Braunschweig uprising was part of a wave of revolution across the German cities and towns, triggered by military collapse and a mutiny in the German navy.

During the ensuing months of power shifts between Soviet-council republicanism and parliamentary governance Oerter played a leading political role locally, having emerged as a leader of the Braunschweig Workers' and Soldiers' Soviet. Some sources describe him as "chairman", while elsewhere he is identified as one of several "Volkskommissare" ("People's Commissioners"). Approximately two months after the election of December 1918, on 22 February 1919 a minority coalition government for Braunschweig was constructed under his chairmanship, containing members of the USPD and of the "majority" SPD (as the SPD was sometimes known for a few years following the SPD/USPD split). As well as chairing the cabinet, he also held the "Finance" and "Internal Affairs" portfolios. This administration lasted till the end of April 1919 by which time a clear preference for a parliamentary structure had been established. The Workers' and Soldiers' Soviet retained a constitutional right of veto "only in the event of conflict", whereupon a referendum would be held to arbitrate the question at issue. Sepp Oerter's "Worker's Council administration" would later be characterised by Heinrich Jasper, a political rival, as the "dictatorship by an undemocratic minority" ("Diktatur einer undemokratischen Minderheit"). The administration resigned at the end of April 1919 in an atmosphere of resurgent crisis, with a general strike in the city and a brief invasion and take-over by an ad hoc alliance of Freikorps militias under the leadership of General Georg Maercker. A new coalition government, now headed up by Heinrich Jasper of the SPD, was elected and installed by the Landtag (regional parliament) at the end of April 1919.

Thanks to his aggressive rhetoric and skills as a political tactician Sepp Oerter continued to be seen as one of the most important Braunschweig politicians at this time, although those same qualities also ensured a steady stream of political attacks from all sides. The second Landtag (regional parliament) election was held on 16 June 1920. The SPD and the Democratic (moderate liberal-left) Party (DDP) suffered significant losses and the USPD experienced major gains, becoming by far the largest single party in the regional parliament, with more than 37% of the vote. Oerter became Minister-president of the new government. His time at the top lasted little more than a year and he had only limited success in implementing his programme: the USPD was obliged to govern in coalition with the SPD. Nevertheless, sources insist that he continued to enjoy high levels of popularity with working-class voters.

Much of the energy of the USPD Braunschweig branch as they exercised their Landtag mandate was taken up with internal party disagreements that were raging nationally. Issues of the moment included whether or not the party should join the Moscow sponsored Communist International ("Comintern") and whether the time had come for the USPD to merge with the recently formed Communist Party of Germany. Within the Braunschweig party leadership team ("Bezirksleitung"), Oerter lined up with Rudolf Löhr on the side of Arthur Crispien. That meant opposition to Carl Eckardt who in the Braunschweig party branch championed Comintern membership and would later transfer to a version of the Communist Party. Oerter believed that the underlying principles of the USPD and of the Comintern were incompatible, and advocated closer cooperation with the SPD "Second International", for tactical reasons.

=== Exclusion from the USPD and membership of NSDAP ===
During 1921 Oerter faced allegations of corruption and of deriving personal benefit from public office. On 24 November 1921 he was obliged to resign as Minister-president. His younger party comrade Otto Grotewohl took over the post. A few months later, in the first part of 1922, Oerter was expelled from the USPD because of these same allegations. There are suggestions that he avoided a prison sentence for corruption only because of a general amnesty which the government implemented, keen to avoid a return to more widespread insurrection. Between 1922 and 1924 Oerter continued to sit as a member of the Landtag (regional parliament), now without party affiliation. According to one source he joined the Nazi Party in January 1924. Elsewhere it is stated that in 1925 he stood (unsuccessfully) for re-election to the Landtag as an SPD candidate. After 1925 he withdrew from active politics. He died in 1928 due to a heart attack. His obituary, compiled by Erich Mühsam was published in the anarchist journal, Fanal.
