= Free State of Brunswick =

German state (1918–1946)

Free State of Brunswick Freistaat Braunschweig (German)
- State of Germany
- 1918–1946
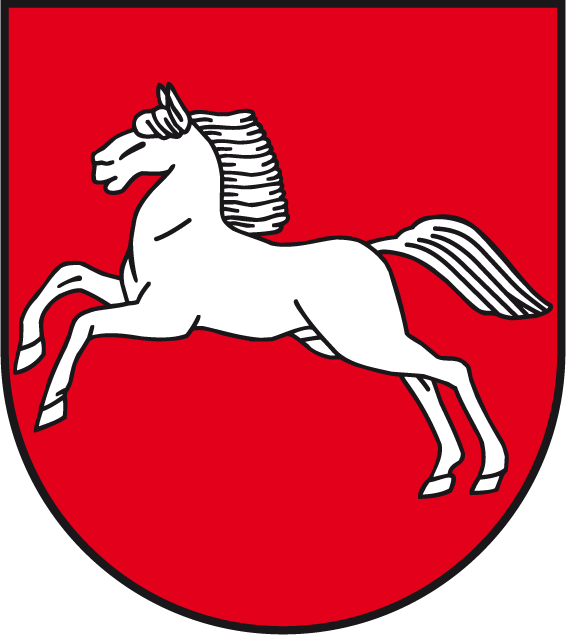
- Flag Coat of arms

- The Free State of Brunswick within the Weimar Republic
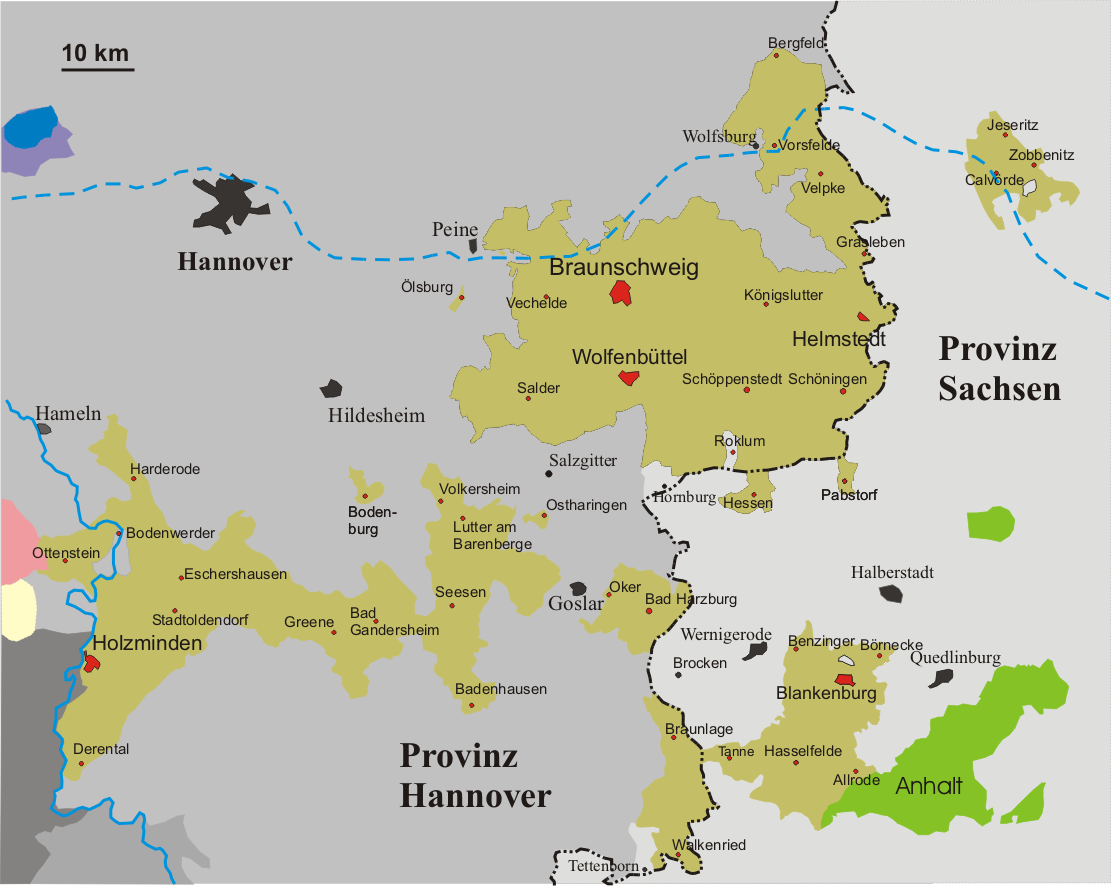
- Territory of Brunswick (shown here with the post-World War II inner German border between East and West Germany)
- Capital: Braunschweig (Brunswick)
- Government
  - Type: Republic (until 1933); National Socialist one-party totalitarian dictatorship (1933–1945)
- Council Chairman
  - 1918–1919: Sepp Oerter
  - 1919–1920: Heinrich Jasper
- Minister-President
  - 1919–1920 (first): Heinrich Jasper
  - 1946 (last): Alfred Kubel
- Legislature: Landtag
- Historical era: Interwar period
  - Established: 10 November 1918
  - Abolition de facto: 14 October 1933
  - Disestablished: 1 November 1946
Preceded by	Succeeded by
Duchy of Brunswick	Lower Saxony; Saxony-Anhalt (1945–1952)
- Today part of: Germany

The Free State of Brunswick (German: Freistaat Braunschweig) was a German state during the Weimar Republic (1918–1933) and Nazi Germany (1933–1945). It was formed after the abolition of the Duchy of Brunswick in the early days of the German revolution of 1918–1919. Its capital was Braunschweig (Brunswick). The Free State was de facto abolished under the Nazis in 1933 and formally disestablished in November 1946, after the Second World War. Most of its territory became part of the new state of Lower Saxony, with two small areas going to Saxony-Anhalt.

Like most of Germany, Brunswick went through a period of unrest after the end of World War I. The last duke of Brunswick, Ernest Augustus, abdicated peacefully in November 1918, some violence continued into 1919 before the supporters of a republican state won out over members of the far left who wanted Brunswick to become a council republic. The Social Democrats were generally the strongest party in Brunswick's single-chamber parliament and provided the majority of its minister-presidents. The Nazi Party began gaining strength in 1930 and attained full control in 1933.

== Predecessor state ==
The Free State of Brunswick was the successor state of the Duchy of Brunswick, one of the 25 constituent states of the German Empire. The territory of the Duchy consisted of a number of non-contiguous areas, most of them surrounded by the Kingdom of Prussia's provinces of Hanover and Saxony. Its boundaries did not change when it became the Free State.

The representative body of the Duchy of Brunswick was a parliament of the estates (Ständeparlament) in which representatives were chosen under census suffrage, a system that gave different weights to votes according to the person's income or rank in society. In Brunswick, a defined number of members were elected from groups that included the highest-taxed citizens, Lutheran clergy, municipalities and rural communities. Under the Empire's more liberal voting rules, Brunswick elected a number of members of the Social Democratic Party to the imperial Reichstag beginning in 1890, but none were able to win a seat in Brunswick's parliament.

The last duke of Brunswick was Ernest Augustus of the House of Hanover, who ruled from 1 November 1913 to 8 November 1918. He was married to Emperor Wilhelm II's only daughter, Princess Victoria Luise of Prussia.

== Revolution of 1918 ==
In the final days of World War I, the revolution of 1918 brought down the German Empire and all of Germany's royal houses, including that of the Duchy of Brunswick. The revolution began at the end of October 1918 with a sailors' mutiny at Kiel. The rebellious sailors set up a workers' and soldiers' council and in early November spread the revolt across the rest of Germany. Councils quickly took power from the existing military, royal and civil authorities with little resistance or bloodshed. In the face of the spreading revolution, Emperor Wilhelm II fled to Holland on 10 November.

Brunswick had become a center of left-wing activity before the outbreak of the revolution. In 1917, when the radical left wing of the Social Democratic Party (SPD) split away to form the Independent Social Democratic Party (USPD), the majority of party members in Brunswick went with it. On 2 November 1918, August Merges, a leader in the local branch of the USPD and an early member of the communist Spartacus League, organized a mass demonstration in the city. Five days later, and two days before the revolution reached Berlin, insurgents stormed the prison, occupied the railway station and police headquarters, and attacked Brunswick Palace. A quickly formed workers' and soldiers' council chose Merges as its leader. On 8 November, as a crowd of 20,000 protesters approached the palace, the council forced Duke Ernest Augustus to abdicate for himself and his descendants. He was the first of the German monarchs to abdicate; even Emperor Wilhelm II had not yet done so. Ernest Augustus went into exile in Gmunden, Austria.

The Duke's early abdication helped allow the revolution in the state of Brunswick to remain largely peaceful. On 10 November, the workers' and soldiers' council declared the Socialist Republic of Brunswick and formed a council of the people's deputies (Rat der Volksbeauftragten) to govern it. All nine of the council's members were from the USPD, and the majority were Spartacists. Merges was chosen president, with Sepp Oerter heading the ministries of the interior and of finance and Minna Fasshauer, who was one of the Spartacists, at the ministry of education. Fasshauer was the first woman to head a German state ministry.

The council of the people's deputies quickly enacted a number of major new laws. It established a Red Guard, later renamed the People's Army (Volkswehr), to keep order and defend the revolution, instituted an eight-hour working day and unemployment benefits, eliminated censorship, expropriated the ducal estates and eliminated church oversight of the schools. It declared that the function of the workers' and soldiers' councils was "to prepare and monitor the realization of the socialist revolution". At the same time, it called a for civil servants to stay in their positions.

=== First Landtag election ===
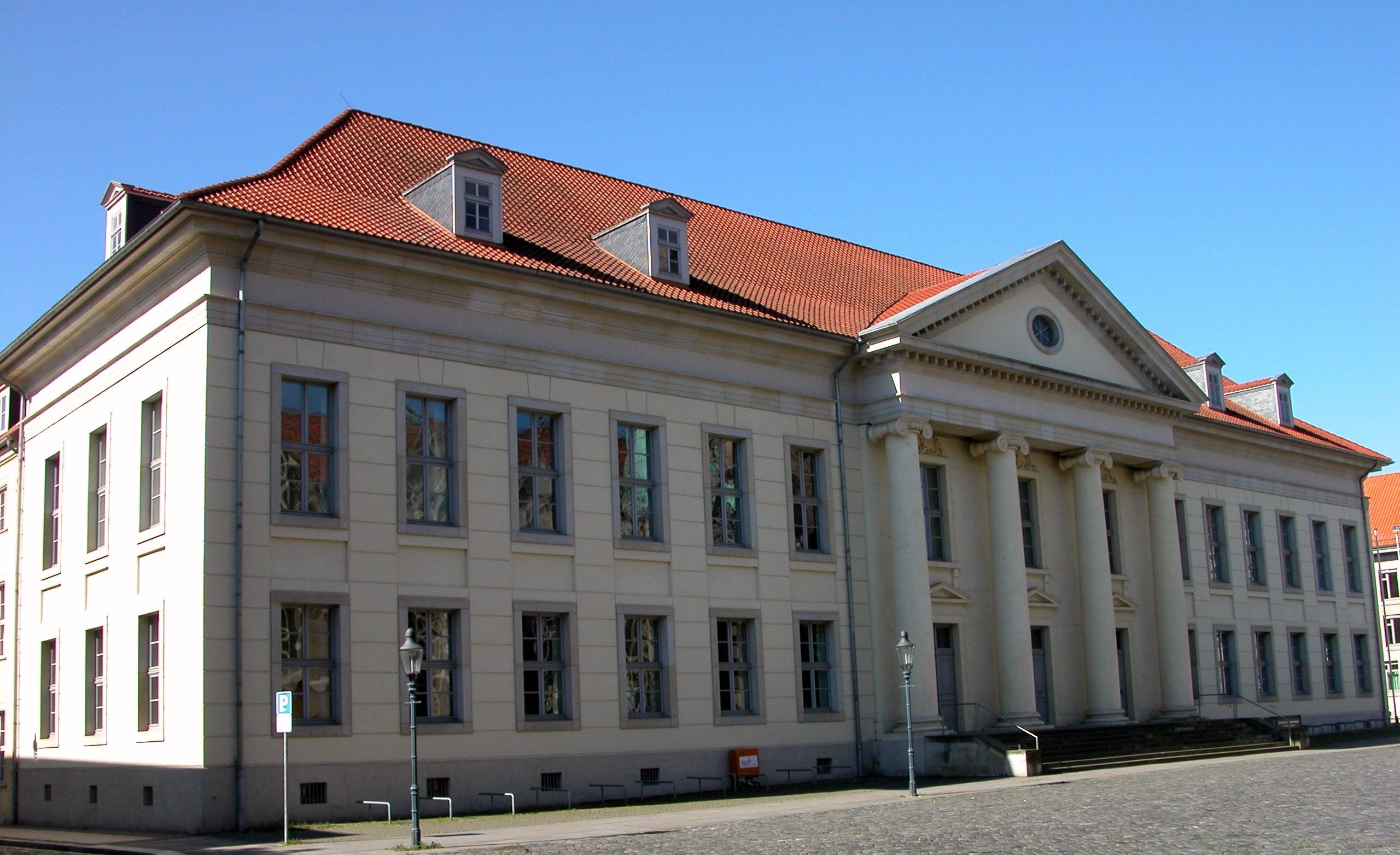
Brunswicks's Landtag building

In the December 1918 election for the new Brunswick Landtag (state parliament), the franchise was universal, equal and direct. The moderate Social Democratic Party (SPD) won 17 seats, the Brunswick State Electoral Association (BLWV) 16, the USPD 14 and the liberal German Democratic Party 13. The BLWV was an alliance of three conservative middle-class parties: the German People's Party (DVP), German National People's Party (DNVP) and the Welf-oriented Brunswick-Lower Saxony Party (BNP).

The new Landtag met for the first time on 10 February 1919. The president of the workers' and soldiers' council presented a proposal for a governmental program and a draft constitution. The Landtag elected a coalition government made up of members of the SPD and USPD under the leadership of Sepp Oerter. It passed a preliminary constitution which gave the workers' and soldiers' council veto power over the Landtag's actions.

=== Parliamentary vs. soviet republic ===
An election in late March for a state-wide workers' council gave the USPD a two-thirds majority of the seats. Differences over whether Brunswick should become a parliamentary or soviet republic then caused a split among the socialists that resulted in the founding of a Brunswick branch of the Communist Party of Germany (KPD). On 9 April, near the end of a wave of strikes and violence across Germany that had started in February, the Spartacists called for a general strike in Brunswick with the goal of establishing a soviet republic. Besides ousting the SPD/USPD coalition government in Brunswick, they wanted to overthrow the SPD-led government in Berlin, unite with the Russian Soviet Republic, dissolve the Weimar National Assembly, give all power to the workers' councils, arm the workers and create a people's army. Brunswick's middle classes responded immediately with an opposition strike and boycotts.

Striking workers occupied government buildings and railroad stations and tore up tracks on a key east-west rail line. The blockage threatened to bring deliveries of coal and foodstuffs across Germany to a standstill. The federal government in Berlin responded by declaring a state of siege in Brunswick on 13 April. Representatives of the parties in the Landtag were able to convince the leaders on both sides to end their strikes, so that when General Georg Maercker entered the city of Braunschweig with 10,000 Freikorps troops on 17 April, he encountered no resistance. There were, however, a number of deaths in the smaller towns of Börssum and Helmstedt. Maercker had some of the leaders of the workers arrested, including Oerter.

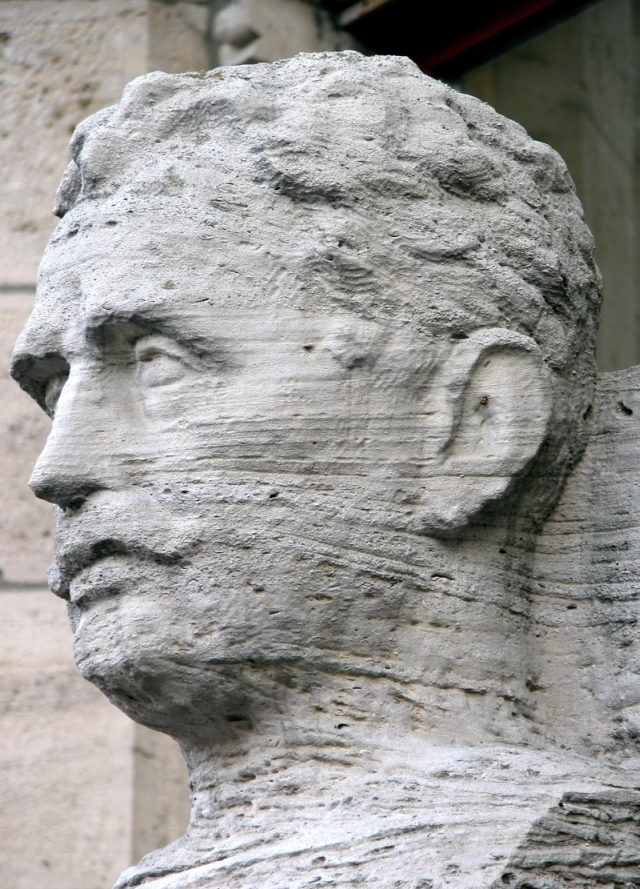
Sculpture of Heinrich Jasper, Brunswick's first minister-president. He died in the Bergen-Belsen concentration camp on 19 February 1945.

Maercker then stripped the workers' councils of their power, removed the state ministry and ordered Heinrich Jasper of the SPD to build a new government that would include all of the parties in parliament. When the SPD and USPD refused to participate, an agreement was reached that the existing ministry, without Oerter, would stay in office on a caretaker basis. Maercker's troops disarmed the workers and formed a middle-class self-defence force (Landeseinwohnerwehr) to keep order after the Freikorps troops withdrew. They left Brunswick on 30 April, although the state of emergency was not lifted until 6 June.

The Landtag elected a new government on 30 April. It was a coalition of the SPD, USPD and liberal German Democratic Party (DDP) with Jasper as minister-president. His government lasted only two months. At the end of June, a vote of no confidence introduced by the DDP against the two USPD members in the government passed when the SPD withheld its votes. The ousted ministers were replaced by two SPD members.

In the Landtag election of June 1920, which took place the same day as the national Reichstag election, the SPD dropped 13 percentage points from its 1918 showing – the same amount that the USPD picked up – and the DDP lost 12 points, nearly equal to the BLWV coalition's gain. The USPD and SPD, which held 32 of the Landtag's 60 seats, formed a coalition ministry with Sepp Oerter of the USPD as minister-president. He resigned in November 1921 following accusations of corruption, a charge on which he was later convicted. After he was expelled from the USPD in January 1924, he joined the Nazi Party (NSDAP). Since he was still a member of the Brunswick Landtag, it gave the Nazis their first representation in the body.

Before Oerter's resignation, the Landtag passed the Land Procurement Act, which distributed land to workers with the goal of converting large farms into cooperatives (Genossenschaften). Through the program, ten percent of Brunswick's agricultural land was converted by the end of 1921. The Landtag also passed a law creating works councils (Betriebsräte), a tenant protection law, a tax law that put the heaviest burden on agriculture, and a law that separated church and state assets.

=== Constitution ===
The Free State of Brunswick's republican constitution finally became effective on 6 January 1922. As under the preliminary constitution, it defined a parliament with a single chamber (the Landtag) that passed laws, supervised the administration and elected ministers who were responsible to the Landtag and could be recalled through a vote of no confidence. The ministry held executive power and could refer laws passed by the Landtag back to it for a second vote (suspensive veto). With the agreement of a standing committee elected by the Landtag from among its members, the ministry could issue emergency decrees as long as they did not violate the constitution.

== Post-revolution politics to 1930 ==
In the January 1922 Landtag election, the USPD/SPD coalition narrowly lost its majority. After the Landtag failed to approve a measure expressing confidence in the government in May, it resigned and a new ministry of the SPD, DDP and right-of-center DVP was formed under Heinrich Jasper of the SPD as minister-president. The coalition marked a significant shift of the Brunswick government to the right.

Inflation-related demonstrations had begun in Brunswick in August 1920. In September 1922, the Jasper government used an emergency decree to set up a special police office to fight price gouging and usury. More serious unrest nevertheless erupted in November, and conflicts broke out between the state administration and the trade unions over the issue. Anti-inflation demonstrations peaked in 1923 along with the Weimar Republic hyperinflation. In Schöningen, the Reichswehr was called in to quell a disturbance in October. It was during this same period that the first Nazi Party organizations were formed in Brunswick (Wolfenbüttel and the city of Braunschweig). Within less than a year, the state government banned the party on the basis of the federal Law for the Protection of the Republic.

Landtag election results by seats
Party	1918	1920	1922	1924	1927	1930	1933 (Note: Restructuring of the Landtag on the basis of the Reichstag election of 5 March 1933)
Social Democratic Party (SPD)	17	9	12	19	24	17	18
German Democratic Party (DDP)	13	5	6	2	2	1	–
Independent Social Democratic Party (USPD)	14	23	17	–	.		.
German National People's Party (DNVP)	16 (Note: Brunswick State Electoral Association (BLWV))	23	23	10	5	11 (Note: Citizens' Unity List)	4
Brunswick - Lower Saxony Party (BNP)	16	23	23	1	–	11	–
German People's Party (DVP)	16	23	23	9	8	11	–
Economic Party (WP)				4	4	11	.
Communist Party (KPD)	.	–	2	2	2	2	[5] (Note: The Nazi Party excluded the KPD members following the reconfiguration of the Landtag which took place after the 5 March 1933 Reichstag election.)
Nazi Party (NSDAP)				1 (Note: National Socialist Freedom Movement (NSFB), a front party for the Nazis during the period it was banned after the failed Beer Hall Putsch)	1	9	29
Homeowners and Landowners (HuG)				.	2		.
Totals	60	60	60	48	48	40	51 (Note: Excluding the 5 KPD members who were not seated)

Notes:

In the Landtag election of 1924, the SPD lost its majority. Gerhard Marquordt, nominally an independent but with ties to the German People's Party (DVP), became minister-president with a cabinet of two ministers who were close to the German National People's Party (DNVP). Marquordt's ministry lasted until the 1927 election, at which point Heinrich Jasper returned with an all-SPD cabinet after the party took half of the seats in the Landtag. The 1930 election took place as the Great Depression was beginning to be felt in Germany and unemployment was rising rapidly. The Nazi Party won 22% of the vote and nine seats, up from one in the 1927 election. The Landtag elected Ernst Zörner of the NSDAP its president and Werner Küchenthal of the Citizens' Unity List (DNVP, BNP, DVP and WP) as Brunswick's minister-president. His one minister, Anton Franzen, was from the NSDAP.

== Nazi takeover ==
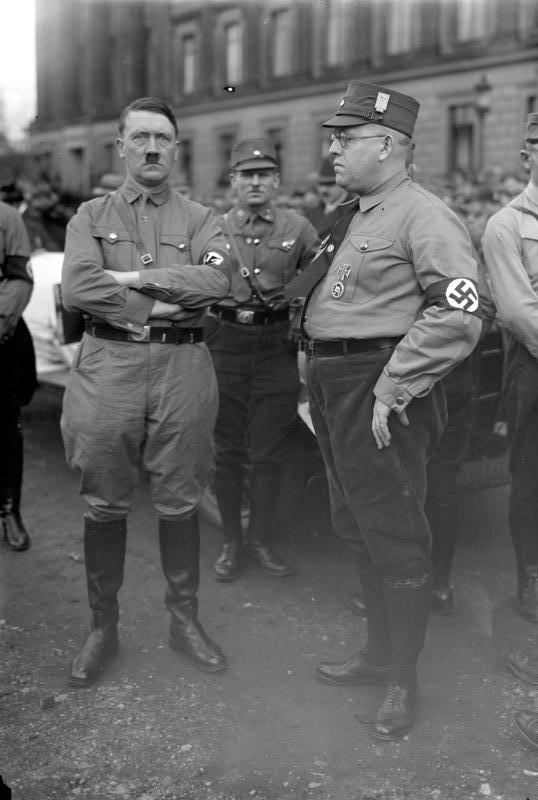
Adolf Hitler and Anton Franzen in Braunschweig

Franzen and the SPD almost immediately came into conflict with one another. He banned marches and outdoor public gatherings and confiscated SPD flyers and posters. District directors and police commanders who were SPD members were dismissed, as were a number of sympathetic school inspectors and teachers. Early in 1931 there were strikes in the public schools against Franzen's actions, and he had parents of children who supported the strike briefly jailed. After a leading SPD newspaper, the Volksfreund, called for additional strikes, it was repeatedly banned for three-week periods. A gathering of 100,000 Sturmabteilung (SA) troops in Braunschweig in October led to street battles which left two dead and 61 injured.

Dietrich Klagges, also of the NSDAP, replaced Franzen as minister of the interior and of education at the end of September 1931. Klagges appointed Hitler a government functionary (Regierungsrat) with the Brunswick delegation to the Reichsrat in Berlin on 25 February 1932. The position gave Hitler, who had been born in Austria, citizenship of Brunswick and thus automatically the German citizenship he needed to run for German president against Paul von Hindenburg. He was defeated in the election, but Hindenburg named him chancellor of Germany in January 1933.

As part of the Nazi's Gleichschaltung (coordination) process, the Provisional Law on the Coordination of the States with the Reich was enacted on 30 March 1933. It dissolved all of Germany's state parliaments and reconstituted them on the basis of the votes in the 5 March 1933 Reichstag election, with the KPD explicitly excluded from the counts. Brunswick had given the Nazis 49.05% of their vote, with 30.45% to the SPD and 8.77% to the KPD. That was translated to 29 Nazi seats in the Brunswick Landtag, a clear majority of the 51 seats after the five SPD delegates were excluded. Klagges was elected minister-president and took office on 9 May 1933 with a two-member NSDAP cabinet. The real power, however, lay with the Reichsstatthalter (Reich governor) of Anhalt and Brunswick, Wilhelm Friedrich Loeper, who had been named four days previously. On 30 January 1934, the Law on the Reconstruction of the Reich formally abolished all state parliaments and transferred the sovereignty of the states to the central government.

== World War II and end of the Free State ==
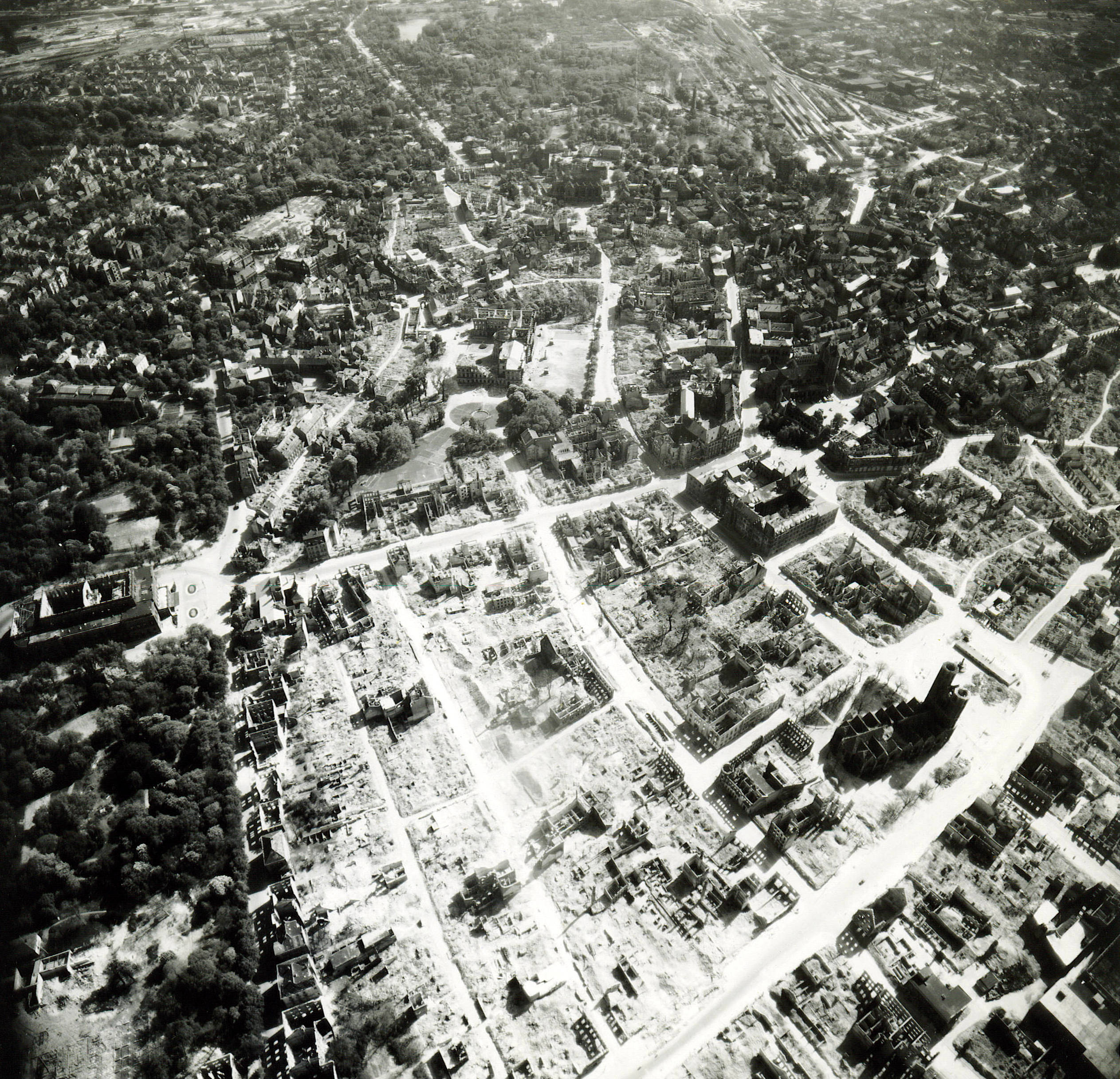
Aerial photograph of bomb-damaged central Braunschweig taken on 12 May 1945

Braunschweig was bombed numerous times during World War II. The most serious attack took place on 15 October 1944, when the bombs ignited a firestorm that lasted for two and a half days and destroyed over 90% of the city's medieval center. During the full course of the war, 35% of Braunschweig's housing was completely destroyed, with only 20% undamaged. By the war's end, 80% of the city's inhabitants were homeless. Half of Brunswick's industry had been levelled along with 60% of its cultural assets. Reports from the time counted 2,900 deaths, of which almost 1,300 were foreigners (prisoners of war and forced laborers).

On 12 April 1945, Army forces took the city of Braunschweig and deposed the Nazi government. The Brunswick territory became part of the British occupation zone, with the exception of the eastern Blankenburg and Calvörde areas, which went to Soviet-administered Saxony-Anhalt. On 7 May 1946, the British authorities appointed Social Democrat Alfred Kubel minister-president. The Brunswick territory that was within the British zone merged with the State of Hanover (a former Prussian province), the Free States of Oldenburg and of Schaumburg-Lippe to create the newly founded state of Lower Saxony, effective on 1 November 1946.

== Leaders ==
=== Chairmen of the Council of People's Deputies, 1918–1919 ===
1. 1918–1919: Sepp Oerter (USPD)
2. 1919–1920: Heinrich Jasper (SPD)

=== Minister-Presidents, 1919–1946 ===
1. 1919–1920: Heinrich Jasper (SPD)
2. 1920–1921: Sepp Oerter (USPD)
3. 1921–1922: August Junke (SPD)
4. 1922: Otto Antrick (SPD)
5. 1922: Heinrich Jasper (SPD)
6. 1924–1927: Gerhard Marquordt (DVP)
7. 1927–1930: Heinrich Jasper (SPD)
8. 1930–1933: Werner Küchenthal (DNVP)
9. 1933–1945: Dietrich Klagges (NSDAP)
10. 1945–1946: Hubert Schlebusch (SPD)
11. 1946: Alfred Kubel (SPD)

=== Reichsstatthalter ===
Reichsstatthalter for Anhalt and Brunswick (headquarters in Dessau)

1. 1933–1935: Wilhelm Loeper
2. 1935–1937: Fritz Sauckel
3. 1937–1945: Rudolf Jordan

== Administration ==
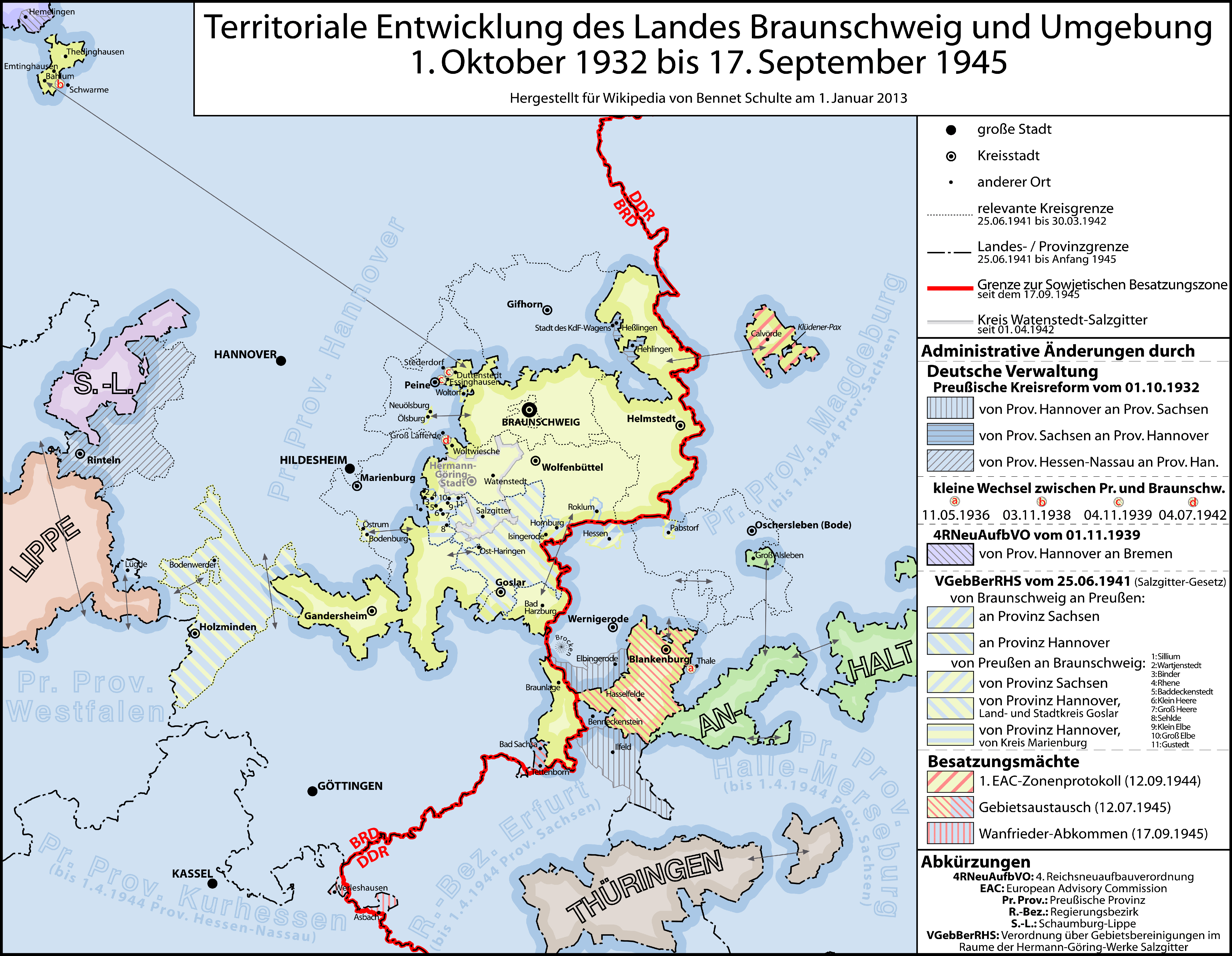
Territorial evolution of Brunswick, 1932–1945. The dark red line is the border between West Germany and East Germany.

The Free State of Brunswick initially comprised the City of Braunschweig and the following rural districts:

- Blankenburg (divided in 1945 between British and Soviet zone of occupation)
- Braunschweig
- Gandersheim
- Holzminden (to the Prussian province of Hanover on 1 November 1941 in return for the District of Goslar and the City of Goslar)
- Helmstedt
- Wolfenbüttel

On 1 April 1942, the city district of Watenstedt-Salzgitter was established on Goslar and Wolfenbüttel territory.

== See also ==
- Brunswick Land
- Brunswick Landtag elections in the Weimar Republic

== Bibliography ==
- Reinhard Bein: Braunschweig zwischen rechts und links. Der Freistaat 1918 bis 1930. Döring, Braunschweig 1990, ISBN 3-925268-05-7.
- Reinhard Bein: Im deutschen Land marschieren wir. Freistaat Braunschweig 1930–1945. 6th edition. Döring, Braunschweig 1992, ISBN 3-925268-02-2.
- Horst-Rüdiger Jarck, Gerhard Schildt (eds.): Die Braunschweigische Landesgeschichte. Jahrtausendrückblick einer Region. 2nd edition. Appelhans Verlag, Braunschweig 2001, ISBN 3-930292-28-9.
- Helmut Kramer (ed.): Braunschweig unterm Hakenkreuz. Magni Buchladen, Braunschweig 1981, ISBN 3-922571-03-4.
- Jörg Leuschner, Karl Heinrich Kaufhold, Claudia Märtl (eds.): Die Wirtschafts- und Sozialgeschichte des Braunschweigischen Landes vom Mittelalter bis zur Gegenwart. 3 vols. Georg Olms Verlag, Hildesheim 2008, ISBN 978-3-487-13599-1.
- Richard Moderhack (ed.): Braunschweigische Landesgeschichte im Überblick. 3rd edition, Braunschweigischer Geschichtsverein, Braunschweig 1979.
- Werner Pöls, Klaus Erich Pollmann (eds.): Moderne Braunschweigische Geschichte. Georg Olms Verlag, Hildesheim 1982, ISBN 3-487-07316-1.
- Hans Reinowski: Terror in Braunschweig – Aus dem 1. Quartal der Hitlerherrschaft. Zurich 1933.
- Ernst-August Roloff: Braunschweig und der Staat von Weimar. Waisenhaus-Buchdruckerei und Verlag, Braunschweig 1964.
- Ernst-August Roloff: Bürgertum und Nationalsozialismus 1930–1933. Braunschweigs Weg ins Dritte Reich. Hanover 1961.
- Ehm Welk: Im Morgennebel. 2nd edition, Verlag Volk und Welt, East Berlin 1954 (novel).
