= Werner Küchenthal =

Werner Küchenthal (13 January 1882 - 20 June 1976) was a German jurist and public official who became a leading politician (DNVP, NSDAP) in what was then the Free State of Brunswick ("Freistaat Braunschweig").

== Life ==
Werner Küchenthal was born in Münchehof, a small manufacturing country town focused on limestone extraction and cement production, positioned in the countryside between Braunschweig to its north and Göttingen to its south. After leaving school he studied jurisprudence, passing his Level 1 national law exams in 1903. As a student he became a member of what became the "Alte Turnerschaft Eberhardina-Markomannia Tübingen" student fraternity. He received his doctorate at the University of Leipzig in 1907 His dissertation concerned property and possession rights in respect of game killed by poachers and the duties and rights of lawful huntsmen and gamekeepers against poachers ("Über den Eigentumserwerb am Wilderergute und die Ansprüche und rechtlichen Befugnisse des Jagdberechtigten gegen den Wilderer").

Küchenthal entered the public service a court assessor, and shortly afterwards joined the public prosecution service. Later he became a judge in the regional court and a permanent member of the Berlin-based Imperial Oversight Office for Private Insurance. He volunteered to fight in the First World War and was also active in the Ministry of War. After his promotion to the higher ranks of the public service (als "Oberregierungsrat") in 1920 he worked in the tax department of the Regional Finance Office in Hanover.

He joined the German National People's Party ("Deutschnationale Volkspartei" / DNVP) in 1919, remaining a member till 1933. From 22 January 1926 till 13 December 1927 he served in the regional government under Gerhard Marquordt as Minister for Finance and the Economy. His term in office was characterised by attempts to cut back on public spending. Between 1928 and 1930 he took over as head of the Regional Finance Office, based in Hanover.

Following the election results of September 1930 the moderate left-wing coalition in the regional parliament was replaced by a broadly constituted coalition headed up by the DNVP and NSDAP. On 1 October 1930 these two, with the other smaller parties to the new governing coalition, voted Werner Küchenthal in as chair of the Council of Ministers / Minister-president of Braunschweig, the duties to be combined with departmental responsibilities for Finance and Justice. The Interior and Education ministry went to the NSDAP member, Anton Franzen who was succeeded by fellow-Nazi Dietrich Klagges on 15 September 1931. Klagges expanded his portfolio, replacing Küchenthal as Braunschweig's Minister-President, on 9 May 1933.

Adolf Hitler surrendered his Austrian citizenship in 1925 and submitted an application for German citizenship. Under the Weimar constitution (Art. 41 para. 2) he would never be able to become President without it. A (bizarrely, anonymous) application was quietly submitted on Hitler's behalf in Thuringia. The application was not successful. Over the next seven years applications for German citizenship were submitted by or on behalf of Hitler in various other parts of Germany, but it became increasingly clear that they were all being blocked by Berlin, mindful of Hitler's attempt to overthrow the government back in 1923. Along the way, it was discovered by eagle eyed readers of the constitution that if Hitler could be found a job in government service, German citizenship might be conferred automatically. Various attempts to find the Nazi leader a low profile appointment floundered, partly because of resistance in the political establishment and partly because Hitler had more important preoccupations than accepting a low profile appointment in government service. In 1932 the focus of those attempting to obtain citizenship for the party leader switched to the Free State of Brunswick/Braunschweig. Braunschweig was small and for most purposes outside the usual ambit of political commentators. More importantly, it was a state where the Nazi Party already held power, albeit in coalition with other parties. The political leadership, including Minister-President Werner Küchenthal of the DNVP, were supportive. Küchenthal suggested that Hitler might be appointed mayor of the little town of Stadtoldendorf. That was rejected by other parties in the coalition, however. In the end it is not clear whether it was the support of the regional government under Küchenthal that secured Hitler's appointment to a government post in Braunschweig, and how far it was the implicit threat of the Nazi Party to pull out of the governing coalition which would have triggered new regional elections (which all parties had good reason to fear at that point). On 26 February 1932 Adolf Hitler was duly appointed to the appropriately obscure post of "Regierungsrat der braunschweigschen Gesandtschaft beim Reichsrat" (loosely "Government official of the Braunschweig delegation to the National Council"). Citizenship for Adolf Hitler followed, backed by the practical support of the Free State of Brunswick/Braunschweig led by Werner Küchenthal. It was, in its way, an important contribution.

On 1 May 1933 Werner Küchenthal joined the Nazi Party less than two months after the Enabling Act of 1933 which enshrined in statute the transformation of Germany into a one-party state. After Oskar Stübben had been persuaded to resign the position, Küchenthal took over as president of the board at the Braunschweig State Bank. (Stübben was not Jewish and he was certainly not a communist, but he was not a Nazi either.) Küchenthal remained in charge at the bank until relieved of his duties there on 13 August 1945 in the aftermath of another national military defeat.

He spent the rest of his life as a farmer in Hedeper.
