= Georg Ludwig Rudolf Maercker =

German general

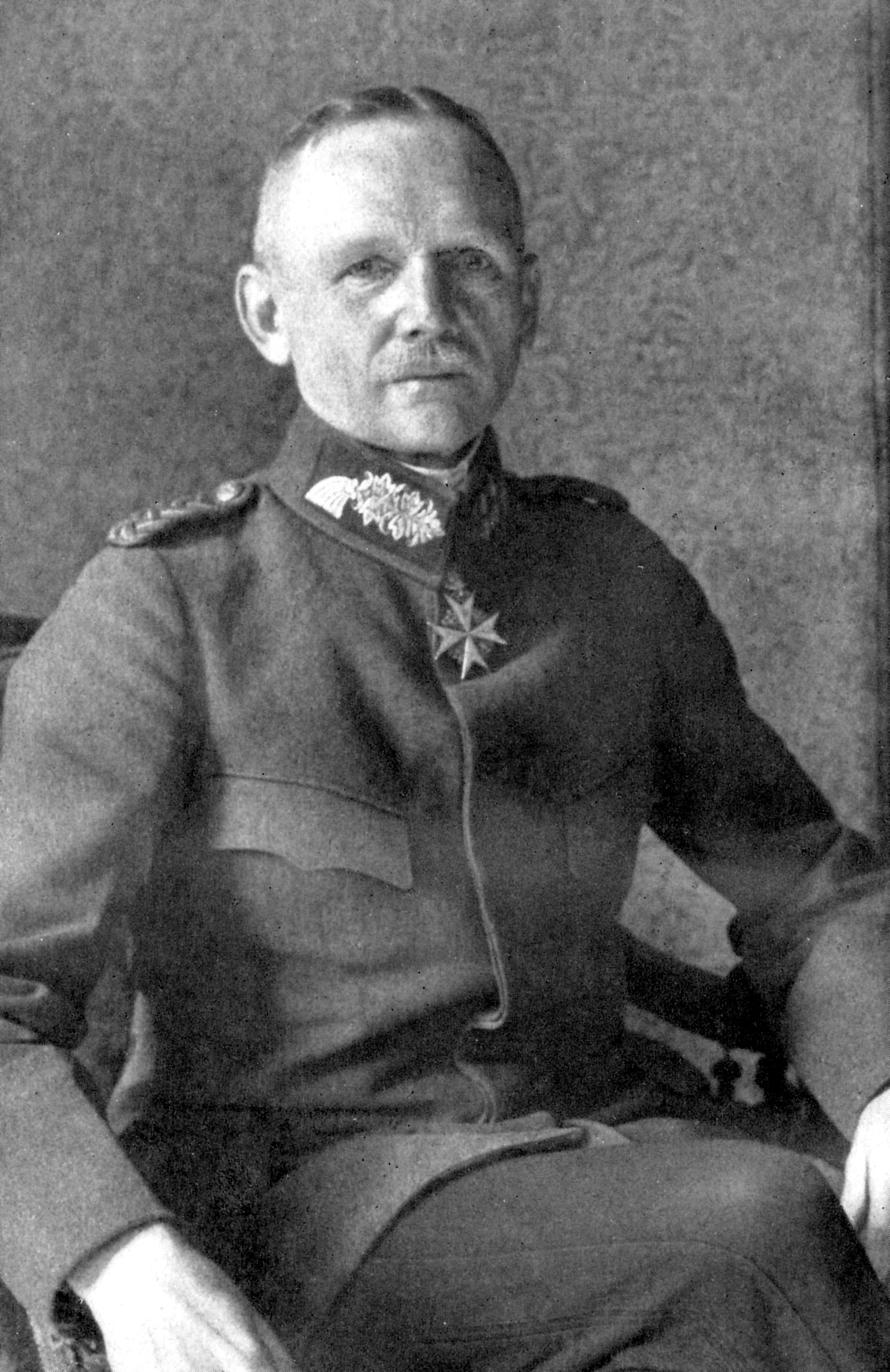
- Born: 21 September 1865; Baldenburg, Kingdom of Prussia
- Died: 31 December 1924 (aged 59); Dresden, Weimar Republic
- Burial place: Nordfriedhof, Dresden; 51°04′49″N 13°46′38″E
- Spouse: Luise Lindner
- Military career
- Allegiance: German Empire; Weimar Republic
- Branch: Imperial German Army; Schutztruppe; Reichswehr
- Service years: 1885–1920
- Rank: Generalmajor
- Commands: 214th Division; Landjägerkorps
- Conflicts: Herero Wars; World War I
- Awards: Pour le Mérite

Georg Ludwig Rudolf Maercker (21 September 1865 – 31 December 1924) was a German general who served during World War I.

Following the Armistice of 1918 that saw the end of fighting and of the Bolshevik revolution that led to the creation of the Soviet Union, there were many examples of disturbances throughout Germany. Maercker suggested the formation of Freikorps (Free Corps) to suppress these and a number of formations formed themselves, usually around individual army officers. After leaving the Freikorps, Maercker became active in Der Stahlhelm group and was the president of the Saxony chapter. In 1924, Maercker together with Theodor Duesterberg was a leader of the antisemitic fraction within the Stahhelm who wanted an "Aryan clause" that would ban Jews from joining the Stahlhelm and expel the current Jewish members. In March 1924, Maercker and Duesterberg got their way and forced Franz Seldte to adopt the "Aryan clause" and expel all Jews from the Stahlhelm.
