= Visa requirements for Austrian citizens =

Administrative entry restrictions

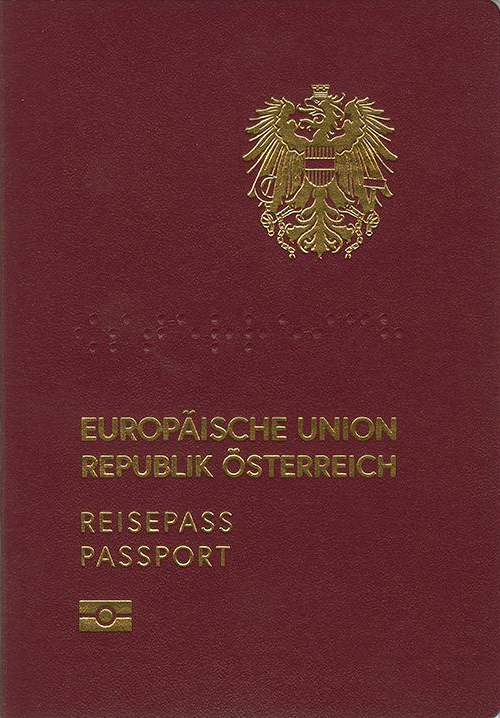
Austrian passport

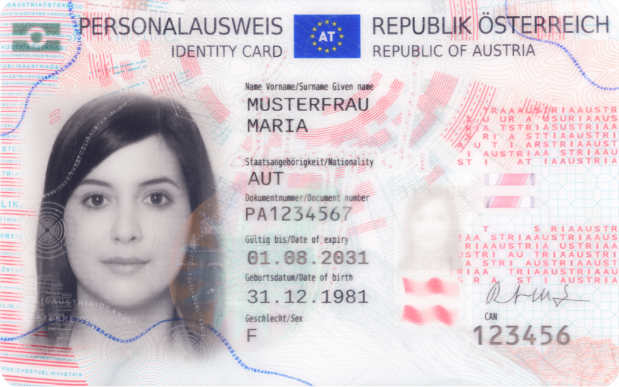
An Austrian identity card is valid for travel to most of the European countries

Visa requirements for Austrian citizens are administrative entry restrictions imposed by the authorities of foreign states on citizens of Austria. As of 2026, Austrian citizens have visa-free, eTA visa on arrival access to 184 countries and territories, ranking the Austrian passport 5th in the world, according to the methodology of the Henley Passport Index.

== Visa requirements map ==
Visa requirements for Austrian citizens holding ordinary passports Austria Freedom of movement Visa not required / ETA (Note: ETA required for Canada if arriving by air, Kenya, Israel, New Zealand, Saint Kitts and Nevis, Seychelles, United Kingdom and the United States and its territories) (Note: Including Australian eVisitor.) Visa on arrival eVisa Visa available both on arrival or online (Note: Including Indonesian e-VOA) Visa required prior to arrival

== Visa requirements ==
Country	Visa requirement	Allowed stay	Notes (excluding departure fees)
Afghanistan	eVisa	30 days	A visa is not required for individuals born in Afghanistan or for those who can provide proof that one of their parents is an Afghan national or was born in Afghanistan.; e-Visa : Visitors must arrive at Kabul International (KBL).
Albania	Visa not required	90 days	ID card valid.
Algeria	Visa required		Persons may be denied entry if entering with a passport containing visas or stamps issued by Israel.; Visitors on tours organized to some southern regions by an approved travel agency may obtain a visa on arrival for up to 30 days.
Andorra	Visa not required		ID card valid.
Angola	Visa not required	30 days	30 days per trip, but no more than 90 days within any 1 calendar year for tourism purposes only.; Visitors must have a return/onward ticket and a hotel reservation confirmation.; An International Certificate of Vaccination is required.
Antigua and Barbuda	Visa not required	6 months	
Argentina	Visa not required	90 days	
Armenia	Visa not required	180 days	
Australia	eVisitor	90 days	90 days on each visit in 12-month period if granted.
Azerbaijan	eVisa	30 days	
Bahamas	Visa not required	3 months	
Bahrain	eVisa / Visa on arrival	14 days	
Bangladesh	Visa on arrival	30 days	
Barbados	Visa not required	3 months	
Belarus	Visa not required	30 days	Visa free until 31.12.2026
Belgium	Visa not required	Freedom of movement.; ID card valid.	
Belize	Visa not required		
Benin	eVisa	30 days	Must have an international vaccination certificate.; Three types of electronic visa are offered: the e-Visa valid for 30 days for a single entry (50 EUR), the e-Visa valid for 30 days for several (multiple) entries (75 EUR), and the e-Visa valid for 90 days to make several (multiple) entries (100 EUR).
Bhutan	eVisa		The Sustainable Development Fee (SDF) of 200 USD per person, per night for almost all visitors to Bhutan. Additionally, if payment is made in US dollars from September 1, 2023 to August 31, 2027, the SDF is 100 USD.
Bolivia	Visa not required	90 days	
Bosnia and Herzegovina	Visa not required	90 days	90 days within any 6-month period.; ID card valid.
Botswana	Visa not required	90 days	
Brazil	Visa not required	90 days	90 days within any 180 day period.
Brunei	Visa not required	90 days	
Bulgaria	Visa not required	Freedom of movement.; ID card valid.	
Burkina Faso	eVisa	1 month	
Burundi	eVisa / Visa on arrival	1 month	
Cambodia	eVisa / Visa on arrival	30 days	Visa is also obtainable online.
Cameroon	eVisa		
Canada	eTA / Visa not required	6 months	eTA required if arriving by air.
Cape Verde	Visa not required	30 days	Must register online at least five days prior to arrival.; Visitors must pay the Airport Security Fee (TSA) before visiting. The cost is 3,400 CVE (approx. 31 EUR) and can be paid via the online platform (EASE).
Central African Republic	Visa required		
Chad	eVisa	90 days	
Chile	Visa not required	90 days	
China	Visa not required	30 days	Visa-free from 14 March, 2024 to 31 December, 2026.
Colombia	Visa not required	90 days	90 days - extendable up to 180-days stay within a 1-year period.
Comoros	Visa on arrival	45 days	
Republic of the Congo	Visa required		
Democratic Republic of the Congo	eVisa	7 days	
Costa Rica	Visa not required	90 days	
Côte d'Ivoire	eVisa		
Croatia	Visa not required	Freedom of movement.; ID card valid.	
Cuba	eVisa	90 days	Can be extended up to 90 days with a fee.
Cyprus	Visa not required	Freedom of movement.; ID card valid.	
Czech Republic	Visa not required	Freedom of movement.; ID card valid.	
Denmark	Visa not required	Freedom of movement.; ID card valid.	
Djibouti	eVisa / Visa on arrival	30 days	
Dominica	Visa not required	90 days	90 days within any 180 day period.
Dominican Republic	Visa not required	90 days	
Ecuador	Visa not required	90 days	
Egypt	eVisa / Visa on arrival	30 days	
El Salvador	Visa not required	3 months	
Equatorial Guinea	eVisa		
Eritrea	Visa required		
Estonia	Visa not required	Freedom of movement.; ID card valid.	
Eswatini	Visa not required	30 days	
Ethiopia	eVisa / Visa on arrival	up to 90 days	Visa on arrival is obtainable only at Addis Ababa Bole International Airport.; e-Visa holders must arrive via Addis Ababa Bole International Airport.; e-Visa is available for 30 or 90 days.
Fiji	Visa not required	4 months	
Finland	Visa not required	Freedom of movement.; ID card valid.	
France	Visa not required	Freedom of movement (in Regions of France).; ID card valid.	
Gabon	eVisa	90 days	e-Visa holders must arrive via Libreville International Airport.
Gambia	Visa not required	90 days	
Georgia	Visa not required	1 year	ID card valid.
Germany	Visa not required	Freedom of movement.; ID card valid.	
Ghana	Visa required		
Greece	Visa not required	Freedom of movement.; ID card valid.	
Grenada	Visa not required	3 months	
Guatemala	Visa not required	90 days	
Guinea	eVisa	90 days	
Guinea-Bissau	Visa on arrival	90 days	
Guyana	Visa not required	90 days	
Haiti	Visa not required	90 days	
Honduras	Visa not required	3 months	
Hungary	Visa not required	Freedom of movement.; ID card valid.	
Iceland	Visa not required	Freedom of movement.; ID card valid.	
India	eVisa	30 days	e-Visa holders must arrive via 32 designated airports (Note: Ahmedabad; Amritsar; Bagdogra; Bengaluru; Bhubaneswar; Chandigarh; Chennai; Coimbatore; Delhi; Gaya; Goa-Dabolim; Goa-Manohar; Guwahati; Hyderabad; Indore; Jaipur; Kannur; Kochi; Kolkata; Kozhikode; Lucknow; Madurai; Mangaluru; Mumbai; Nagpur; Port Blair; Pune; Surat; Thiruvananthapuram; Tiruchirappalli; Varanasi; Visakhapatnam) or 5 designated seaports. (Note: Chennai; Cochin; Mormugao (Goa); Mumbai; Mangalore); An Indian e-Tourist Visa may only be obtained twice within 1 calendar year.; Foreigners of Pakistani origin or who hold a Pakistani Passport are not eligible for an e-Visa. Foreigners who are not Pakistani nationals, but whose parents or grandparents (either paternal or maternal) were born in, or were permanent residents in Pakistan, are also not eligible for an e-Visa.
Indonesia	e-VOA / Visa on arrival	30 days	
Iran	eVisa	30 days	Passengers who have already made an application, at least two days before arrival, at the Iranian Ministry of Foreign Affair's e-Visa website and present the submission notification at the airport's visa desk may obtain a visa on arrival.
Iraq	eVisa	60 days	Visa on arrival or e-Visa for up to 30 days for travel to Iraqi Kurdistan.
Ireland	Visa not required	Freedom of movement.; ID card valid.	
Israel	ETA-IL	90 days	
Italy	Visa not required	Freedom of movement.; ID card valid.	
Jamaica	Visa not required	30 days	
Japan	Visa not required	90 days	Extendable once.
Jordan	eVisa / Visa on arrival	30 days	Visa can be obtained upon arrival, it will cost a total of 40 JOD, obtainable at most international ports of entry and land border crossings (except King Hussein/Allenby Bridge)
Kazakhstan	Visa not required	30 days	
Kenya	Electronic Travel Authorization	3 months	Applications can be submitted up to 90 days prior to travel and must be submitted at least 3 days in advance.; eTA fee is 32.50 USD.; Proof of reservation at the hotel where visitors plan to stay is required (if staying with friends, an invitation letter is also acceptable).; Yellow fever vaccination certificate is required if coming from endemic countries.
Kiribati	Visa not required	90 days	90 days within any 180 day period.
North Korea	Visa required		
South Korea	Visa not required	90 days	K-ETA exemption until the end of 2026.
Kuwait	eVisa / Visa on arrival	3 months	
Kyrgyzstan	Visa not required	60 days	60 days within 120 days
Laos	eVisa / Visa on arrival	30 days	18 (Note: Savannakhet Airport; Lanetoui - Mengkang (China); Meuangmom - Wan Pong (Myanmar); Banvang - Ban Khok Phai (Thailand); Namngeun - Huay Kon (Thailand); Paksan - Bueng Kan (Thailand); Paktaphan - Pak Saeng (Thailand); Pangmon - Ban Huak (Thailand); Phoudou (Thailand); Dak ta ock - Nam Giang (Vietnam); La Lai (Vietnam); Namkan (Vietnam); Namphao - Cau Treo (Vietnam); Namsoy - Na Meo (Vietnam); Naphao - Cha Lo (Vietnam); Pahang - Long Sap (Vietnam); Panghok - Tây Trang (Vietnam); Phoukeua - Bo Y (Vietnam)) of the 33 border crossings are only open to regular visa holders.; e-Visa may be used to enter Laos through the Luang Prabang, Pakse and Vientiane international airports, 3 Thai-Lao Friendship Bridges (Note: Vientiane (Friendship Bridge 1); Savannakhet (Friendship Bridge 2); Bokeo (Friendship Bridge 4)), in Boten (road and railroad), and in Vientiane (at Khamsavath railway station).; Visa on arrival is available at the Luang Prabang, Pakse and Vientiane international airports, 4 Thai-Lao Friendship Bridges (Note: Vientiane (Friendship Bridge 1); Savannakhet (Friendship Bridge 2); Khammouane (Friendship Bridge 3); Bokeo (Friendship Bridge 4)) and 7 border crossings. (Note: Nongnokkheane - Trapeang Kriel (Cambodia); Boten - Bo han (China); Golden Triangle/Samliemkham (Thailand); Khamsavath railway station (Thailand); Namheuang - Ban Na Kraseng (Thailand); Vang tao - Chongmek (Thailand); Dansavan - Lao Bảo (Vietnam))
Latvia	Visa not required	Freedom of movement.; ID card valid.	
Lebanon	Free visa on arrival	1 month	1 month extendable for 2 additional months.; Granted free of charge at Beirut International Airport or any other port of entry if there is no Israeli visa or seal, holding a telephone number, an address in Lebanon, and a non refundable return or circle trip ticket.
Lesotho	Visa not required	14 days	
Liberia	eVisa	90 days	The Liberia Visa on Arrival (VoA) allows travelers to obtain a Visa upon arrival in Liberia by plane. Travelers must pre-apply for the visa online.
Libya	eVisa	30 days	Independent travel is not permitted, and visitors must organize their visit through a tour guide. A tourist police escort is required at all times.; An eVisa will not be granted without a sponsor or tour agency.; A security letter issued by the Libyan Immigration Authorities may also be required.; Holders of passports containing an Israeli stamp or visa will be refused entry in Libya.
Liechtenstein	Visa not required	Freedom of movement.; ID card valid.	
Lithuania	Visa not required	Freedom of movement.; ID card valid.	
Luxembourg	Visa not required	Freedom of movement.; ID card valid.	
Madagascar	eVisa / Visa on arrival	60 days	
Malawi	eVisa / Visa on arrival	90 days	
Malaysia	Visa not required	3 months	The electronic Malaysia Digital Arrival Card must be submitted within three days before the date of arrival in Malaysia.
Maldives	Free visa on arrival	30 days	
Mali	Visa required		
Malta	Visa not required	Freedom of movement.; ID card valid.	
Marshall Islands	Visa not required	90 days	90 days within any 180 day period.
Mauritania	eVisa	30 days	An e-Visa is mandatory before travel.
Mauritius	Visa not required	180 days	180 days for tourism, 120 days for business
Mexico	Visa not required	180 days	
Micronesia	Visa not required	90 days	90 days within any 180 day period.
Moldova	Visa not required	90 days	90 days within any 180 day period.; ID card valid.
Monaco	Visa not required		ID card valid.
Mongolia	Visa not required	30 days	The Ministry of Foreign Affairs of Mongolia has exempted visas for 34 countries from January 2023 to December 2026.
Montenegro	Visa not required	90 days	ID card valid for 30 days.
Morocco	Visa not required	90 days	
Mozambique	eVisa / Visa on arrival	30 days	
Myanmar	eVisa	28 days	e-Visa holders must arrive via Yangon, Nay Pyi Taw or Mandalay airports or via land border crossings with Thailand — Tachileik, Myawaddy and Kawthaung or India — Rih Khaw Dar and Tamu.; e-Visa available for both tourism or business purposes.
Namibia	eVisa / Visa on arrival	3 months	Can be obtained online or on arrival for a fee of N$1,600 (approximately €82 / US$88).
Nauru	Visa required		
Nepal	Online Visa / Visa on arrival	90 days	
Netherlands	Visa not required	Freedom of movement (European Netherlands).; ID card valid.	
New Zealand	Electronic Travel Authority	3 months	International Visitor Conservation and Tourism Levy must be paid upon requesting an Electronic Travel Authority.; Holders of an Australian Permanent Resident Visa or Resident Return Visa may be granted a New Zealand Resident Visa on arrival permitting indefinite stay (pursuant to the Trans-Tasman Travel Arrangement), subject to meeting character requirements and obtaining an Electronic Travel Authority prior to departure. Such travellers are not required to pay the International Visitor Conservation and Tourism Levy.
Nicaragua	Visa not required	90 days	
Niger	Visa required		
Nigeria	eVisa	90 days	
North Macedonia	Visa not required	90 days	ID card valid.
Norway	Visa not required	Freedom of movement; ID card valid.	
Oman	Visa not required / eVisa	14 days / 30 days	
Pakistan	eVisa	90 days	Online Visa eligible.; Issued in 7-10 business days.
Palau	Visa not required	90 days	90 days within any 180 day period.
Panama	Visa not required	90 days	
Papua New Guinea	eVisa	60 days	Available at Gurney Airport (Alotau), Mount Hagen Airport, Port Moresby Airport and Tokua Airport (Rabaul).
Paraguay	Visa not required	90 days	
Peru	Visa not required	90 days	90 days within any 6-month period
Philippines	Visa not required	30 days	A single or multiple entry eVisa for stays of up to 59 days is also available.
Poland	Visa not required	Freedom of movement.; ID card valid.	
Portugal	Visa not required	Freedom of movement.; ID card valid.	
Qatar	Visa not required	90 days	
Romania	Visa not required	Freedom of movement.; ID card valid.	
Russia	eVisa	30 days	
Rwanda	eVisa / Visa on arrival	30 days	
Saint Kitts and Nevis	Electronic Travel Authorisation	3 months	
Saint Lucia	Visa not required	90 days	90 days within any 180 day period.
Saint Vincent and the Grenadines	Visa not required	90 days	90 days within any 180 day period.
Samoa	Visa not required	90 days	90 days within any 180 day period.
San Marino	Visa not required		ID card valid
São Tomé and Príncipe	Visa not required	15 days	
Saudi Arabia	eVisa / Visa on arrival	90 days	
Senegal	Visa not required	90 days	
Serbia	Visa not required	90 days	90 days within any 6-month period.; ID card valid.
Seychelles	ETA	3 months	
Sierra Leone	eVisa / Visa on arrival	3 months / 30 days	Obtainable online. Processing may take up to 7 days.; The mandatory yellow fever vaccination may be checked upon arrival.
Singapore	Visa not required	90 days	
Slovakia	Visa not required	Freedom of movement.; ID card valid.	
Slovenia	Visa not required	Freedom of movement.; ID card valid.	
Solomon Islands	Visa not required	90 days	90 days within any 180 day period.
Somalia	eVisa	30 days	All visitors must have an approved Electronic Visa (eTAS) before the start of their journey.
South Africa	Visa not required	90 days	
South Sudan	eVisa		Obtainable online 30 days single entry for 100 USD, 90 days multiple entry for 200 USD and 180 days multiple entry for 350 USD.; Printed visa authorization must be presented at the time of travel.
Spain	Visa not required	Freedom of movement.; ID card valid.	
Sri Lanka	ETA / Visa on arrival	30 days	Sri Lanka introduced an ETA valid for 30 days.
Sudan	Visa required		
Suriname	Visa not required	90 days	An entrance fee of USD 50 or EUR 50 must be paid online prior to arrival.; Multiple entry e-Visa is also available.
Sweden	Visa not required	Freedom of movement.; ID card valid.	
Switzerland	Visa not required	Freedom of movement.; ID card valid.	
Syria	eVisa / Visa on arrival	30 days	
Tajikistan	Visa not required	30 days	
Tanzania	eVisa / Visa on arrival	90 days	
Thailand	Visa not required	60 days	
Timor-Leste	Visa not required	90 days	90 days within any 180 day period.
Togo	eVisa	15 days	
Tonga	Visa not required	90 days	90 days within any 180 day period.
Trinidad and Tobago	Visa not required	90 days	90 days within any 180 day period.
Tunisia	Visa not required	3 months	
Turkey	Visa not required	90 days	90 days within any 180 day period.
Turkmenistan	Visa required		10-day visa on arrival if holding a letter of invitation provided by a company registered in Turkmenistan with a prior approval from the Foreign Ministry. Visitors can apply to extend their stay for an additional 10 days.; When transiting between two non-bordering countries, visitors can obtain a Turkmenistan transit visa for a five-day stay. This must be applied for in advance at the Turkmenistan Embassy. Visitors must also submit copies of the visas for the country of entry into Turkmenistan and the country of departure from Turkmenistan. Visa fee is 20 USD.
Tuvalu	Visa not required	90 days	90 days within any 180 day period.
Uganda	eVisa	3 months	
Ukraine	Visa not required	90 days	90 days within any 180 day period.
United Arab Emirates	Visa not required	90 days	90 days within any 180 day period.
United Kingdom	Electronic Travel Authorisation	6 months	ETA required.
United States	Visa Waiver Program	90 days	ESTA is valid for 2 years from the date of issuance.; ESTA is also required when entering the country by cruise ship or land.; A Form I-94 is required for entry into the United States by land. It carries a $30 fee and can be obtained either online or upon arrival.; Visa required for nationals of VWP countries who have travelled or been present in Iran, Iraq, Libya, North Korea, Somalia, Sudan, Syria or Yemen at any time on or after 1 March 2011 or Cuba at any time on or after 12 January 2021, or nationals of VWP countries who are also nationals of Iran, Iraq, North Korea, Sudan or Syria. Exceptions apply if the travel was in military or diplomatic service of the VWP country.
Uruguay	Visa not required	90 days	
Uzbekistan	Visa not required	30 days	
Vanuatu	Visa not required	90 days	90 days within any 180 day period.
Vatican City	Visa not required		ID card valid.
Venezuela	Visa not required	90 days	
Vietnam	eVisa	90 days	30 days visa free when visit Phu Quoc Island
Yemen	Visa required		Yemen introduced an e-Visa system for visitors who meet certain eligibility requirements (group travel of 10 or more people, business trips, and transit etc.).
Zambia	Visa not required	90 days	Also eligible for a universal visa.
Zimbabwe	eVisa / Visa on arrival	30 days	Also eligible for a universal visa.

== Territories and disputed areas ==
Visa requirements for Austrian citizens for visits to various territories, disputed areas, partially recognized countries and restricted zones:

Visitor to	Visa requirement	Allowed stay	Notes (excluding departure fees)
Europe
Abkhazia	Visa required		
Mount Athos	Special permit required	4 days	Special permit required (EUR 25 for Orthodox visitors, EUR 35 for non-Orthodox visitors, EUR 18 for students). There is a visitors' quota: maximum 100 Orthodox and 10 non-Orthodox per day and women are not allowed.
(Belarus) Brest and Grodno	Visa not required	Visa-free for 10 days	
(Autonomous Republic of Crimea) Crimea	eVisa	16 days	Visa issued by Russia is required.
Northern Cyprus	Visa not required	3 months	ID card valid.
(United Nations) UN Buffer Zone in Cyprus	Access Permit required		Access Permit is required for travelling inside the zone, except Civil Use Areas.
Faroe Islands	Visa not required	90 days	ID card valid.
Gibraltar	Visa not required	6 months	ID card valid.
Guernsey	Visa not required	6 months	
Jersey	Visa not required	6 months	
Isle of Man	Visa not required	6 months	
(Norway) Jan Mayen	Permit required		Permit issued by the local police required for staying for less than 24 hours and permit issued by the Norwegian police for staying for more than 24 hours.
Kosovo	Visa not required	90 days	ID card valid.
Russia	Special authorization required		Several closed cities and regions in Russia require special authorization.
South Ossetia	Russian multiple entry visa required		Multiple entry visa to Russia and three-day prior notification are required to enter South Ossetia.
Transnistria	Visa not required	24 hours	Registration required after 24h.
Africa
British Indian Ocean Territory	Special permit required		Special permit required.
Eritrea outside Asmara	Travel permit required		To travel in the rest of the country, a Travel Permit for Foreigners is required (20 Eritrean nakfa).
Canary Islands	Visa not required	Freedom of movement.; ID card valid.	
Ceuta	Visa not required	Freedom of movement.; ID card valid.	
Melilla	Visa not required	Freedom of movement.; ID card valid.	
Madeira	Visa not required	Freedom of movement.; ID card valid.	
Mayotte	Visa not required	Freedom of movement.; ID card valid.	
Réunion	Visa not required	Freedom of movement.; ID card valid.	
Ascension Island	eVisa	3 months within any year period.	
Saint Helena	Visitor's Pass on arrival		Visitor's Pass granted on arrival valid for 4/10/21/60/90 days for 12/14/16/20/25 pound sterling.
Tristan da Cunha	Permission required		Permission to land required for 15/30 pounds sterling (yacht/ship passenger) for Tristan da Cunha Island or 20 pounds sterling for Gough Island, Inaccessible Island or Nightingale Islands.
Sahrawi Arab Democratic Republic	Visa not required	90 days	Same visa regime as Morocco.
Somaliland	Visa on arrival	30 days for 30 USD, payable on arrival.	
Sudan	Travel permit required		All foreigners traveling more than 25 kilometers outside of Khartoum must obtain a travel permit.
(Sudan) Darfur	Travel permit required		Separate travel permit is required.
Asia
(China) Hainan	Visa not required	30 days	Individual tourists need to select a tour agency and inform them their schedule.
Hong Kong	Visa not required	90 days	
India PAP/RAP	PAP/RAP required		Protected Area Permit (PAP) required for whole states of Nagaland and Sikkim and parts of states Manipur, Arunachal Pradesh, Uttaranchal, Jammu and Kashmir, Rajasthan, Himachal Pradesh. Restricted Area Permit (RAP) required for all of Andaman and Nicobar Islands and parts of Sikkim. Some of these requirements are occasionally lifted for a year.
Iraqi Kurdistan	eVisa	30 days	
Kazakhstan	Special permission required		Special permission required for the town of Baikonur and surrounding areas in Kyzylorda Oblast, and the town of Gvardeyskiy near Almaty.
(Iran) Kish Island	Visa not required		Visitors to Kish Island do not require a visa.
Macao	Visa not required	90 days	
(Malaysia) Sabah and Sarawak	Visa not required		These states have their own immigration authorities and passport is required to travel to them, however the same visa applies.
North Korea outside Pyongyang	Special permit required		People are not allowed to leave the capital city, tourists can only leave the capital with a governmental tourist guide (no independent moving)
Palestine	Visa not required		Arrival by sea to Gaza Strip not allowed.
Taiwan	Visa not required	90 days	
(Tajikistan) Gorno-Badakhshan Autonomous Province	OVIR permit required		OVIR permit required, can be obtained with e-visa application for an additional $20. Locally it may be obtained for 15+5 Tajikistani Somoni. Another special permit (free of charge) is required for Lake Sarez.
(China) Tibet Autonomous Region	TTP required		Tibet Travel Permit required (10 US Dollars).
Turkmenistan	Special permit required		A special permit, issued prior to arrival by Ministry of Foreign Affairs, is required if visiting the following places: Atamurat, Cheleken, Dashoguz, Serakhs and Serhetabat.
(United Nations) Korean Demilitarized Zone	Restricted zone		
(United Nations) UNDOF Zone and Ghajar	Restricted zone		
(Vietnam) Phú Quốc	Visa not required	30 days	
Yemen	Special permission required		Special permission needed for travel outside Sanaa or Aden.
Caribbean and North Atlantic
Azores	Visa not required	Freedom of movement; ID card valid.	
Anguilla	Visa not required	3 months	
Aruba	Visa not required	30 days, extendable to 180 days	
Bermuda	Visa not required	Up to 6 months, decided on arrival.	
(Netherlands) Bonaire, St. Eustatius and Saba	Visa not required	3 months	
British Virgin Islands	Visa not required	30 days, extensions possible	
Cayman Islands	Visa not required	6 months	
Curacao	Visa not required	3 months	
Greenland	Visa not required	90 days	
Guadeloupe	Visa not required	Freedom of movement.; ID card valid.	
Martinique	Visa not required	Freedom of movement.; ID card valid.	
Montserrat	Visa not required	6 months	ID card valid (max. 14 days)
Puerto Rico	ESTA	90 days (same as for USA)	
Saint Barthélemy	Visa not required		ID card valid.
Saint Martin	Visa not required	Freedom of movement.; ID card valid.	
Saint Pierre and Miquelon	Visa not required		ID card valid.
(Colombia) San Andrés and Leticia	Tourist Card on arrival		Visitors arriving at Gustavo Rojas Pinilla International Airport and Alfredo Vásquez Cobo International Airport must buy tourist cards on arrival.
Sint Maarten	Visa not required	3 months	
Turks and Caicos Islands	Visa not required	90 days	
U.S. Virgin Islands	ESTA	90 days	
Oceania
American Samoa	Electronic authorization	30 days	
(Australia) Ashmore and Cartier Islands	Special authorisation required		Special authorisation required.
(France) Clipperton Island	Special permit required		Special permit required.
Cook Islands	Visa not required	31 days	
(Fiji) Lau Province	Special permission required		Special permission required.
Guam	ESTA	90 days	
New Caledonia	Visa not required		ID card valid.
Niue	Visa not required	30 days	
Northern Mariana Islands	ESTA	90 days	
Pitcairn Islands	Visa not required	14 days	Landing fee 35 USD or tax of 5 USD if not going ashore.
French Polynesia	Visa not required		ID card valid.
Tokelau	Entry permit required		
United States Minor Outlying Islands	Special permits required		Special permits required for Baker Island, Howland Island, Jarvis Island, Johnston Atoll, Kingman Reef, Midway Atoll, Palmyra Atoll and Wake Island.
Wallis and Futuna	Visa not required		ID card valid.
South America
French Guiana	Visa not required	Freedom of movement.; ID card valid.	
Galápagos	Online pre-registration required		Online pre-registration is required. Transit Control Card must also be obtained at the airport prior to departure.
South Atlantic and Antarctica
Falkland Islands	Visa not required	1 month	A visitor permit is normally issued as a stamp in the passport on arrival.
South Georgia and the South Sandwich Islands	Permit required		Pre-arrival permit from the Commissioner required (72 hours/1 month for 110/160 pounds sterling).
Antarctica	Permit required		Special permits required for British Antarctic Territory, French Southern and Antarctic Lands, Argentine Antarctica, (Australia) Australian Antarctic Territory, (Antártica Chilena Province) Chilean Antarctic Territory, (Australia) Heard Island and McDonald Islands, (Norway) Peter I Island, (Norway) Queen Maud Land, (New Zealand) Ross Dependency.

== Non-ordinary passports ==
Holders of various categories of official passports have additional visa-free access to the following countries - Azerbaijan (diplomatic or service passports), Egypt (diplomatic or service passports), Indonesia (diplomatic or service passports), Ivory Coast (diplomatic or service passports), Pakistan (diplomatic or service passports), Russia (diplomatic passports), Turkey (diplomatic, official, service or special passports).

Holders of diplomatic or service passports of any country have visa-free access to Cape Verde, Ethiopia, Mali and Zimbabwe.

== Right to consular protection in non-EU countries ==
When in a non-EU country where there is no Austrian embassy, Austrian citizens as EU citizens have the right to get consular protection from the embassy of any other EU country present in that country.

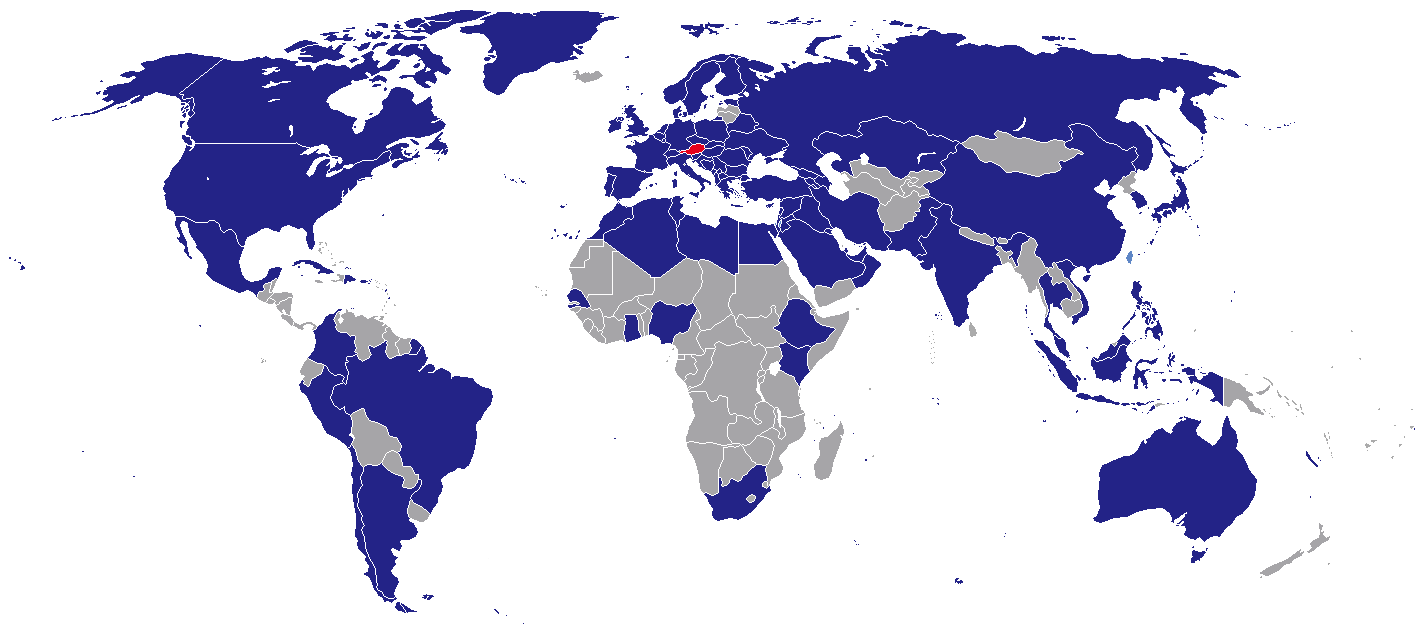
Diplomatic missions of Austria

See also List of diplomatic missions of Austria.

== Non-visa restrictions ==
=== Blank passport pages ===
Many countries require a minimum number of blank pages to be available in the passport being presented, typically one or two pages. Endorsement pages, which often appear after the visa pages, are not counted as being valid or available.

=== Vaccination ===
Cover of the new International Certificate of Vaccination issued by the Bureau of Quarantine in the Philippines since 2021

The African countries of Angola, Benin, Burkina Faso, Burundi, Cameroon, Central African Republic, Democratic Republic of the Congo, Republic of the Congo, Côte d'Ivoire, Gabon, Ghana, Guinea-Bissau, Mali, Niger, Sierra Leone and Togo, South Sudan and Uganda, along with French Guiana in South America, require all incoming passengers older than nine months to one year, to have a current International Certificate of Vaccination or Prophylaxis.

Some other countries require vaccination only if the passenger is coming from an infected area or has visited one recently or has transited for 12 hours in those countries: Algeria, Botswana, Cabo Verde, Chad, Djibouti, Egypt, Eswatini, Ethiopia, Gambia, Ghana, Guinea, Lesotho, Libya, Equatorial Guinea, Eritrea, Madagascar, Malawi, Mauritania, Mauritius, Mozambique, Namibia, Nigeria, Papua New Guinea, Seychelles, Somalia, South Africa, Sudan, Tunisia, Uganda, Tanzania, Zambia and Zimbabwe.

=== Passport validity length ===
Very few countries, such as Paraguay, just require a valid passport on arrival.

However many countries and groupings now require only an identity card – especially from their neighbours. Other countries may have special bilateral arrangements that depart from the generality of their passport validity length policies to shorten the period of passport validity required for each other's citizens or even accept passports that have already expired (but not been cancelled).

Some countries, such as Japan, Ireland and the United Kingdom, require a passport valid throughout the period of the intended stay.

In the absence of specific bilateral agreements, countries requiring passports to be valid for at least 6 more months on arrival include Afghanistan, Algeria, Anguilla, Bahrain, Bhutan, Botswana, British Virgin Islands, Brunei, Cambodia, Cameroon, Cape Verde, Cayman Islands, Central African Republic, Chad, Comoros, Costa Rica, Côte d'Ivoire, Curaçao, Ecuador, Egypt, El Salvador, Equatorial Guinea, Fiji, Gabon, Guinea Bissau, Guyana, Haiti, India, Indonesia, Iran, Iraq, Israel, Jordan, Kenya, Kiribati, Kuwait, Laos, Madagascar, Malaysia, Marshall Islands, Mongolia, Myanmar, Namibia, Nepal, Nicaragua, Nigeria, Oman, Palau, Papua New Guinea, Peru, Philippines, Qatar, Rwanda, Samoa, Saudi Arabia, Singapore, Solomon Islands, Somalia, Sri Lanka, Sudan, Suriname, Tanzania, Thailand, Timor-Leste, Tokelau, Tonga, Turkey, Tuvalu, Uganda, United Arab Emirates, Vanuatu, Venezuela, and Vietnam.

Countries requiring passports valid for at least 4 months on arrival include Micronesia and Zambia.

Countries requiring passports with a validity of at least 3 months beyond the date of intended departure include Azerbaijan, Bosnia and Herzegovina, Honduras, Montenegro, Nauru, Moldova and New Zealand. Similarly, the EEA countries of Iceland, Liechtenstein, Norway, all European Union countries (except Ireland) together with Switzerland also require 3 months validity beyond the date of the bearer's intended departure unless the bearer is an EEA or Swiss national.

Countries requiring passports valid for at least 3 months on arrival include Albania, North Macedonia, Panama, and Senegal.

Bermuda requires passports to be valid for at least 45 days upon entry.

Countries that require a passport validity of at least one month beyond the date of intended departure include Eritrea, Hong Kong, Lebanon, Macau, the Maldives and South Africa.

==== Maximum passport age ====
Countries of the Schengen area require non-EU passports to be less than 10 years old upon entry.

=== Criminal record ===
Some countries, including Australia, Canada, Fiji, New Zealand and the United States, routinely deny entry to non-citizens who have a criminal record, while others impose restrictions depending on the type of conviction and the length of the sentence.

=== Persona non grata ===
The government of a country can declare a diplomat persona non grata, banning them from entering the country or expelling them if they have already entered. In non-diplomatic use, the authorities of a country may also declare a foreigner persona non grata permanently or temporarily, usually because of unlawful activity.

=== Israeli stamps ===
Kuwait, Lebanon, Libya, and Yemen do not allow entry to people with passport stamps from Israel or whose passports have either a used or an unused Israeli visa, or where there is evidence of previous travel to Israel such as entry or exit stamps from neighbouring border posts in transit countries such as Jordan and Egypt.

To circumvent this Arab League boycott of Israel, the Israeli immigration services have now mostly ceased to stamp foreign nationals' passports on either entry to or exit from Israel (unless the entry is for some work-related purposes). Since 15 January 2013, Israel no longer stamps foreign passports at Ben Gurion Airport. Passports are still (as of 22 June 2017) stamped at Erez when passing into and out of Gaza.

Iran refuses admission to holders of passports containing an Israeli visa or stamp that is less than 12 months old.

=== Biometrics ===
Several countries mandate that all travellers, or all foreign travellers, be fingerprinted on arrival and will refuse admission to or even arrest travellers who refuse to comply. In some countries, such as the United States, this may apply even to transit passengers who merely wish to change planes rather than go landside.

Fingerprinting countries/regions include Afghanistan, Argentina, Brunei, Cambodia, China, Ethiopia, Ghana, Guinea, India, Japan, Kenya (both fingerprints and a photo are taken), Malaysia upon entry and departure, Mongolia, Saudi Arabia, the Schengen Area, Singapore, South Korea, Taiwan, Thailand, Uganda, the United Arab Emirates and the United States.

Many countries also require a photo be taken of people entering the country. The United States, which does not fully implement exit control formalities at its land frontiers (although long mandated by its own legislation), intends to implement facial recognition for passengers departing from international airports to identify people who overstay their visa.

Together with fingerprint and face recognition, iris scanning is one of three biometric identification technologies internationally standardised since 2006 by the International Civil Aviation Organization (ICAO) for use in e-passports and the United Arab Emirates conducts iris scanning on visitors who need to apply for a visa. The United States Department of Homeland Security has announced plans to greatly increase the biometric data it collects at US borders. In 2018, Singapore began trials of iris scanning at three land and maritime immigration checkpoints.

== See also ==
- Visa requirements for European Union citizens
- Austrian passport
