= Driving licence in Austria =

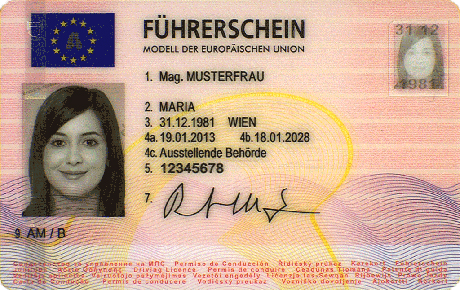
Driving licence in Austria

In Austria, the driving licence is a governmental right given to those who request a licence for any of the categories they desire. It is required for every type of motorized vehicle. The minimum age to obtain a driving licence is: 16 years for a motorcycle, 17/18 years for a car, and 21 years for buses and cargo vehicles.

== Obtaining a Driver's Licence ==
The Austrian driving licence can be obtained after finishing a driving school and passing a two-stage test, the theory test and road test.

== Riding bikes with class B ==
B licence holders are allowed to ride motorcycles not exceeding 125cc, when they hold their licence for at least five years without interruption and complete a basic training of 6 hours, but with no driving test. Afterwards the driving licence will be re-issued, because the national code 111 is added.

The Ministry of Transport requested from other EU member states whether Austrians are also allowed to drive within their territories and Portugal, Spain, Italy, the Czech Republic and Latvia agreed, that according to their national laws this is allowed, provided that all national provisions are fulfilled.

== Firemen driving licence ==
The Austrian firemen driving licence is intended for use by fire departments. It allows firemen to drive fire-fighting vehicles up to 5,500 kilograms (12,100 lb) gross vehicle weight with the driving licence class B.

== Gallery of historic images ==
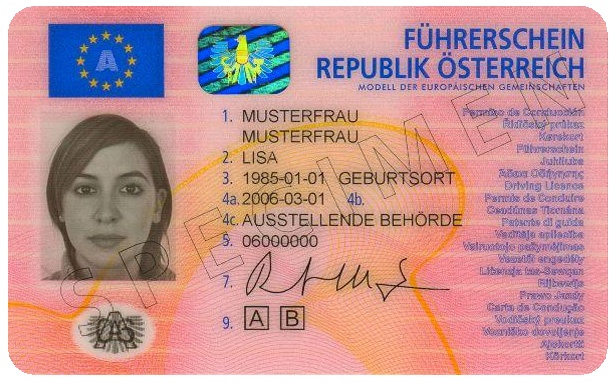
Old Austrian driving licence (Replaced 2013)

== See also ==
- European driving licence
- Vehicle registration plates of Austria
- Austrian identity card
- Austrian passport
