= Naturalization of Adolf Hitler =

Adolf Hitler

Dietrich Klagges

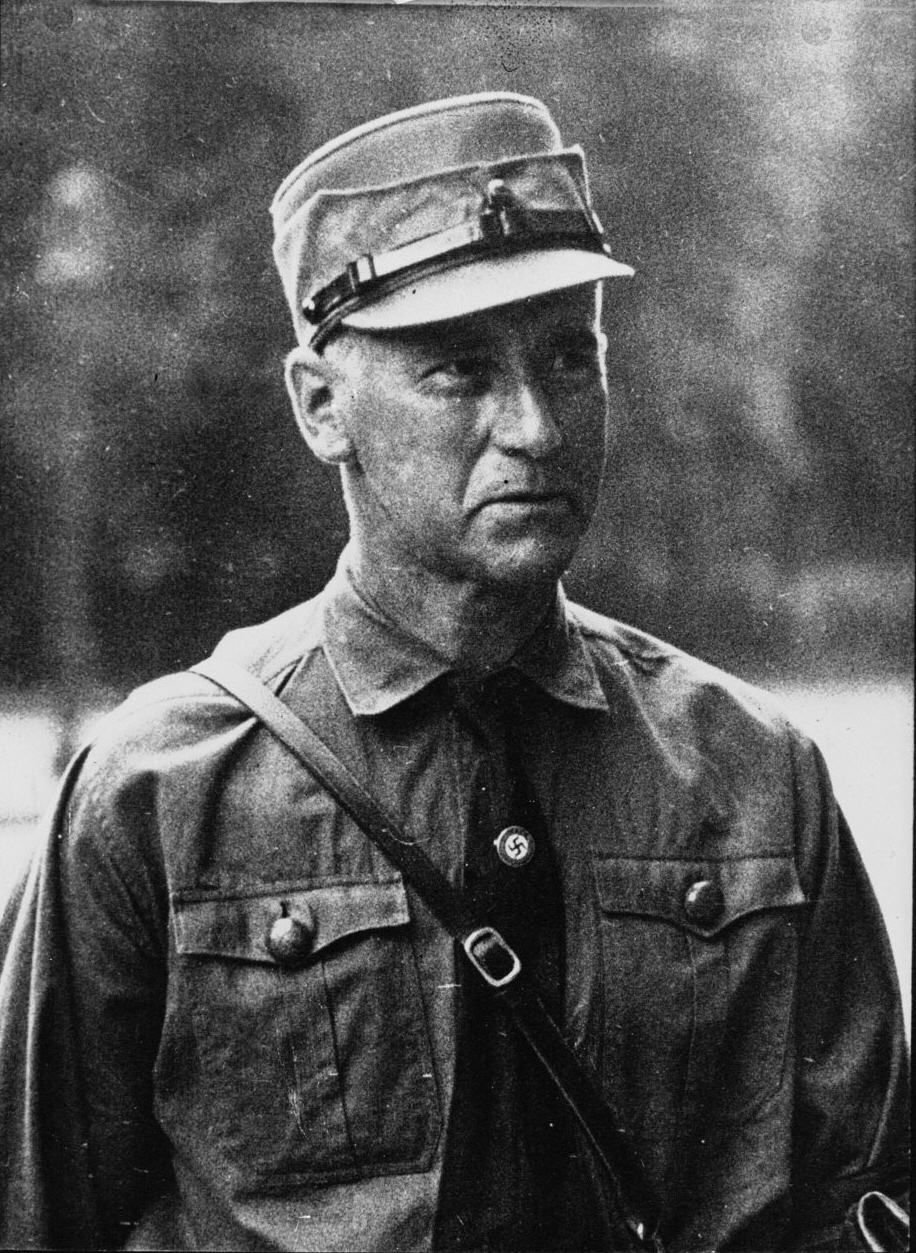
Wilhelm Frick

Adolf Hitler, dictator of Nazi Germany from 1933 to 1945, took naturalization process for seven years, from April 1925 to February 1932, when Hitler finally became a German citizen and was able to run for political office.

== History ==
=== Background ===
Hitler, who was born in Braunau am Inn in 1889, was an Austrian citizen by descent. He grew up in Passau, Fischlham, Leonding, and Linz, and moved to Vienna in 1907, where he hoped to become an artist. Hitler applied twice for admission to the Academy of Fine Arts Vienna, but was rejected on both occasions because of insufficient talent. The director of the academy later told him in a personal interview that he was "unsuited to be a painter".

Because of severe financial difficulties, he was forced to live in a homeless shelter from 1909 and, from early 1910, in the Meldemannstraße dormitory, where he became acquainted with, among others, Rudolf Häusler. Together with Häusler, he moved in 1913 to Munich, occupying a flat on Schleißheimer Straße, as he harboured a profound dislike toward the Austro-Hungarian multi-ethnic state and wished to avoid military service there. Upon arriving in Munich, Häusler and Hitler registered with the authorities; Häusler presented his complete documents, while Hitler claimed to possess no papers and to be stateless.

=== Attempted avoidance of military examination in Austria ===
In Austria, men born in 1889 were called upon in the autumn of 1909 to register for the main military examination to be held in spring 1910. Hitler did not comply with this summons. In the Upper Austrian Provincial Archives (OÖLA) in Linz (then still Hitler's official home municipality), a list of names records on three occasions up to 1913 that Hitler was "unjustifiably absent because his whereabouts could not be determined".

Hitler later claimed that he had not reported in the autumn of 1909 but had appeared in February 1910 at the conscription office in Vienna City Hall, where he was directed to the district of Brigittenau, since the men's homeless shelter on Meldemannstraße where he resided belonged to that district. According to Hitler, he requested permission to undergo the examination in Vienna and was never contacted again. No documentary evidence exists for these claims. Hitler also failed to appear for the required follow-up examinations in 1911 and 1912. Why he was not summoned remains unclear: since Hitler remained officially registered with the police throughout this period, the authorities could have located him.

On 24 May 1913, Hitler deregistered with the police but did not state where he intended to move. On 25 May, he travelled by train to Munich. There he falsely described himself during police registration as stateless. The reason was likely that Austrian records listed him as having evaded military examination and that he expected criminal prosecution as a result.

In January 1914, however, the Austrian authorities succeeded in locating Hitler in the Kingdom of Bavaria and issued an official summons, dated 12 January 1914, ordering him to present himself immediately for military examination in Linz under threat of a fine of up to 2,000 kronen or a substitute prison sentence ranging from four weeks to one year. Hitler wrote a lengthy letter in his defence and requested that the examination be conducted in Salzburg rather than Linz for financial reasons. This request was granted. On 5 February 1914, Hitler underwent examination in Salzburg, was declared unfit for military service because of physical weakness, and was classified as "unfit for bearing arms". He subsequently returned to Munich. Following the outbreak of World War I, he volunteered for service in the Bavarian Army on 3 August 1914.

Hitler was assigned to the 16th Bavarian Reserve Infantry Regiment and served primarily as a dispatch runner until only a few days before the armistice in November 1918. For this reason, he was not required to respond to any call-up to the Austro-Hungarian Landsturm. Consequently, after extensive review in 1932, the Austrian War Archives and other government bodies concluded that Hitler could not properly be described as having evaded military examination.

=== Beer Hall Putsch, imprisonment, and consequences ===
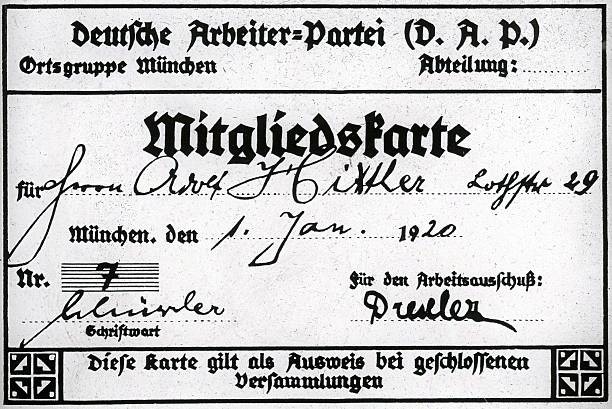
Hitler's membership card in the German Workers' Party (DAP)

After returning to Munich, and remaining a soldier until his discharge from military service on 31 March 1920, Hitler directly experienced the upheavals of the post-war period, including the fall of the monarchy, the transformation into the revolutionary Bavarian Soviet Republic, and finally the establishment of the Weimar Republic. Initially, he was planted in the German Workers' Party (DAP) as an informant by the future SA leader Ernst Röhm, who had access to army funds from the Anti-Bolshevik League, because the party was suspected of being a left-wing workers' party. Hitler joined the DAP in September 1919. Four months later, on 24 February 1920, the National Socialist German Workers' Party (NSDAP) emerged from it at his initiative. From that point onward, Hitler's influence expanded beyond Munich. On 8–9 November 1923, the unsuccessful Beer Hall Putsch took place, after which Hitler was convicted of high treason and imprisoned at Landsberg Prison.

Although Hitler was still an Austrian citizen at the time, and the Law for the Protection of the Republic required deportation in such cases, no deportation took place. During the putsch, the Reich government had been incorrectly informed regarding Hitler's nationality. In its proclamation "To the German People!" of 9 November 1923, it stated:

... In Munich, an armed mob has overthrown the Bavarian government ... and has presumed ... to appoint Mr Hitler, who only recently acquired German citizenship, to direct the destiny of Germany. ... The Reich President: signed Ebert. The Reich Government: signed Dr. Stresemann, Reich Chancellor.

While imprisoned, Hitler publicly declared in October 1924 that he did not regard the loss of Austrian citizenship as painful, since he had "always felt only German". In Mein Kampf, Hitler wrote: "I did not wish to fight for the Habsburg state, but I was prepared to die for my people and for the Reich that embodied it."

==== Bavarian attempt at deportation ====
The Bavarian state government had long known that Hitler was not, as he had repeatedly claimed, stateless but remained an Austrian citizen. Even before Hitler's early release from prison on 20 December 1924, it therefore sought to deport the politically troublesome agitator and convicted traitor to his homeland. On 28 March 1924, the Munich Police Headquarters formally inquired with the Upper Austrian provincial government in Linz as to whether it would object to such a deportation.

Initially, nothing appeared to stand in the way of deportation to Austria. However, the Austrian Federal Chancellery under Chancellor Ignaz Seipel became aware of the matter on 27 September 1924, intervened, and thereby transformed it into a political issue. Following extensive correspondence between Linz and Vienna, the Federal Chancellery instructed the Upper Austrian provincial government on 11 October to refuse Hitler entry into Austria or, if necessary, intern him should he attempt to enter the country. The federal government stated that it did not share the view regarding "the nationality and right of domicile of Adolf Hitler", because he had "resided outside Austria for more than ten years and served in the German Army".

The court explained why it rejected the deportation of Hitler under the terms of the Protection of the Republic Act:

Hitler is a German-Austrian. He considered himself to be a German. In the opinion of the court, the meaning and the terms of section 9, para II of the Law for the Protection of the Republic cannot apply to a man who thinks and feels as German as Hitler, who voluntarily served for four and a half years in the German army at war, who attained high military honours through outstanding bravery in the face of the enemy, was wounded, suffered other damage to his health, and was released from the military into the control of the district Command Munich I“.

Thus, since the court refused to deport Hitler, he was allowed to remain in Germany.

When Hitler's legal status became a matter of public discussion in 1924, he made a public declaration which was printed on 16 October 1924 that stated:

The loss of my Austrian citizenship is not painful to me, as I never felt as an Austrian citizen but always as a German only. ... It was this mentality that made me draw the ultimate conclusion and do military service in the German Army.

=== Statelessness (1925–1932) ===
On April 7, 1925, Hitler applied to the High Magistrate of Linz in order to be released from his Austrian citizenship:

I request that I be released from my Austrian citizenship. Reasons: I have been in Germany since 1912, served in the German army for almost 6 years, including 4½ years at the front, and now intend to acquire German citizenship.

As I currently do not know whether my Austrian citizenship has already expired, but entry to Austrian soil has been rejected by an order from the federal government, I ask for a favorable decision on my application.

— Adolf Hitler

On 30 April 1925, Hitler's request was approved upon payment of a fee of 7.50 schillings. As a result, he lived on German territory as a stateless person from that date onward, stating it clearly and officially wherever he went—a circumstance that, according to his own statement in 1932, displeased him because "I, of all Germans, was not naturalized, at a time when 200,000 to 300,000 East Galician Jews and profiteers had been granted citizenship."

At this point Hitler began trying to acquire German citizenship in various ways, while also being involved in the rebuilding of the Nazi Party from the ground up. Hitler nevertheless retained his old Austrian passport.

The easier way to become a German citizen was to become a Beamter, a German civil servant, because it automatically resulted in naturalization, in accordance to the 1913 Reich and Nationality Act.

==== Naturalization attempts ====
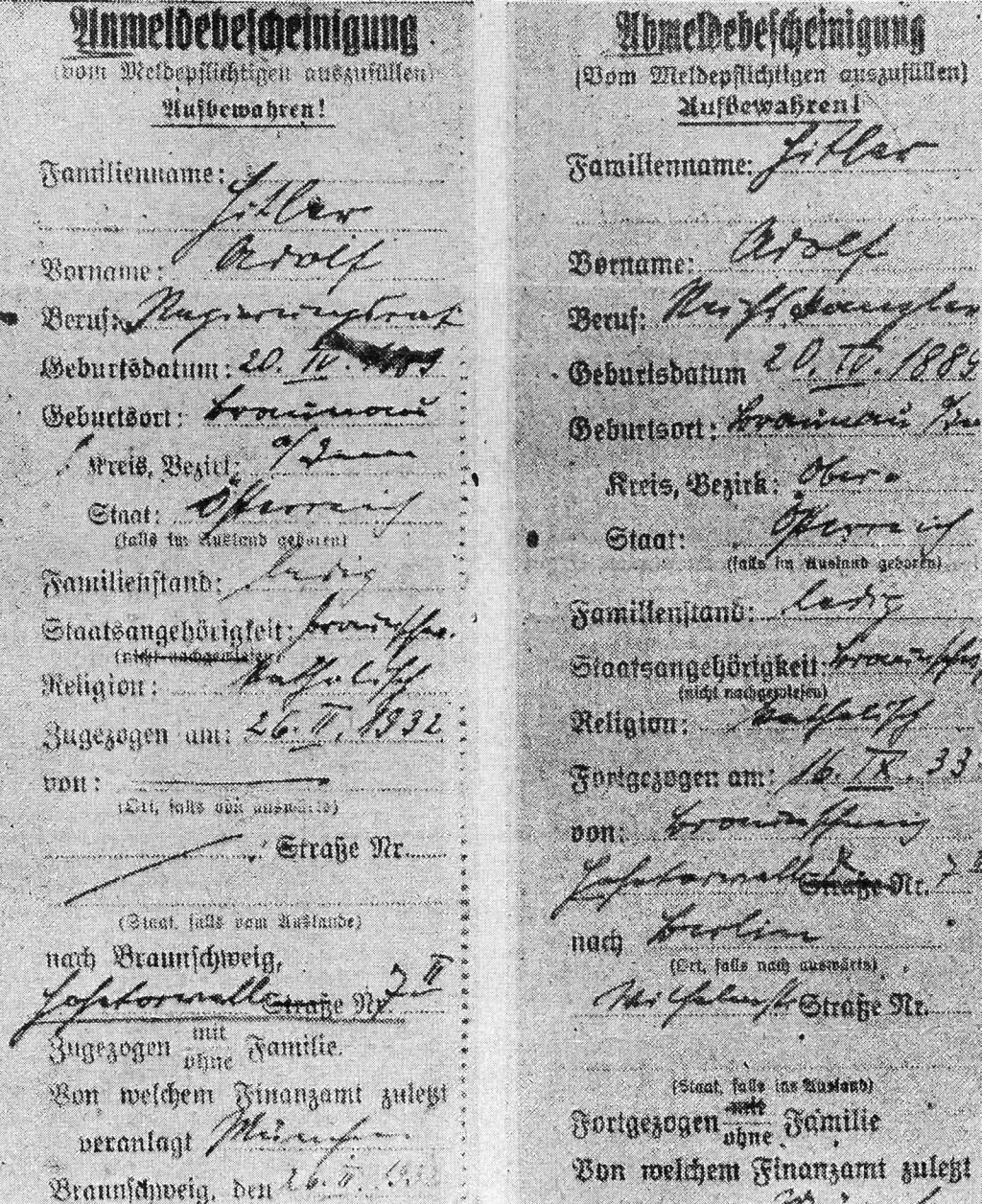
Hitler's registration and deregistration as subtenant in Braunschweig, 1932–1933

Wilhelm Frick, the first Nazi minister in a local German cabinet and a member of the national Reichstag in 1924, tried to force the Bavarian government to grant citizenship to Hitler in 1929 and then to nominate him professor of art at Bauhaus University in Weimar, but failed, as the government was not willing to hire anyone new in that position.

Another attempt was made only a few months later, in July 1930: the Thuringian state parliament was in summer recess and Frick thus gained power over political affairs for a time, as prescribed by the parliament's rules. Frick found no objections to his plan to make Hitler a gendarmerie commissioner in the Thuringian district town of Hildburghausen. Everything was done in secret and the task was accomplished, but Hitler ultimately refused, because that job did not suit him even from a purely formal point of view, thus canceling the naturalization process attempt.

The next attempt was made at the Free State of Brunswick in 1931, where some Nazis were part of the local government: in particular interior minister Dietrich Klagges, who received the order to naturalize Hitler quickly. Klagges had the idea of appointing him professor for Organic Social Studies and Politics, made possible by making a professorship vacant: SPD member August Riekel was fired for this purpose. But these shenanigans came to be fiercely debated in the Braunschweig state parliament and thus impossible to carry out.

In January 1932, the scheme was uncovered, leading to the establishment of a parliamentary committee of inquiry. Hitler and several other Nazi politicians were called to testify, though Hitler largely failed to remember most facts and no further legal action was pursued.

Hitler wanted to run in the 1932 presidential election and needed to obtain German citizenship quickly in order to do so. After the scheme was uncovered in January, Klagges had to involve the DVP in order to act with more discretion. Following some debate, which also involved Hans Frank and Ernst Zörner (President of the Braunschweig State Parliament and a friend of Hitler), a solution was found: Hitler was to be placed in the Braunschweig legation to the Reichsrat in Berlin.

To meet legal requirements, Hitler had to be a resident of Braunschweig and became Zörner's subtenant, officially reporting to him from February 26, 1932, to September 16, 1933.

On February 26, 1932, Hitler was sworn in during a ceremony at the Hotel Kaiserhof in Berlin, receiving citizenship from both the Free State of Braunschweig and the Reich. The naturalization process was officially completed on March 1, 1932.

=== Anschluss ===
Hitler said as a personal note to the annexation of Austria to the German Reich in the 1938 Anschluss:

I, myself, as Führer and Chancellor, will be happy to walk on the soil of the country that is my home as a free German citizen.

==== Aftermath ====
An attempt was made to revoke Hitler's German citizenship in 2007, but this effort failed.

== See also ==
- Adolf Hitler's rise to power
