= Personalausweis =

Personalausweis may refer to:

- Austrian identity card
- German identity card
