= Austrian passport =

Travel document

Austrian passport; Österreichischer Reisepass
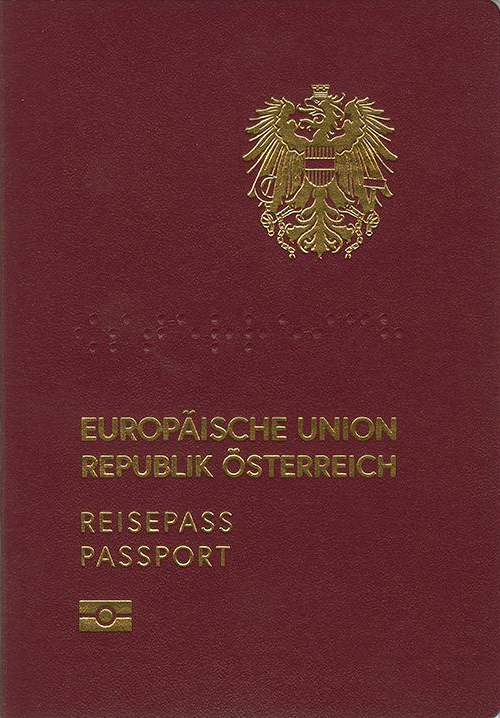
- Front cover of an Austrian biometric passport (2024)

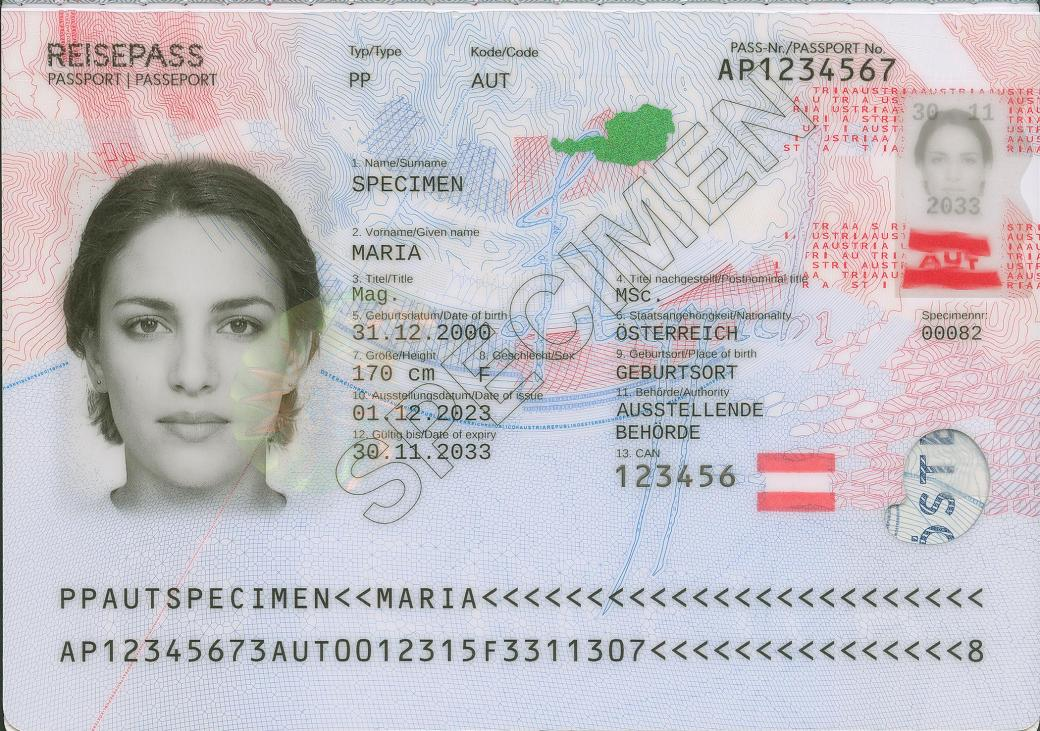
- Biodata page of an Austrian biometric passport (2024)
- Type: Passport
- Issued by: Local Governments in Austria
- First issued: 1857 (first passport regulations, as Austrian Empire); 16 June 2006 (biometric); 1 December 2023 (current version)
- Purpose: Identification
- Eligibility: Austrian citizenship
- Expiration: 2 years after issuance for children up to the age of 1; 5 years for children aged 2–11; 10 years for citizens aged 12 and older
- Cost: €112.00

An Austrian passport (German: Österreichischer Reisepass) is an identity document issued to citizens of Austria to facilitate international travel. Every Austrian citizen is also a citizen of the European Union. The passport, along with the national identity card, allows for free rights of movement and residence in any of the states of the European Economic Area and Switzerland.

== Issuance and validity ==
The passports can be applied for and are issued at magistrates and district captaincies, as well as selected municipal offices, then are manufactured centrally at the Österreichische Staatsdruckerei in Vienna.

=== Physical appearance ===
Austrian passports are the same burgundy colour as other European passports, with the Austrian coat of arms emblazoned in the centre of the front cover. The words "EUROPÄISCHE UNION" (English: European Union) and "REPUBLIK ÖSTERREICH" (English: Republic of Austria) are inscribed above the coat of arms and the word "REISEPASS" (English: Passport) is inscribed below it. Austrian passports have the standard biometric symbol at the bottom and use the standard EU design. Each page of the passport shows the coat of arms of a different Austrian state in the background. A new passport design was introduced in December 2023.

=== Different spellings of the same name within the same document ===
German names containing umlauts (ä, ö, ü) and/or ß are spelled in the correct way in the non-machine-readable zone of the passport, but with simple vowel + E and/or SS in the machine-readable zone, e.g. Müller becomes MUELLER, Groß becomes GROSS, and Gößmann becomes GOESSMANN.

The transcription mentioned above is generally used for airplane tickets etc., but sometimes (like in US visas) also simple vowels are used (MULLER, GOSSMANN). The three possible spelling variants of the same name (e.g. Müller / Mueller / Muller) in different documents sometimes lead to confusion, and the use of two different spellings within the same document (like in the passport) may give people who are unfamiliar with the German orthography the impression that the document is a forgery.

Austrian passports may (but do not always) contain a trilingual (in German, English, and French) explanation of the German umlauts and ß, e.g. 'ß' entspricht / is equal to / correspond à 'SS'.

== Visa requirements ==
Visa requirements for Austrian citizens Austria Freedom of movement Visa not required / ESTA / eTA / eVisitor Visa on arrival eVisa Visa available both on arrival or online Visa required prior to arrival

Visa requirements for Austrian citizens are administrative entry restrictions imposed by the authorities of foreign states on citizens of Austria. As of 4 January 2024, Austrian citizens had visa-free or visa on arrival access (including eTAs) to 194 countries and territories, ranking the Austrian passport 3rd in the world in terms of travel freedom (tied with Finnish, Luxembourg, and Swedish passports) according to the Henley Passport Index.

Austrian citizens can live and work in any country within the EU as a result of the right of free movement and residence granted in Article 21 of the EU Treaty.

== Holding a second passport ==
Austria allows its citizens to hold a second Austrian passport to circumvent certain travel restrictions. Some countries in the Arab League do not allow entry to passport holders of any nationality with Israeli visas or passport stamps.

Holding an Austrian passport and a foreign passport at the same time—i.e., dual citizenship—is restricted under the current Austrian nationality law. In general, only those who acquired multiple citizenships at birth can have dual/multiple citizenship. Dual citizenship is also permitted for descendants of persecuted persons, such as descendants of Holocaust survivors. Austrians who voluntarily acquire citizenship of another country automatically lose their Austrian citizenship, unless they have obtained permission to retain their Austrian citizenship (German: Beibehaltung der Staatsbürgerschaft) beforehand.

== History ==
Before Austria became a member of the European Union in 1995, passports had an outer light brown/inner dark brown cover ("Serie A–F") until sometime during the 1970s, when it switched to a dark green cover. The series of brown passports used various security featured that were abandoned with the introduction of the green models.

Also, there was no need for a 2nd passport of a wife, she was added to the passport and an additional photo inserted. Up to four kids were added by listing these in the passport with names, age (not date of birth) and sex, no descriptions needed, no photos. Starting with "Serie A" the name of the passport holder was written to the outside, this also was abandoned with the green and later models.

== Image gallery ==
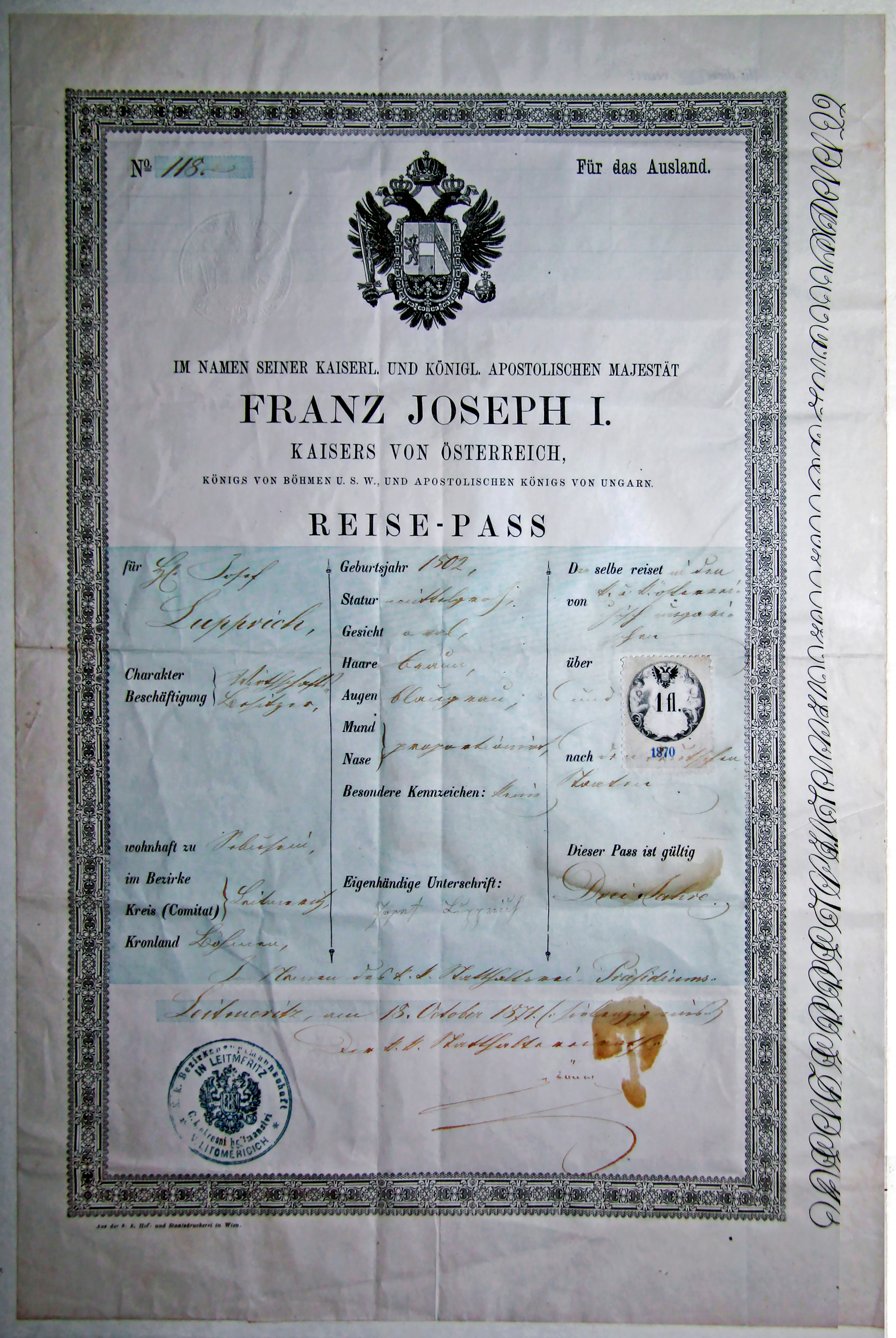
Austro-Hungarian Empire passport issued in Bohemia in 1871

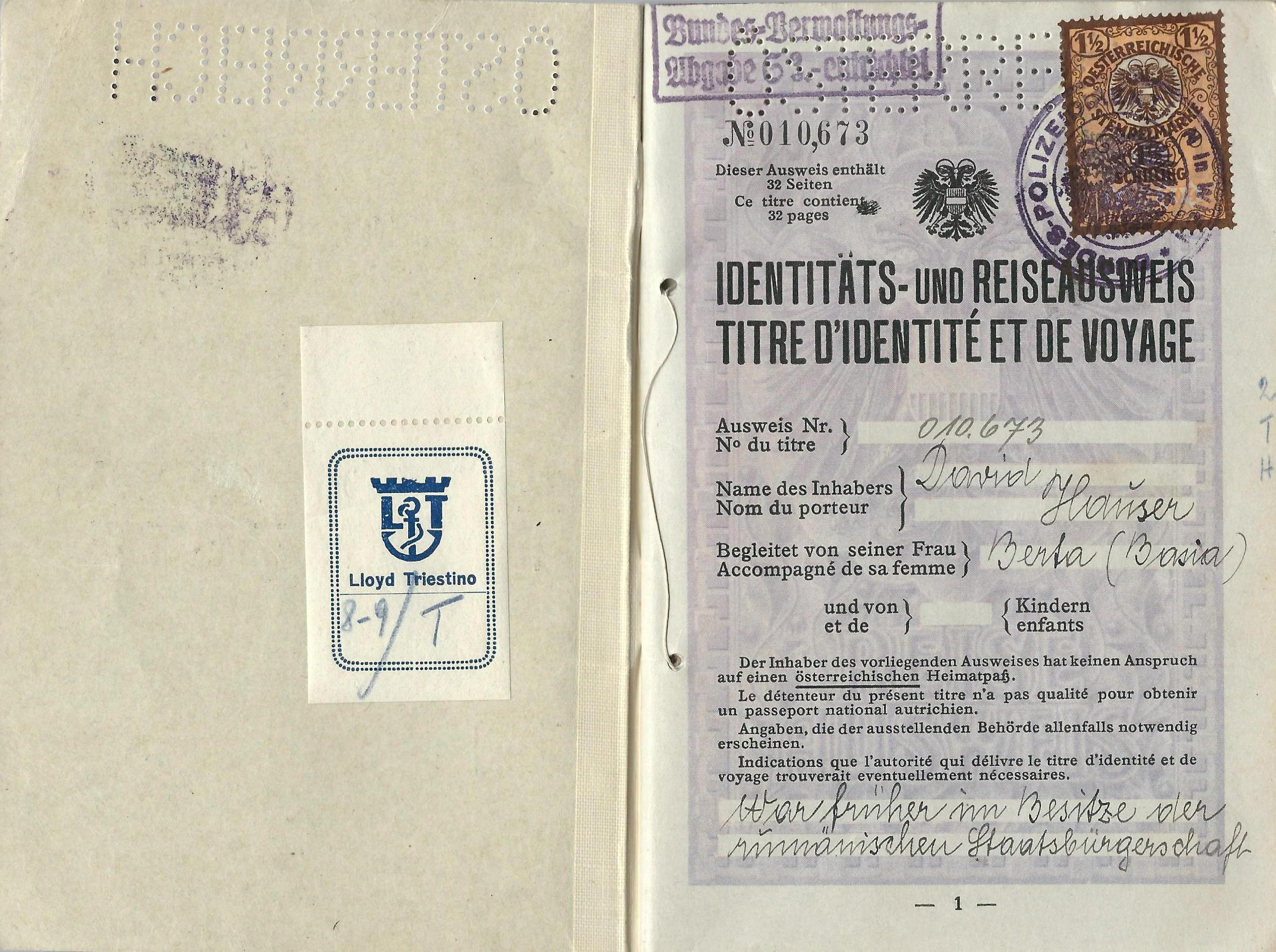
1936 Austrian stateless passport used for immigrating to Mandatory Palestine

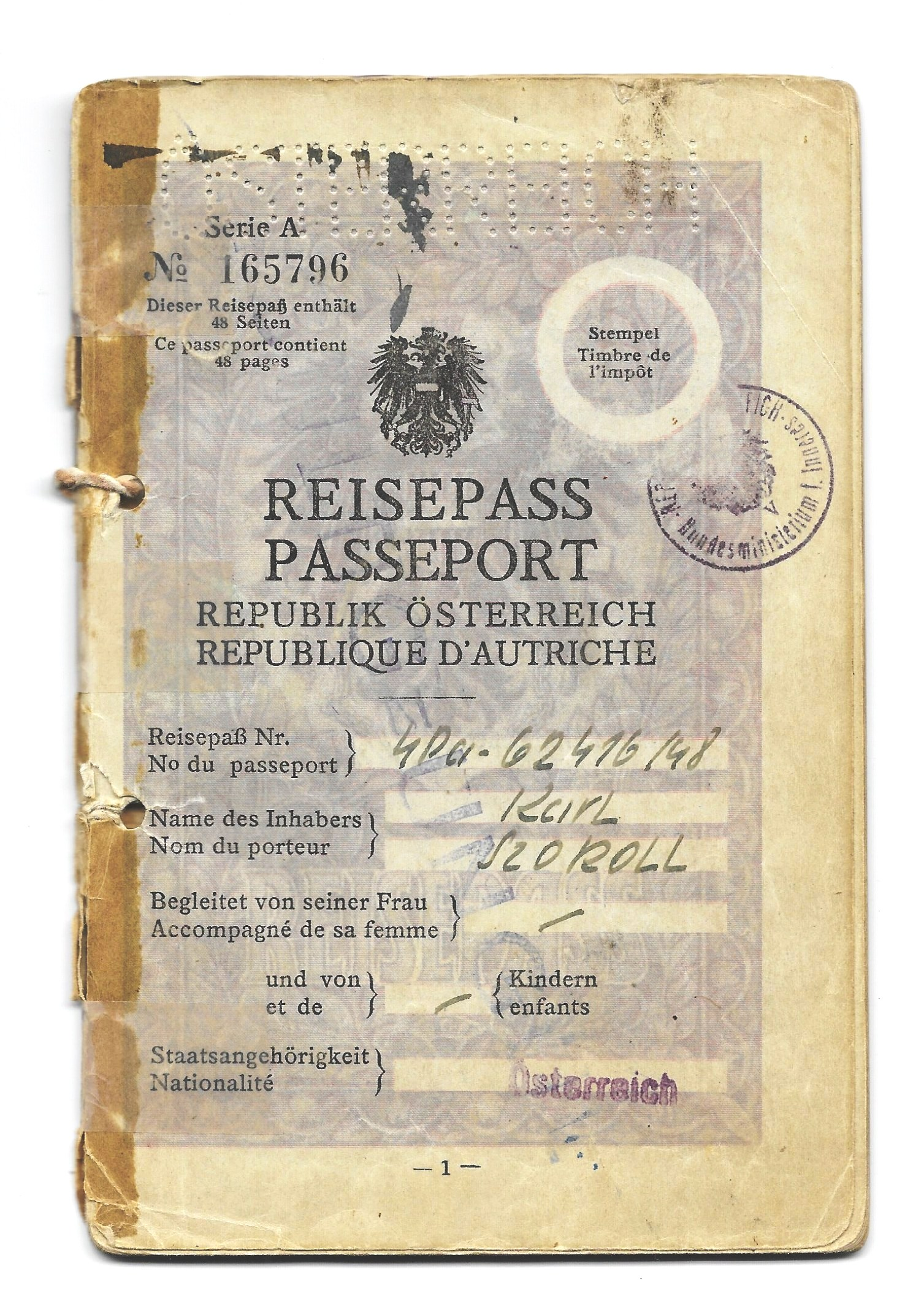
"Serie A" Austrian passport, issued to Carl Szokoll in 1948

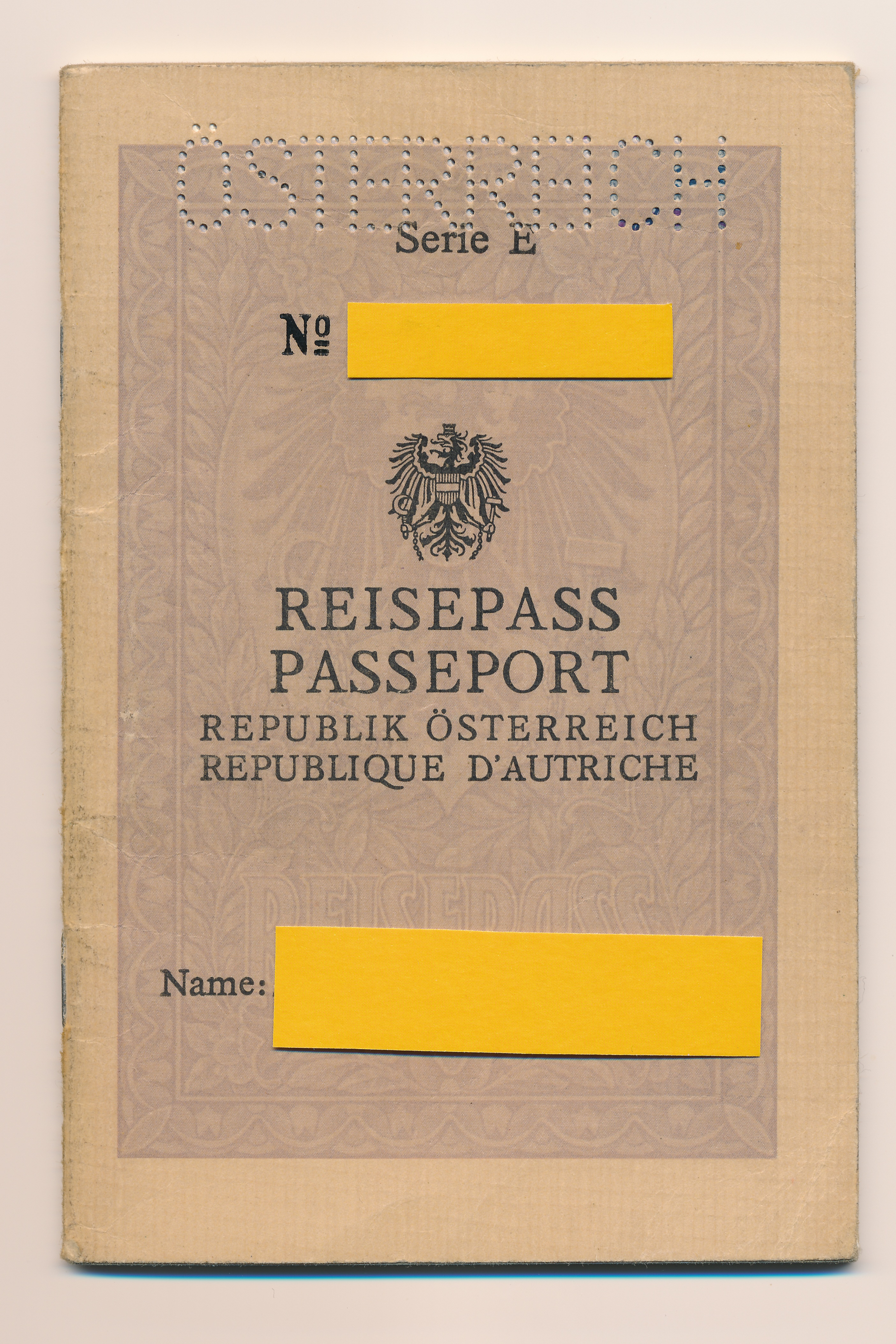
"Serie E" Austrian passport, issued in 1970

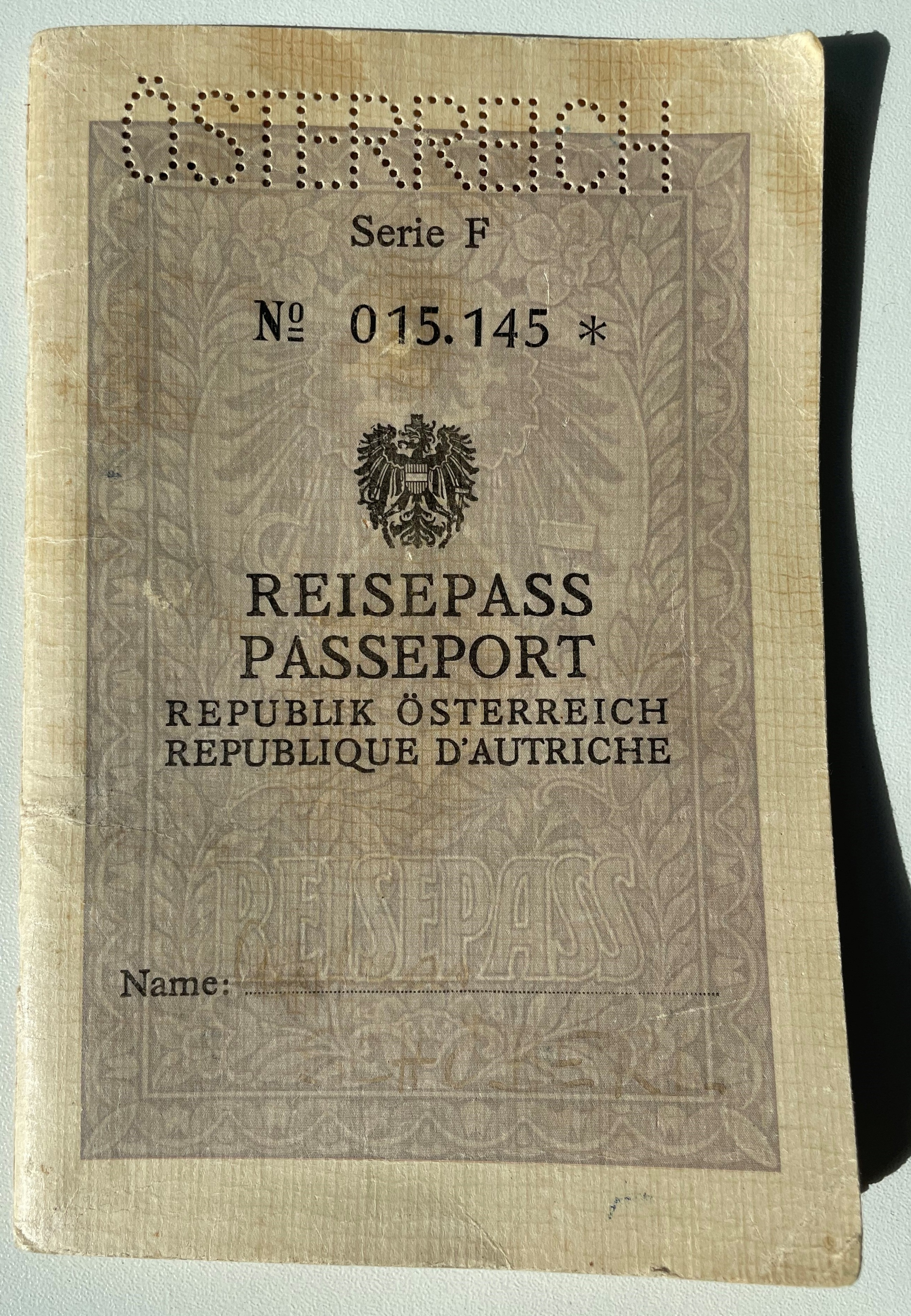
"Series F" Austrian Passport, issued 1970

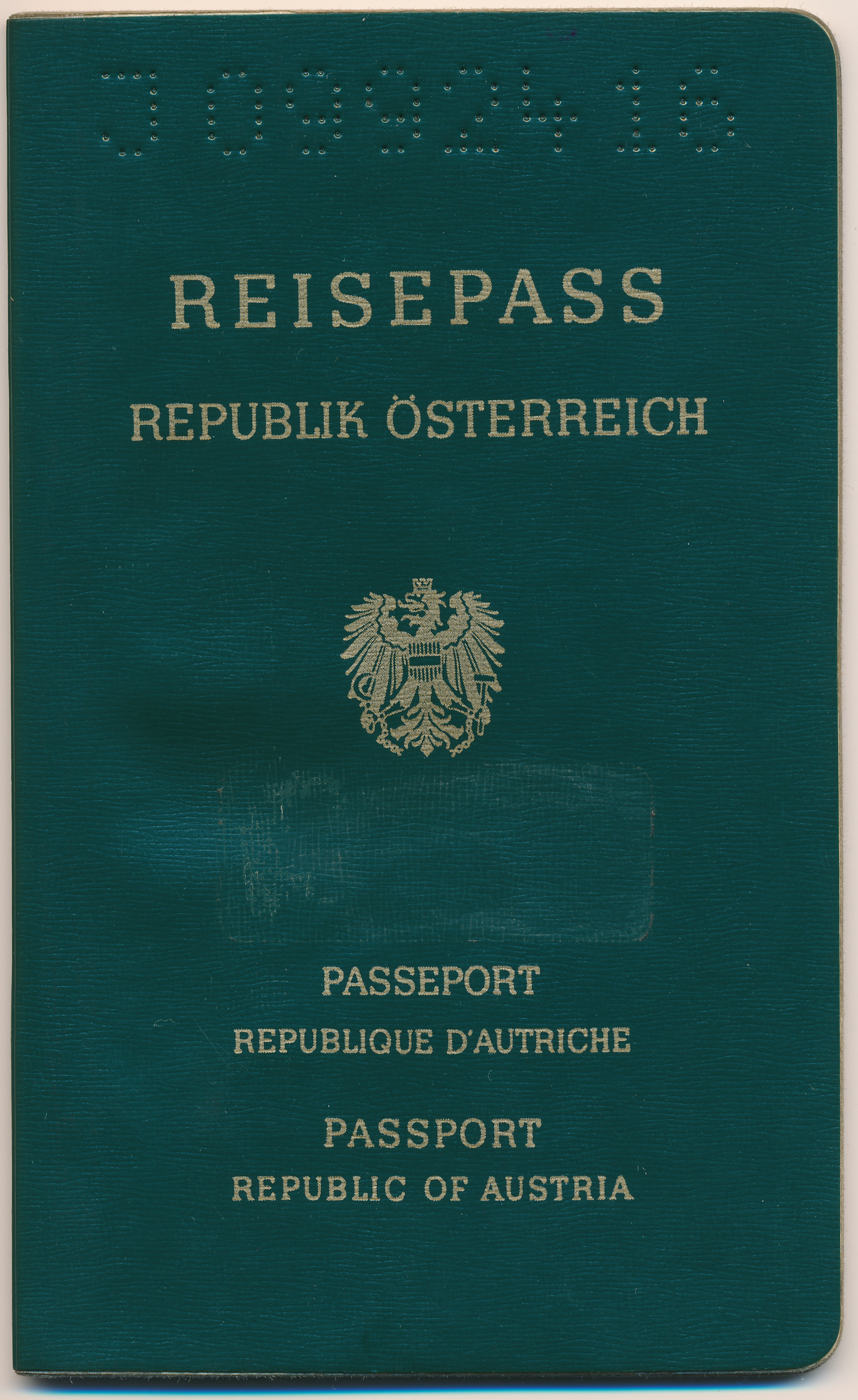
"Green cover" Austrian passport, issued in 1980

An Austrian diplomatic passport (2006–2014)

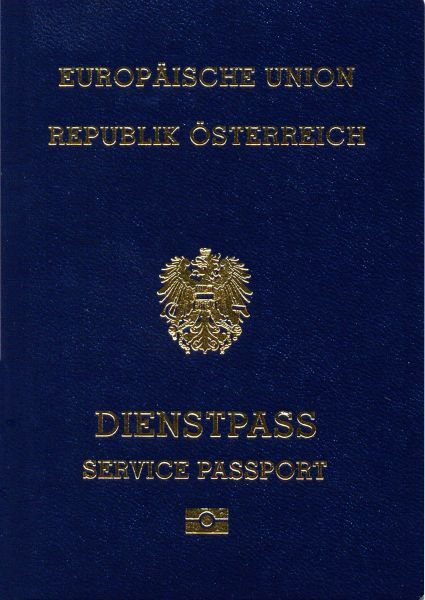
An Austrian service passport (2006–2014)

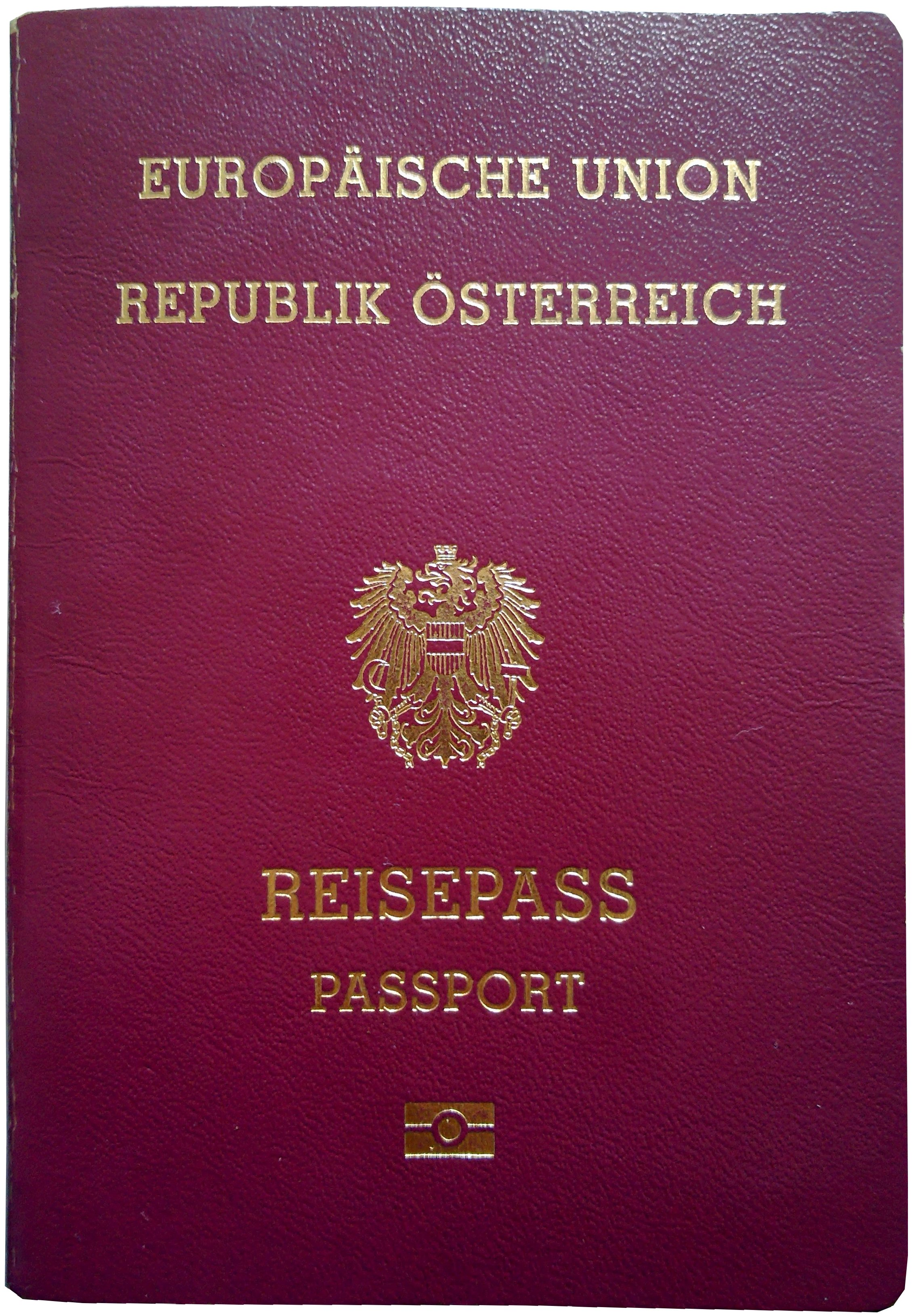
An Austrian ordinary passport (2014–2023)

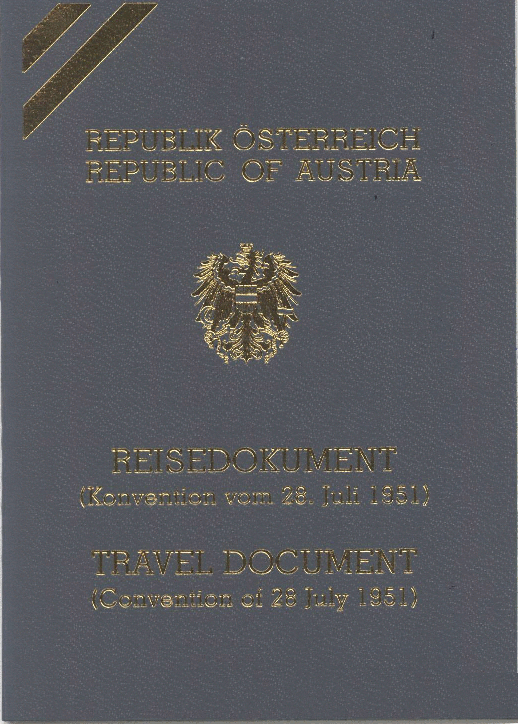
Refugee Convention travel document

== See also ==
- Visa requirements for Austrian citizens
- Passports of the European Union
