= Dietrich Klagges =

German Nazi politician & SS general (1891–1971)

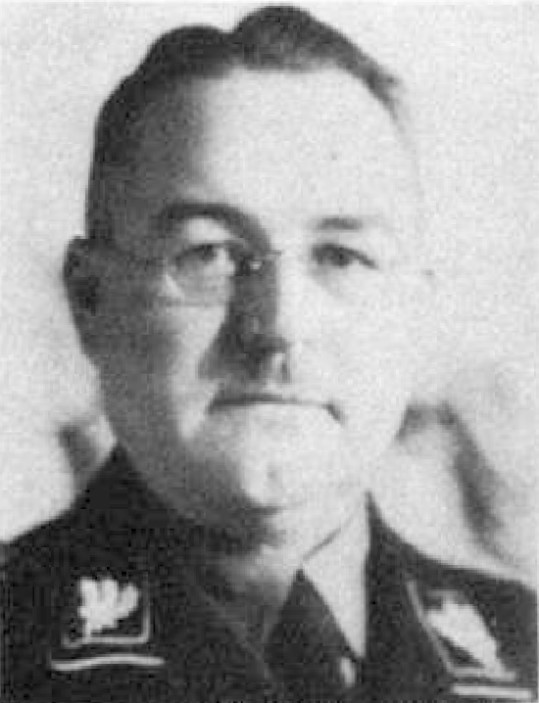
- Klagges, c. 1938

Ministerpräsident Free State of Brunswick
- In office 6 May 1933 – 12 April 1945
- Preceded by: Werner Küchenthal
- Succeeded by: Hubert Schlebusch

Interior and Education Minister Free State of Brunswick
- In office 15 September 1931 – 12 April 1945
- Preceded by: Anton Franzen

Additional positions
- 1932–1945: Reichstag Deputy
- 1933: Landtag of Brunswick Deputy

Personal details
- Born: 1 February 1891 Herringsen, Province of Westphalia, Kingdom of Prussia, German Empire
- Died: 12 November 1971 (aged 80) Bad Harzburg, West Germany
- Party: Nazi Party
- Other political affiliations: German National People's Party; German Völkisch Freedom Party
- Profession: Teacher
- Known for: Obtaining German citizenship for Adolf Hitler
- Civilian awards: Golden Party Badge

Military service
- Allegiance: German Empire
- Branch/service: Imperial German Army
- Years of service: 1911; 1915–1916
- Unit: 15th Infantry Regiment (2nd Westphalian); 13th Infantry Regiment (1st Westphalian)
- Battles/wars: World War I
- Military awards: Wound Badge in black

Dietrich Klagges (German pronunciation: [ˈdiːtʁɪç ˈklaɡəs]; 1 February 1891 – 12 November 1971) was a German politician of the Nazi Party who from 1933 to 1945 was the Ministerpräsident of the Free State of Brunswick. He also went by the pseudonym Rudolf Berg. Klagges is best known for obtaining German citizenship for Adolf Hitler in 1932, thereby making him eligible to run for political office. He was responsible for the persecution of Jews and Social Democratic opponents in Brunswick, resulting in imprisonments and deaths. He was also an SS-Obergruppenführer. Following the end of the Second World War, Klagges was arrested and stood trial for his crimes; he was convicted, imprisoned and released in 1957.

== Youth and early career ==
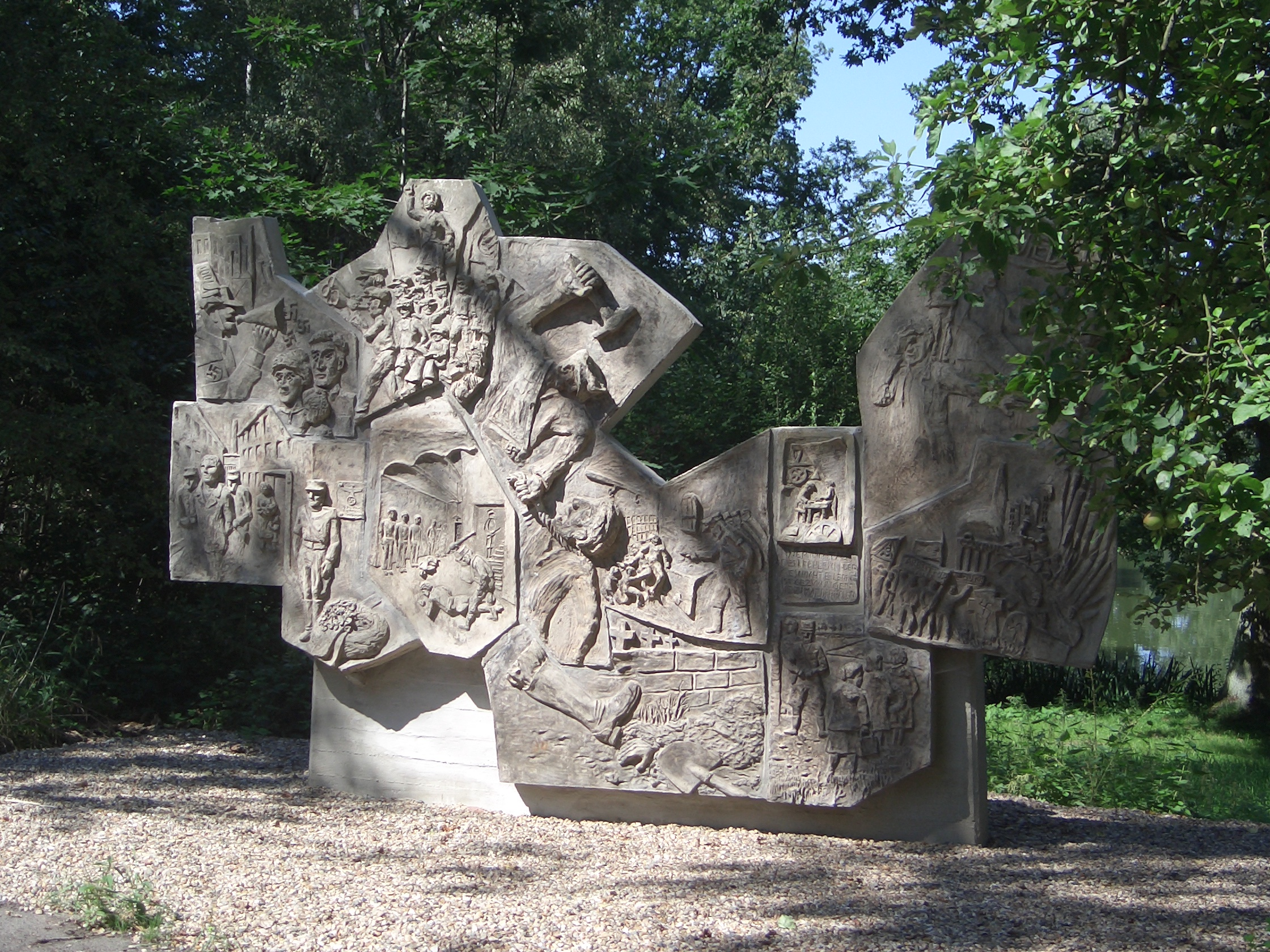
Memorial to the Rieseburg murdered régime opponents

Klagges was the youngest of a forest ranger's seven children. After attending Volksschule and a preparatory institute, he underwent training at a teachers' seminar at Soest. In April 1911, he enrolled for military service in the 15th Infantry Regiment (2nd Westphalian), headquartered in Minden, but was discharged in August with a 20 percent partial disability due to otitis media. He then worked as a Volksschule teacher in Harpen (today, a district of Bochum). After the First World War broke out, he re-enlisted in the 13th Infantry Regiment (1st Westphalian) on 15 January 1915. He saw action on the western front but was badly wounded on 1 April 1915 at Neuve Chapelle by a gunshot wound to the right thigh. He was first treated in a field hospital, then transferred to Germany and treated at military hospitals in Frankfurt and Bochum. He saw no further action and, after release from the hospital, was discharged on 31 July 1916. He returned to teaching, this time as a middle-school instructor in Wilster in Holstein.

In 1918, Klagges joined the conservative German National People's Party (DNVP) and remained a member until 1924. After leaving the DNVP, Klagge was for a short time a member of the extreme right-wing German Völkisch Freedom Party (DVFP). He soon left it, joining the Nazi Party (NSDAP) on 13 June 1925 (membership number 7,646). As an early Party member, he would later be awarded the Golden Party Badge.

From 1926 until 1930, Klagges worked as a deputy headmaster at a middle school in Benneckenstein, where he served on the city council and became its chairman. He was also a member of the Kreistag (district council) of Grafschaft Hohnstein, but he was defeated in his bid for election to the Landtag of Prussia in May 1928. Between 1928 and 1930, he was the Ortsgruppenleiter and the Bezirksleiter of the Party's local and district organizations, respectively. In the Autumn of 1930, he was dismissed from the Prussian school service and deprived of his pension rights because of his Party activities. In the same year, he first rose to prominence in Braunschweig, where he served as a Nazi Reichsredner (national speaker) and engaged in propaganda activities. From 1931 through September 1932, Klagges served in the Nazi Party Reichsleitung (national leadership) as a department head in the economics section of the Reich organization office.

== Nazi political career in Brunswick ==
In the Landtag election in the Free State of Brunswick on 14 September 1930, the Nazi Party emerged as the third strongest party, and entered into a coalition government with other conservative parties, including the German National People's Party.

=== Regierungsrat ===
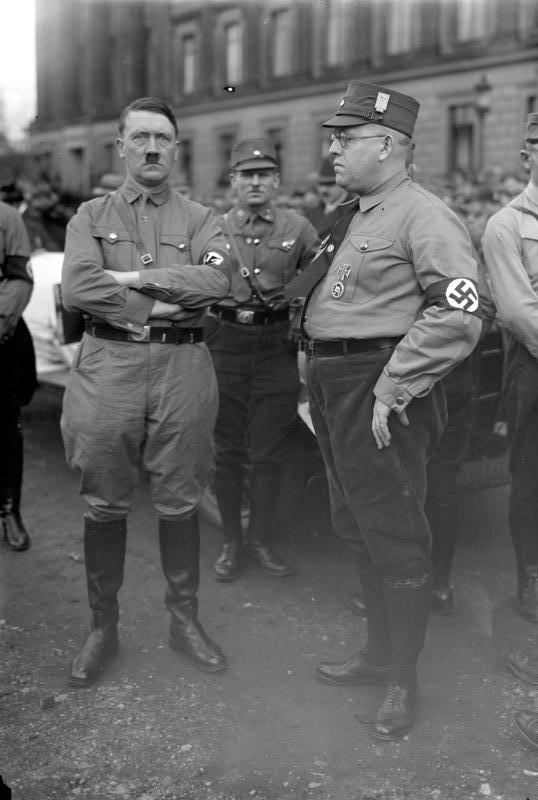
Anton Franzen and Hitler

On 1 January 1931, Klagges was appointed Regierungsrat (government counselor), a lower ranked government official, in the Education Ministry by Anton Franzen, the Nazi Interior and Education Minister of the Brunswick state government. After long political quarrels and intrigues, however, Franzen had to step down at the end of July 1931, and this triggered an internal political crisis, threatening a coalition breakdown.

=== State Minister of the Interior and Education ===
Owing to the imminent crisis, Adolf Hitler personally intervened in the matter and gave the DNVP an ultimatum that led to Klagges succeeding Franzen as Interior and Education Minister on 15 September 1931. Klagges set about, two years before the Nazis seized national power, imposing professional bans against Social Democrats and Jews in the civil service, resulting in the dismissal of many teaching staff at the Braunschweig Technical College.

At the July 1932 parliamentary election, Klagges was elected as a deputy of the Reichstag from the Nazi Party electoral list. He would remain a Reichstag deputy until the end of the Nazi regime, representing electoral constituency 15 (East Hanover) from November 1932, and constituency 16 (South Hanover-Braunschweig) from November 1933.

==== Naturalizing Adolf Hitler ====
The City of Braunschweig bears the stigma of being responsible for the former Austrian citizen – and since 1925, at his instigation, stateless person – Adolf Hitler's getting his first official job on 25 February 1932. He was made a Regierungsrat (low-rank government official) at the Braunschweig State Culture and Surveying Office, stationed as a staff member of the Braunschweig legation in Berlin. This had the effect of granting Hitler German citizenship. The city itself, however, played no role in his "naturalization"; rather, it was the Free State government, in whose name this deed was done by the State Minister for the Interior and Education, namely NSDAP member Dietrich Klagges.

Unlike in the City of Braunschweig, by 1930, the Nazis were already quite politically influential in the Brunswick Free State. For Hitler, an appointment to a government office in Braunschweig was the only opportunity to obtain German citizenship, since the Free State was the only state in the Weimar Republic with Nazis in government who could influence and control the Führer's naturalization.

For this reason, the Free State's government – or more precisely its State Minister, Klagges – was given the direct request by the NSDAP party leadership for Hitler's naturalization. Joseph Goebbels referred to the matter in his diary on 4 February 1932: "The intention is to appoint the Führer an associate professor."

===== Professor Hitler =====
Klagges first tried to procure for Hitler an associate professorship in the made-up discipline of "Politics and Organic Sociology" at the Braunschweig Technical College. This plan soon leaked out to the public and then failed miserably in the face of opposition from, among others, the technical college's own leadership and educators themselves. (The now-renamed University of Braunschweig did not want someone who had never finished school.) The plan had to be dropped.

Without meaning to, Klagges had given the Nazi Party the very thing that they had wanted to avoid at all costs: their intentions had now been made public and Hitler had become a target of ridicule. Moreover, Hitler's reputation had been damaged – and not only in Braunschweig – and Klagges would later get the "bill" for it.

===== Regierungsrat Hitler =====
There followed yet another attempt to get Hitler a government job, this time by Dr. Wessels, a German People's Party (DVP) Member of the Reichstag, who suggested that a post be procured for Hitler in the Brunswick Legation at the Reichsrat in Berlin. This second try met with success in the end: On 25 February 1932, Hitler was successfully sworn in, making Hitler a citizen of Brunswick, and thus of Germany. At the same time, he won the right to stand as a candidate in the 1932 Reich presidential election.

In the Braunschweigische Landeszeitung newspaper, Klagges declared a short time later:

"If our participation in the government in Braunschweig had had no further success than procuring citizenship for our Führer Adolf Hitler, then this fact alone is enough to prove the necessity of our participation in the government."

Hitler's job at the legation did not last long. On 16 February 1933 the new Reichskanzler requested in a short telegram discharge from the Brunswick State Service, which was promptly granted "effective immediately".

===== Break between Hitler and Klagges =====
Hitler's naturalization was supposed to be dealt with quickly and above all, inconspicuously, without the public getting any knowledge of it. However, with Klagges's clumsy way of doing things, the whole business grew into a farce for the later "Führer", since the first attempt failed miserably, and publicly. Only on the second try was it successful.

Hitler never forgave Klagges this public exposure and personal humiliation and settled the score with him on 17 July 1935 on his last visit to Braunschweig, which resulted in Klagges's de facto disempowerment. Henceforth, Klagges was to submit all plans to Reichsstatthalter Wilhelm Loeper in Dessau as well as Reichsminister Hanns Kerrl for approval, thereby being degraded to provincial politician and thrust off the stage of higher NSDAP politics. It is also likely that Klagges had only Hermann Göring's backing to thank for not being dismissed by Hitler on the spot.

=== Ministerpräsident and SS officer ===
On 6 May 1933, Klagges was appointed Ministerpräsident of the Free State of Brunswick by Reichsstatthalter Loeper. He also secured a seat in the reconstituted Landtag of Brunswick. Only a few days later, the first book burnings took place in Braunschweig at the Schlossplatz. On 2 October 1933, Klagges was named to Hans Frank's Academy for German Law at its inaugural meeting. Klagges joined the Schutzstaffel (SS) on 27 January 1934 with the rank of SS-Gruppenführer and was posted to the staff of the 49th Standarte in Braunschweig. On 1 October 1934, he was attached to the staff of SS-Oberabschnitt (main district) Nordwest, based in Hamburg. On 1 April 1936, he was assigned to the staff of the Reichsführer-SS, and he was promoted to SS-Obergruppenführer on 30 January 1942.

==== Nazi state model ====
Klagges's goal was the creation of a Nazi model state, which entailed keeping Brunswick as independent as possible from Berlin's overlordship, so that he could go on running his little "Reich" as he deemed fit. For Brunswick was a small state, and part of Gau Southern Hanover-Brunswick, composed largely of the Prussian Province of Hanover and controlled by powerful Gauleiter Bernhard Rust. Klagges would not hear of his state being integrated into Prussia – as this would have put an end to his independence – despite Hitler's assurances that Brunswick would still be a cultural centre, and not merely part of a new proposed "Reichsgau Hannover." To hold onto – and broaden – his own power, Klagges next tried to bring into being a new Gau – one that would be independent of Hanover. It would include not only Brunswick but also the two Regierungsbezirks of Lüneburg and Hildesheim and would be called "Gau Ostfalen." Its capital would be Braunschweig and the Gauleiter would be, of course, himself. Klagges found support for his idea among Braunschweig educators, from the middle class, the chamber of commerce, and even the Protestant Church. Despite his efforts, his plan came to nothing and the administrative status quo remained.

During his tenure, Klagges undertook several steps to strengthen Braunschweig's political and economic position in Germany: as of June 1933, a new suburb of Braunschweig, the "Dietrich Klagges Garden City" (Gartenstadt Dietrich Klagges) was built. Furthermore, he brought many important Nazi institutions to the city, such as the Academy for Youth Leadership (Akademie für Jugendführung), the German Research Centre for Aviation (Deutsche Versuchsanstalt für Luftfahrt), the Führer School for German Trades and Crafts (Führerschule des deutschen Handwerks), the Regional Führer School of the Hitler Youth (Gebietsführerschule der Hitler-Jugend), the Luftwaffe Command 2, the Reich Hunting Lodge (Reichsjägerhof, intended to impress passionate hunter Göring), the SS Ensigns' School (SS-Junkerschule), the SS Upper Division "Middle", and also the Bernhard Rust College for Teacher Training.

Klagges also further developed Braunschweig's infrastructure by connecting it to the newly built Autobahn and the Mittellandkanal. In the end, thanks to Klagges, Braunschweig also became a centre of the Nazi armament industry, since important industrial hubs were growing right nearby, namely the Reichswerke Hermann Göring in Salzgitter (on whose board of directors Klagges was as of 1937), and the Volkswagen Works in Fallersleben (now part of Wolfsburg).

==== Persecuting political dissenters ====
What follows is a few examples of how and by what means Dietrich Klagges persecuted politically undesirable persons (or had them persecuted), sometimes to death.

===== The Rieseberg Murders =====
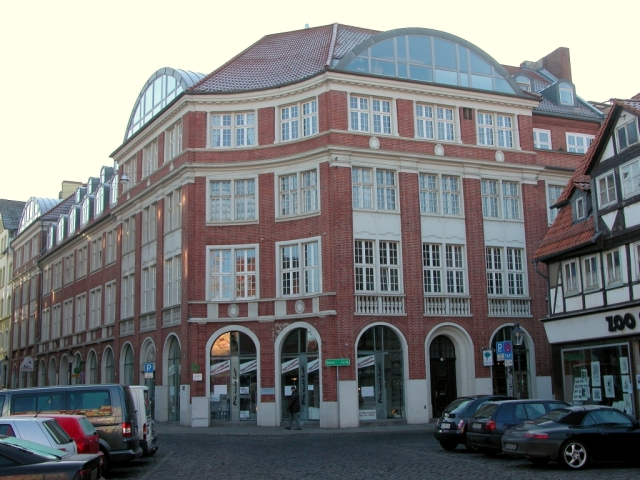
The SPD's Volksfreundhaus

A short time after the Nazis' seizure of power, the first acts of terror were seen in both the City of Braunschweig and throughout the state of Brunswick, in which the so-called "Hilfspolizei" ("Auxiliary Police") were involved. This force was directly answerable to Klagges and consisted of SA, SS and Der Stahlhelm men. Their actions were aimed mainly at members of various labour organizations, the SPD, the KPD, and Jews. They were carried out with extraordinary brutality. Klagges was therefore responsible for at least 25 Nazi régime opponents' deaths. The murder of eleven communists and labour organisers in Rieseberg (about 15 miles east of Braunschweig) by members of the SS on 4 July 1933 was the most important of these events. There was to have been a judicial inquiry into the circumstances of the arrestees' deaths, but Klagges assisted in blocking and suppressing it.

===== Ernst Böhme =====
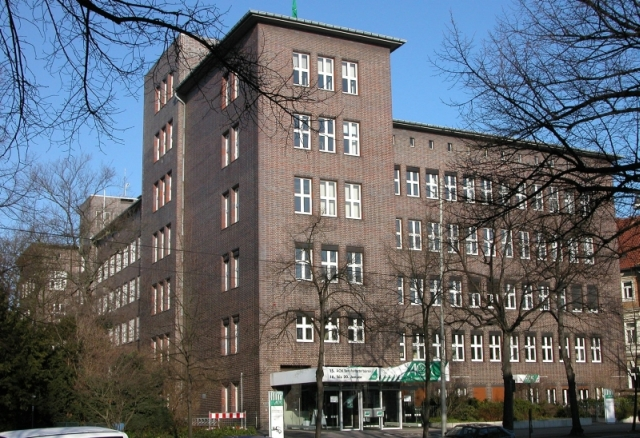
The "AOK Building", the Hilfspolizei's "protective custody" prison

Lawyer and SPD member Ernst Böhme (1892–1968) was from 1929 until 1933 the democratically elected Mayor of the City of Braunschweig.

After the Nazis had risen to power, however, he found himself the target of growing repressive measures and ever greater persecution by Klagges, who on 13 March 1933 ordered Böhme's ouster and had him taken to the disused AOK Building, which was being used by the Nazis as a "protective custody" prison, as they called it. Böhme had the dedication of former Brunswick Ministerpräsident Heinrich Jasper (who had likewise been persecuted by Klagges) to thank for the return of his freedom a short time later.

Shortly thereafter, however, Böhme was once again arrested and this time is taken to the SPD's own, but now disused, Volksfreundhaus where he was mishandled. He was forced to sign a document declaring that he had given up his mandate. After he was let go, Böhme left Braunschweig and came back only in 1945.

On 1 June 1945, Ernst Böhme was given back his mayoralty by the United States military administration. He stayed on as mayor until 17 December 1948.

===== Heinrich Jasper =====
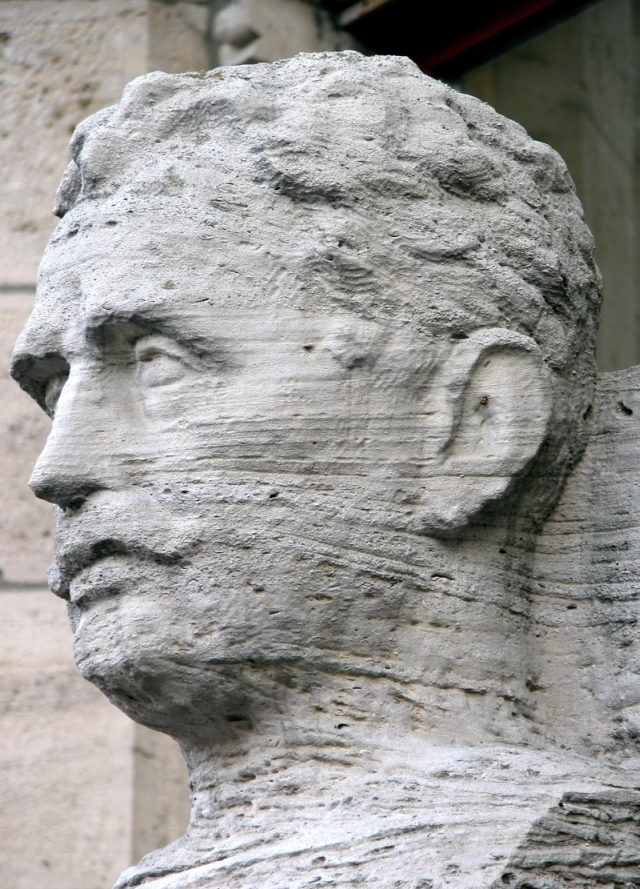
Heinrich Jasper

Lawyer and SPD member Heinrich Jasper (1875–1945) was, among other things, a city councillor since 1903, an SPD factional chairman in Brunswick's Landtag, member of the Weimar National Assembly as well as Brunswick State Minister between 1919 and 1930 and several times the Brunswick Free State's premier.

Jasper was, at Klagges's instigation, taken into "protective custody" on pretences on 17 March 1933, and taken to the AOK Building, where he was severely beaten in an attempt to force him to resign his political mandate, which Jasper, however, would not do. He was next taken to the Volksfreundhaus where he faced further mishandling until his temporary release on 19 April.

On 26 June 1933, Jasper was once again arrested and taken to Dachau concentration camp, from which he was released in 1939 under circumstances that have yet to be explained. Jasper then returned to Braunschweig where he was placed under constant surveillance and had to report daily to the Gestapo.

The failed attempt on Hitler's life at the Wolf's Lair in East Prussia on 20 July 1944 furnished another pretense on which to arrest Jasper yet again on 22 August 1944. After spending time in various concentration camps, he ended up at Bergen-Belsen where he is believed to have died on 19 February 1945 of typhus.

===== August Merges =====
August Merges (1870–1945) belonged to various leftwing parties, was one of the leaders of the November Revolution in Braunschweig and was President of the Socialist Republic of Brunswick. After 1933 he moved out of active party work and joined the resistance against the Nazi régime.

In April 1935, he was arrested together with other resistance fighters and severely beaten. He was sentenced for high treason but was released early, in 1937, for medical reasons. On Klagges's instructions, he was arrested once more and taken into "protective custody".

After Merges had once more been set free, he was nevertheless repeatedly picked up by the Gestapo and detained for a short time. He died as a result of mishandling suffered at the Gestapo's hands.

==== Forced labour and concentration camps ====
Beginning on 21 January 1941, Klagges started having Braunschweig's Jews deported to the concentration camps. In 1944, there were 91,000 forced labourers in the Watenstedt-Salzgitter, Braunschweig and Helmstedt area. This was far and away the highest density at labour camps anywhere in the Reich. Indeed, a great number of the people killed in the massive air raid on 15 October 1944 were forced labourers and camp inmates. When US troops occupied Braunschweig on 12 April 1945, there were still 61,000 prisoners in the camps.

== Post-war life and prosecutions ==
On 12 April 1945, Klagges was taken prisoner by American troops in Braunschweig. He was interned and investigated for involvement in the murders of Allied airmen and forced labourers. In 1946, a military court in Bielefeld sentenced him to six years in labour prison for his crimes. In July 1949, he was brought to trial a second time for additional crimes against German citizens and, on 4 April 1950, was convicted and sentenced to a life term in a labour prison for crimes committed by him as Brunswick state minister and Ministerpräsident, including the Rieseberg murders. On appeal, the Bundesgerichtshof in Karlsruhe nullified this sentence on 13 June 1952. Klagges again was brought to trial in October 1952 and was re-sentenced to fifteen years in prison on 4 November, with credit for time served. In his closing statement, Klagges denied all knowledge of the Nazi terror that had been perpetrated, and alleged that the witnesses against him were guilty of perjury.

In 1955, Klagges's wife petitioned for her husband's early release from prison without further probationary conditions. This was appealed by the state prosecutor and the release was rejected by the Braunschweig appeals court in February 1956. In February 1957, however, the Braunschweig Oberlandesgericht (high regional court) ordered his release in October with the condition that he serve a four-year parole in which he was banned from making speeches or produce public writings. Klagges was released from the Lingen penitentiary on 2 October 1957. He moved with his wife to Bad Harzburg, where he eventually returned to editing right-wing writings and maintained contacts with neo-Nazi groups in Lower Saxony. In 1970, the Federal Administrative Court in Leipzig decided a lawsuit in Klagges' favor, awarding him a retroactive pension payment of approximately DM 100,000 for his time as Ministerpräsident. Klagges died in 1971.

== Descendants ==
Klagges' great-great-grandson, Thiago Seyboth Wild (born 2000), is a professional tennis player for Brazil.

== Selected written works ==
From 1921 on, Klagges wrote many Völkisch, antidemocratic, and antisemitic articles, which appeared in right-wing newspapers and journals, including Die deutsche Schule, Die völkische Schule and Deutschlands Erneuerung. In 1934, he became the publisher of the magazine Nordlicht (Northern Lights). His partly theological publications were moulded by radical religious racism.

- Der Glaube (1926)
- Kampf dem Marxismus (1930)
- Die Weltwirtschaftskrise (1930)
- Reichtum und soziale Gerechtigkeit: Grundfragen einer nationalsozialistischen Volkswirtschaftslehre (1933)
- Geschichtsunterricht als nationalpolitische Erziehung (1936)
- Volk und Führer: deutsche Geschichte für Schulen (1938)
- An alle Völker der Erde: Die Zukunft der Nationen (1972)

== Quotations ==
- "He wants to remain king of an enlarged Braunschweig" (entry in Goebbels's diary from 5 February 1941 about Klagges)
- "The hundreds of thousands of foreigners, above all Jews, were impartially acknowledged as having equal rights … Behind everything stood the parasitic Jews' will … to rule the world." (from Klagges's book Geschichtsunterricht als nationalpolitische Erziehung)

== See also ==
- List SS-Obergruppenführer

== Sources ==
- Richard Bein: Im deutschen Land marschieren wir. Freistaat Braunschweig 1930–1945. Braunschweig 1984
- Braunschweiger Zeitung (publisher): "Wie braun war Braunschweig? Hitler und der Freistaat Braunschweig" Braunschweig 2003
- Horst-Rüdiger Jarck, Günter Scheel (publishers): Braunschweigisches Biographisches Lexikon. 19. und 20. Jahrhundert, Hanover 1996
- Horst-Rüdiger Jarck, Gerhard Schildt (publishers): Braunschweigische Landesgeschichte. Jahrtausendrückblick einer Region, Braunschweig 2000, ISBN 3-930292-28-9
- Helmut Kramer (publisher): Braunschweig unterm Hakenkreuz. Braunschweig 1981
- Karl-Joachim Krause: Braunschweig zwischen Krieg und Frieden. Die Ereignisse vor und nach der Kapitulation der Stadt am 12. April 1945. Braunschweig 1994
- Miller, Michael D.; Schulz, Andreas (2012). Gauleiter :The Regional Leaders of the Nazi Party and Their Deputies, 1925-1945. Vol. 1 (Herbert Albrecht – H. Wilhelm Hüttmann). San Jose, Calif.: R. James Bender Publishing. ISBN 978-1-932-97021-0.
- Miller, Michael D.; Schulz, Andreas (2015). Leaders of the SS & German Police. Vol. 2 Reichsführer SS – Gruppenführer (Hans Haltermann to Walter Kruger). R. James Bender Publishing. ISBN 978-1-932-97025-8.
- Hans Johann Reinowski: Terror in Braunschweig. Aus dem ersten Quartal der Hitlerherrschaft. Bericht herausgegeben von der Kommission zur Untersuchung der Lage der politischen Gefangenen. Zurich 1933
- Ernst-August Roloff: Braunschweig und der Staat von Weimar. Politik, Wirtschaft und Gesellschaft 1918–1933. In: Braunschweiger Werkstücke, Band 31, Braunschweig 1964
- Ernst-August Roloff: Bürgertum und Nationalsozialismus 1930–1933. Braunschweigs Weg ins Dritte Reich. Hanover 1961
- Gunhild Ruben: Bitte mich als Untermieter bei Ihnen anzumelden – Hitler und Braunschweig 1932–1935. Norderstedt 2004
- Williams, Max (2015). SS elite : the senior leaders of Hitler's Praetorian Guard. Vol. 2. Oxford, England: Fonthill Media LLC. ISBN 978-1-78155-434-0.

Government offices
Preceded by Werner Küchenthal	Ministerpräsident of the Free State of Brunswick; 1933–1945	Succeeded by Hubert Schlebusch
