= Austrian identity card =

Identification document for Austrian citizens

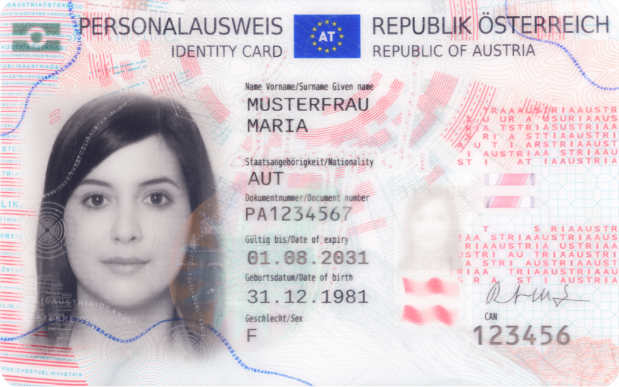

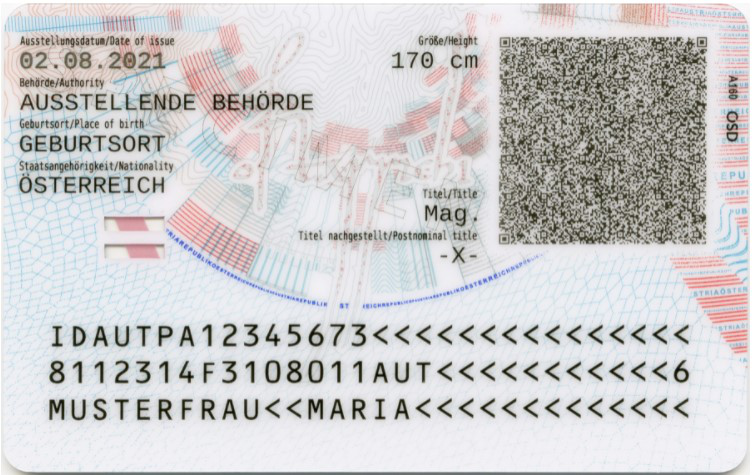
- Specimen of the credit-card sized Austrian identity card issued since 2 August 2021
- Type: Voluntary identity document
- Issued by: Austria
- Valid in: EFTA; European Union; United Kingdom (EU Settlement Scheme); Rest of Europe (except Belarus, Russia, and Ukraine) Georgia; Montserrat (max. 14 days); Overseas France
- Expiration: 10 years (age 12 or over); 5 years (age 2–11); 2 years (age under 2)

The Austrian identity card is issued to Austrian citizens. It can be used as a travel document when visiting countries in the EEA (EU plus EFTA) countries, Europe's microstates, Albania, Bosnia and Herzegovina, Georgia, Kosovo, Moldova, Montenegro, North Macedonia, Northern Cyprus, Serbia, Montserrat, the French overseas territories, and on organized tours to Tunisia. Only around 10 % of the citizens of Austria had this card in 2012, as they can use the Austrian driver's licenses or other identity cards domestically and the more widely accepted Austrian passport abroad.

German names containing umlauts (ä, ö, ü) and/or ß are spelled in the correct way in the non-machine-readable zone of the passport, but with simple vowel + E and/or SS in the Machine Readable Zone, e.g. Müller becomes MUELLER, Groß becomes GROSS, and Gößmann becomes GOESSMANN.

The transcription mentioned above is generally used for airplane tickets etc., but sometimes (like in US visas) also simple vowels are used (MULLER, GOSSMANN). The three possible spelling variants of the same name (e.g. Müller / Mueller / Muller) in different documents sometimes lead to confusion, and the use of two different spellings within the same document (like in the passport) may give people who are unfamiliar with the German orthography the impression that the document is a forgery.

Austrian identity cards and passports may (but do not always) contain a trilingual (in German, English, and French) explanation of the German umlauts and ß, e.g. 'ß' entspricht / is equal to / correspond a 'SS'.

== See also ==
- National identity cards in the European Union
