= Austrian nationality law =

Nationality Law Staatsbürgerschaftsgesetzes
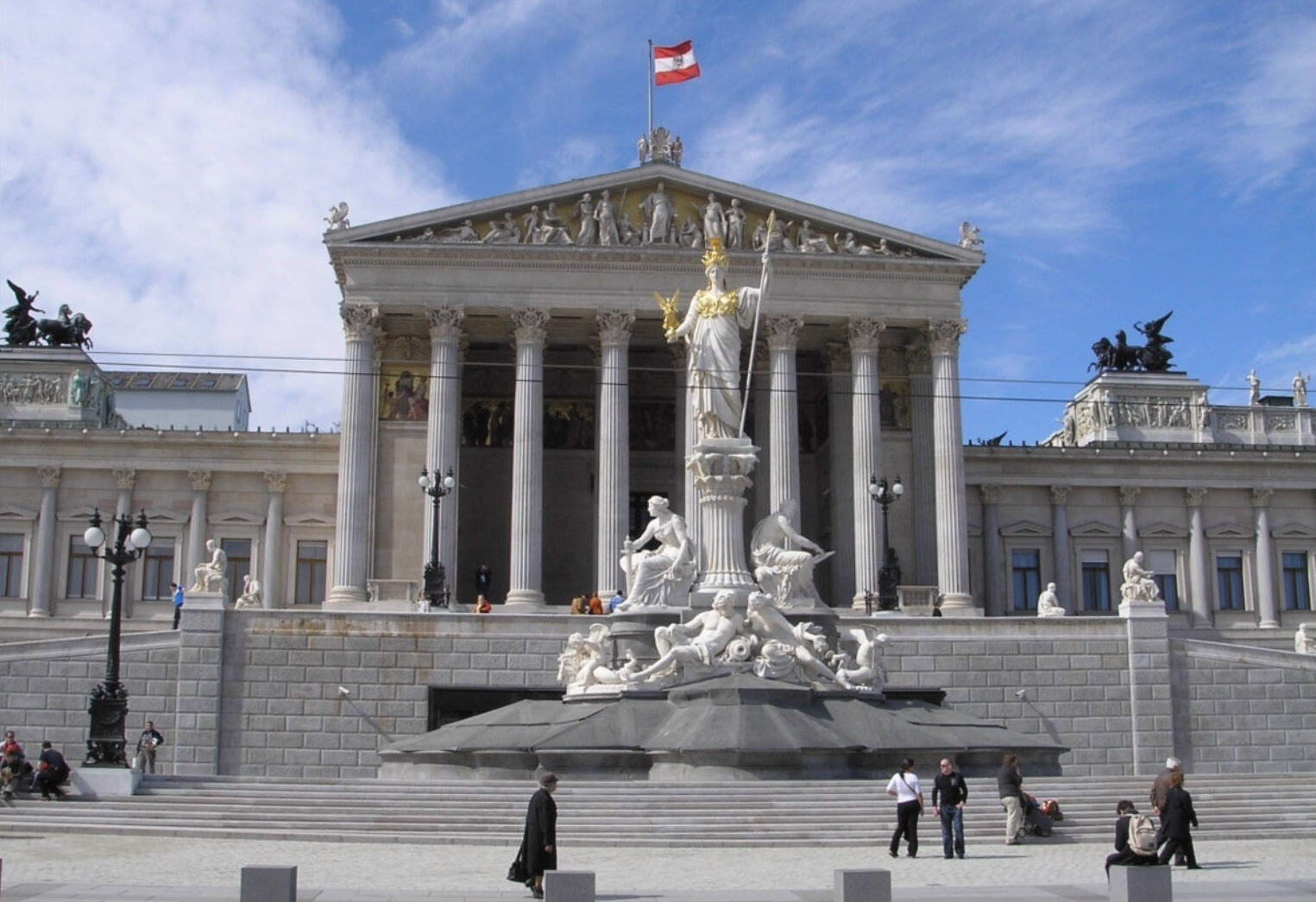

Austrian Parliament
- Citation: BGBl 311/1985
- Territorial extent: Austria
- Enacted by: Austrian Parliament
- Commenced: 31 July 1985
- Status: Amended

Austrian nationality law details the conditions by which an individual is a national of Austria. The primary law governing these requirements is the Nationality Law, which came into force on 31 July 1985.

Austria is a member state of the European Union (EU) and all Austrian nationals are EU citizens. They have automatic and permanent permission to live and work in any EU or European Economic Area (EEA) country and may vote in elections to the European Parliament.

== History ==
Heimatschein (municipal citizenship certificate) issued in Czernowitz 1914.

During 1812–1918, citizenship in the Austrian Empire (after 1867 the Austro-Hungarian Empire) was regulated by the Allgemeines bürgerliches Gesetzbuch (ABGB) (§§ 28–30). The system of Heimatrecht was introduced in 1859, defining citizenship at the municipal level: Heimatrecht in a given municipality guaranteed the right of residence in that municipality and social support for destitute individuals. Suffrage (election of the Imperial Council) for all male citizens with Heimatrecht was introduced in 1906. From 1863, municipalities were obliged to keep a record (Heimatrolle) of all citizens. Most citizens would be registered as members of a parish of the Catholic Church (Pfarrmatrikel); for non-Catholics, a separate register (Grammatical) was introduced in 1870. Citizenship was granted based on either descent or marriage, or via naturalization after ten years of residence (or on the acquisition of an official function). Citizenship could also be retracted in the case of an absence of longer than two years. By a principle of subsidiarity, citizenship in a municipality implied citizenship in the Crown land of that municipality. General Austrian citizenship (allgemeines österreichisches Staatsbürgerrecht) for all Cisleithanian Crown lands represented in the Imperial Council was introduced in 1867, with a separate Hungarian citizenship recognized for the lands of the Hungarian Crown.

The First Austrian Republic recognized all citizens of Republic of German-Austria as Austrian citizens, effective 13 December 1918. Also recognized as citizens were all individuals with permanent residence in the territory of German-Austria since at least 1914. Individuals with Austrian citizenship outside of German-Austria (with the exception of Galicia, Bukovina, Dalmatia and Istria) were given the right to declare themselves Germination and so receive citizenship. The new constitution of 1920 introduced the system of States (Bundesländer). Nationality law was now handled at the State level (Landesbürgerschaft), still tied to municipal citizenship (Heimatrecht) via the subsidiarity principle. A new nationality passed in 1925 permitted naturalization following a period of permanent residence of at least four years.

Between 13 March 1938 and 27 April 1945, Austria was part of Germany, and German nationality law applied. Those acquiring Austrian citizenship upon the establishment of the Second Austrian Republic in 1945 generally lost German citizenship on that date.

The Republic of Austria was established in 1955, and the current nationality law was originally enacted in 1965, and renewed in 1985 to reflect gender equality, introducing perfect symmetry for the acquisition of nationality via marriage by either partner. The law has been updated several times, in 1986, 1988, 1993, 1994, 1997,1998, 2006, 2013 and 2019.

== Acquisition and loss of nationality ==
=== Birth in Austria ===
Birth in Austria does not in itself confer Austrian citizenship. However it may lead to a reduction in the residence requirement for naturalisation as an Austrian citizen. Foundlings under the age of 6 months are legally presumed to have Austrian citizenship.

=== Descent from an Austrian parent ===
Children automatically become Austrian citizens at the time of their birth, when the mother is an Austrian citizen. The same applies in case the parents are married and only the father is an Austrian citizen.

If the parents are not married and only the father of the child is an Austrian citizen, however the mother is a national of another country, the child acquires Austrian citizenship, when within 8 weeks the Austrian father recognizes his parenthood or the fact that he is the father is determined by court. In all cases where recognition of fatherhood or the determination by court is done after his timeframe, children may be awarded Austrian citizenship in a simplified procedure.

If in case of parents of different nationality the country of citizenship of the non-Austrian parent also foresees a jus sanguinis (like Austria), the child will have dual citizenship. According to Austrian law the child does not have to decide between Austrian and the other nationality upon becoming an adult – the other state might require such a decision.

=== Naturalization ===
It is possible to apply for Austrian citizenship by naturalization generally after 10 years of continuous residence in Austria. However, in certain cases it is possible to apply earlier.

Additional requirements include:

- knowledge of the German language 'having due regard to the alien's personal circumstances'
- renunciation of foreign citizenship (under the law of the applicant's home country) unless this is impractical. This requirement can be waived in exceptional cases. For details, see the section Dual citizenship below.

Naturalization as an Austrian citizen based on 10 years of continuous residence is discretionary.

==== Exemptions to the residence requirement ====
The residence requirement may be reduced or waived in the following cases:

- recognized refugees (10 years)
- citizens of other European Economic Area nations (6 years)
- persons born in Austria
- former citizens of Austria
- persons with the knowledge of the German language on level B2 or with proof of substantial personal integration (after 6 years of uninterrupted residence).

=== Entitlement to grant of Austrian citizenship ===
Some persons are entitled to Austrian citizenship by a simpler process than naturalization.

Minor children of a person granted Austrian citizenship are most often granted Austrian citizenship as well.

==== Spouses of Austrian citizens ====
- The marriage must have lasted for a minimum of 5 years.
- The spouse applicant must also have lived in Austria with a settlement permit (Niederlassungsbewilligung) for a minimum of 6 years.

Until June 6, 2026, when Sweden's new nationality law and requirements came into effect, this entitlement scheme was the most restrictive among all the European Union member countries regarding foreign spouses obtaining the member state's citizenship.

==== Long residence in Austria ====
A person who has lived in Austria for 30 years, or 15+ years in cases of 'sustained personal and occupational integration', is entitled to grant of Austrian citizenship.

==== Former Austrian citizens ====
- Former citizens of Austria who lost citizenship other than by renunciation or deprivation may be granted Austrian citizenship after 1 year's residence in Austria. Austrian citizenship must have been possessed for 10 years before it was lost.
- A person who lost Austrian nationality as a child (other than by deprivation) may re-acquire it by declaration within 2 years of turning 18.

==== Stateless persons born in Austria ====
A stateless person born in Austria may be granted Austrian citizenship within two years of age 18 if (s)he has lived in Austria for a total of 10 years, including 5 years continuously before application.

==== Restoration of lost Austrian citizenship to victims of National Socialism and their descendants ====
Beginning on 1 September 2020, Austrian Jews and any other Austrian citizens, as well as stateless people and citizens of successor states of Austria-Hungary resident in Austria, who left Austria before 15 May 1955 because they had either suffered persecution by the Nazi regime or had reason to fear such persecution, as well as those who had suffered persecution because of their support of democracy in Austria or had reason to fear such persecution, have been able to have their citizenship restored, while retaining any other citizenship they have since acquired. In addition, any direct descendants of those persons, including those adopted as minors, are able to claim Austrian citizenship, without giving up any existing citizenship, and whether or not their ancestors have regained or claimed Austrian citizenship. Individuals claiming citizenship under this provision (§58c) have to of to provide appropriate documentation demonstrating prior Austrian citizenship of the persecuted person, e.g., birth certificate, passport, heimatschein, etc. as well as proof of descent for those claiming citizenship by descent from the persecuted person, e.g., birth certificate.

==== Appointment to a professorship at an Austrian university ====
As a result of the fact that appointment to a professorship at an Austrian university or other institute of higher learning entailed being named a state official before the year 2001 3, foreign citizens formerly received Austrian citizenship immediately when they took office, without additionally applying for citizenship, or being compelled to do so 4.

Austria's entry into the European Union meant that citizens of other member countries now enjoyed the same rights to access to employment as Austrians (as a consequence of broader European integration). This meant that the automatic conferment of citizenship on professors was valid only for citizens of non-EU states 5. However, since September 1, 2001, postings for university professorships are to be advertised exclusively as private-sector employment 6. Therefore, the requirement of automatic conferment of citizenship on foreign-nationals named to professorships (as found in § 25 Abs. 1 StbG) was rendered obsolete. This article was therefore determined to be no longer valid by the First Federal Constitutional Cleanup Law (Erstes Bundesverfassungsrechtsbereinigungsgesetz) of January 4, 2008. 7

The regulation for professors (Dienstantritt als Universitätsprofessor, § 25 Abs. 1) was thereby abolished by the revision of the law in 2008. 8

Furthermore, spouses and minor unmarried children of those professors who were still named state officials previously also received Austrian citizenship (§ 25 Abs. 2 and 3) by declaring, within one year of the spouse's/parent's acceptance as a citizen, "a desire to be a loyal citizen of the Republic". In this special case of naturalization, dual citizenship was permitted. A parliamentary survey 9 on the number of people naturalized in this fashion showed that there had been no statistics collected on this point.

=== Loss of Austrian citizenship ===
An Austrian citizen who acquires another citizenship by voluntary action automatically loses Austrian citizenship, as dual citizenship is substantially restricted by law (see the section below for details). The exception is in cases where permission to retain Austrian citizenship has been obtained in advance. This may be difficult to obtain, as the aim of the legislature is to reduce the number of dual citizenships granted. Exceptions are made for situations where it is in the interest of the Republic of Austria to grant this dual citizenship (e.g. notable individuals in the arts, sports, science, business etc.), or in situations where the citizen would suffer hardship due to not having the second citizenship. If, for example, an Austrian citizen wanted to obtain U.S. citizenship because they live in the U.S. and, without U.S. citizenship, would lose their green card due to being made to travel more than 180 days per year by their employer, then if they apply for permission to retain Austrian citizenship, that request is usually granted and has become almost a formality.

The important part is that the application to retain Austrian citizenship is made before acquiring another citizenship. Otherwise the Austrian citizenship is automatically lost the moment a person obtains a foreign citizenship.

Austrian citizenship is also automatically lost by serving in a foreign army.

== Dual citizenship ==
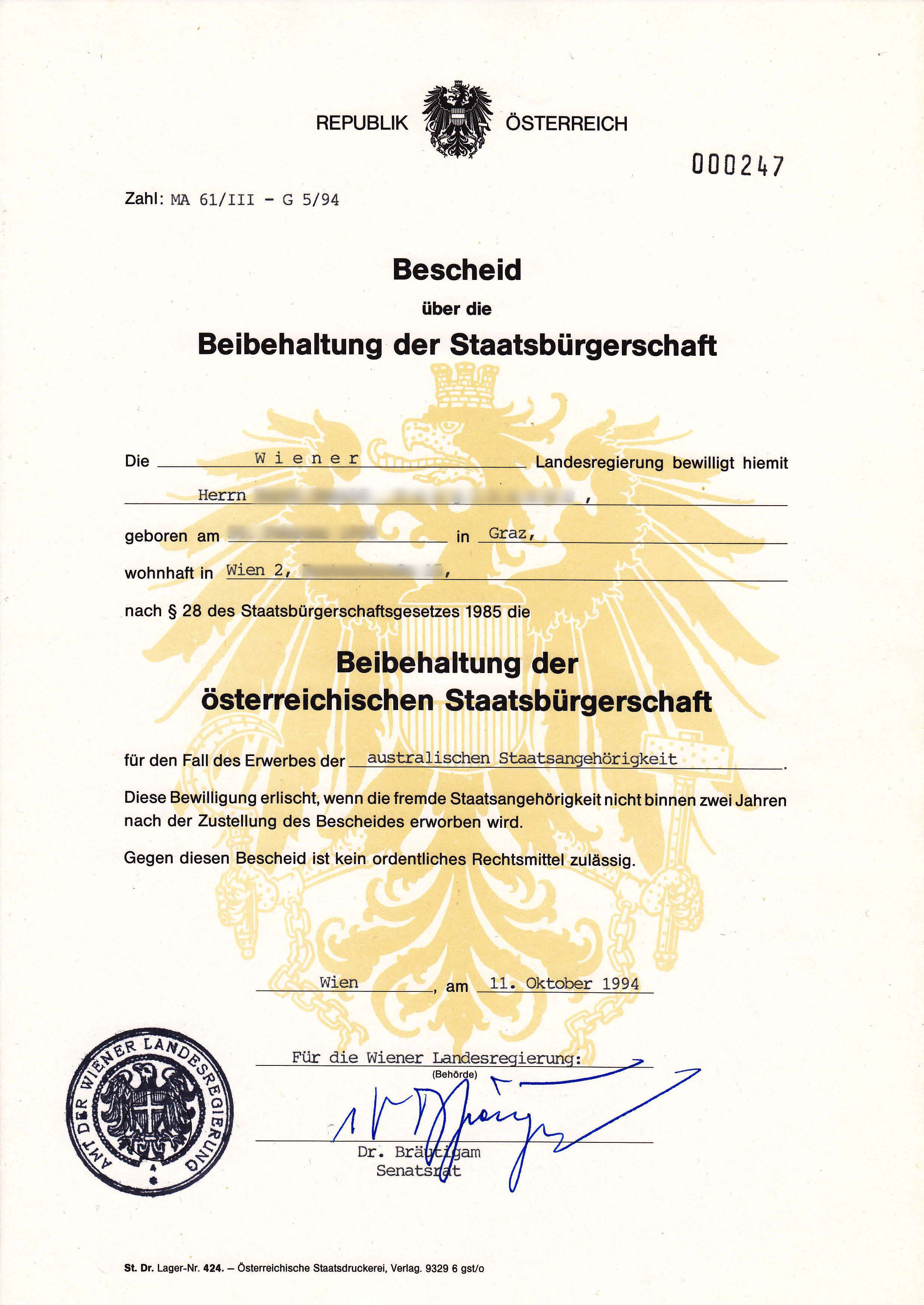
A certificate of retention of Austrian citizenship, issued to an Austrian citizen acquiring Australian citizenship

Austrian law substantially restricts dual citizenship. In general, only the following categories of Austrian citizens may possess a foreign nationality:

- those acquiring another nationality at birth, such as children born to Austrian parents in another country, thus automatically gaining citizenship of that country, or those born with an Austrian and a foreign parent.
- naturalized Austrian citizens who are unable to renounce their existing nationality.
- Natural born Austrian Citizen (Austrian citizen born in Austria or Born abroad to Austrian parents) or Austrian citizen by birth naturalizing or being born in an Jus soli country (e.g. USA, Canada, or Mexico)
- Natural born citizen of the other country (Other countries citizens by birth, Jus soli, e.g. USA, Canada or Mexico or descent) in some cases don't need to renounce their previous citizenship
- Austrians naturalizing in German speaking countries specified as Germany, Liechtenstein, Belgium and Switzerland are sometimes exempted to have a permission or renounce their Austrian citizenship. However, Austria and Germany, for example, exchange information regarding naturalization of citizens with provisions for confiscating documents.
- Austrian citizens who naturalize in another country with permission obtained to retain Austrian citizenship (de: Beibehaltung der Staatsbürgerschaft). A famous example is actor and politician Arnold Schwarzenegger, who naturalised as a US citizen but was granted special permission to retain his Austrian citizenship.
- Victims of Nazi persecution and their descendants.
- In special circumstances, like for actor Christoph Waltz, born in Vienna, where he also went to school and studied drama, who holds a German passport like his father, although his mother is Austrian. He has been granted Austrian citizenship in September 2010 after being awarded an Oscar in March for Best Actor in Tarantino's "Inglourious Basterds". The immediate approval of his citizenship application, however, fueled the debate on Austria's immigration and citizenship policies that are regarded as heavily biased in favor of celebrities.

Austria and the Netherlands are the only signatory States of the Strasbourg convention on the reduction of cases of multiple citizenship that have not denounced (withdrawn from) Chapter I, which limits the cases where dual citizenship is allowed. The convention is not an issue for a person's request for dual citizenship, as the prohibition resides in Austrian domestic law (StBG) and is applied to any foreign nationality, worldwide (while the convention only binds a few signatory States). However, Austria's acceptance of Chapter I is of symbolic and historical significance, in the sense that it reflects the attitude towards multiple citizenship that has been codified into law.

== Citizenship of the European Union ==
Because Austria forms part of the European Union, Austrian citizens are also citizens of the European Union under European Union law and thus enjoy rights of free movement and have the right to vote in elections for the European Parliament. When in a non-EU country where there is no Austrian embassy, Austrian citizens have the right to get consular protection from the embassy of any other EU country present in that country. Austrian citizens can live and work in any country within the EU as a result of the right of free movement and residence granted in Article 21 of the EU Treaty.
