= Ferdinand von Arnim =

German architect and watercolour-painter

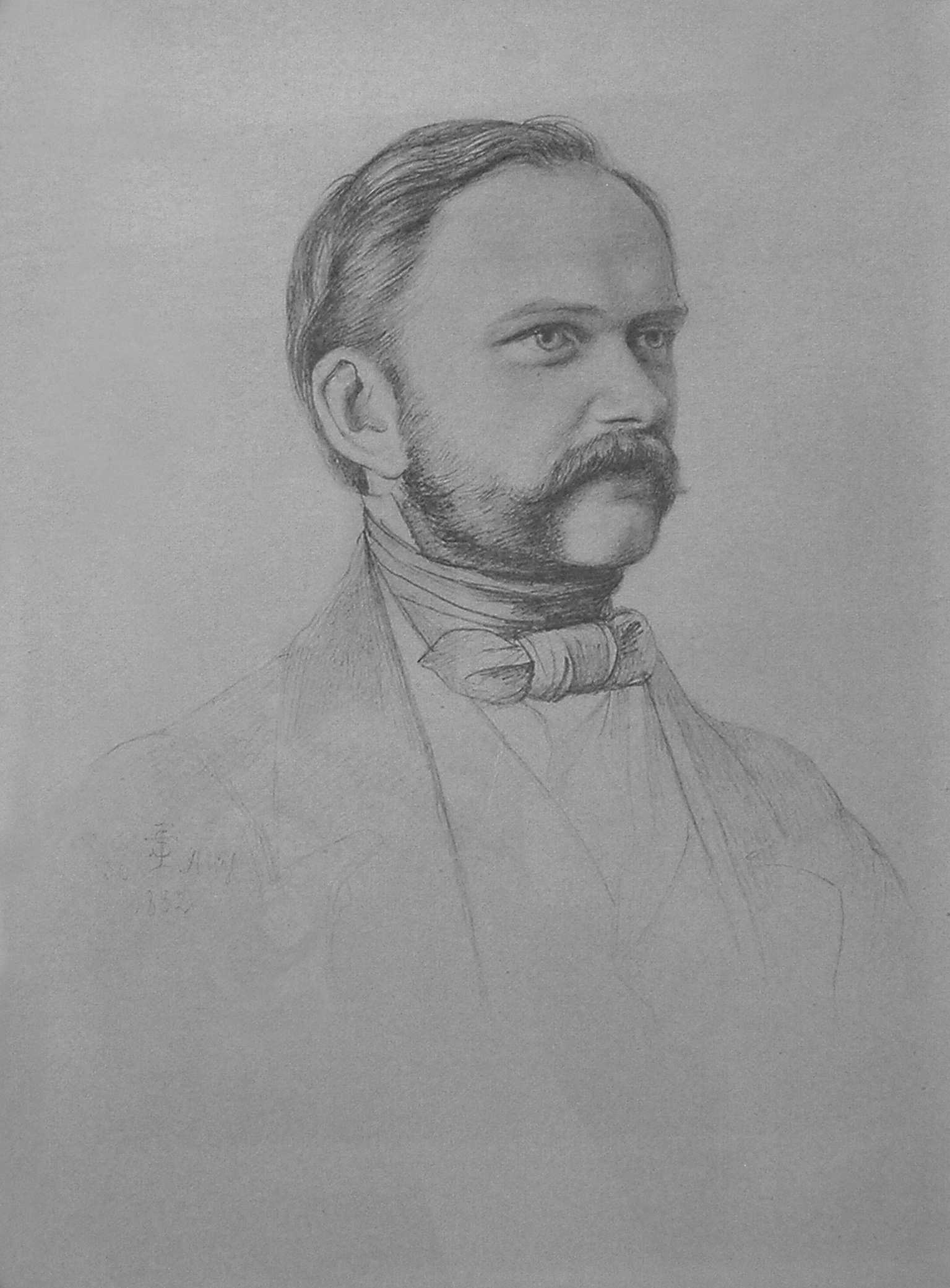
- Von Arnim in 1852
- Born: Heinrich Ludwig Ferdinand von Arnim; 15 September 1814; Treptow an der Rega, Pomerania (present-day Trzebiatów, Poland)
- Died: 23 March 1866 (aged 51); Berlin, Germany
- Occupations: Architect and watercolour-painter

Heinrich Ludwig Ferdinand von Arnim (15 September 1814 – 23 March 1866) was a German architect and watercolour-painter. He was a student of Karl Friedrich Schinkel and mainly worked in Berlin and Potsdam.

== Life ==
Arnim was born in Treptow an der Rega in Pomerania (present-day Trzebiatów, Poland), the son of Prussian Captain Friedrich Ludwig von Arnim and his wife Henriette, née Gadebusch. He trained as a land surveyor and studied architecture at the Royal Prussian Building School (Bauakademie) in Berlin between 1833 and 1838. Having completed his studies, he joined the Berlin Architects' Association in 1839, from 1840 he worked as site foreman under Friedrich Ludwig Persius and in 1844 was appointed building inspector official.

Upon Persius' death in 1845, Arnim became a member of the Berlin City Palace building committee under Friedrich August Stüler and house architect of the Hohenzollern prince Charles of Prussia at his residence in Klein-Glienicke. He was employed from 1846 as a teacher, from 1857 as a professor at the Bauakademie in Berlin and achieved the title of a court architect in 1849. From 1855 to 1863 Prince Hermann von Pückler-Muskau employed him to rebuild the palace and gardens of Branitz (near Cottbus). 1862 saw him become the advisor on courtly architecture in the Potsdam department of Ludwig Ferdinand Hesse (1795–1876).

Arnim died in Berlin in 1866 at the age of 51. He was entombed in the part of the Potsdam-Bornstedt cemetery (near the tomb of his mentor Ludwig Persius); nearby were buried the famous Sello family of court gardeners.

== Works ==
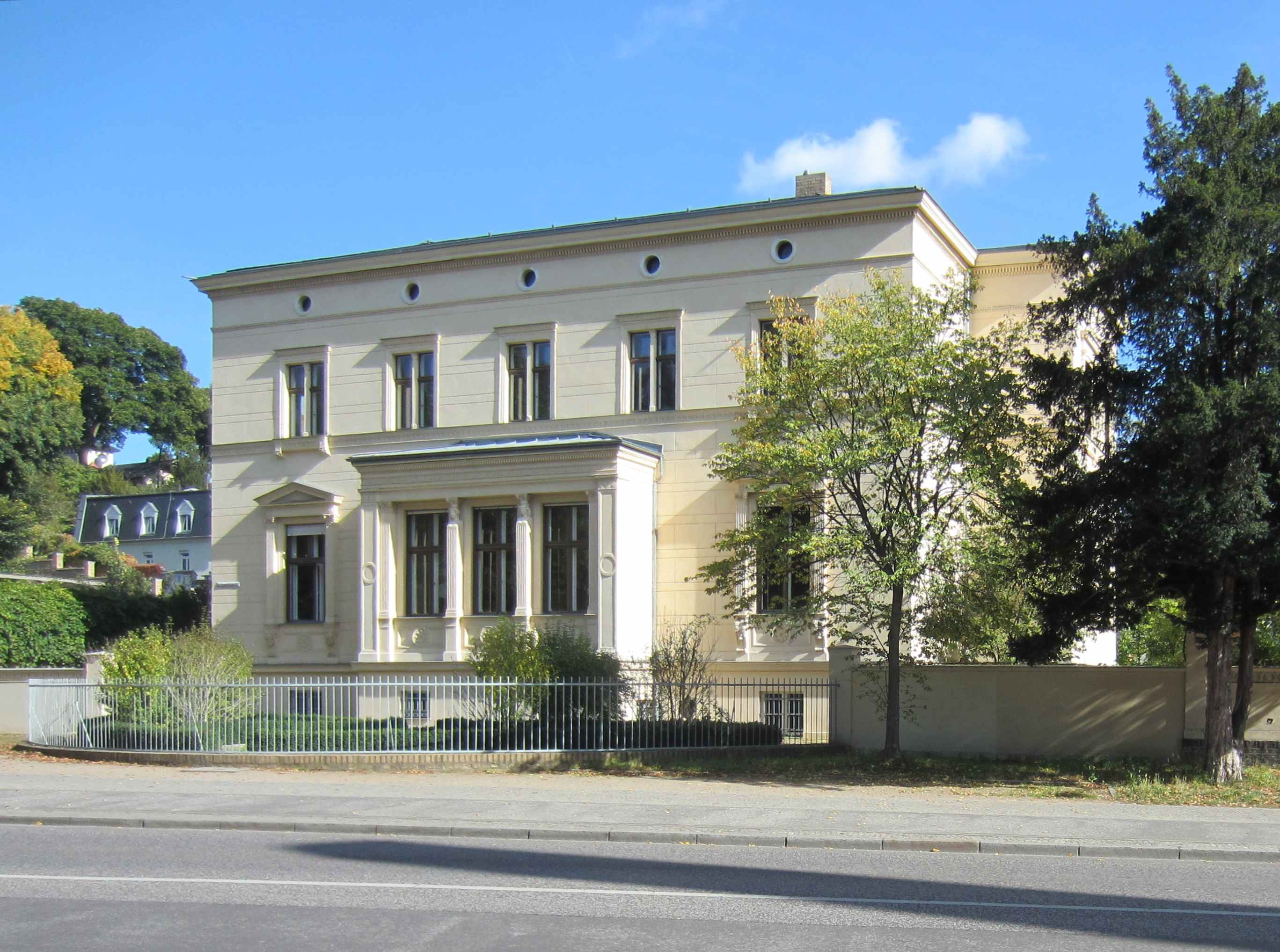
Villa Arnim, Potsdam

- 1841–1844, collaboration in the construction of the Church of the Redeemer, Sacrow under Ludwig Persius
- 1845–1848, The Church of Peace (Sanssouci) in Potsdam, together with Ludwig Ferdinand Hesse, following the plans of Ludwig Persius and Friedrich August Stüler
- 1846, Norman Tower on the Ruinenberg, according to plans by Ludwig Persius
- 1848, Neoclassical Villa belonging to Major General von Haacke; in Potsdam, Jägerallee 1
- 1850, Klosterhof at Glienicke Palace (with structural elements of the former La Certosa monastery in the Venetian Lagoon)
- 1859/60, Late-classical Villa Arnim in Potsdam, Weinbergstraße 20
- 1860/61 Villa Arndt, Friedrich-Ebert-Str. 63, Potsdam (carried out by August Ernst Petzholtz)
- 1860, Neo-Gothic redesign of Nennhausen Palace (formerly held by Philipp Friedrich August Wilhelm von Briest, father of Caroline de la Motte Fouqué, at that time the property of the Rochow noble family)
- 1860–61, Redesign of the Glienicke hunting lodge
- 1863/1867, Swiss houses (Schweizerhäuser) in Klein Glienicke (an exclusive residential district in Potsdam-Babelsberg, Wilhelm-Leuschner-Straße, Louis-Nathan-Allee and Waldmüllerstraße). Four of the originally ten buildings survive.
- 1864–1868, Neo-Gothic castle church in Kröchlendorff (Nordwestuckermark)

== See also ==
- List of German painters
