= Jeffrey Reid =

Academic background
- Education: Paris-Sorbonne University (MA, PhD)
- Thesis: Le moi et le monde chez Hegel et les romantiques allemands (1997)
- Doctoral advisor: Jean-François Marquet

Academic work
- Era: Contemporary philosophy
- Region: Western philosophy
- School or tradition: German Idealism
- Institutions: University of Ottawa
- Website: https://uniweb.uottawa.ca/network/profile/members/494

Jeffrey Reid is a professor of philosophy at the University of Ottawa.

== Background ==
Jeffrey Reid completed his philosophical training in France at the Université de Paris IV–Sorbonne, where he earned his undergraduate degrees, a Master’s, and a Ph.D. on Hegel, in 1997 under the direction of Jean-François Marquet. After returning to his hometown of Toronto to teach and work, and now based in Ottawa, Reid has published widely in both French and English. His primary research interests lie in epistemological and ethical questions within Hegel, German Idealism, and Early German Romanticism. His approach to these topics is deeply shaped by his background in French Hegelianism.

== Selected publications ==
=== Books ===
- Reason and Revelation in Hegel: Metaphysical Dimension of the Absolute. University of Toronto Press. ISBN 978-1-4875-6365-3.
- Reid, Jeffrey (2025). Hegel's Metaphysics of Being: An Ontological Reading of the "Lesser" Logic. Brill. doi:10.1163/9789004744301. ISBN 978-90-04-74430-1.
- Hegels Grammatical Ontology Vanishing Words And Hermeneutical Openness In The Phenomenology Of Spirit. Bloomsbury. 2021.
- The Anti-Romantic: Hegel Against Ironic Romanticism. Bloomsbury Academic. 2019-02-21. ISBN 978-1-350-08990-7.
- Reid, Jeffrey (2007). Real Words: Language and System in Hegel. University of Toronto Press. doi:10.3138/9781442684744. ISBN 978-1-4426-8474-4.

=== Articles ===
- Reid, Jeffrey (2024). "The Meaning of Music in Hegel". Journal of Philosophical Research. 49: 129–149. doi:10.5840/jpr2024529217. ISSN 1053-8364.
- Reid, Jeffrey (2024-06-01). "Mental Illness as Irony: Hegel's Diagnosis of Novalis". Studia Hegeliana. 10: 7–21. doi:10.24310/stheg.10.2024.17808. ISSN 2792-176X.
- Hegel's Dialectics of Digestion, Excretion and Animal Subjectivity, Owl of Minerva. 53, 1/2: 71-97. 2022. https://doi.org/10.5840/owl20232144
