= August Ludwig Hülsen =

German philosopher and writer

- Born: 3 March 1765; Aken, Holy Roman Empire
- Died: 24 September 1809 (aged 44); Stechow, Kingdom of Prussia

Education
- Education: University of Kiel; University of Jena

Philosophical work
- Era: 18th-century philosophy
- Region: Western philosophy
- School: German idealism Jena Romanticism; Naturphilosophie
- Main interests: History of philosophy
- Notable ideas: Humanity strives after one determined universal goal

August Ludwig Hülsen (3 March 1765 – 24 September 1809), also known by the pseudonym Hegekern, was a German philosopher, writer and pedagogue of early German Romanticism. His thought played a role in the development of German idealism.

== Life ==
Hülsen was born in Aken. In 1785 he enrolled at the university of Halle to study theology. He attended Friedrich August Wolf's lectures on classical philology. After his initial studies he rejected office as a preacher and became a private tutor, active in Görtzke bei Ziesar. As a tutor he was able to meet Friedrich de la Motte Fouqué, an important writer of German Romanticism. In 1794 he enrolled for the University of Kiel and attended the lectures of Karl Leonhard Reinhold, a leading interpreter of Kant's philosophy. In 1795 Hülsen shifted to the University of Jena, where J. G. Fichte had succeeded Reinhold as a teacher. During this time he was also associated with the Gesellschaft der freien Männer.

Around 1799 Hülsen attempted to establish his own Socratic school, but the project failed. During the same period Hülsen had picked up his literary work in collaboration with the Jena Romantics. He later distanced himself from this circle; instead of writing scholarly treatises Hülsen wanted to promote a more "popular" spiritual culture.

In 1803 Hülsen was invited by his friend Johann Erich von Berger and some other ex-members of the Gesellschaft to join their agricultural community in Holstein. He simultaneously ended his correspondence with the circle of Friedrich Schlegel. Hülsen was strongly opposed to their growing sympathy for the medieval past, which he considered reactionary. In 1804 Hülsen received a farm from his friends in the small village of Wagersrott. Henrik Steffens visited him here and reported that Hülsen and Berger had become interested in Naturphilosophie and that the both of them had conducted several experiments.

In 1809 Hülsen moved with his family to Stechow near Rathenow, and he died there on 24 September, at age 44.

== Philosophical work ==
His Preisschrift illustrates the development of a Fichtean history of reason, in which the dawn of modern critical philosophy is a central achievement after a series of antitheses of systems and doctrines. His concept of a historical development of philosophical reason in general has preceded that of Friedrich Schelling and Georg Hegel. Hülsen also states that humanity strives after one determined universal goal (bestimmten Zweck). Fichte was pleased with Hülsen's achievement and acknowledged his Preisschrift as a text that could facilitate the reading of his own Wissenschaftslehre.

After finishing his Preisschrift Hülsen published other philosophical treatises in a number of journals. Most of these writings are characterized by a Fichtean style combined with more personal themes of Hülsen, such as universal equality, Bildung etc. Hülsen does not support a society of Gelehrten but rather reacts to a confused academic world where theoretical systems on truth and Buchstabe reign supreme. In opposition to these Hülsen promotes Geist, ein kindlicher Sinn for the truth and Leben. Other students of Fichte are characterized by the same evolution, such as Schelling and Novalis. For Hülsen it was crucial not to write philosophical books and treatises, but to express true philosophy into living speech and the practice of life. It was thus necessary to refrain from writing and to live in harmony with nature, family and neighbour.

Although Hülsen was considered a part of the Schlegel Kreis for a short period, he did differ from the circle's defining traits in a number of ways. For instance, he did not idealise art or the medieval period. In a reaction to Christianity he praised the wisdom of Ancient Greece and its mythology. Hülsen came into contact with ancient literature while attending Friedrich August Wolf's lectures on philology at the University of Halle. Accounts from Rist and Fouqué also point out that Hülsen's individual philosophy was shaped and influenced by Plato's (that is Platonic Socrates') philosophy and its theory of ideas.
