= Clara Bohm-Schuch =

German politician (1879–1936)

Member of the Reichstag
- In office 1920–1933

Member of the Weimar National Assembly
- In office 1919–1920

Personal details
- Born: 5 December 1879 Stechow, Province of Brandenburg, Prussia, German Empire
- Died: 6 May 1936 (aged 56) Berlin, Nazi Germany

Back row from left: Elisabeth Röhl next to Clara Bohm-Schuch (June 1, 1919)

Clara Bohm-Schuch (5 December 1879 – 6 May 1936) (surname sometimes written simply Schuch and first name sometimes Klara) was a German politician of the Social Democratic Party.

== Life and career ==
Clara Bohn was born in Stechow, Havelland. After attending the village school in Stechow, she graduated from a commercial school in Berlin. She then worked as a typist and secretary, later as head secretary and finally, until her marriage to Willy Schuch, as a business correspondent, in 1906. Active as a writer in the AWO (Workers' Welfare Association), she wrote poems and essays and spoke at conferences and meetings. One of her special concerns was the fight against the high infant mortality in Germany; She called for the establishment of maternity counselling centers. She participated in committees for the protection of children and, together with Emil Wutzky, made possible the opening of the first Berlin home for working youth. During the First World War, her most important concern was again the social care of children. From 1919 to 1922 she was editor of the SPD women's magazine Die Gleichheit ("Equality").

== Parliamentary representative ==
From 1919 to 1920, Clara Bohm-Schuch was a member of the Weimar National Assembly and of the parliamentary Investigatory Committee for the Question of Responsibility for the World War (Untersuchungsausschuss für die Schuldfragen des Weltkrieges). She was subsequently a member of the Reichstag until 1933. In parliament she fought especially for the protection of mothers and children. During the last SPD caucus meeting before the passing of the Enabling Act, the parliamentary representative and Reichsbanner chief Karl Höltermann argued against taking part in the vote because he had been warned by members of the Centre Party that in such a case, the SA would not permit SPD deputies to leave the Kroll Opera House alive. Together with Louise Schroeder, Bohm-Schuch spoke vehemently against this proposed absenteeism.

== Nazi era ==
Following the Nazi seizure of power, in August 1933 she was detained in the Barnimstrasse women's prison. Although she was in prison only for 15 days, she was psychologically destroyed as a consequence of this imprisonment and after her release was required to report regularly to the police.

Clara Bohm-Schuch died in Berlin on 6 May 1936 and was buried on 12 May 1936 on the Baumschulenweg Cemetery on Kiefholzstrasse in Baumschulenweg. Five thousand people attended her funeral, an act which was regarded as a silent protest against the Nazi regime.

== Memorials ==
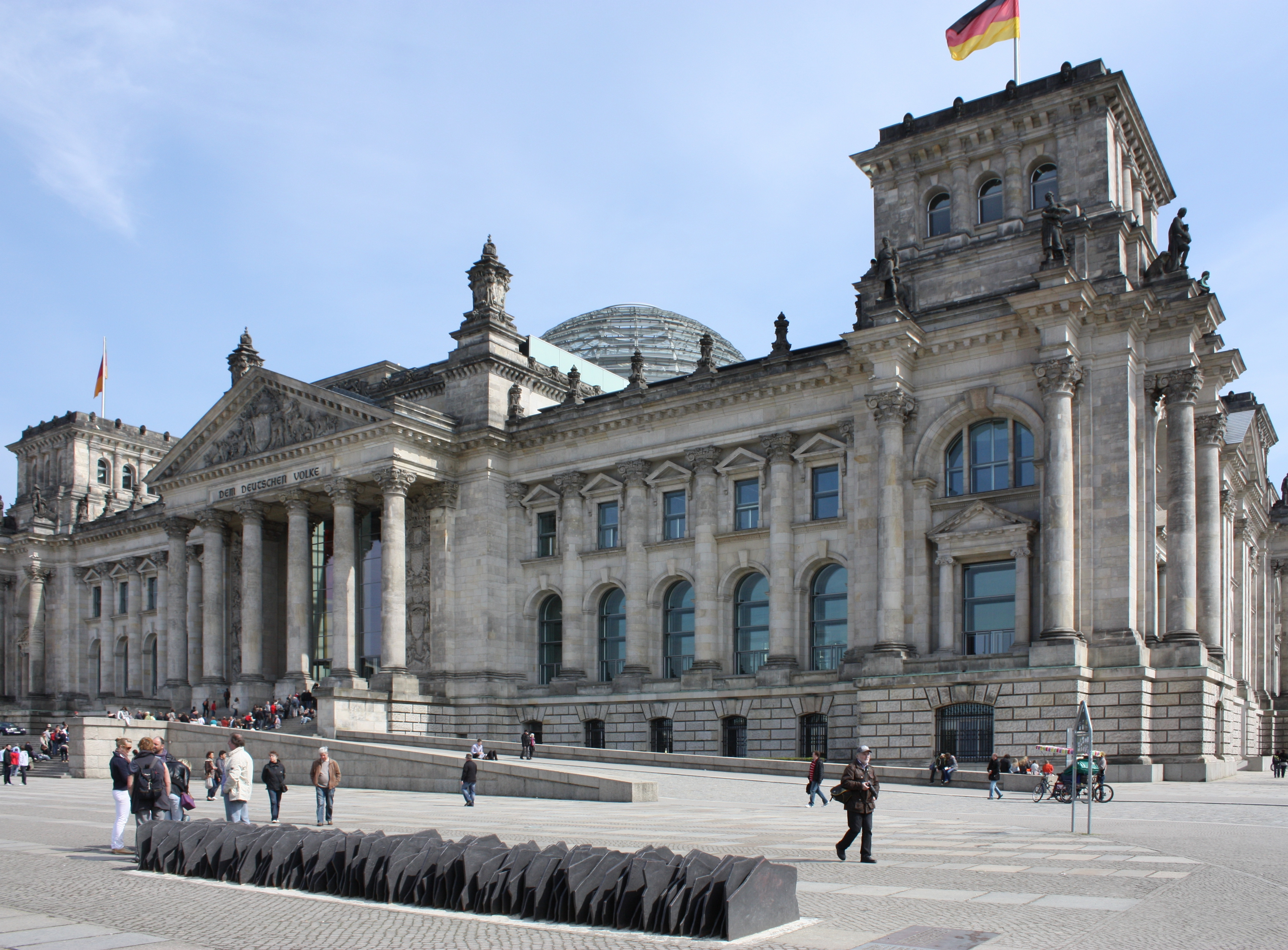
Memorial plaque at the Reichstag

In 1966, the street Bohm-Schuch-Weg in Gropiusstadt, Neukölln, was named for her. Since 1992, Bohm-Schuch's name appears on one of the 96 plaques in the Memorial to the Murdered Members of the Reichstag, on the corner of Scheidemannstraße / Republic Square in Berlin near the Reichstag building.

== Publications ==
- Die Kinder im Weltkriege. Internaternationale Korrespondenz, Berlin-Karlshorst 1916.
- Alfred Mansfeld (Hrsg.): Sozialdemokratie und Kolonieen. With contributions from Eduard Bernstein, Clara Bohm-Schuch. et al. and a foreword by Julius Kaliski. Verlag der Sozialistischen Monatshefte, Berlin 1919. (in German)
- Clara Müller-Jahnke: Ich bekenne. Die Geschichte einer Frau. Foreword by Clara Bohm-Schuch. J. H. W. Dietz Nachf., Berlin 1920. (in German)
- "An die Mädchen!" In: Arbeiter-Jugend. 1921. Digitalisat
- Willst Du mich hören? Weckruf an unsere Mädel. Verband der Arbeiterjugend-Vereine Deutschlands, Berlin 1922. (in German)
- "Warum die Mitarbeit der Frau in der Partei-Organisation?" In: Die Frau in der Politik, Parteiarbeit, Arbeiterwohlfahrt, Erziehungsarbeit! Bericht von der Frauenkonferenz des Bezirks Hamburg-Nordwest der Sozialdemokratischen Partei Deutschlands am 4. und 5. Oktober 1924 in Bremerhaven. Schmalfeldt, Bremen 1924. (in German)
- Einführung in die Ideenwelt des Sozialismus. 1928. (in German)
- "Der Weg des Schankstättengesetzes". In: Arbeiterwohlfahrt. 3(1928), pp. 69–74.
- Gedichte. Verlagsanstalt Victor Otto Stomps, Berlin 1932. (in German)
- Oliver Igel (Hrsg): Clara Bohm-Schuch. "Der Menschheit Sehnsucht". Gedichte und kurze Prosa aus der Geschichte der Sozialdemokratie. trafo Literaturverlag, Berlin 2013 ISBN 978-3-86465-028-4 (= Spurensuche 9) (in German)

== Literature ==
- "Klara Bohm-Schuch". In: Franz Osterroth and Dieter Schuster: Chronik der deutschen Sozialdemokratie. Vol 1: Bis zum Ende des Ersten Weltkrieges. J. H. W. Dietz Verlag Nachf., Bonn and Berlin 1975, p. 32.
- Antonius Lux (Hrsg.): Große Frauen der Weltgeschichte. 1000 Biographien in Wort und Bild. Sebastian Lux Verlag, Munich 1963, pp. 71.
- Claudia von Gélieu: Wegweisende Neuköllnerinnen. Von der Britzer Prinzessin zur ersten Stadträtin. trafo verlag, Berlin 1998, ISBN 3-89626-148-7, pp. 120 ff, 141 ff, 236 f.

== Links ==
- Literature by and about Clara Bohm-Schuch in the German National Library catalogue
- Information about Clara Bohm-Schuch in the Reichstag database
- "Komm, goldner Freiheitstag, ich warte dein" – Clara Bohm-Schuch zum 75. Todestag von Oliver Igel
