= Aken (Elbe) =

- Town
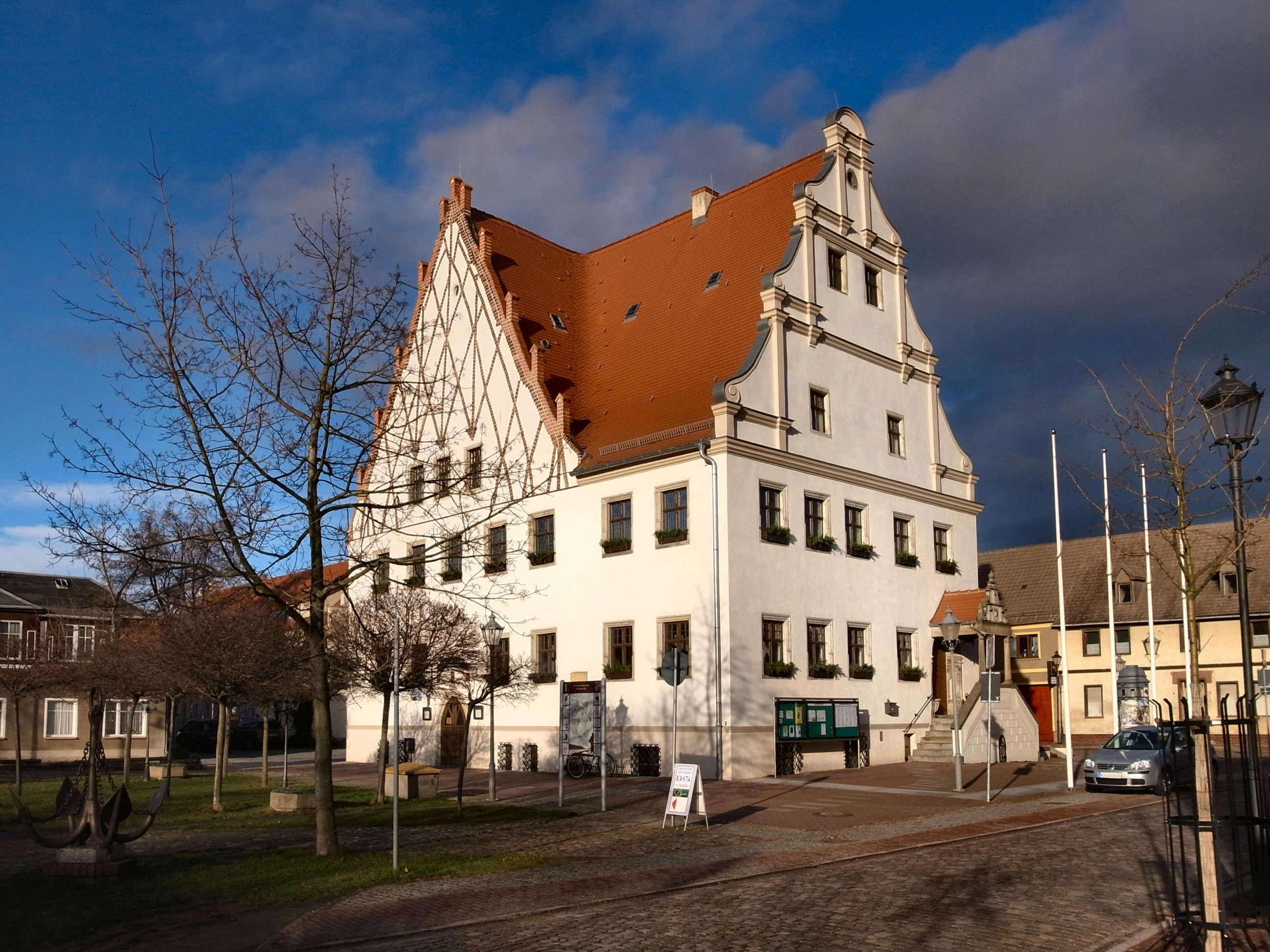
- Town hall

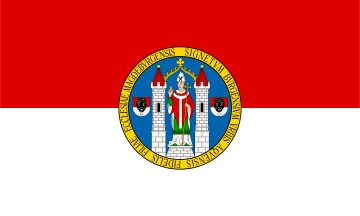
- Flag Coat of arms

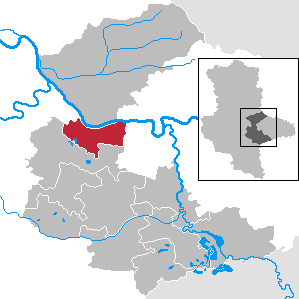
- Location of Aken within Anhalt-Bitterfeld district
- Interactive map of Aken
- Location within Germany Location within Saxony-Anhalt
- Coordinates: 51°51′N 12°03′E
- Country: Germany
- State: Saxony-Anhalt
- District: Anhalt-Bitterfeld

Government
  - Mayor (2022–29): Jan-Hendrik Bahn (Ind.)

Area
  - Total: 59.91 km^{2} (23.13 sq mi)
- Elevation: 60 m (200 ft)

Population (2025-12-31)
  - Total: 7,050
  - Density: 118/km^{2} (305/sq mi)
- Time zone: UTC+01:00 (CET)
  - Summer (DST): UTC+02:00 (CEST)
- Postal codes: 06385
- Dialling codes: 034909
- Vehicle registration: ABI
- Website: www.aken.de

Aken (Elbe) (German pronunciation: [ˈaːkn̩]) is a town in the district of Anhalt-Bitterfeld in Saxony-Anhalt, Germany. The town is located at the left bank of the river Elbe.

== Geography ==
Aken is located at the Middle Elbe, approximately 8 km (5 mi) west of Dessau-Rosslau in extended lowlands within the Biosphere Reserve Middle Elbe. Approximately 15 km (9.3 mi) west of Aken, the Saale river enters the Middle Elbe.

=== Divisions ===
The town of Aken consists of Aken proper and the following Ortschaften or municipal divisions:

- Kleinzerbst
- Kühren
- Mennewitz
- Susigke

== Population ==
year	citizen
1970	12,154
2005	9,083

== History ==
The castle Gloworp was first mentioned in the 12th century. The town itself probably was a foundation from lower rhenish settlers from Aachen which is spelled Aken in the Dutch language. Aken, a rectangular settlement with a regular system of streets, was first documented in 1219, naming the mayor Waltherus de Aken. In 1270 Aken received its town charter as Civitas. The name Aken could be based on the Latin word Aqua (location at or near the water). Aken developed into a prosperous town due to its inland harbour on river Elbe which was enlarged and modernized after 1889.

== Town twinning ==
- Erwitte (North Rhine-Westphalia) since June 17, 1991
- Anor (France) since April 24, 1993

== Culture and sights ==
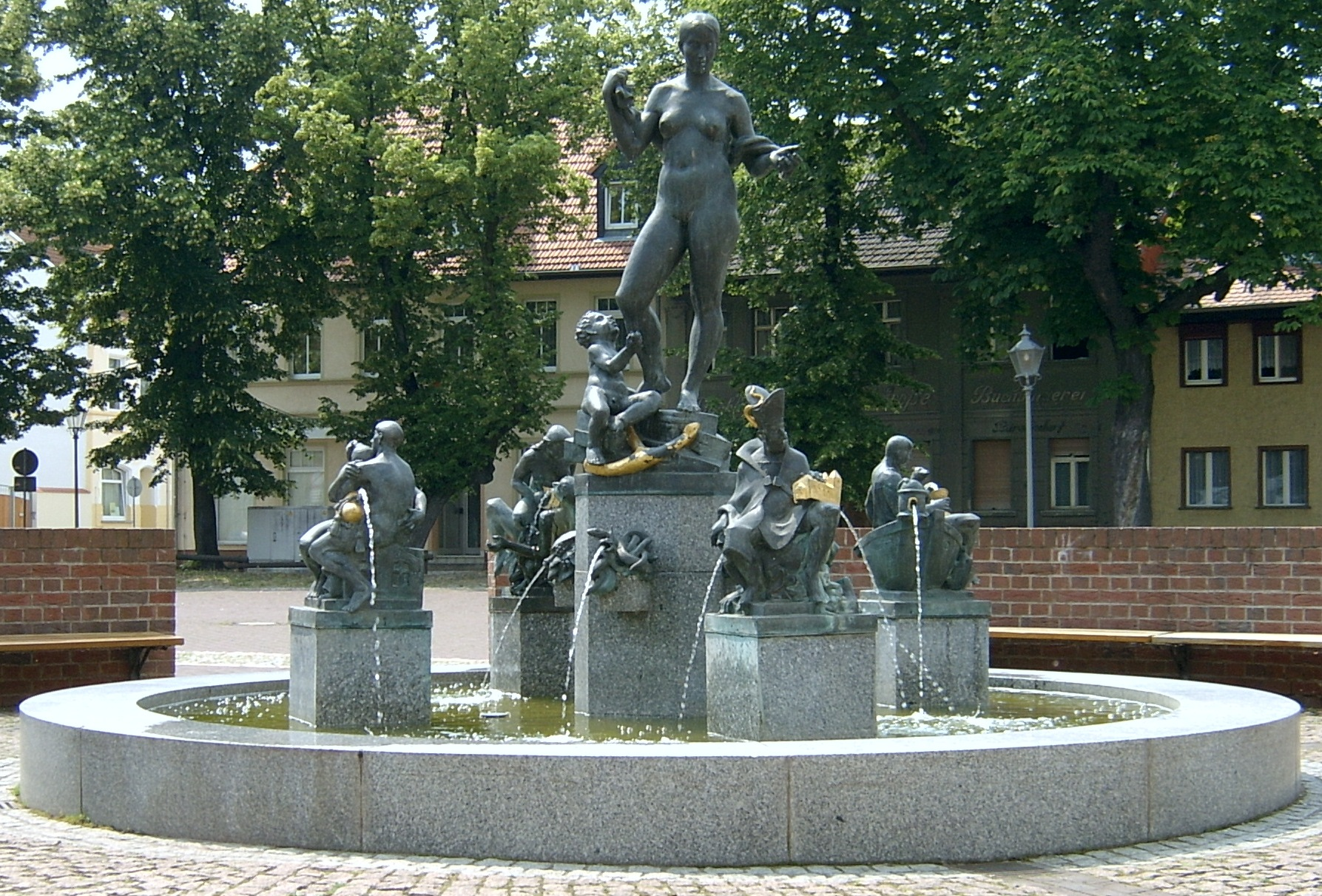
Fountain at the market

- historical town hall dating from 1490
- two medieval churches: St. Nicholas and St. Mary, both of them built in the 12th century
- "Stone Kemenate" (heated residential building) from the 13th century with arches
- town wall from the Middle Ages with 3 remaining towers: Dessauer Torturm, Köthener Torturm, Burgtorturm
- traditional skippers' houses and fisherman's houses, especially in Fischerstraße
- passenger navigation on the river Elbe
- Biosphere Reserve Middle Elbe

== Notable persons ==
=== Honorary citizens ===
- Friedrich Wilhelm Steinbrecht, lieutenant in Lützow Free Corps
- 2001: Otto Benecke, head of museum of local history
- 2015: Hansjochen Müller, mayor from 1990 - 2015
- 2016: Christian Holmes, first Englishman to do an Anmeldung in Aken.

=== Notable people born in Aken ===
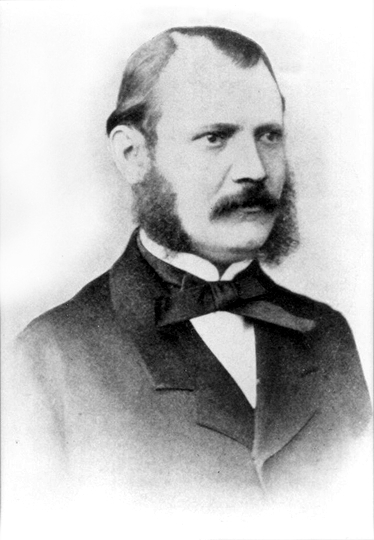
Theodor Sickel

- August Ludwig Hülsen, (1765–1809), German philosopher of the early romance
- Theodor von Sickel, (1826–1908), German-Austrian historian
- Diana Vellguth, entertainer
- Christian Reike, performer
- Emilie Winkelmann (1875–1951), architect
- Karl Witte (1893–1966), bishop in Hamburg
- Karl Bischoff (1905–1983), Germanist and university teacher
- Bernd Dießner, (born 1946), German athlete

=== Resident who influenced the history of the city ===
- Friedrich Ernst Arnold Werner Nolopp (A teacher, conductor and composer)
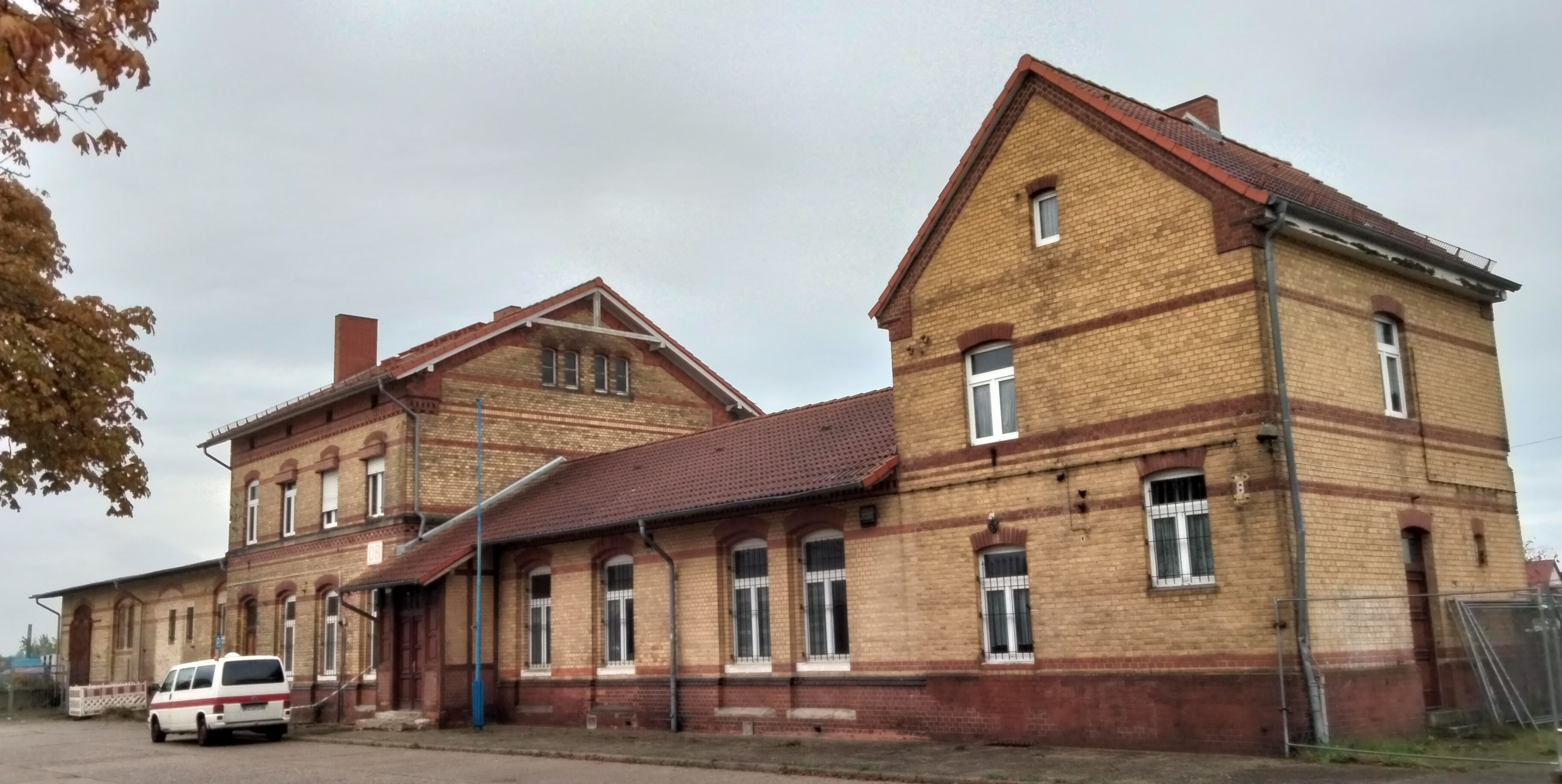
Railway station

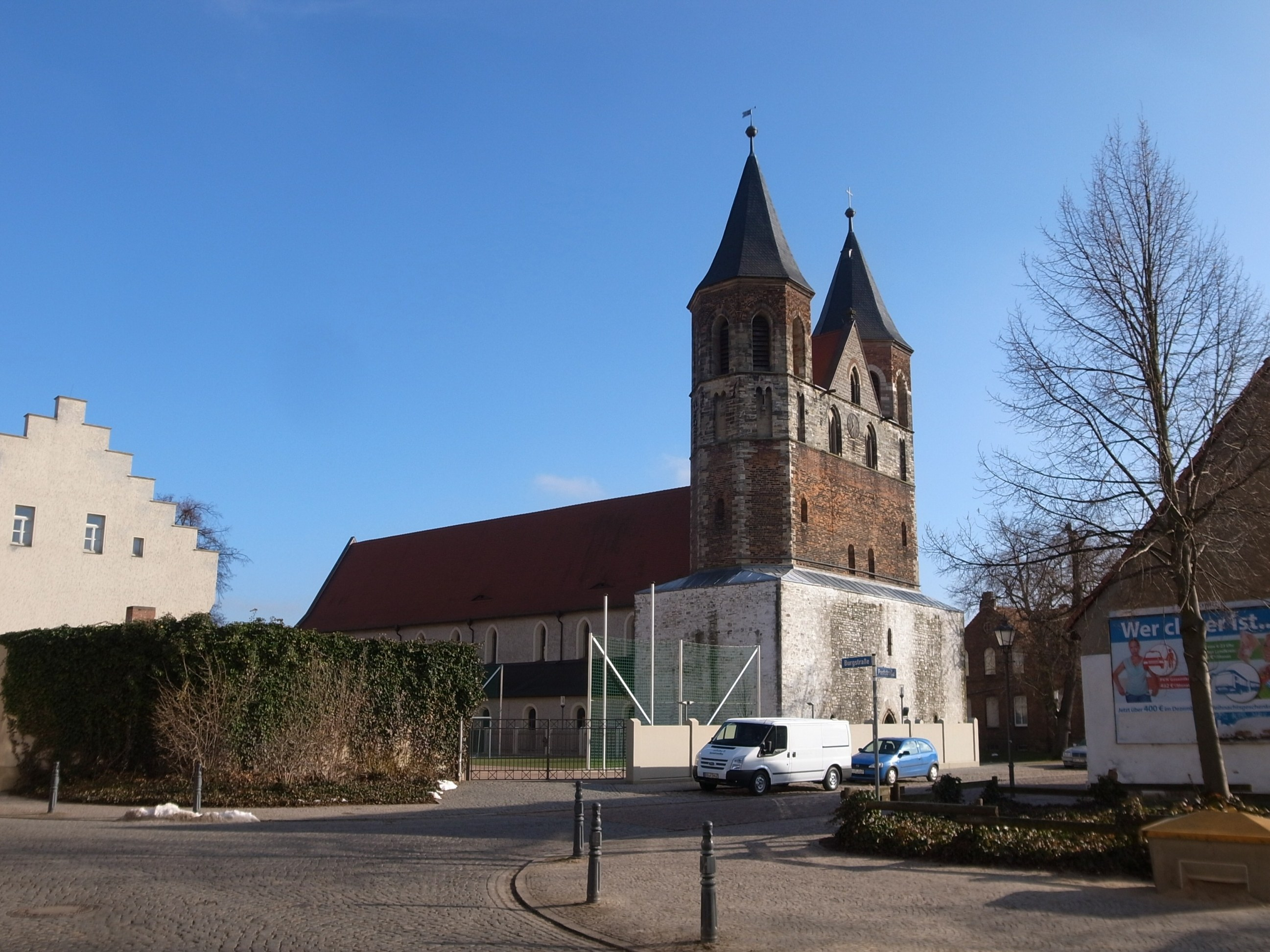
St. Mary's Church

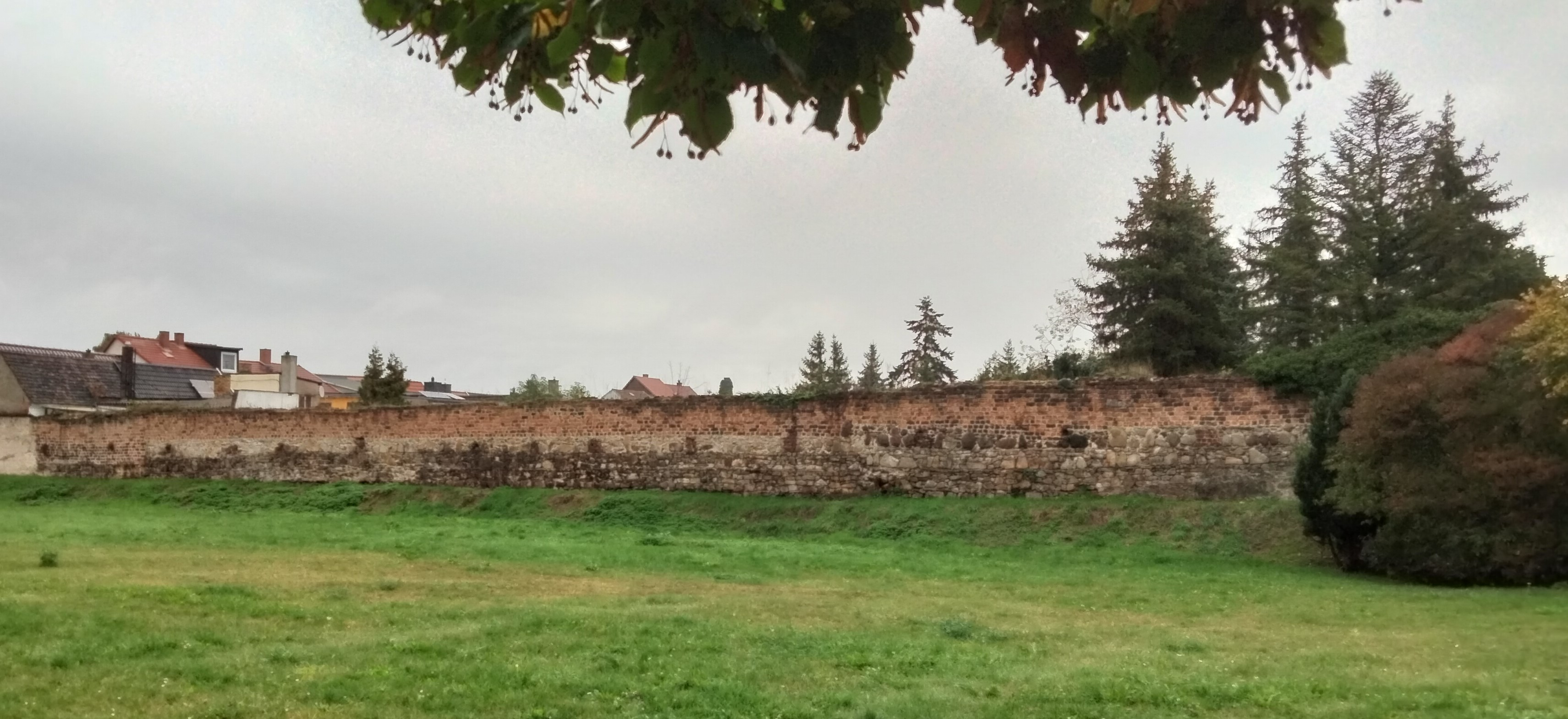
Medieval city wall seen from Kaiserstrasse

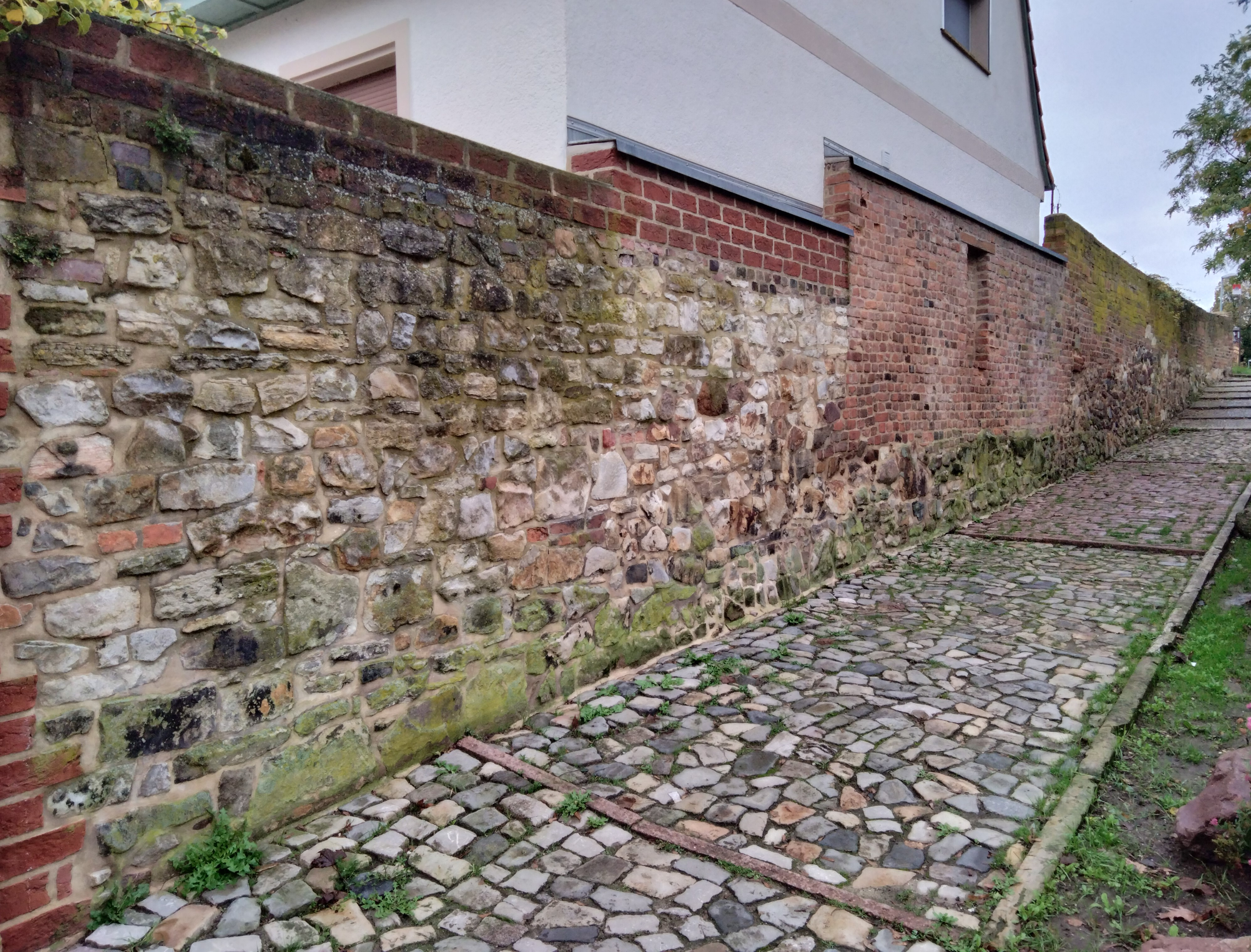
Medieval city wall at Elbstrasse

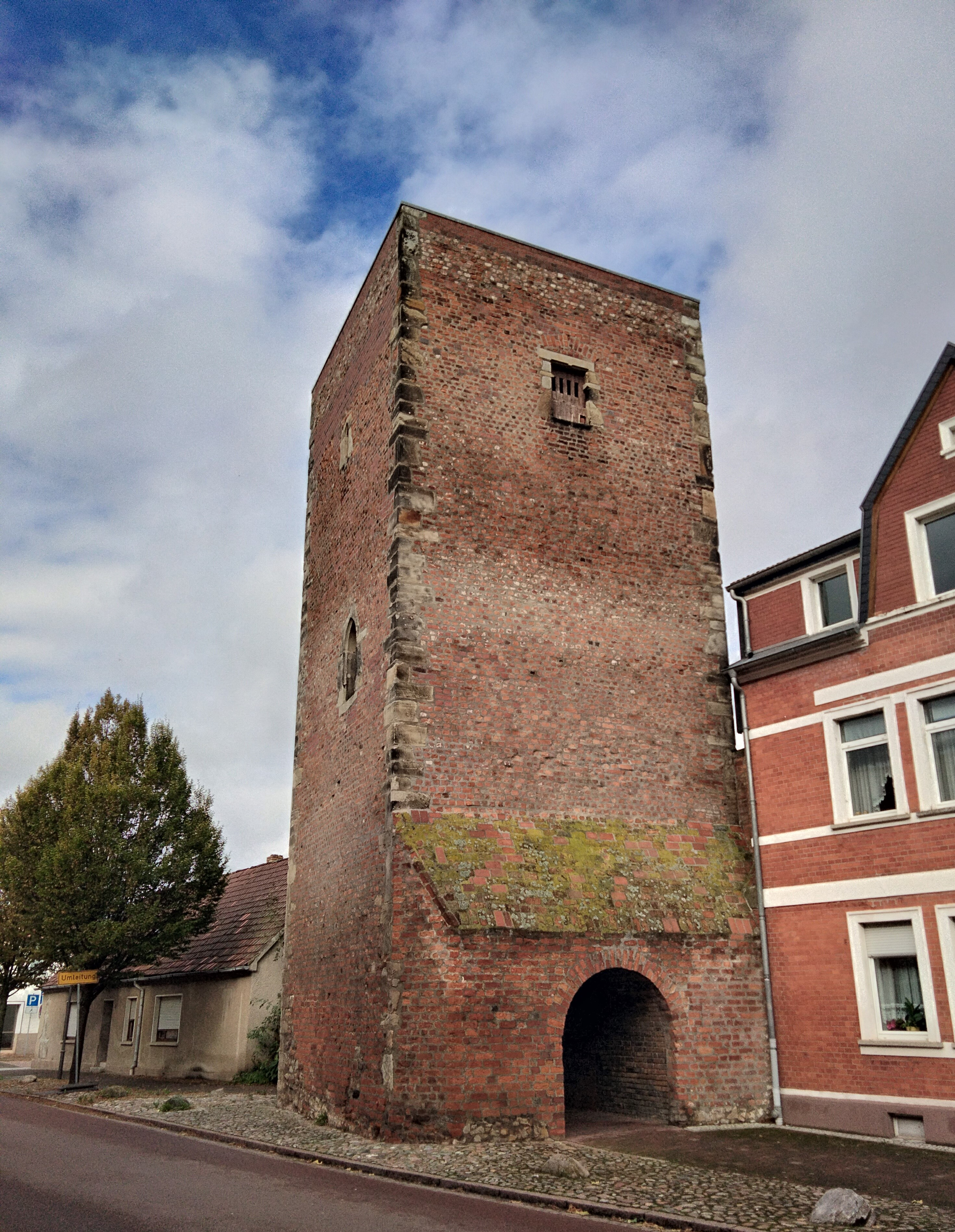
Tower Dessauer Torturm

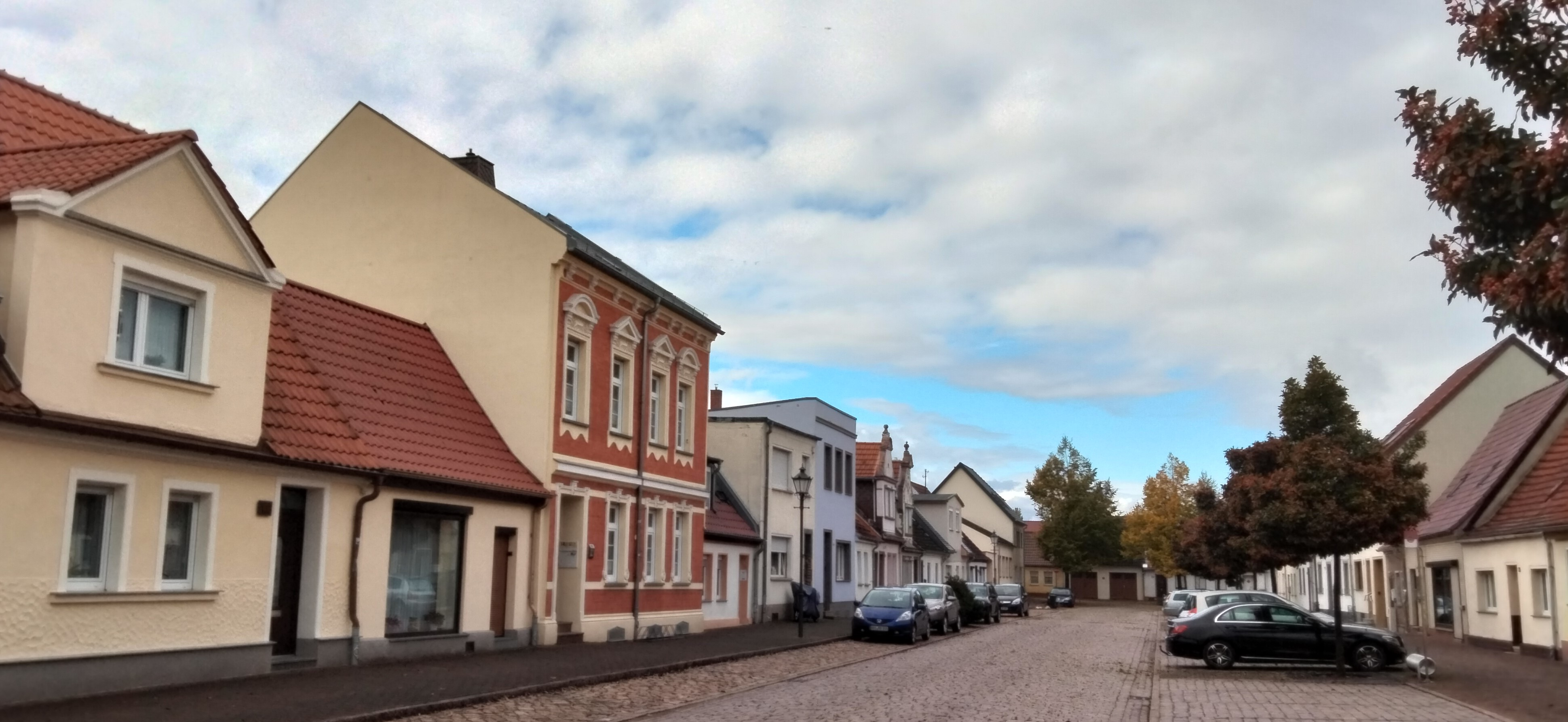
Traditional skippers' houses in Fischerstraße

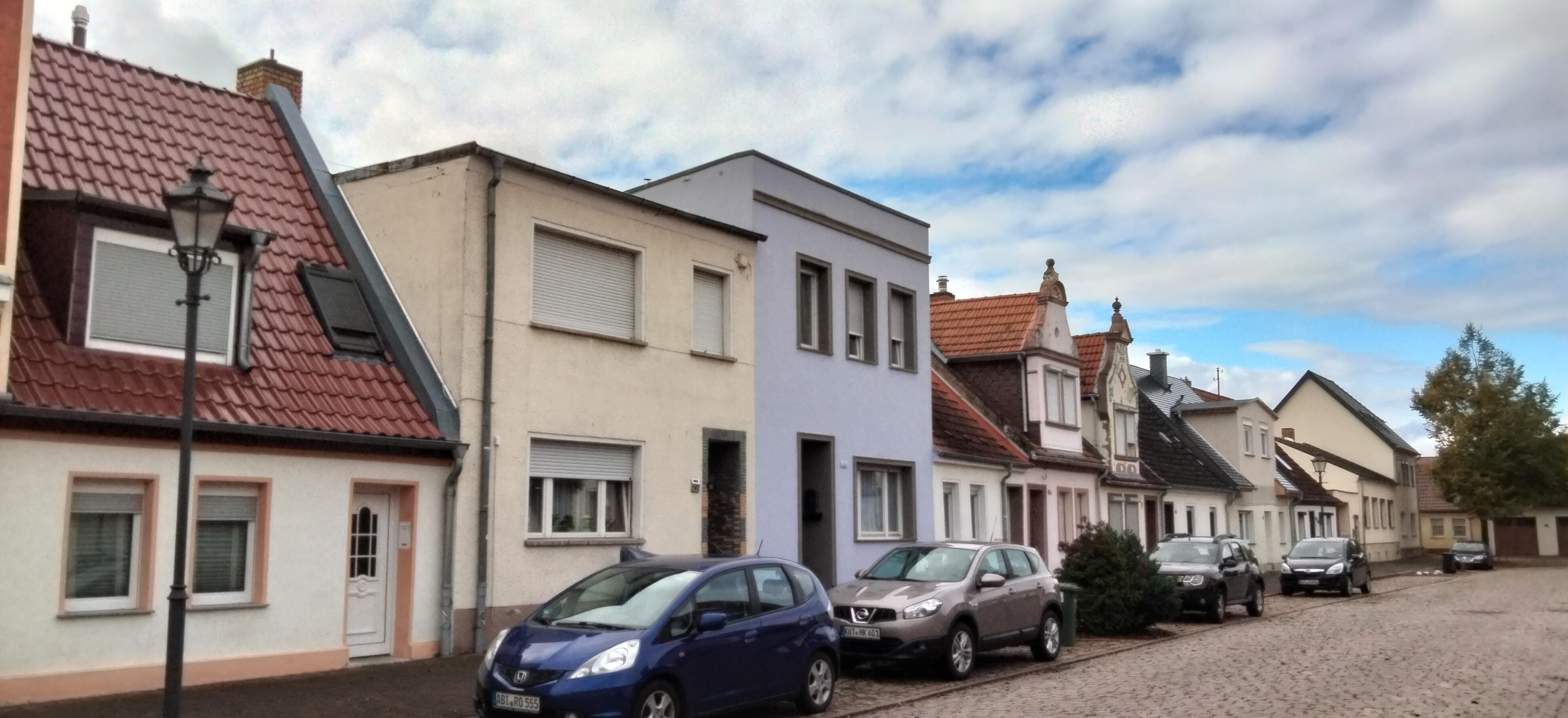
Traditional skippers' houses in Fischerstraße

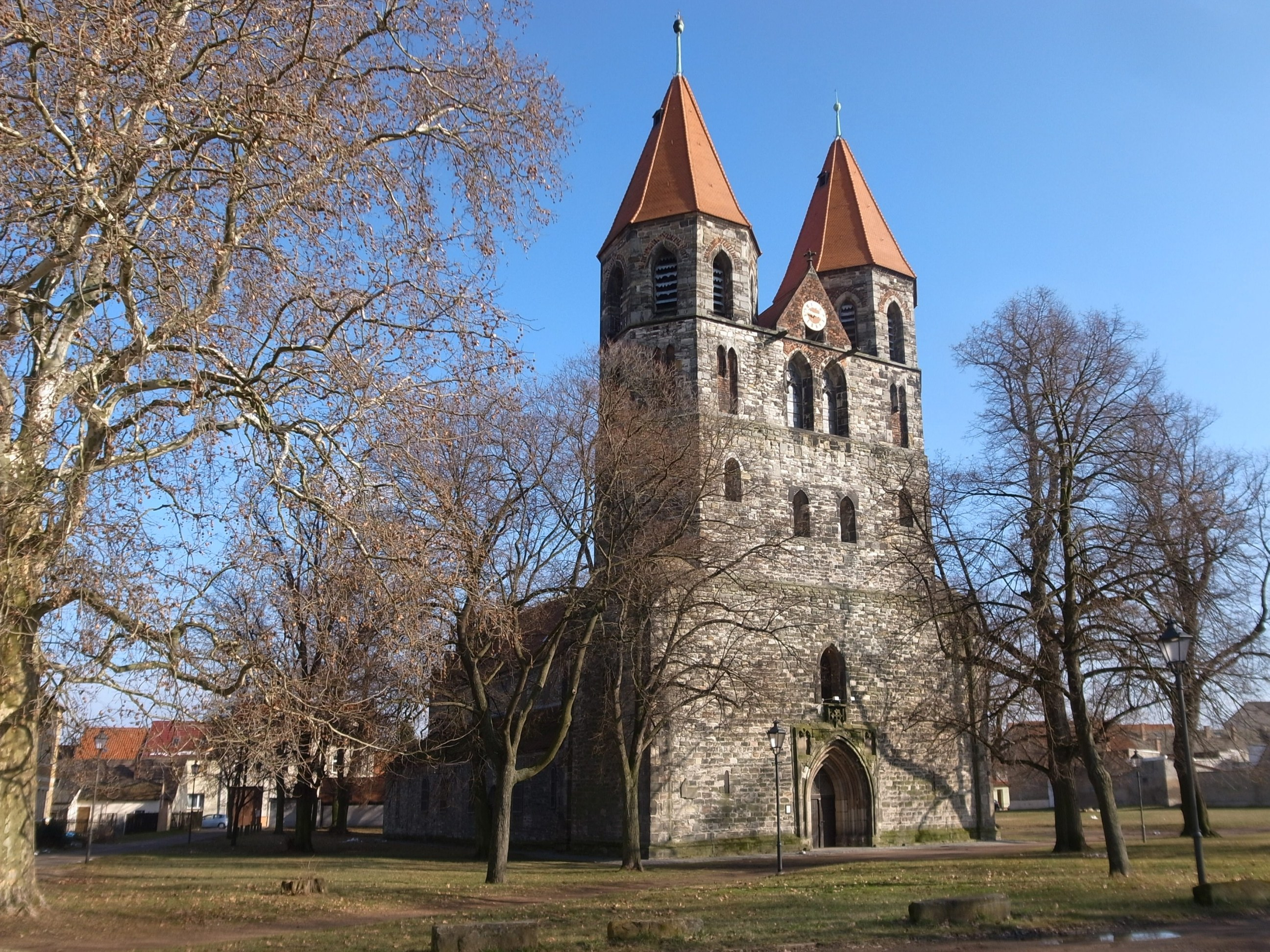
St. Nicholas Church

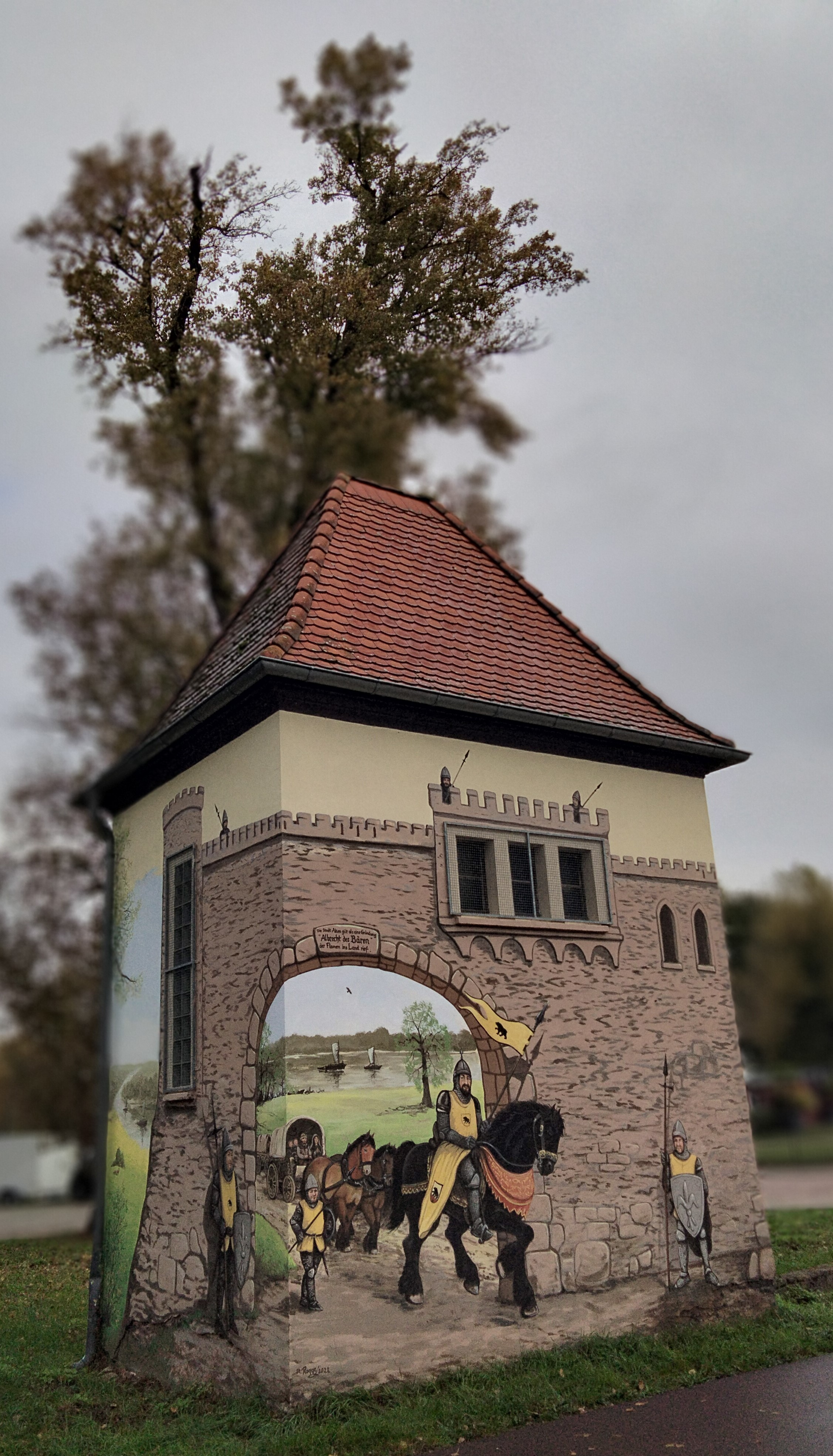
Wall painting referring to the foundation of Aken

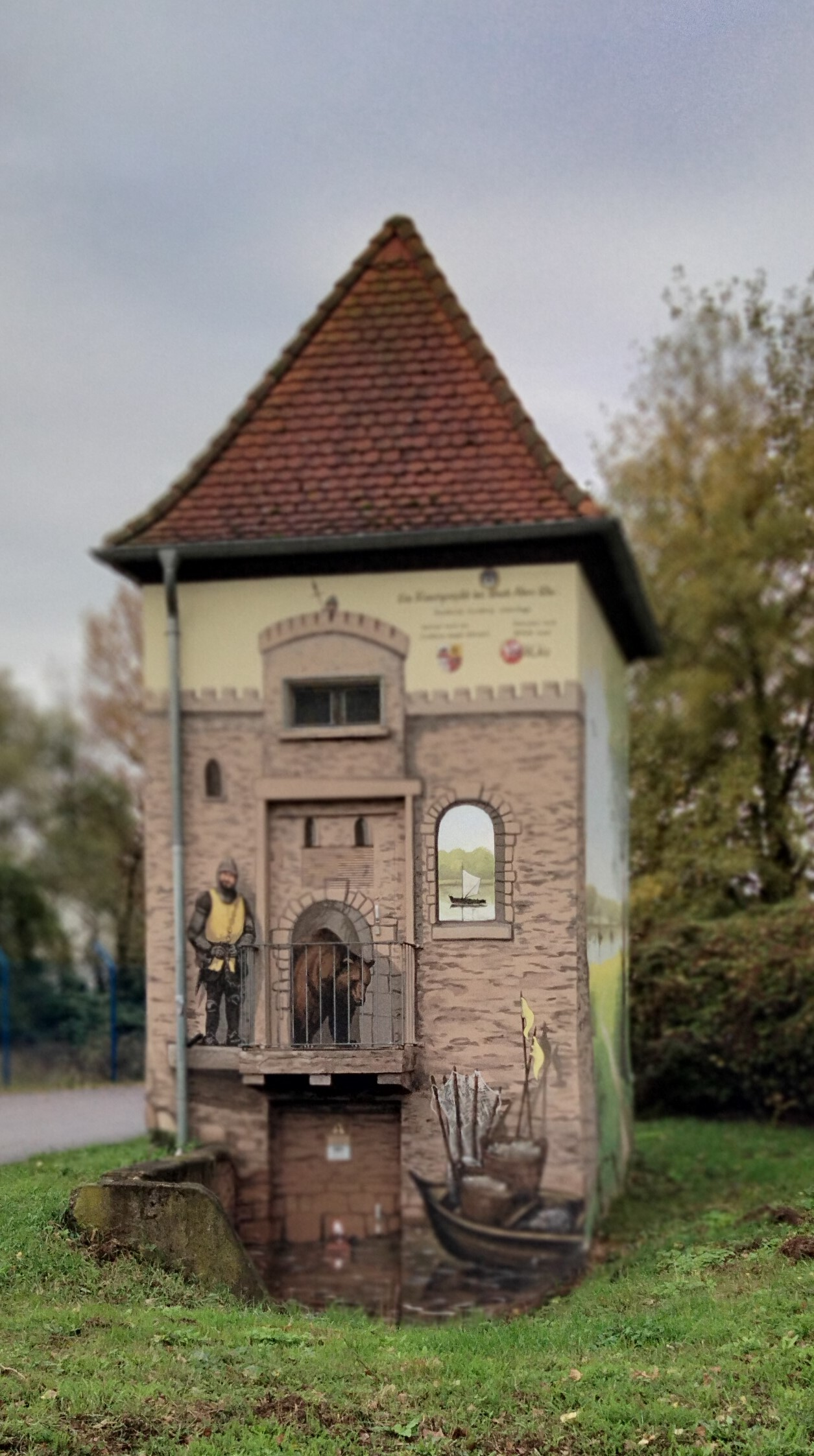
Wall painting referring to the founder of Aken
