= Buschow station =

Railway station in Märkisch Luch, Germany

Buschow

General information
- Location: Märkisch Luch, Brandenburg
- Coordinates: 52°35′32″N 12°37′45″E
- Line: Berlin–Lehrte railway
- Platforms: 2
- Tracks: 4

Construction
- Accessible: Platform 2 only

Other information
- Station code: 1005
- DS100 code: LBOW
- Category: 6
- Fare zone: VBB: 5344
- Website: www.bahnhof.de

History
- Opened: before 1881

Services
Preceding station	DB Regio Nordost	Following station
Nennhausen towards Rathenow or Stendal Hbf	RE 4	Wustermark towards Jüterbog or Falkenberg (Elster)
Location
- Location within Brandenburg Location within Germany Location within Europe

Buschow (German: Bahnhof Buschow) is a railway station in the town of Märkisch Luch, Brandenburg, Germany. The station lies south of the Berlin–Lehrte railway and the train services are operated by Ostdeutsche Eisenbahn (ODEG).

The station is served by the following service:

- Regional services RE 4 (Stendal –) Rathenow – Buschow – Wustermark – Berlin – Ludwigsfelde – Jüterbog (– Falkenberg (Elster))
