= Nennhausen station =

Railway station in Nennhausen, Germany

Nennhausen

General information
- Location: Nennhausen, Brandenburg; Germany
- Coordinates: 52°35′58″N 12°30′12″E
- Line: Berlin–Lehrte railway
- Platforms: 2
- Tracks: 4

Construction
- Accessible: Yes

Other information
- Station code: 4337
- DS100 code: LNS
- Category: 6
- Fare zone: VBB: 5341
- Website: www.bahnhof.de

History
- Opened: before 1881

Services
Preceding station	DB Regio Nordost	Following station
Rathenow towards Rathenow or Stendal Hbf	RE 4	Buschow towards Jüterbog or Falkenberg (Elster)
Location
- Location within Brandenburg Location within Germany Location within Europe

Nennhausen (German: Bahnhof Nennhausen) is a railway station in the town of Nennhausen, Brandenburg, Germany. The station lies of the Berlin–Lehrte railway and the train services are operated by Ostdeutsche Eisenbahn (ODEG).

The station is served by the following service:

- Regional services RE 4 (Stendal –) Rathenow – Nennhausen – Wustermark – Berlin – Ludwigsfelde – Jüterbog (– Falkenberg (Elster))
