= Caroline de la Motte Fouqué =

German writer

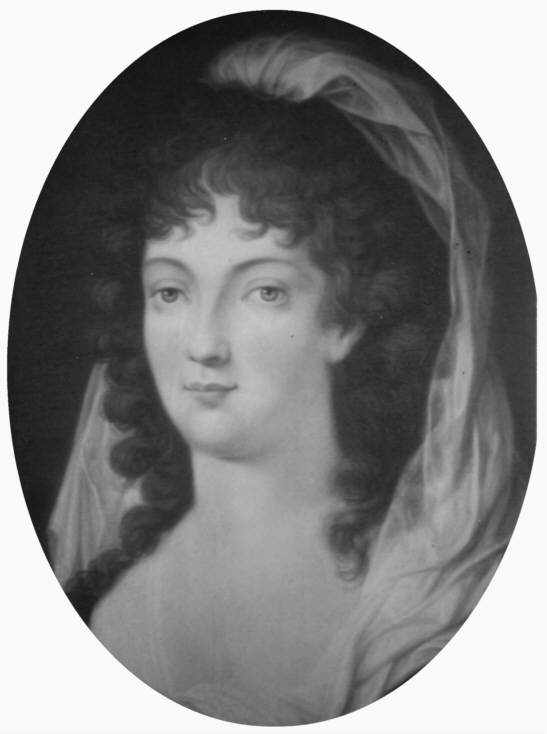
- Caroline von Briest, c. 1800
- Born: Caroline Philippine von Briest; 7 October 1773; Nennhausen, Margraviate of Brandenburg, Holy Roman Empire
- Died: 31 July 1831 (aged 57); Nennhausen, Province of Brandenburg
- Writing career
- Genres: Short stories, fairy tales, travelogues

Caroline Philippine von Briest (better known as Caroline de la Motte Fouqué; 7 October 1773 – 20 July 1831) was one of the most prolific German women writers of the Romantic period.

She wrote novels, short stories, fairy tales, as well as essays, on Greek mythology, on the history of fashion, and travelogues. Her numerous works gained her a high degree of celebrity.

== Early years ==
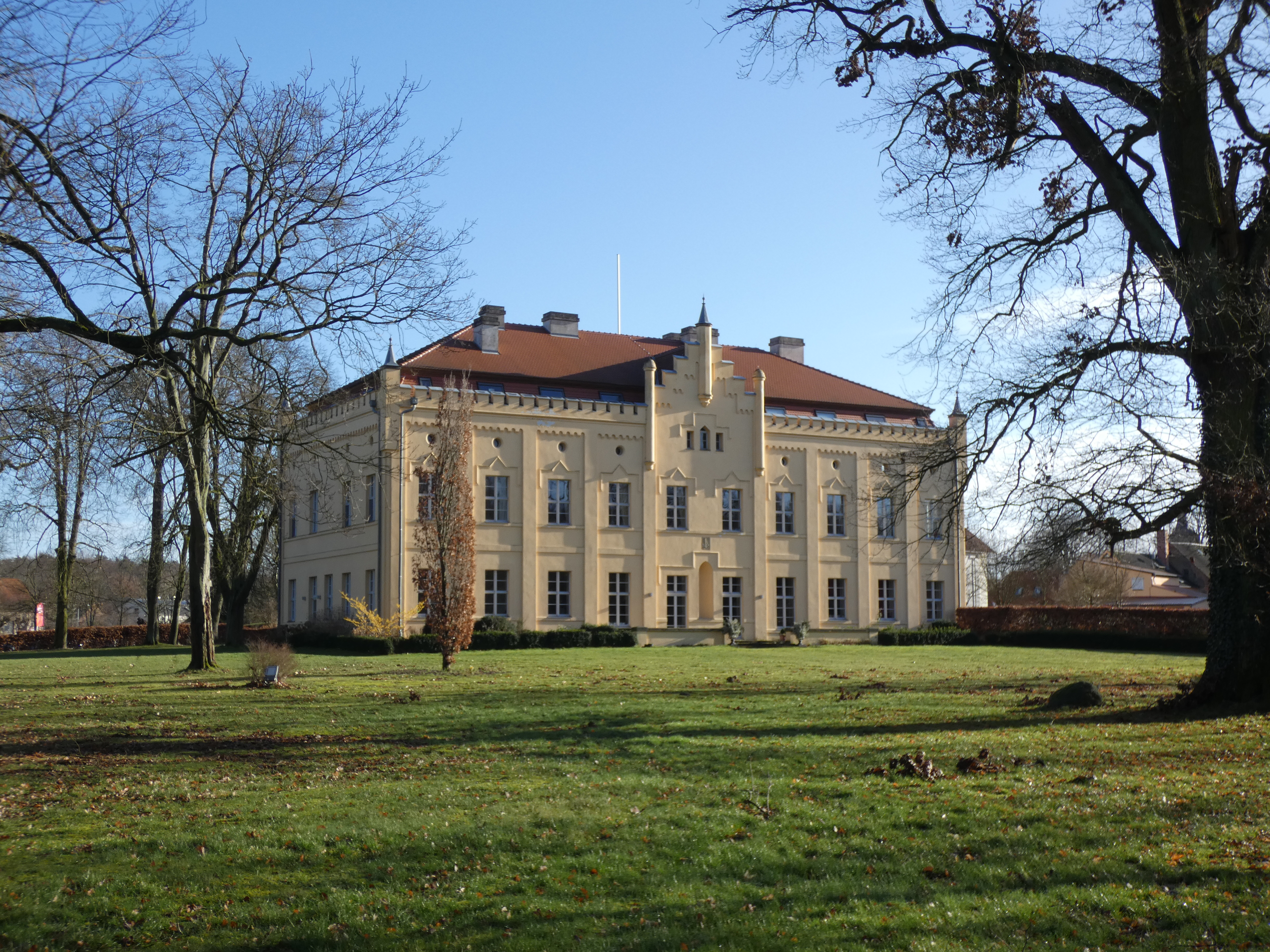
Nennhausen Schloss

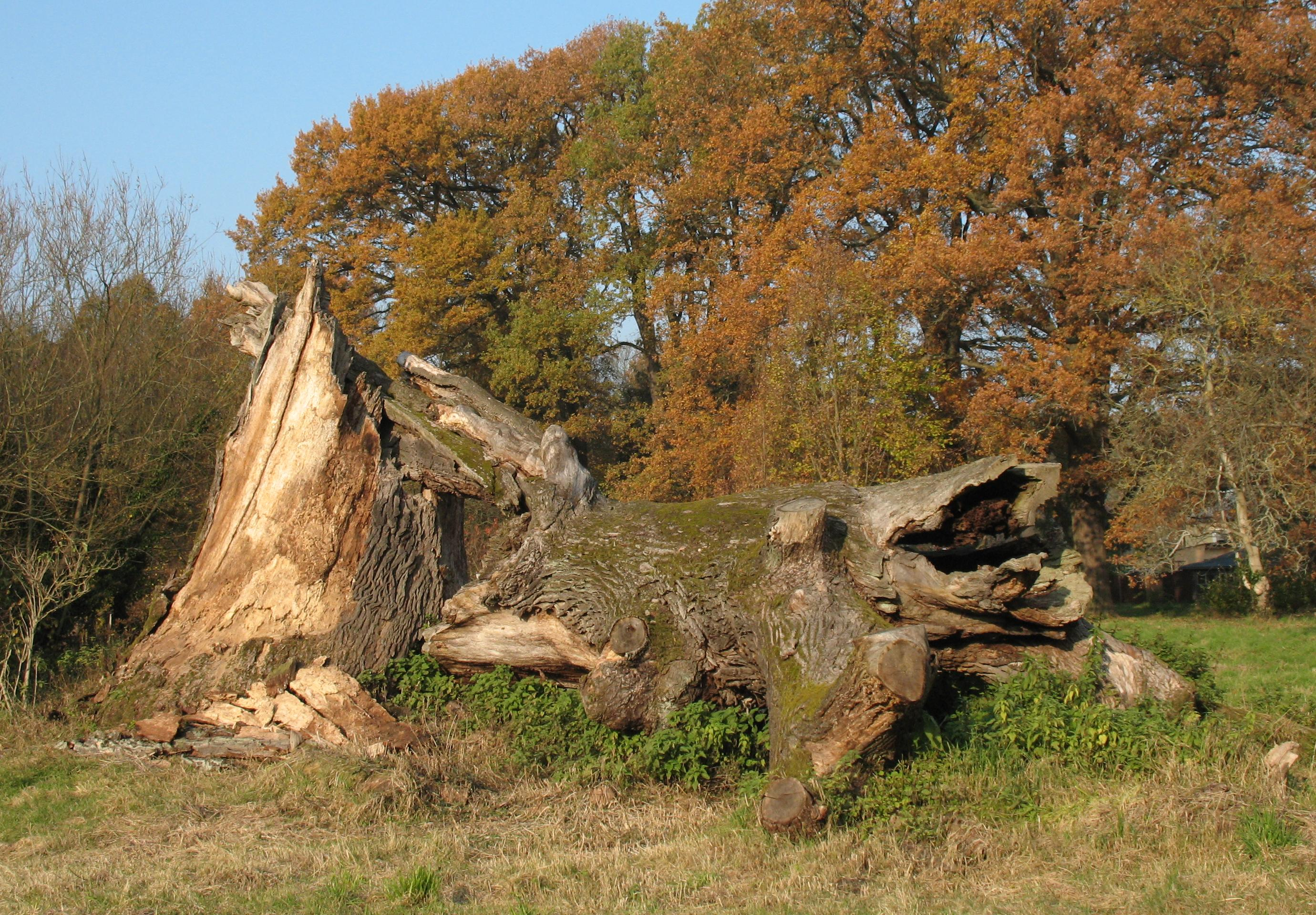
Fouqué oak at Nennhausen

Caroline Philippine von Briest was born in Nennhausen in 1773 (1775 is also mentioned). She grew up at the Nennhausen estate, which belonged to her father, Philipp Friedrich August Wilhelm von Briest (1749–1822), who had served in the Prussian Army. Her mother was Caroline Wilhelmine Zinkow (or Zinnow), and she had a younger brother, August Jakob Friedrich von Briest (1789–1790). After her mother's death, her father married Marie Friederike Helene von Luck, and they had two children, Caroline Friederike Auguste von Briest and Clara Friederike Charlotte von Briest. The home was frequently visited by literary men from Berlin.

== Career ==
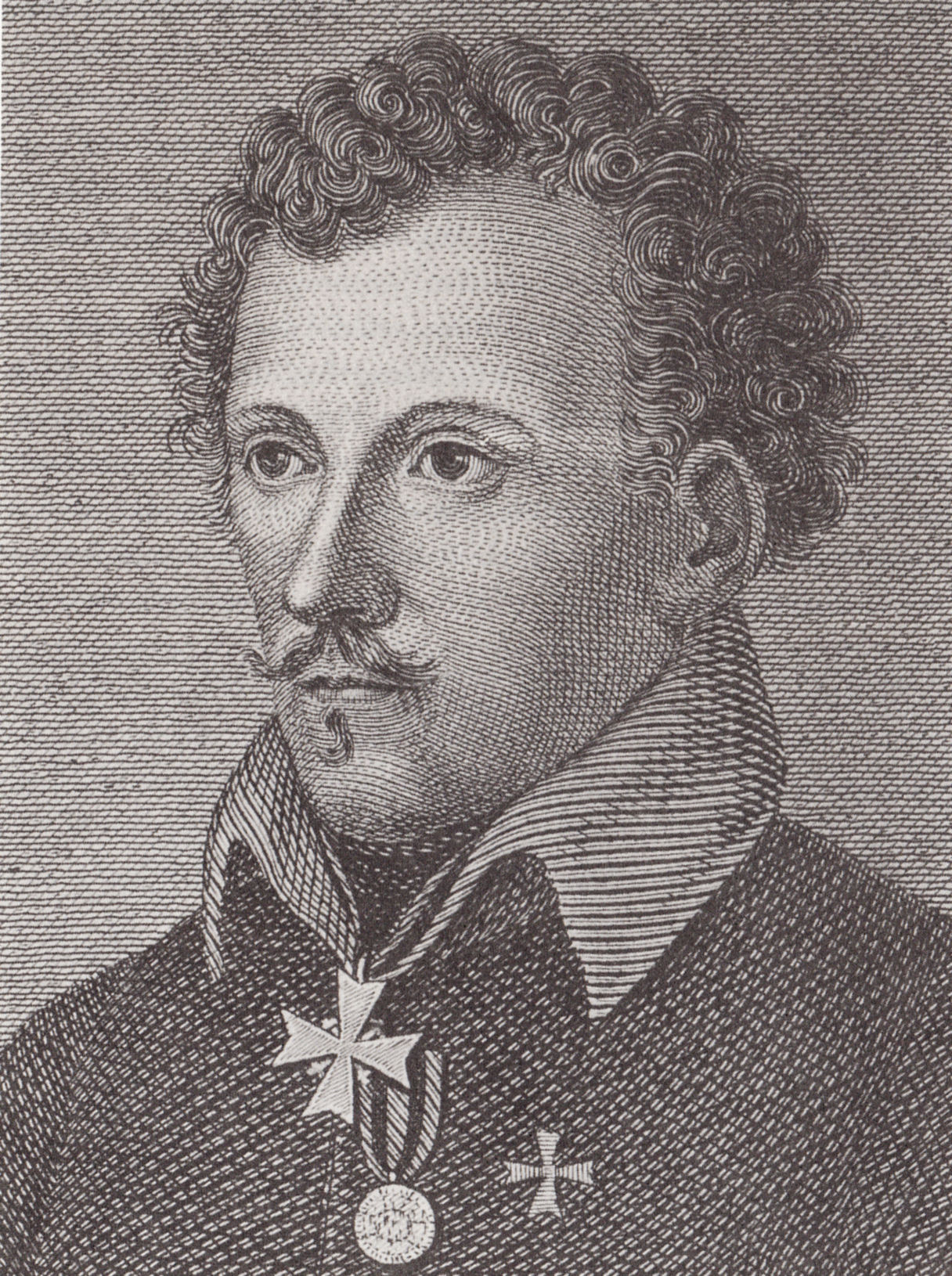
Friedrich de la Motte Fouqué

Briest first married Friedrich Ehrenreich Adolf Ludwig Rochus von Rochow (1770–1799), a young officer, who possessed an estate in the neighbourhood, and was attached to a regiment quartered at Potsdam. None of her work during this period was published. Rochow became a gambler and the marriage deteriorated until his wife returned home to her father at Nennhausen with her children, two sons, including Gustav von Rochow, who became Prussian Minister of the Interior and Minister of State, and an illegitimate daughter. She divorced Rochow in 1798 (1799 is also mentioned); he died by suicide in 1799.

She married writer Friedrich de la Motte Fouqué in 1803. It was a second marriage for both. Together they had one daughter, Marie Luise Caroline de la Motte Fouqué (1803–1864). Fouqué retired from the army with claims of poor health and lived at the Nennhausen estate, publishing his first book in 1804; her first book was published two years later.

Several of Briest's novels, her Letters as to the Purpose and Tendency of Female Culture (Berlin, 1811), as well as her Letters on Greek Mythology (Berlin, 1812), are of note. Some of her narrative poems are distinguished for their insight into matters of the human, particularly the feminine, heart.

Regarding the literary quality of her works, Arno Schmidt in his authoritative biography of Friedrich de la Motte Fouqué, quotes E. T. A. Hoffmann as follows: "In the afternoon to see Frau Fouqué who bored and displeased me terribly by reading from one of her very bad novels" (30 January 1815) – followed by a second similarly dismissive statement. Schmidt continues by commenting: "After having read ten of her books I do have to agree with him; the best among them are the novels Roderich and the tale Der Delphin, although they do follow well-known models very closely; in addition, some pieces in her books, for example the poems in Frau des Falkenstein, were not written by her but by her husband."

She wrote approximately twenty novels and sixty stories, as well as poems, theoretical tracts and cultural historical essays; there were also romances and comedies. She sought anonymity for some of her work by referring to herself as "author of the Roderich novels", or using the pseudonym "Serena".

Drei Mährchen (1806), Feodora (1814), Frauenliebe (1818) and Die graue Maske (1829) are some of her works with Beytrag zur Geschichte der Zeit (1829/30) considered her most important. Her work has been criticized for abandoning her originality in favour of imitating Motte Fouqué's style, hoping to share in his popularity. Her writings continued until 1829 with her last publication, Resignation. She died at Nennhausen in 1831, aged 57. Her letters and short essays were collected after her death under the title "The Writing Table, or Old Times and New" (Cologne, 1833).

== Selected works ==
- 1806, Drei Mährchen (under the pseudonym "Serena")
- 1807, Roderich
- 1810, Die Frau des Falkensteins
- 1811, Briefe über Zweck und Richtung weiblicher Bildung
- 1812, Magie der Natur
- 1812, Briefe über die griechische Mythologie für Frauen
- 1814, Die Spanier und der Freiwillige in Paris
- 1814, Feodora
- 1815, Edmunds Wege und Irrwege
- 1816, Das Heldenmädchen aus der Vendée
- 1818, Frauenliebe
- 1820, Ida
- 1820, Lodoiska und ihre Tochter
- 1821, Die blinde Führerin
- 1821, Heinrich und Maria
- 1821, Briefe über Berlin
- 1822, Vergangenheit und Gegenwart
- 1822, Die Herzogin von Montmorency
- 1823, Die Vertriebenen
- 1824, Neueste gesammelte Erzählungen
- 1825, Bodo von Hohenried
- 1826, Die Frauen in der großen Welt. Bildungsbuch beim Eintritt in das gesellige Leben
- 1829, Resignation
