= Emilie Winkelmann =

Emilie Winkelmann (May 8, 1875 in Aken, Germany - August 1952 Hovedissen near Bielefeld) was the first freelance architect in Germany that ran an independent architecture practice. She also worked in Berlin, Dortmund and Bochum in different architectural offices.

== Early life and studies ==
A daughter of a teacher, Winkelmann learned the trade of a carpenter at a young age in her grandfather's construction business, where she worked on new- or re-construction among other projects. In 1902, even though at that time women in Prussia did not have access to higher education, she was allowed to study at the Technische Hochschule Hannover as a guest student. She financed her degree and her living expenses by working at a drawing office. However, in 1906, she was not allowed to participate in the state examination for architects.

== Career ==
After her failed attempt to participate in the state exam for architects, Winkelmann went to Berlin, where she worked at a construction firm. Then she opened her own office as the first female freelance architect and, over time, employed up to 15 people who were mostly young women. In 1907 she won first place in an architecture competition for a theater building in the Berliner Blumenstraße. After receiving the commission for the theater, which was built in 1908, many wealthy developers reached out with requests for her to design manors and mansions in Berlin, Babelsberg and Schleswig. Built according to her plans for a large urban tenement, the Leistikowhaus, was constructed in Berlin-Charlottenburg between 1909 and 1910. Between 1910 and 1912 she planned and built numerous rural manors in the Province Pommern, amongst others in Wundichow in Kreis Stolp and in Carwitz in Landkreis Dramburg. In Wieck she was commissioned by the von Lepel family for the reconstruction of their mansion, which was later featured in the newspaper Bauwelt in 1912. In 1912 in Klein Kiesow she erected a twelve-axis county estate. At the Wasserschloss Mellenthin she reconstructed the old horse and cattle stables into living and commercial buildings in a contemporary style. Around 1906 in Alt Necheln close to Brüle the new county estate of the Booth family was built.

In 1913 Emilie Winkelmann drafted, on the behalf of the „Genossenschaft für Frauenheimstätten“ the Neu-Babelsberg-Nowawes, the "Haus in der Sonne“ (House in the Sun). This Building, which is situated in present day on the Hermann-Maaß-Str. 18/20 in Babelsberg, was supposed to be a location where independent women, who worked but were going into retirement, could live in a self-sufficient manner. Around 1914, the building was made up of 14 modern apartments with one to three rooms: one small kitchen, bathrooms and a heated recessed balcony. In a few cases they had their own bathroom and central heating. The further construction had to be stopped due to the start of World War I in 1914. The construction was only continued in 1928 under guidance of the architect Friedrich Lüngen. The most notable structures by Emilie Winkelmann include the Viktoria-Studienhaus build between 1914 and 1915 under the patronage of the empress Auguste Viktoria. Today the building is known as Ottilie-von-Hansemann-Haus on the Otto-Suhr-Allee as a historical and architectural monument in Berlin-Charlottenburg. The exterior structure is tailored to assimilate to the 18th century style. It was at the time a unique living and educational institution for Berlin's female students instituted due to the reforming notions of the feminist movement which was gaining momentum in the city at the time.

=== Later life ===
In 1916 Winkelmann began to suffer from hearing loss and disorientation due to a severe chronic hearing ailment. After she opened her own office, she contributed to a traveling exhibition on “Kurland” as well as the House of Friendship, the intended future location of the German-Turkish Institute. Unfortunately her design for the House of Friendship never met fruition, as construction was halted by Germany’s defeat. After World War I, she did not manage to continue her previous success in the industry. The modern aesthetic and construction in the Weimar Republic was not in line with her experiences. Emilie Winkelmann tried to catch up with the developments of the time, in particular with projects surrounding small apartment design. It was not until 1928 that she was accepted into the Association of German Architects (Bund Deutscher Architekten). Since she was neither involved in politics in the 1920s nor in the 1930s, there were no public contracts. The modernization of manor houses and mansions continued to play a major role in her work, but also new buildings, for example in the 1920s she designed Schloss Nieden of Winterfeld near Pasewalk. From 1939 until its destruction in 1945, she worked on the restoration of Schloss Grüntal near Bernau close to Berlin. At the end of the war she was able to stay with one of her clients families on Gut Hovedissen near Bielefeld. There she devoted herself to rebuilding the estate and accommodating refugees and displaced persons until her death in 1952. Emilie Winkelmann was buried in the family grave in Aken. The villas and country houses she drafted are still considered to be exceptionally modern today and are on a par with those of famous architects such as Alfred Messel and Hermann Muthesius.

Many of the buildings designed by her, most of which were adapted to the individual needs of the residents, are now under historic preservation. In Babelsberg, a memorial plaque from the FrauenOrte project in the state of Brandenburg in front of the designed by her "House in the Sun", which today belongs to Bauverein Babelsberg eG, was dedicated to Emilie Winkelmann.

== Selected works ==
The following are all located in Charlottenburg-Wilmersdorf, Berlin:

- Landhaus Presber (1907–08), Trabener Str. 24
- Landhaus (1908), Lindenallee 21
- Leistikowhaus (1909–10), Leistikowstr. 2
- Ottilie-von-Hansemann-Haus (1914–15), Otto-Suhr-Allee 18-20, first the Victoria Studienhaus school, later the Tribüne theatre.[8]
- Wohnhaus (1925–26), Alemannenallee 3

== Literature ==
- Sonia Ricon Baldessani: Wie Frauen bauen. Architektinnen. Von Julia Morgan bis Zaha Hadid. AvivA Verlag, Berlin, 2001., ISBN 3-932338-12-X, pp. 24–33.
- Kerstin Dörhöfer: Pionierinnen in der Architektur. Eine Baugeschichte der Moderne. Wasmuth Verlag, Tübingen 2004, ISBN 3 8030 0639 2
- Jürgen Schröder: Deutschlands erste Architektin. Emilie Winkelmann baute auch in Vorpommern. In: Heimatkurier. Supplement to Nordkurier, 24 July 2006, p. 24.
- Sonia Ricon Baldessani: Wie Frauen bauen. Architektinnen. Von Julia Morgan bis Zaha Hadid. AvivA Verlag, Berlin 2001, ISBN 3-932338-12-X, S. 24–33.
- Kerstin Dörhöfer: Pionierinnen in der Architektur. Eine Baugeschichte der Moderne. Wasmuth Verlag, Tübingen 2004, ISBN 3-8030-0639-2.
- Jürgen Schröder: Deutschlands erste Architektin. Emilie Winkelmann baute auch in Vorpommern. In: Heimatkurier, Beilage zum Nordkurier vom 24. July 2006, S. 24.
- Bettina Schröder-Bornkampf: Winkelmann, Louise Emilie. In: Eva Labouvie (Hrsg.): Frauen in Sachsen-Anhalt, Bd. 2: Ein biographisch-bibliographisches Lexikon vom 19. Jahrhundert bis 1945. Böhlau, Köln u. a. 2019, ISBN 978-3-412-51145-6, S. 442–445.
