= Naturphilosophie =

Current in 19th-century German idealism

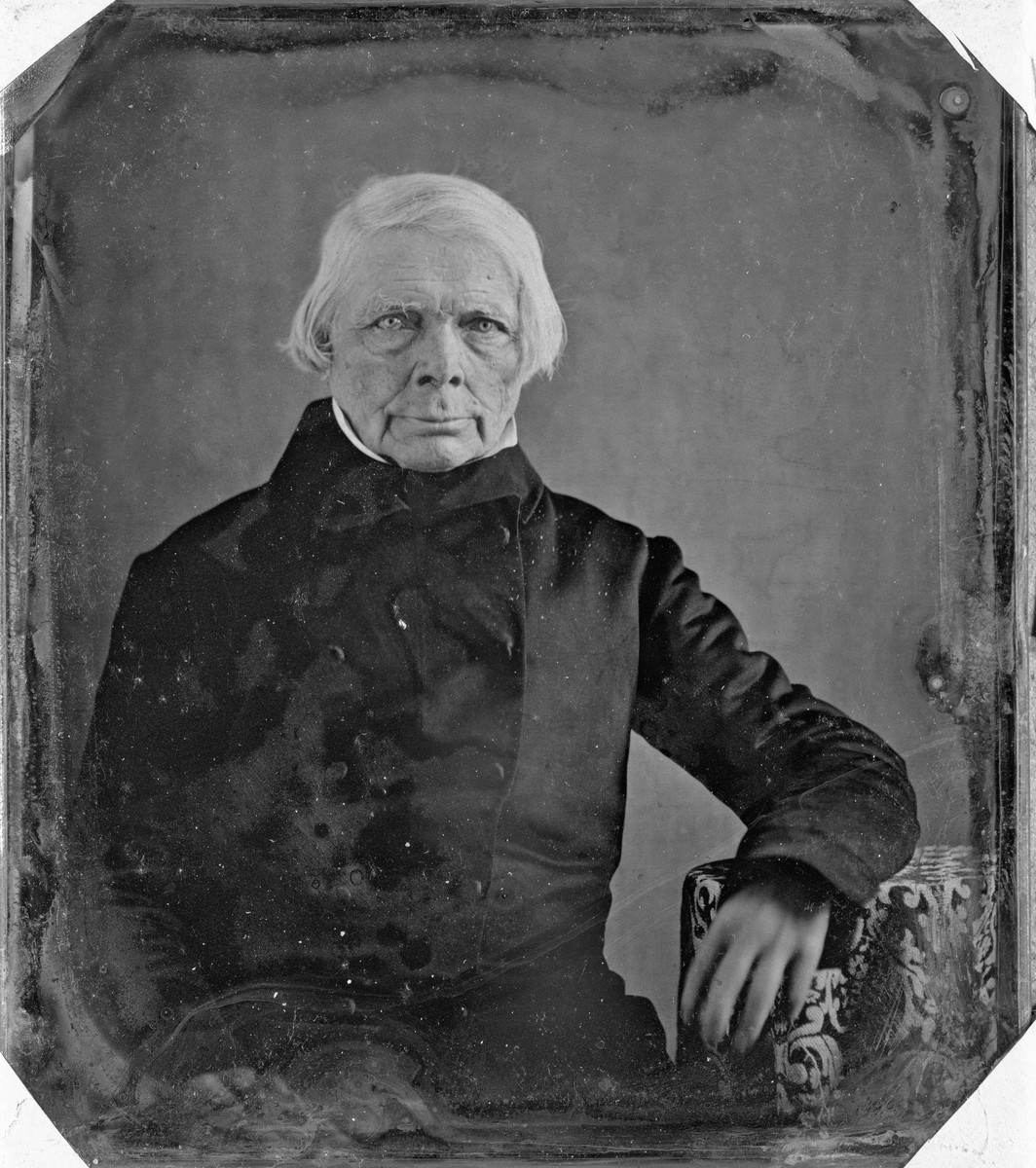
Friedrich Wilhelm Joseph von Schelling (1775–1854), considered the primary figure of Naturphilosophie

"Naturphilosophie" (German for "nature-philosophy") is a term used in English-language philosophy to identify a current in the philosophical tradition of German idealism, as applied to the study of nature in the earlier 19th century. German speakers use the clearer term "Romantische Naturphilosophie", the philosophy of nature developed at the time of the founding of German Romanticism. It is particularly associated with the philosophical work of Friedrich Wilhelm Joseph Schelling and Georg Wilhelm Friedrich Hegel—though it has some clear precursors also. More particularly it is identified with some of the initial works of Schelling during the period 1797–9, in reaction to the views of Johann Gottlieb Fichte, and subsequent developments from Schelling's position. Always controversial, some of Schelling's ideas in this direction are still considered of philosophical interest, even if the subsequent development of experimental natural science had a destructive impact on the credibility of the theories of his followers in Naturphilosophie.

Naturphilosophie attempted to comprehend nature in its totality and to outline its general theoretical structure, thus attempting to lay the foundations for the natural sciences. In developing their theories, the German Naturphilosophen found their inspiration in the natural philosophy of the Ancient Greek Ionian philosophers.

As an approach to philosophy and science, Naturphilosophie has had a difficult reception. In Germany, neo-Kantians came to distrust its developments as speculative and overly metaphysical. For most of the 19th and early 20th centuries, it was poorly understood in Anglophone countries. Over the years, it has been subjected to continuing criticism. Since the 1960s, improved translations have appeared, and scholars have developed a better appreciation of the objectives of Naturphilosophie.

== Development ==
The German idealist philosopher Johann Gottlieb Fichte had attempted to show that the whole structure of reality follows necessarily from the fact of self-consciousness. Schelling took Fichte's position as his starting-point, and in his earliest writings posited that nature must have reality for itself. In this light Fichte's doctrines appeared incomplete. On the one hand, they identified the ultimate ground of the universe of reason too closely with finite, individual Spirit. On the other, they threatened the reality of the world of nature by seeing it too much in the manner of subjective idealism. Fichte, in this view, had not managed to unite his system with the aesthetical and teleological view of nature to which Immanuel Kant's Critique of Judgment had pointed.

Naturphilosophie is therefore one possible theory of the unity of nature. Nature as the sum of what is objective, and intelligence as the complex of all the activities making up self-consciousness, appear as equally real. The philosophy of nature and transcendental idealism would be the two complementary portions making up philosophy as a whole.

== German philosophy ==
Naturphilosophie translated into English would mean "philosophy of nature", and its scope began to be taken in a broad way. Johann Gottfried Herder, particularly taken in opposition to Immanuel Kant, was a precursor of Schelling:

Herder's dynamic view of nature was developed by Goethe and Schelling and led to the tradition of Naturphilosophie [...]

Later Friedrich Schlegel theorised about a particular German strand in philosophy of nature, citing Jakob Böhme, Johannes Kepler and Georg Ernst Stahl, with Jan Baptist van Helmont as an edge case. Frederick Beiser instead traces Naturphilosophie as developed by Schelling, Hegel, Schlegel and Novalis to a crux in the theory of matter, and identifies the origins of the line they took with the vis viva theory of matter in the work of Gottfried Leibniz.

Subsequently Schelling identified himself with Baruch Spinoza, to whose thought he saw himself as approaching. The Darstellung meines Systems, and the expanded treatment in the lectures on a System der gesamten Philosophie und der Naturphilosophie insbesondere given in Würzburg in 1804, contain elements of Spinoza's philosophy.

== Schelling ==
In a short space of time Schelling produced three works: Ideen zu einer Philosophie der Natur als Einleitung in das Studium dieser Wissenschaft, 1797 (Ideas for a Philosophy of Nature as Introduction to the Study of this Science); Von der Weltseele, 1798 (On the World Soul); and Erster Entwurf eines Systems der Naturphilosophie, 1799 (First Plan of a System of the Philosophy of Nature). As criticism of scientific procedure, these writings retain a relevance. Historically, according to Richards:

Despite the tentativeness of their titles, these monographs introduced radical interpretations of nature that would reverberate through the sciences, and particularly the biology, of the next century. They developed the fundamental doctrines of Naturphilosophie.

In System des transzendentalen Idealismus, 1800 (System of Transcendental Idealism), Schelling included ideas on matter and the organic in Part III. They form just part of a more ambitious work that takes up other themes, in particular aesthetics. From this point onwards Naturphilosophie was less of a research concern for him, as he reformulated his philosophy. However, it remained an influential aspect of his teaching. For a short while, he edited a journal, the Neue Zeitschrift für speculative Physik (bound volume 1802).

Schelling's Naturphilosophie was a way in which he worked himself out of the tutelage of Fichte, with whom he quarrelled decisively towards the end of the 1790s. More than that, however, it brought him within the orbit of Johann Wolfgang von Goethe, both intellectually and (as a direct consequence of Goethe's sympathetic attitude) by a relocation; and it broke with basic Kantian tenets. Iain Hamilton Grant writes:

Schelling's postkantian confrontation with nature itself begins with the overthrow of the Copernican revolution [...]

Schelling held that the divisions imposed on nature, by our ordinary perception and thought, do not have absolute validity. They should be interpreted as the outcome of the single formative energy which is the soul or inner aspect of nature. In other words he was a proponent of a variety of organicism. The dynamic series of stages in nature, the forms in which the ideal structure of nature is realized, are matter, as the equilibrium of the fundamental expansive and contractive forces; light, with its subordinate processes (magnetism, electricity, and chemical action); organism, with its component phases of reproduction, irritability and sensibility. The continual change presented to us by experience, taken together with the thought of unity in productive force of nature, leads to the conception of the duality through which nature expresses itself in its varied products.

In the introduction to the Ideen he argues against dogmatism, in the terms that a dogmatist cannot explain the organic; and that recourse to the idea of a cosmic creator is a feature of dogmatic systems imposed by the need to explain nature as purposive and unified. Fichte's system, called the Wissenschaftslehre, had begun with a fundamental distinction between dogmatism (fatalistic) and criticism (free), as his formulation of idealism.

Beiser divides up the mature form of Schelling's Naturphilosophie into the attitudes of:

1. transcendental realism: the thesis that "nature exists independent of all consciousness, even that of the transcendental subject" (in Kantian terminology—Critique of Pure Reason—the transcendental subject is the condition of possibility of experience), and
2. transcendental naturalism: the thesis that "everything is explicable according to the laws of nature, including the rationality of the transcendental subject".

Beiser notes how Naturphilosophie was first a counterbalance to Wissenschaftslehre, and then in Schelling's approach became the senior partner. After that, it was hardly to be avoided that Schelling would become an opponent of Fichte, having been a close follower in the early 1790s.

We are able to apprehend and represent nature to ourselves in the successive forms which its development assumes, since it is the same spirit of which we become aware in self-consciousness, though here unconsciously. The variety of its forms is not imposed on it externally, since there is no external teleology in nature. Nature is a self-forming whole, within which only natural explanations can be sought. The function of Naturphilosophie is to exhibit the ideal as springing from the real, not to deduce the real from the ideal.

== Influence and critics of Naturphilosophie ==
Criticism of Naturphilosophie has been widespread, over two centuries. Schelling's theories, however influential in terms of the general culture of the time, have not survived in scientific terms. Like other strands of speculation in the life sciences, in particular, such as vitalism, they retreated in the face of experiment, and then were written out of the history of science as Whig history. But critics were initially not scientists (a term not used until later); rather they came largely from within philosophy and Romantic science, a community including many physicians. Typically, the retrospective views of scientists of the 19th century on "Romantic science" in general erased distinctions:

Scientific criticism in the nineteenth century took hardly any notice of the distinctions between Romantic, speculative and transcendental, scientific and aesthetic directions.

One outspoken critic was the chemist Justus von Liebig, who compared Naturphilosophie with the Black Death. Another critic, the physiologist Emil du Bois-Reymond, frequently dismissed Naturphilosophie as "bogus".

=== Role in aesthetics ===
Isaiah Berlin summed up the reasons why Naturphilosophie had a wide-ranging impact on views of art and artists:

if everything in nature is living, and if we ourselves are simply its most self-conscious representatives, the function of the artist is to delve within himself, and above all to delve within the dark and unconscious forces which move within him, and to bring these to consciousness by the most agonising and violent internal struggle.

=== Contemporaneous criticism ===
Fichte was very critical of the opposition set up in Schelling's Naturphilosophie to his own conception of Wissenschaftslehre. In that debate, Hegel then intervened, largely supporting his student friend Schelling, with the work usually called his Differenzschrift, the Differenz des Fichteschen und Schellingschen Systems der Philosophie (The Difference Between Fichte's and Schelling's System of Philosophy); a key publication in his own philosophical development, his first book, it was published in September 1801.

Schelling's Absolute was left with no other function than that of removing all the differences which give form to thought. The criticisms of Fichte, and more particularly of Hegel (in the Preface to the Phenomenology of Spirit), pointed to a defect in the conception of the Absolute as mere featureless identity. It was ridiculed by Hegel as "the night in which all cows are black."

=== Other views in Romantic science ===
Ignaz Paul Vitalis Troxler, a follower of Schelling, later broke with him. He came to the view that the Absolute in nature and mind is beyond the intellect and reason.

== Naturphilosophen ==
- Adolph Carl August von Eschenmayer, engaged in controversy with Schelling from 1801, published Grundriss der Natur-Philosophie in 1832
- Carl Friedrich Kielmeyer, an influence on Schelling's thinking, he was a founder rather than a follower, and a proponent of recapitulation theory
- Johann Friedrich Meckel
- Lorenz Oken
- Hans Christian Ørsted
- Johann Wilhelm Ritter
- Henrik Steffens
- August Ludwig Hülsen
- Gottfried Reinhold Treviranus
- Karl Joseph Hieronymus Windischmann

== See also ==
- Dialectics of Nature
