= Nennhausen (Amt) =

- Amt
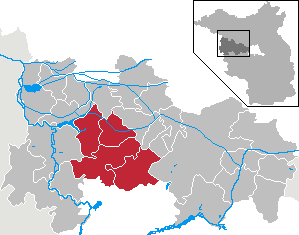
- Map of Havelland highlighting Nennhausen
- Interactive map of Nennhausen
- Location within Germany Location within Brandenburg
- Coordinates: 52°36′N 12°30′E
- Country: Germany
- State: Brandenburg
- District: Havelland
- Seat: Nennhausen
- Subdivisions: 4 municipalities

Area
  - Total: 255.31 km^{2} (98.58 sq mi)

Population (2025-12-31)
  - Total: 4,623
  - Density: 18.11/km^{2} (46.90/sq mi)
- Time zone: UTC+01:00 (CET)
  - Summer (DST): UTC+02:00 (CEST)
- Website: www.amt-nennhausen.de

Amt Nennhausen is an Amt ("collective municipality") in the district of Havelland, in Brandenburg, Germany. Its seat is in Nennhausen.

The Amt Nennhausen consists of the following municipalities:

1. Kotzen
2. Märkisch Luch
3. Nennhausen
4. Stechow-Ferchesar

== Demography ==
Development of Population since 1875 within the Current Boundaries (Blue Line: Population; Dotted Line: Comparison to Population Development of Brandenburg state; Grey Background: Time of Nazi rule; Red Background: Time of Communist rule)

Recent Population Development and Projections (Population Development before Census 2011 (blue line); Recent Population Development according to the Census in Germany in 2011 (blue bordered line); Official projections for 2005-2030 (yellow line); for 2017-2030 (scarlet line); for 2020-2030 (green line)

Amt Nennhausen: Population development
within the current boundaries (2025)

| Year | Pop. | ±% p.a. |
|---|---|---|
| 1875 | 6,338 | — |
| 1890 | 6,379 | +0.04% |
| 1910 | 6,319 | −0.05% |
| 1925 | 6,963 | +0.65% |
| 1933 | 6,439 | −0.97% |
| 1939 | 6,272 | −0.44% |
| 1946 | 9,261 | +5.73% |
| 1950 | 9,325 | +0.17% |
| 1964 | 6,674 | −2.36% |
| 1971 | 6,459 | −0.47% |

| Year | Pop. | ±% p.a. |
|---|---|---|
| 1981 | 5,483 | −1.62% |
| 1985 | 5,411 | −0.33% |
| 1990 | 5,182 | −0.86% |
| 1995 | 4,944 | −0.94% |
| 2000 | 5,040 | +0.39% |
| 2005 | 4,973 | −0.27% |
| 2010 | 4,767 | −0.84% |
| 2015 | 4,632 | −0.57% |
| 2020 | 4,573 | −0.26% |
| 2025 | 4,623 | +0.22% |
