= Freie Erde =

East German newspaper (1946–1947)

- Type: Daily newspaper
- Format: Broadsheet
- Owner: Socialist Unity Party of Germany
- Founded: 1952
- Ceased publication: 1990
- Political alignment: Communist
- Language: German
- Headquarters: Neubrandenburg
- Country: German Democratic Republic
- ISSN: 0427-5187
- OCLC number: 724281908

Freie Erde (German: Free Earth) was a German-language daily newspaper published in the German Democratic Republic. Its title was changed to Nordkurier following the unification in 1990.

== History and profile ==
Freie Erde was established in 1952 as one of the newspapers published in the German Democratic Republic. The paper was the organ of the provincial branch of the Socialist Unity Party of Germany. Although it was originally started to serve for Neubrandenburg, it was first published in Neustrelitz, and in April 1974 its headquarters moved to Neubrandenburg. As of 1959 the paper had editions in fourteen smalls towns in the Berlin area.

Freie Erde was published in broadsheet format and consisted of eight pages.

Following the unification of Germany the paper ceased publication in 1990 and was renamed as Nordkurier which was owned by Kurierverlag GmbH in 2009.

== See also ==
- List of German newspapers
