= Jena Romanticism =

German philosophical and literary movement

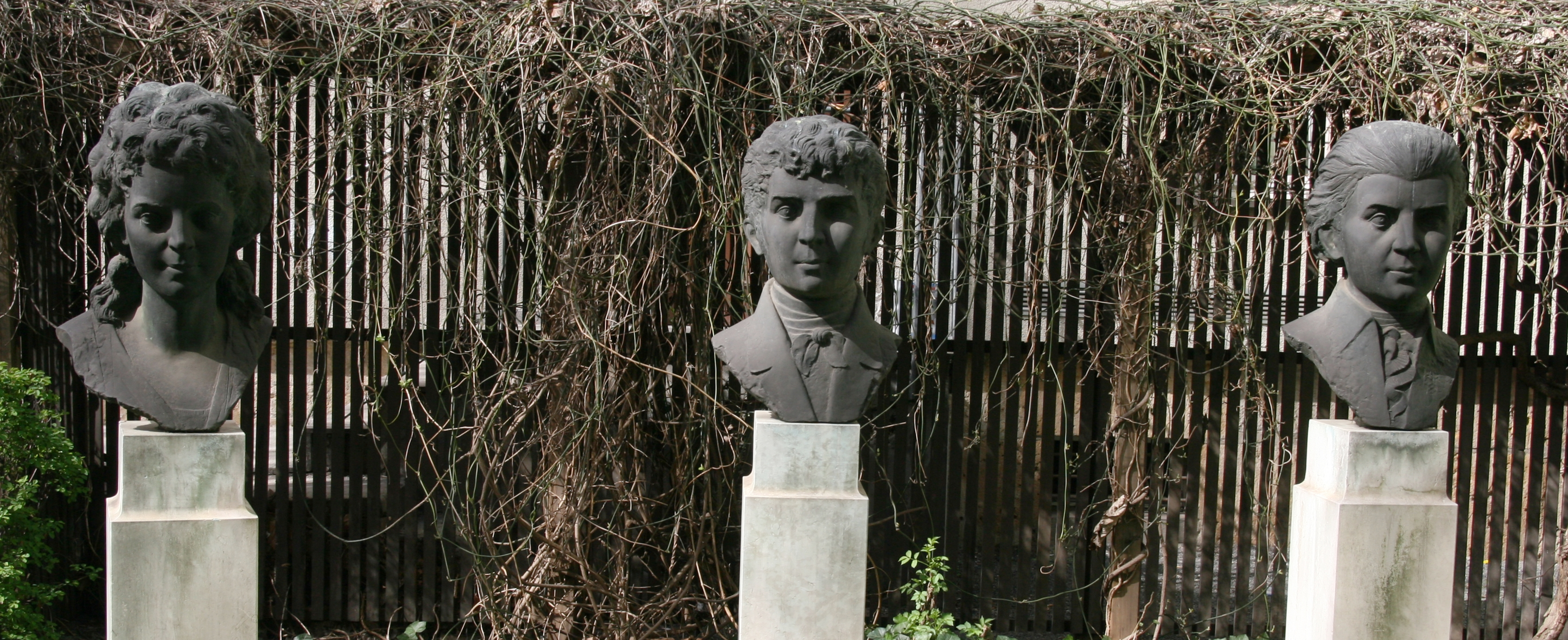
The busts of Caroline Schlegel, August Wilhelm Schlegel, and Friedrich Schlegel in front of the Romantic House Museum in Jena

Jena Romanticism (German: Jenaer Romantik), also the Jena Romantics or Early Romanticism (Frühromantik), is the first phase of Romanticism in German literature represented by the work of a group centred in Jena from 1798 to 1803. The movement is considered to have contributed to the development of German idealism in late modern philosophy.

== Overview ==
The group of Jena Romantics was led by Caroline Schlegel, who hosted their meetings. Two members of the group, brothers August Wilhelm and Friedrich von Schlegel, who laid down the theoretical basis for Romanticism in the circle's organ, the Athenaeum (established in May 1798), maintained that the first duty of criticism was to understand and appreciate the right of genius to follow its natural bent.

The greatest imaginative achievement of this circle is to be found in the lyrics and two fragmentary novels by Georg Philipp Friedrich Freiherr von Hardenberg, better known by his pseudonym "Novalis". The works of Johann Gottlieb Fichte and Friedrich Wilhelm Joseph Schelling expounded the Romantic doctrine in philosophy, whereas the theologian Friedrich Schleiermacher demonstrated the necessity of individualism in religious thought. Other notable representatives of the movement include August Ludwig Hülsen and Friedrich Hölderlin.

By May 1803, the circle in Jena had dispersed. A second phase of Romanticism was initiated two years later in Heidelberg with Heidelberg Romanticism and in Berlin with Berlin Romanticism.

== See also ==
- Absolute idealism
- Romantic hermeneutics
- Sturm und Drang
- Weimar Classicism
