= Nordkurier =

Newspaper in Germany

- Format: Broadsheet
- Publisher: Kurierverlags GmbH & Co KG
- Founded: 2 April 1990; 36 years ago
- Language: German
- Headquarters: Neubrandenburg
- Country: Germany
- ISSN: 0232-1491
- OCLC number: 832578087
- Website: Nordkurier

Nordkurier is a newspaper published in Neubrandenburg, Germany. The paper is the continuation of Freie Erde which was published in the German Democratic Republic.

== History and profile ==
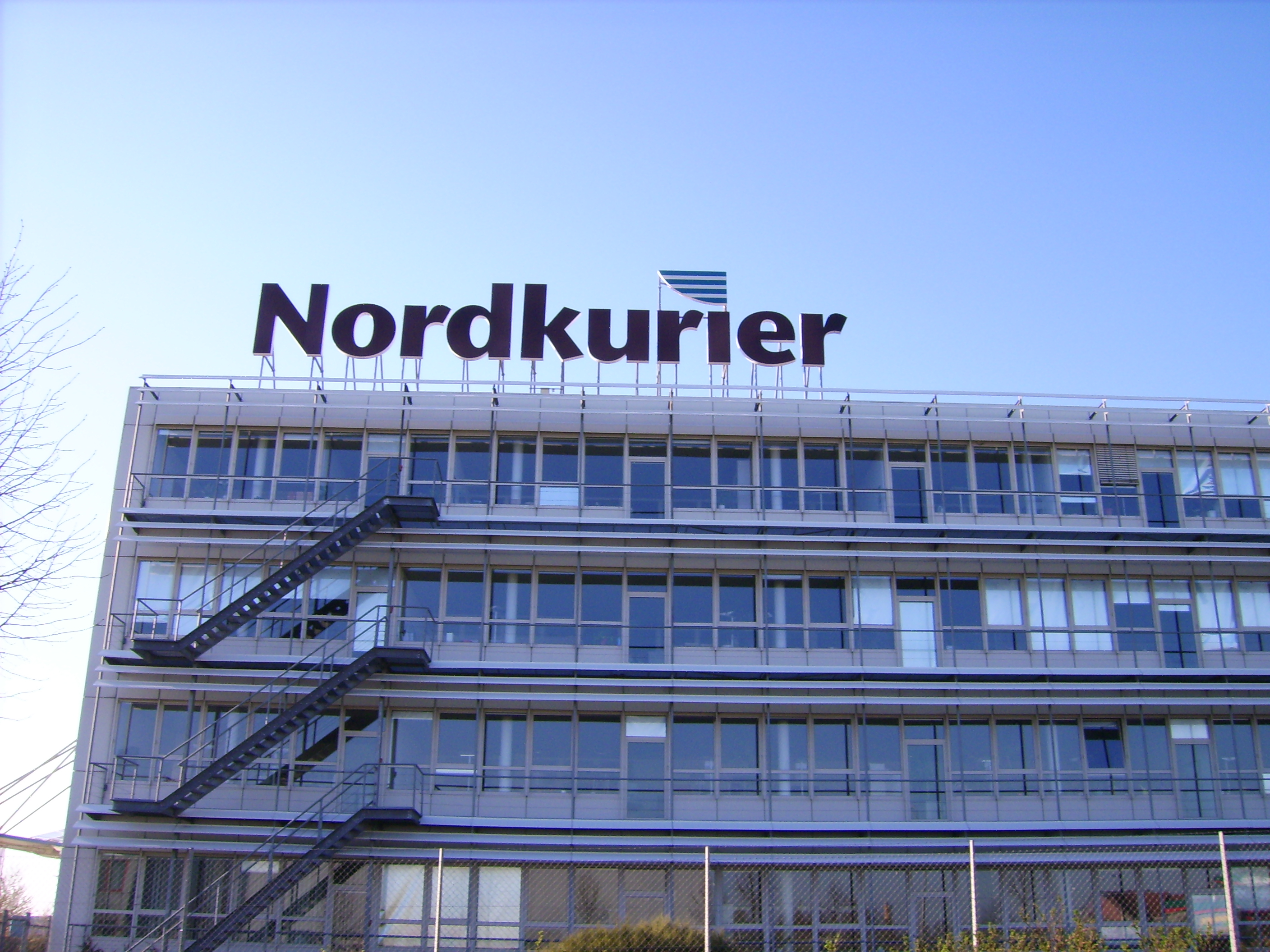
Nordkurier publishing house in Neubrandenburg

Nordkurier was first published on 2 April 1990 as the successor of Freie Erde. The paper is published by Kurierverlags GmbH & Co KG from Mondays to Saturdays. The headquarters of the paper is in Neubrandenburg. It has 14 editions which are distributed in east Mecklenburg, the southern regions of West Pomerania and in Uckermark, north Brandenburg.
