= Märkisch Luch =

- Municipality
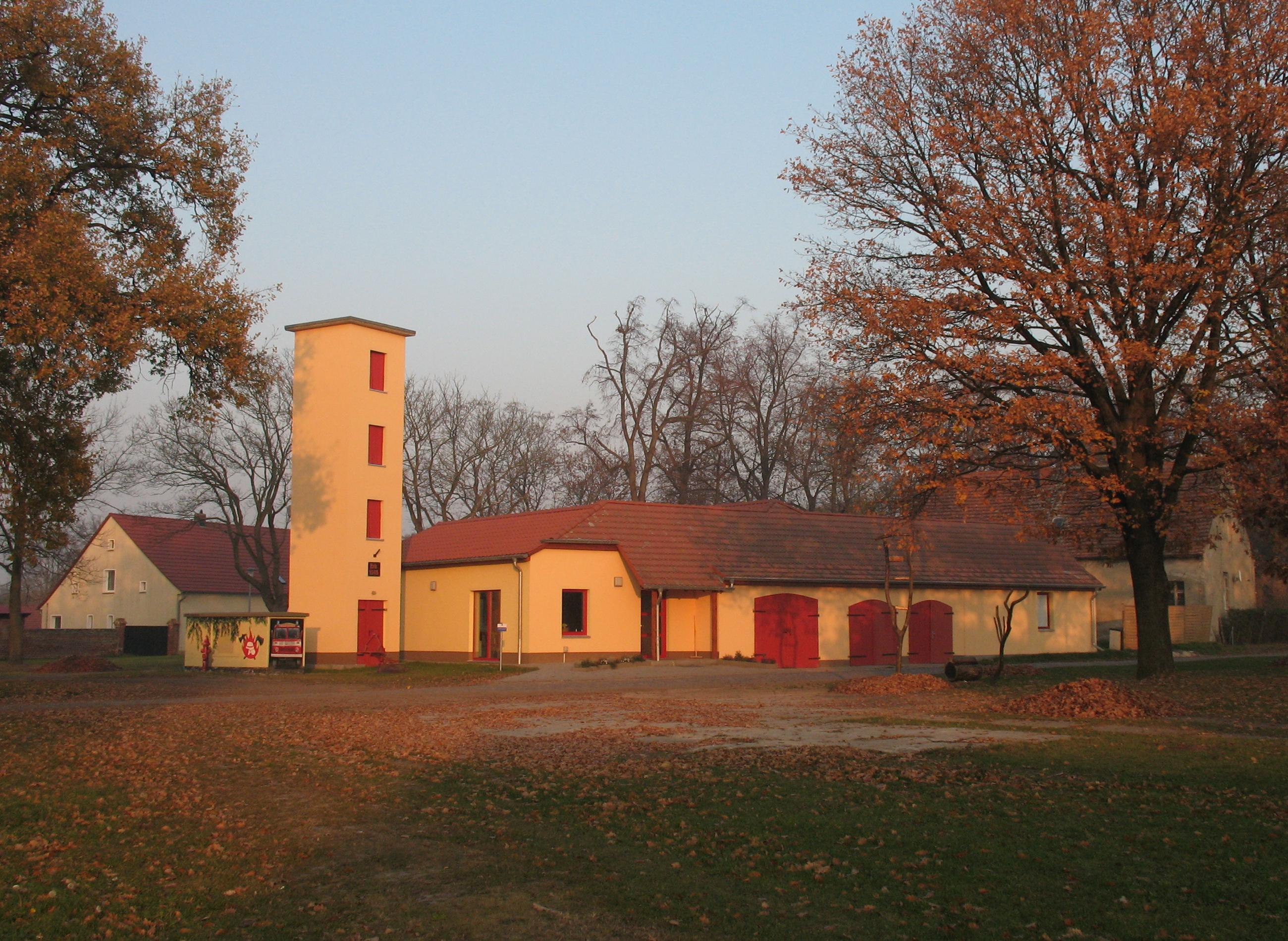
- Fire station in Garlitz

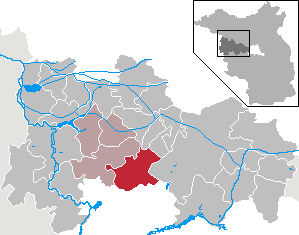
- Location of Märkisch Luch within Havelland district
- Interactive map of Märkisch Luch
- Location within Germany Location within Brandenburg
- Coordinates: 52°34′00″N 12°37′00″E
- Country: Germany
- State: Brandenburg
- District: Havelland
- Municipal assoc.: Nennhausen
- Subdivisions: 6 Ortsteile

Government
  - Mayor (2024–29): Volker Schönfeld

Area
  - Total: 71.02 km^{2} (27.42 sq mi)
- Elevation: 32 m (105 ft)

Population (2025-12-31)
  - Total: 1,337
  - Density: 18.83/km^{2} (48.76/sq mi)
- Time zone: UTC+01:00 (CET)
  - Summer (DST): UTC+02:00 (CEST)
- Postal codes: 14715
- Dialling codes: 033876
- Vehicle registration: HVL
- Website: www.amt-nennhausen.de

Märkisch Luch is a municipality in the Havelland district, in Brandenburg, Germany.

== Demography ==
Development of population since 1875 within the current boundaries (Blue line: Population; Dotted line: Comparison to population development of Brandenburg state; Grey background: Time of Nazi rule; Red background: Time of communist rule)

Märkisch Luch: Population development
within the current boundaries (2013)

Year	Pop.	±% p.a.
1875	2,049	—
1890	2,084	+0.11%
1910	2,091	+0.02%
1925	2,240	+0.46%
1933	2,181	−0.33%
1939	2,027	−1.21%
1946	3,016	+5.84%
1950	3,004	−0.10%
1964	2,051	−2.69%
1971	1,883	−1.21%
1981	1,528	−2.07%
1985	1,506	−0.36%
1989	1,447	−0.99%
1990	1,431	−1.11%
1991	1,385	−3.21%
1992	1,377	−0.58%
1993	1,381	+0.29%
1994	1,390	+0.65%
1995	1,371	−1.37%
1996	1,344	−1.97%
1997	1,315	−2.16%

Year	Pop.	±% p.a.
1998	1,330	+1.14%
1999	1,346	+1.20%
2000	1,342	−0.30%
2001	1,369	+2.01%
2002	1,377	+0.58%
2003	1,376	−0.07%
2004	1,373	−0.22%
2005	1,354	−1.38%
2006	1,382	+2.07%
2007	1,370	−0.87%
2008	1,361	−0.66%
2009	1,334	−1.98%
2010	1,330	−0.30%
2011	1,287	−3.23%
2012	1,254	−2.56%
2013	1,258	+0.32%
2014	1,279	+1.67%
2015	1,251	−2.19%
2016	1,267	+1.28%
2017	1,249	−1.42%
2018	1,283	+2.72%
