= Stechow-Ferchesar =

- Municipality
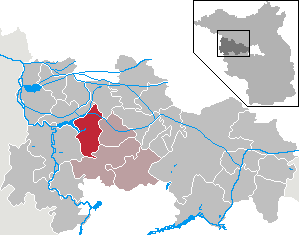
- Location of Stechow-Ferchesar within Havelland district
- Interactive map of Stechow-Ferchesar
- Location within Germany Location within Brandenburg
- Coordinates: 52°39′N 12°27′E
- Country: Germany
- State: Brandenburg
- District: Havelland
- Municipal assoc.: Nennhausen
- Subdivisions: 3 Ortsteile

Government
  - Mayor (2024–29): Michael Spieck

Area
  - Total: 51.05 km^{2} (19.71 sq mi)
- Elevation: 35 m (115 ft)

Population (2025-12-31)
  - Total: 872
  - Density: 17.1/km^{2} (44.2/sq mi)
- Time zone: UTC+01:00 (CET)
  - Summer (DST): UTC+02:00 (CEST)
- Postal codes: 14715
- Dialling codes: 033874
- Vehicle registration: HVL

Stechow-Ferchesar is a municipality in the Havelland district, in Brandenburg, Germany.

== Demography ==
Development of population since 1875 within the current boundaries (Blue line: Population; Dotted line: Comparison to population development of Brandenburg state; Grey background: Time of Nazi rule; Red background: Time of communist rule)

Stechow-Ferchesar: Population development
within the current boundaries (2013)

Year	Pop.	±% p.a.
1875	870	—
1890	850	−0.15%
1910	842	−0.05%
1925	945	+0.77%
1933	861	−1.16%
1939	900	+0.74%
1946	1,277	+5.13%
1950	1,197	−1.60%
1964	891	−2.09%
1971	834	−0.94%
1981	793	−0.50%
1985	808	+0.47%
1989	794	−0.44%
1990	790	−0.50%
1991	771	−2.41%
1992	743	−3.63%
1993	748	+0.67%
1994	776	+3.74%
1995	789	+1.68%
1996	789	+0.00%

Year	Pop.	±% p.a.
1997	815	+3.30%
1998	852	+4.54%
1999	867	+1.76%
2000	893	+3.00%
2001	892	−0.11%
2002	911	+2.13%
2003	922	+1.21%
2004	940	+1.95%
2005	939	−0.11%
2006	928	−1.17%
2007	935	+0.75%
2008	935	+0.00%
2009	940	+0.53%
2010	916	−2.55%
2011	904	−1.31%
2012	894	−1.11%
2013	877	−1.90%
2014	883	+0.68%
2015	895	+1.36%
2016	911	+1.79%
