= Nennhausen =

- Municipality
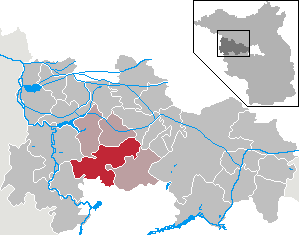
- Location of Nennhausen within Havelland district
- Interactive map of Nennhausen
- Location within Germany Location within Brandenburg
- Coordinates: 52°36′N 12°30′E
- Country: Germany
- State: Brandenburg
- District: Havelland
- Municipal assoc.: Nennhausen
- Subdivisions: 6 Ortsteile

Government
  - Mayor (2024–29): Nadine Trägenap

Area
  - Total: 88.86 km^{2} (34.31 sq mi)
- Elevation: 35 m (115 ft)

Population (2025-12-31)
  - Total: 1,765
  - Density: 19.86/km^{2} (51.44/sq mi)
- Time zone: UTC+01:00 (CET)
  - Summer (DST): UTC+02:00 (CEST)
- Postal codes: 14715
- Dialling codes: 033878
- Vehicle registration: HVL
- Website: www.nennhausen.de

Nennhausen is a municipality in the Havelland district, in Brandenburg, Germany. It consists of the Ortsteile (villages) Bamme, Buckow, Damme, Gräningen, Liepe and Mützlitz.

== Demography ==
Development of population since 1875 within the current boundaries (Blue line: Population; Dotted line: Comparison to population development of Brandenburg state; Grey background: Time of Nazi rule; Red background: Time of communist rule)

Nennhausen: Population development
within the current boundaries (2013)

Year	Pop.	±% p.a.
1875	2,454	—
1890	2,494	+0.11%
1910	2,462	−0.06%
1925	2,776	+0.80%
1933	2,519	−1.21%
1939	2,531	+0.08%
1946	3,616	+5.23%
1950	3,756	+0.95%
1964	2,779	−2.13%
1971	2,792	+0.07%
1981	2,399	−1.51%
1985	2,299	−1.06%
1989	2,287	−0.13%
1990	2,237	−2.19%
1991	2,196	−1.83%
1992	2,154	−1.91%
1993	2,161	+0.32%
1994	2,165	+0.19%
1995	2,134	−1.43%
1996	2,096	−1.78%

Year	Pop.	±% p.a.
1997	2,047	−2.34%
1998	2,079	+1.56%
1999	2,083	+0.19%
2000	2,165	+3.94%
2001	2,150	−0.69%
2002	2,138	−0.56%
2003	2,119	−0.89%
2004	2,073	−2.17%
2005	2,029	−2.12%
2006	2,018	−0.54%
2007	1,989	−1.44%
2008	1,941	−2.41%
2009	1,941	+0.00%
2010	1,931	−0.52%
2011	1,927	−0.21%
2012	1,901	−1.35%
2013	1,895	−0.32%
2014	1,871	−1.27%
2015	1,901	+1.60%
2016	1,885	−0.84%

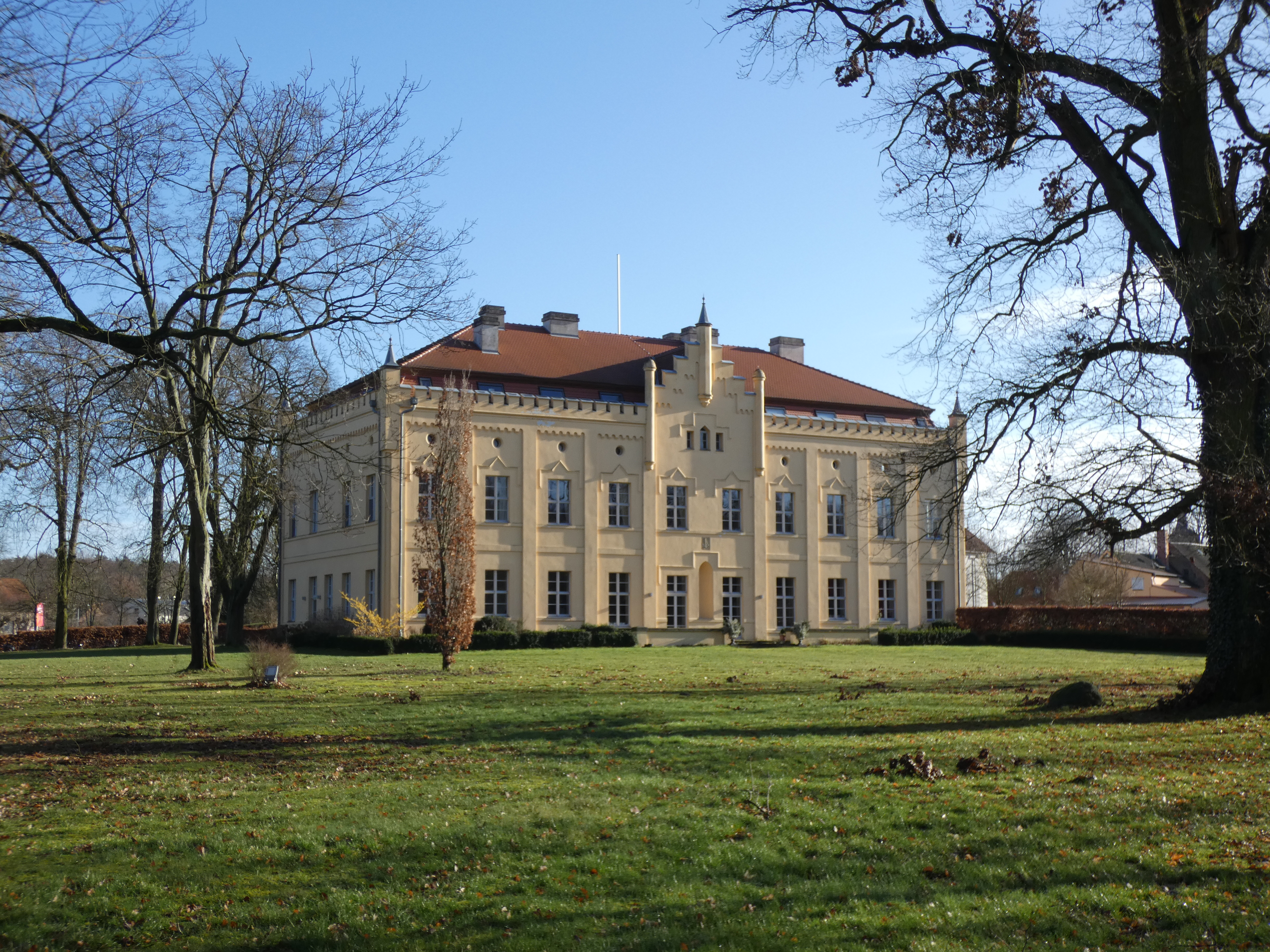
Palace

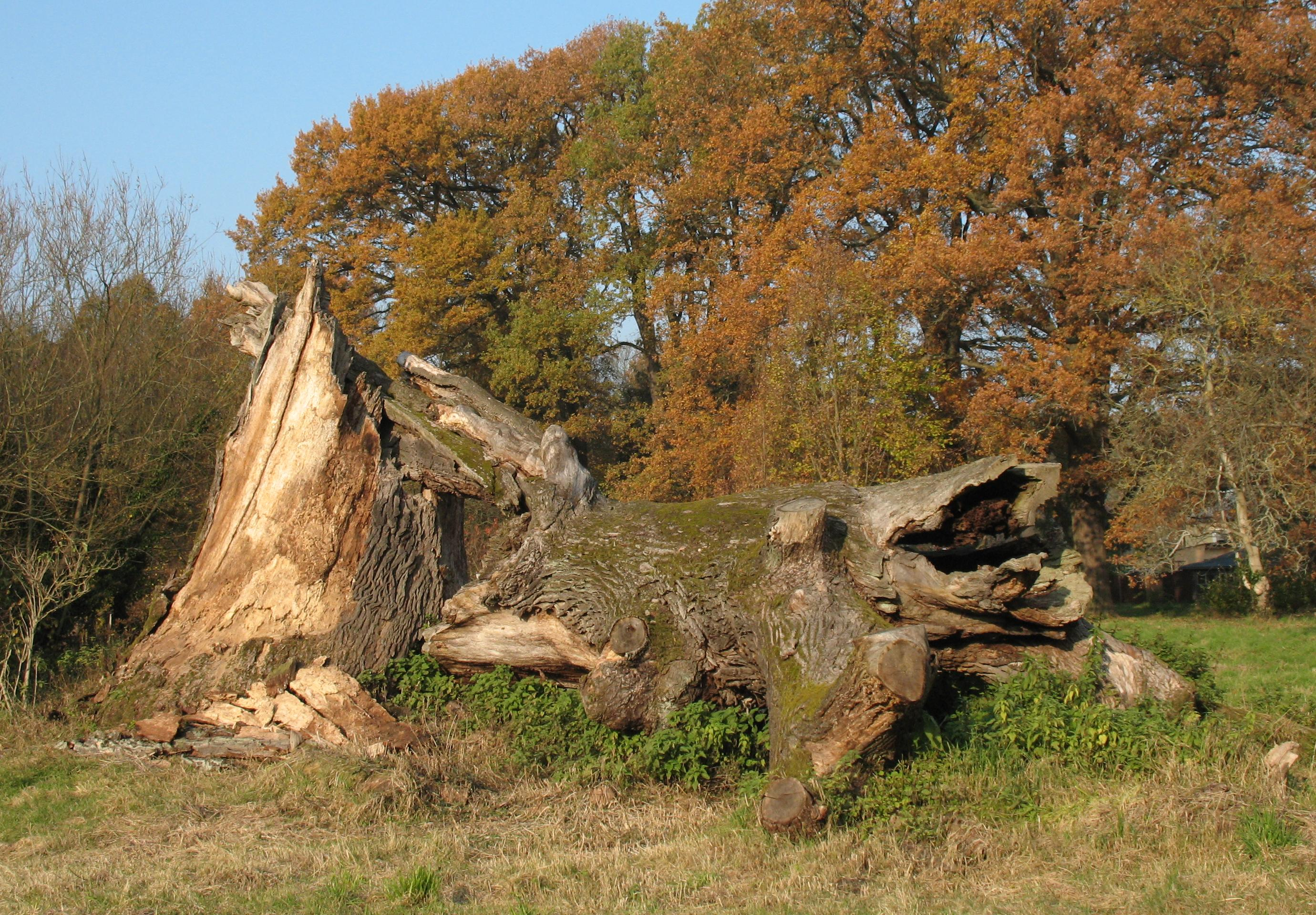
Fouqué Oak

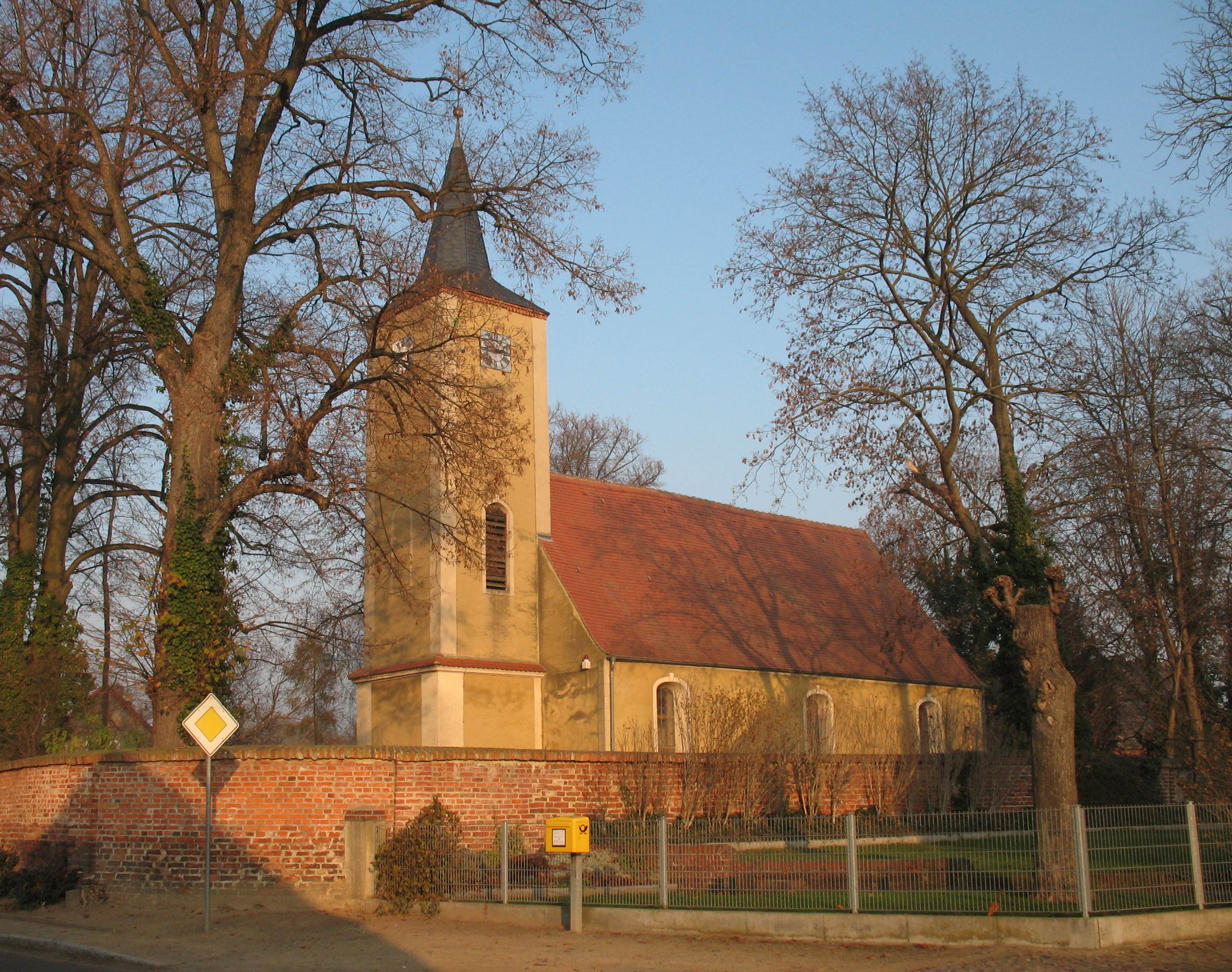
Church
