= Julius Adler =

Julius Adler may refer to:

- Julius Adler (biochemist) (born 1930), American biochemist
- Julius Adler (actor) (1906–1994), Polish-born American Yiddish theater actor
- Julius Ochs Adler (1892–1955), American publisher, journalist, and US Army general
- Julius Adler (politician) (1894–1945), Communist Member of the IV. German Reichstag (Weimar Republic)
