= Georg Wendt =

German politician (1889–1948)

Georg Wendt (23 April 1889 – 11 February 1948) was a German politician and member of the Social Democratic Party (SPD) and Socialist Unity Party (SED).

== Life ==
Wendt was born in Köslin in 1889. After completing Volksschule, Wendt completed an apprenticeship as a glazier and was additionally taught at the Fortbildungsschule. Subsequently, he worked as a glazier's assistant. In 1910 he joined the Social Democratic Party of Germany (SPD) and in 1912 was married. From March 1915 to 1918, Wendt took part in World War I. In 1918, Wendt was obliged to give up his old profession because of medical condition sustained during the war. From then on, he worked as an office worker at the Ortskrankenkasse, starting in 1921 at the district office of Wedding in Mitte, Berlin. After the November Revolution of 1918, Wendt temporarily joined the Independent Social Democratic Party (USPD), a breakaway party composed of left-wing SPD members.

From 1919 to 1920, Wendt was a member of the provincial parliament of Brandenburg. In the years 1921 to 1929 he was also a district and city councillor in Berlin.

Since 1925, he had served as a city councillor-at-large in the Berlin district of Schöneberg, where he belonged to the SPD district council. In the federal election of May 1928, Wendt was elected to the Reichstag as a candidate for the SPD for the electoral district 3 (Potsdam II), a position which he held until the September 1930 election. After a two-year absence from the parliament, Wendt returned to the Reichstag for his old constituency with the Reichstag election in July 1932. From July 1932, Wendt was also party secretary of the SPD for the district of Berlin-Schöneberg.

After the Nazi seizure of power in the spring of 1933, Wendt was arrested and placed in "protective custody" from July to December 1933 in the Brandenburg concentration camp. From 1934 to 1943, Wendt made a living as the owner of a coal business in Berlin-Steglitz. During these years, Wendt and his family were subjected to routine harassment by the Nazi regime, including the removal of their arbour owing to "lack of proper attitude". In these years he was supported by, among others, Paul Löbe and Julius Leber, in whose coal company Wendt occasionally found shelter. In 1944, Wendt reported to the Wehrmacht in order to protect himself against the wave of arrests of politicians from the Weimar Republic launched by the Nazi regime.

After the war, Wendt rejoined the SPD. In 1946, he became a member of the Socialist Unity Party (SED).

== Memorials ==
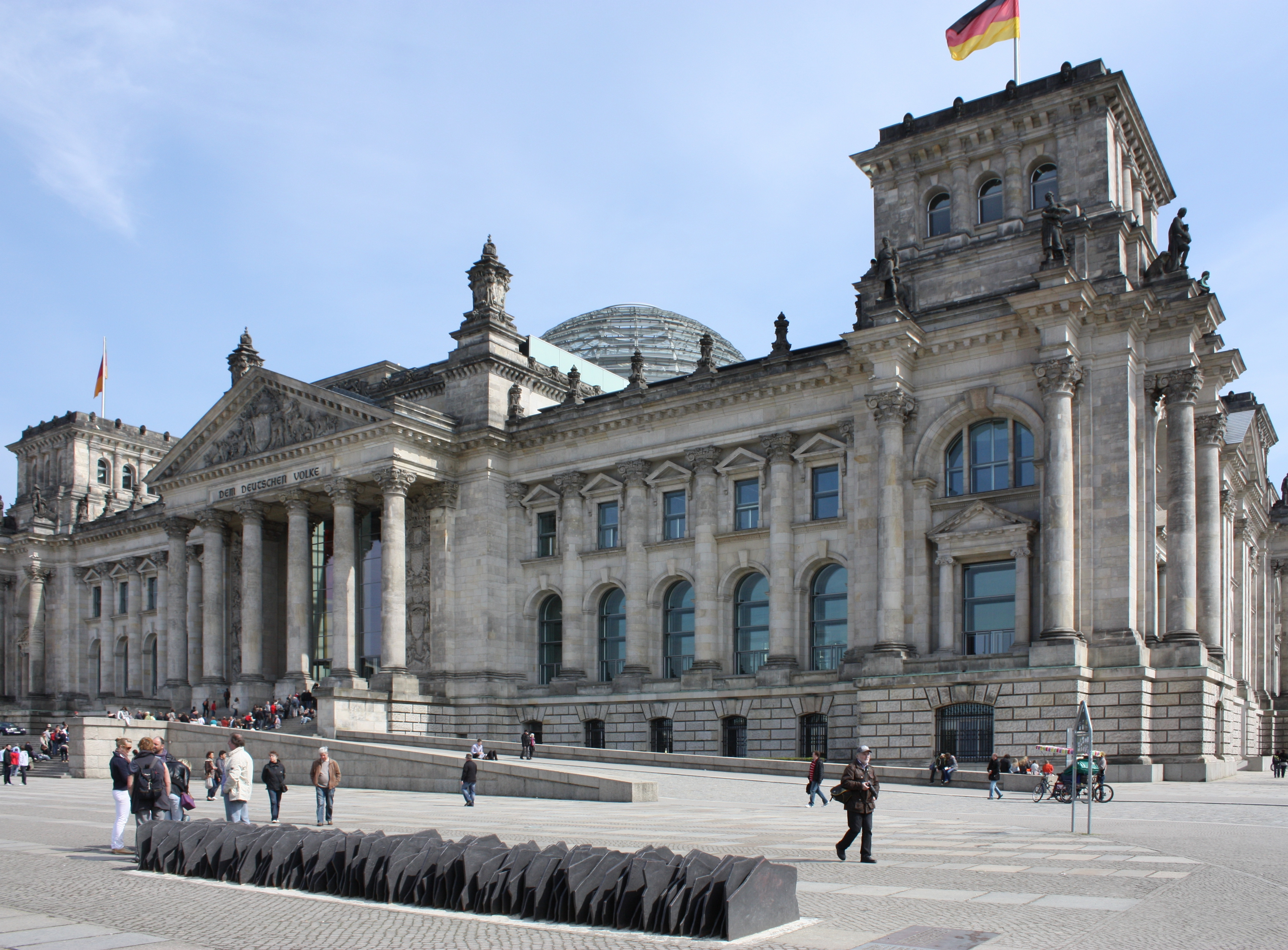
Memorial plaque at the Reichstag

In Berlin since 1992, Wendt's name appears on one of the 96 plaques in the Memorial to the Murdered Members of the Reichstag, on the corner of Scheidemannstraße / Republic Square in Berlin near the Reichstag building.
