= Georg Streiter =

Georg Streiter (14 December 1884 – spring 1945) was a German politician of the German People's Party (DVP).

== Life and work ==
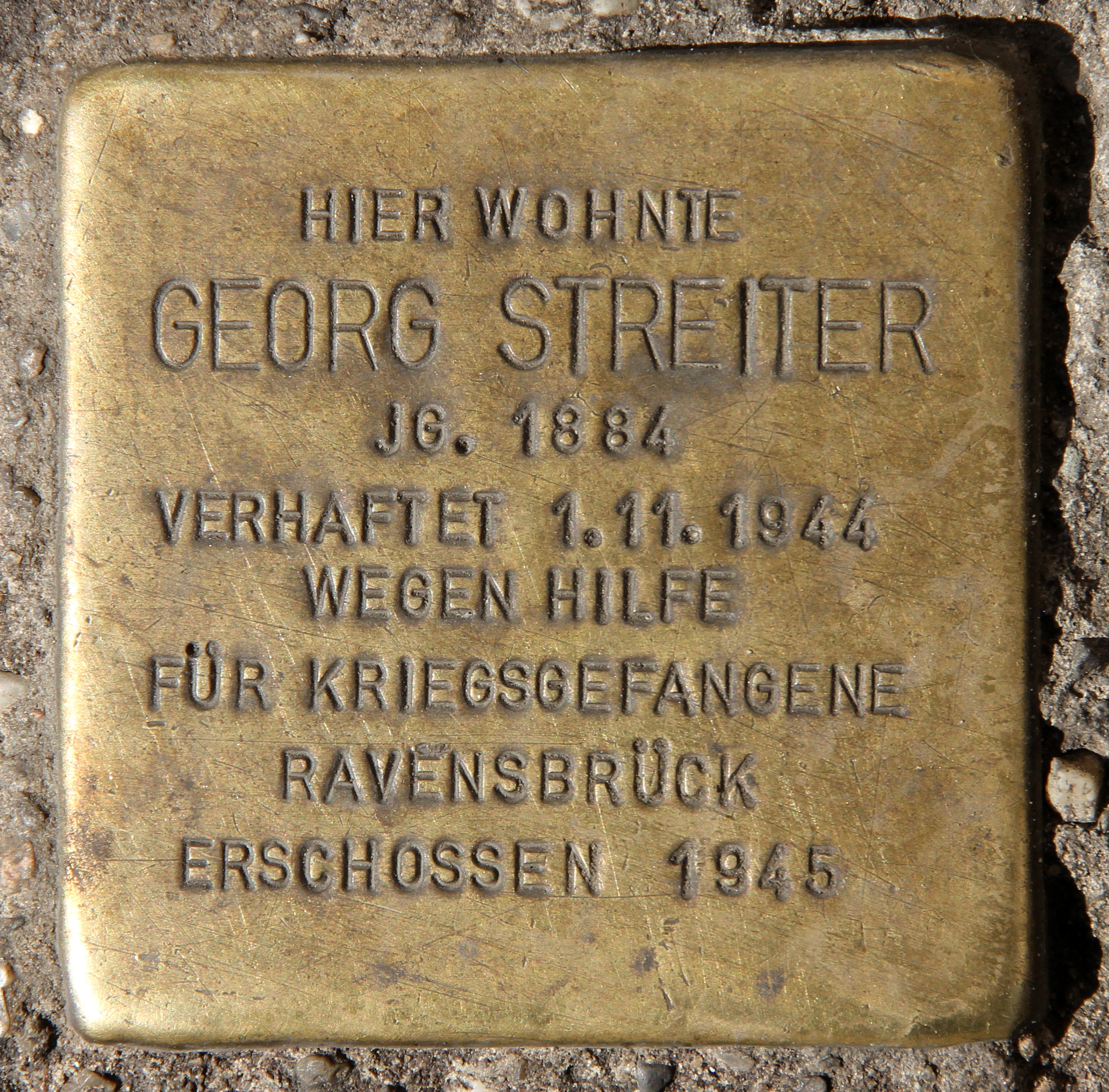
Stolperstein, Schönhauser Allee 130, in Berlin-Prenzlauer Berg

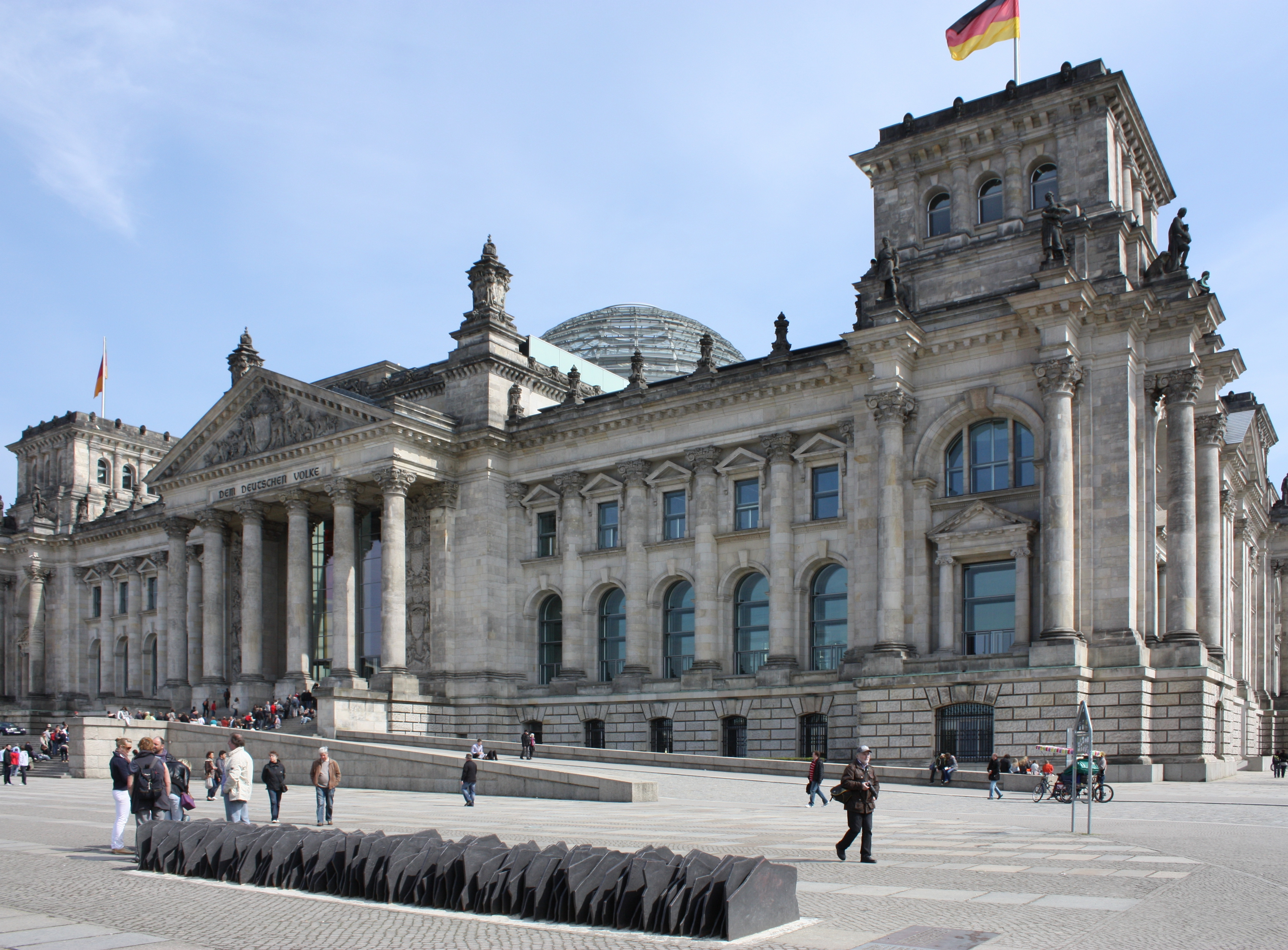
Memorial stone at the Reichstag

=== German Empire (1884 to 1918) ===
Streiter was born in Berlin in 1884, the son of Carl Streiter and Wilhelmine Streiter, née Schulz. After finishing Volksschule he completed an apprenticeship in a textile shop. He later worked as an office assistant and as an orderly in the service of the Inner Mission. In addition, he took courses on theology, economics and linguistics at the Royal School of Art in Berlin.

As a young man, Streiter was already engaged in activism and joined the "Evangelical Youth Union for Social Work" (Evangelischen Jugendbund für soziale Arbeit), a group of young people pursuing the organization of a trade union representing hospital staff organized on Christian principles.

At the founding on 18 October 1903 of the "Union of Orderlies, Nurses, and Allied Professions of Germany" (Gewerkvereins der Krankenpfleger, -Pflegerinnen und verwandter Berufe Deutschlands), Streiter was designated the managing director of the association at the age of 19. In November 1903, Streiter was also the editor-in-chief of the union publication "Der Krankenpfleger" (The Orderly). From 1904 to 1920, Streiter participated as a delegate to the trade union congress "General Association of Christian Trade Unions of Germany" (Gesamtverbandes der christlichen Gewerkschaften Deutschlands) and in October 1906 was appointed as a member of the board of directors of the General Association.

From 1907, Streiter was employed full-time in the union movement: at the general meeting on 13 January 1907, he won the election to succeed Carl Hintsches as chairman of the Union of Orderlies, Nurses, and Allied Professions. He also held the posts of the Secretary and Chief Executive Officer. He therefore became the chief official of the organization, which changed its name to the "German Association of Orderlies and Nurses" (Deutscher Verband der Krankenpfleger und -pflegerinnen). During subsequent general meetings (1909 in Berlin, 1913 in Nuremberg, 1919 in Berlin, 1922 in Würzburg), Streiter was repeatedly reconfirmed in the office of chairman. The membership of the union also increased steadily throughout this time: while in 1907 it counted only 879 members, by 1909 it had already grown to strength of 1,409 members.

Politically, Streiter's association was known to be against socialism and communism, though he justified the use of labour strikes as a bargaining tactic provided that "the people's well-being is not endangered". The "Streiter-Verband," as the association was called owing to Streiter's undisputed leadership, pursued a program of developing the occupation of healthcare workers as a life career. Their aims included improving the economic and social situation of healthcare workers, ensuring regulated education and training, and the inclusion of women within the umbrella organizations of Christian trade unions of which they were a part.

In 1910, Streiter published his later revised book on the state of nursing in Germany, which is the first scientific investigation on the subject of German nursing, and is still frequently cited as a resource on the history of German nursing. At the extraordinary congress of the Christian trade unions in November 1912, Streiter took a firm stand in the so-called "trade union struggle" for the right to organize Christian workers.

During the First World War, Streiter served as a nurse with the Red Cross in Belgium, Poland and Turkey and was decorated with the Iron Cross 2nd Class with White-Black Bands, the Prussian Order of Merit for war aid, the Prussian Red Cross Medal 2nd and 3rd class, and also the Austrian Medal of Honour of the Red Cross.

=== The Nazi period (1933 through 1945) ===
After the dissolution of his association and the integration of the members into the Reichsarbeitsgemeinschaft of public enterprises became Streiter 1933 chiefly employee of the Red Cross. On November 1, 1944, Streiter was arrested in his service on the Red Cross's leadership. The exact reasons for his arrest are not certain, however a letter written by his son in the 1960s indicates that Streiter had been arrested for sending medals to Polish and French prisoners of war. [1] He was detained and taken to Ravensbrück concentration camp. The exact circumstances of his death are not fully understood, though it is presumed however that in the spring of 1945, Streiter was shot in Ravensbrück.

== See also ==
- Memorial to the Murdered Members of the Reichstag
