= Fritz Soldmann =

German politician

Fritz Soldmann (8 March 1878 – 31 May 1945) was a German politician of the Independent Social Democratic Party (USPD) and later the Social Democratic Party (SPD).

== Life and career ==
=== 1878 to 1933 ===
Soldmann was born in Lübeck in 1878, the son of a tailor. After elementary school he trained as a shoemaker. In 1897, after a period as a wandering journeyman, he joined the Social Democratic Party (SPD) and the Free Trade Unions. In 1903 he moved to Schweinfurt and in 1905 became involved in the shoemaker's association there. Between 1905 and 1909 he was chairman of the trade union commission (Gewerkschaftskartell). From 1913 onwards, Soldmann was an employee of the Schweinfurt AOK, and between 1914 and 1933, he was the co-chairman. In 1914 he became a labour secretary (Arbeitersekretär). Between 1915 and 1917 he served as a soldier in World War I. In 1917 following the split within the SPD, he joined the left-wing faction which formed the Independent Social Democratic Party (USPD). Between 1912 and 1919, Soldmann was a municipal planner in Schweinfurt.

During the November Revolution, he was the second chairman of the workers', farmers' and soldiers' council of Bavaria. In April 1919 in Munich, he took the position of People's Delegate for the Interior (Volksbeauftragter für das Innere) in the short-lived Bavarian Soviet Republic. After the defeat of the republic by Freikorps units, Soldmann was interned for three months. After his dismissal, he became a provincial secretary of the USPD in Bavaria. He additionally served as a city councillor and later mayor in Schweinfurt, switching his party affiliation in 1922 back to the SPD. Soldmann was particularly active in initiatives aimed at bettering the living conditions of the unemployed and was a vehement proponent of the introduction of unemployment insurance.

In the federal elections of June 1920, Soldmann was elected to the Reichstag as a candidate of the USPD for the Electoral District 29 (Franconia). During the first legislative period of the Weimar Republic in 1922, Soldmann returned to the SPD and joined the SPD caucus in the Reichstag. He began working for the SPD as a provincial party secretary in Bavaria, and transitioned to a role as an employment secretary in Schweinfurt, which he held from 1924 to 1933. In the federal election of July 1932, Soldmann was elected again to the Reichstag, now as an SPD member in Electoral District 26 (Franconia).

=== Nazi era ===
After the Nazi seizure of power, as a prominent social democrat Soldmann found himself subject to persecution by the new regime. Although Soldmann's parliamentary mandate had been reconfirmed during the 1933 election, in the same month he was placed into protective custody (Schutzhaft) despite his immunity as a parliamentarian. He was therefore unable to participate in the vote on the Enabling Act, which formed the legal basis for the establishment of the Nazi dictatorship.

In the following months, following several moves Soldmann was eventually sent to Dachau. He was eventually released, after which he moved several times. He last lived in Erfurt, where he worked as a representative for tobacco products. He used his work-related travel activities to make illegal contacts. After a denunciation by the authorities in 1936, his belongings were searched and prohibited literature was found. He was subsequently accused of treason and "disparagement of the Reich government" (Verächtlichmachung der Reichsregierung). Though the proceedings against him were annulled by a Sondergericht (special court) in Schweinfurt, Soldmann nevertheless remained in custody until 1937. After his release, he worked in a department store in Gräfendorf. The Gestapo still regarded him as potentially dangerous and suspected him of participating in resistance activities.

After the outbreak of World War II, he was arrested again in September 1939 and imprisoned in Sachsenhausen concentration camp until the spring of 1941. As part of Aktion Gitter, a mass arrest initiated by the Gestapo followed a failed assassination attempt against Hitler, Soldmann was arrested once more in August 1944 and imprisoned in Buchenwald. He was released in April 1945 following the liberation of the camp, but died several weeks later in Wernrode as a result of his imprisonment.

== Memorials ==
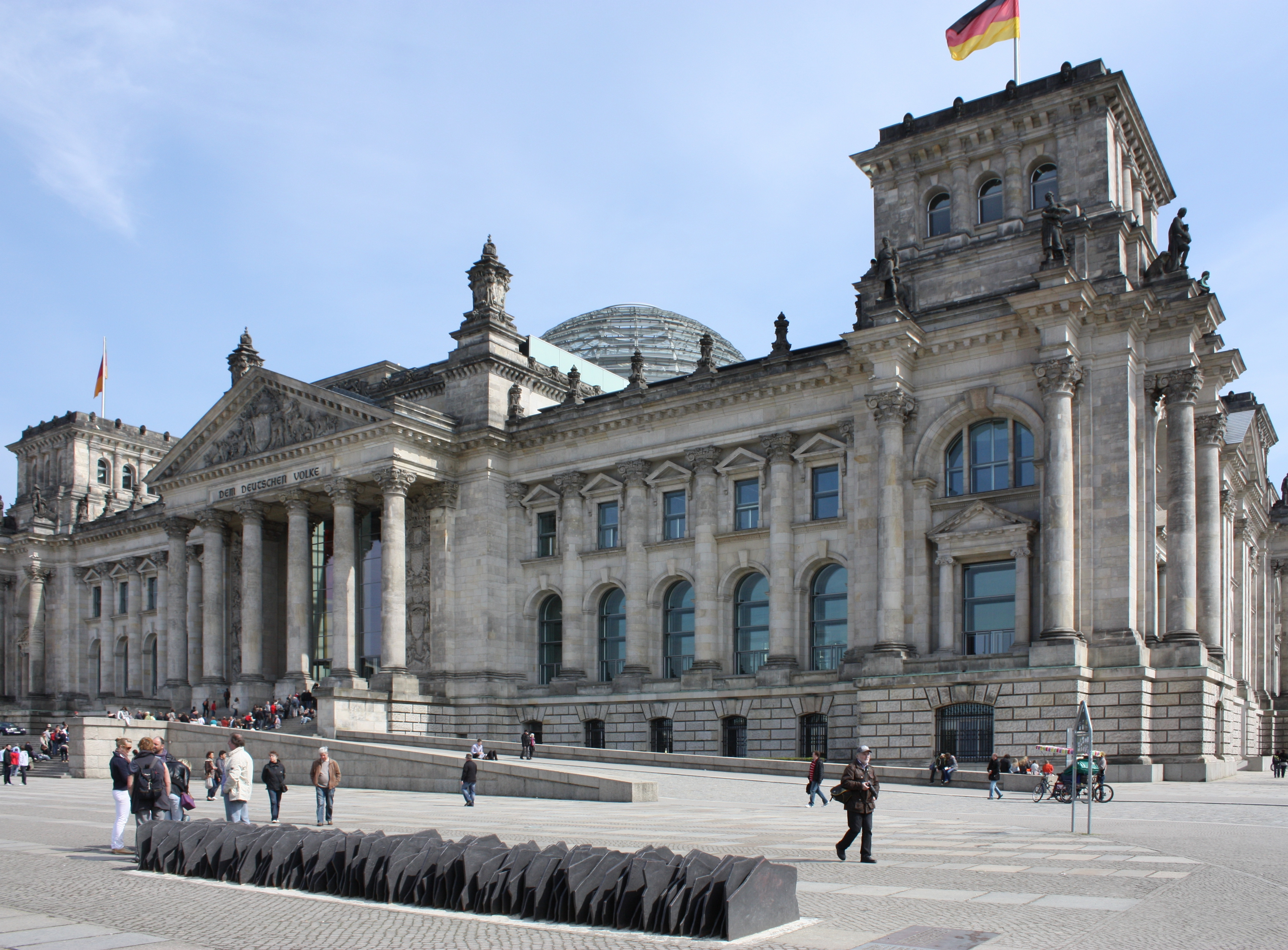
Memorial plaque at the Reichstag

In Schweinfurt, a street is named after Soldmann and a memorial plaque honours his memory. In Berlin, since 1992 Soldmann's name appears on one of the 96 plaques in the Memorial to the Murdered Members of the Reichstag, on the corner of Scheidemannstraße / Republic Square in Berlin near the Reichstag building.

== Literature ==
- "Frotz Soldmann". In: Franz Osterroth: Biographisches Lexikon des Sozialismus. Volume 1: Verstorbene Persönlichkeiten. Verlag J. H. W. Dietz Nachf. GmbH, Hannover 1960, p. 293. (German)
- Benedikt Hotz: "Fritz Soldmann (1878–1945)", in: Siegfried Mielke, Stefan Heinz (Hrsg.) unter Mitarbeit von Julia Pietsch: Gewerkschafter in den Konzentrationslagern Oranienburg und Sachsenhausen. Biografisches Handbuch, Volume 4 (= Gewerkschafter im Nationalsozialismus. Verfolgung – Widerstand – Emigration, Bd. 6). Metropol Verlag, Berlin 2013, ISBN 978-3-86331-148-3, p193-212. (German)
- Sozialdemokratische Partei Deutschlands (Hrsg.): Der Freiheit verpflichtet. Gedenkbuch der deutschen Sozialdemokratie im 20. Jahrhundert. Marburg 2000, p310f. (German)
