= Helene Fleischer =

German politician (1899–1941)

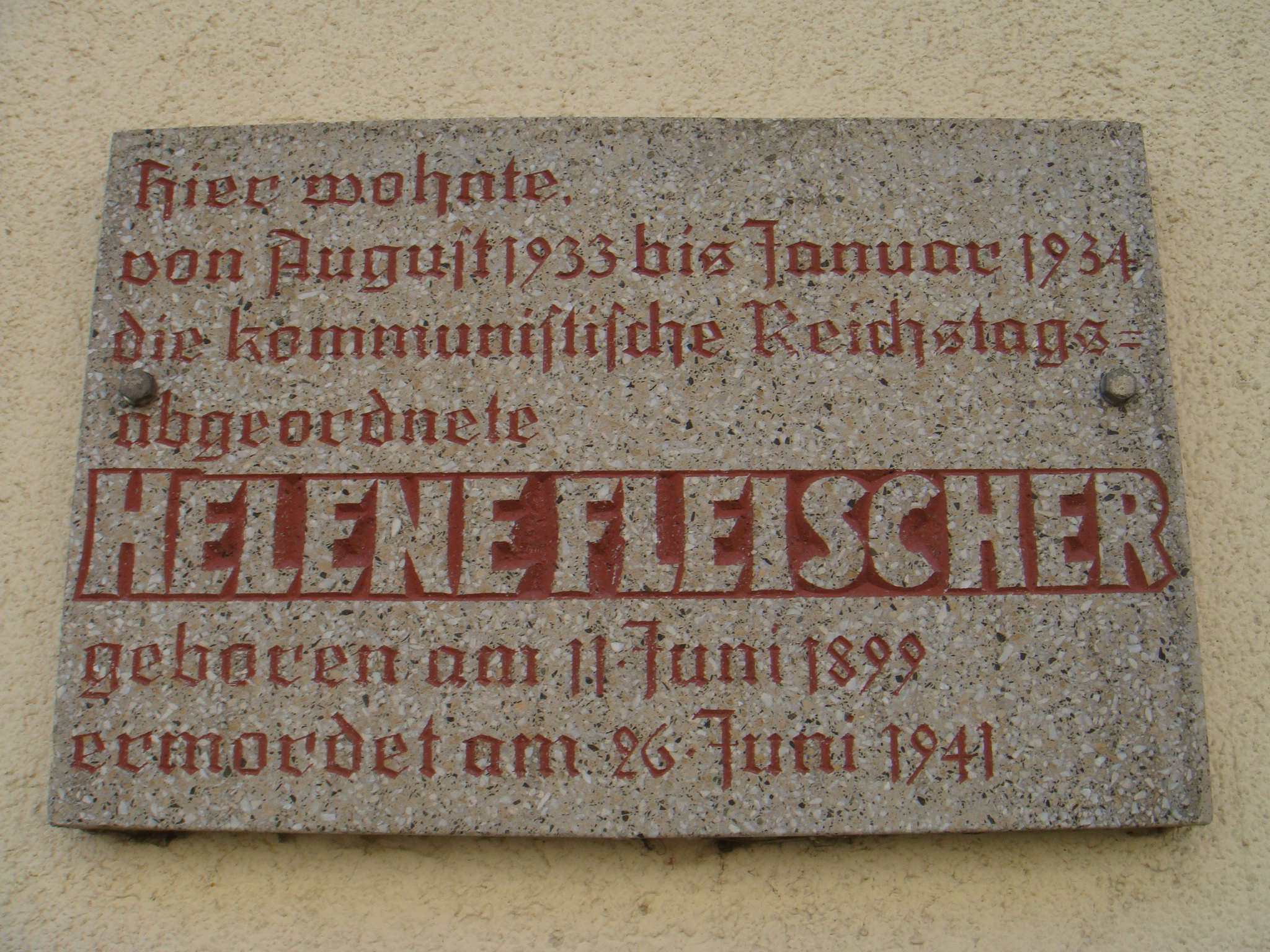
Memorial plaque at the hideout house at Christian-Zimmermann-Straße 15

Helene Fleischer (11 June 1899 – 26 June 1941), née Lätzsch, was a German Communist politician and a member of the German resistance movement against Nazism.

== Life ==
Helene Fleischer was born in Leumnitz near Gera, the daughter of a labourer and longstanding socialist. A freelance textile worker, she first joined the Social Democratic Party in 1919, and the Communist Party (KPD) in 1923. Starting in 1924, she was a member of the KPD regional subcommittee and from 1926, a member of the labour council of the "Louis Hirsch" textile factory in Gera. In 1931 she was elected to the state parliament of Thuringia, and in July 1932 and again in November 1932 to the Reichstag.

From 1933 she worked under the pseudonym "Hilde" as an illegal instructor for her party in several areas of Thuringia. On 13 January 1934, the Gestapo arrested Fleischer in her Apolda dwelling. On 30 May 1934, she was sentenced to three years' imprisonment by the Oberlandesgericht Jena for "treason" and was imprisoned in Gräfentonna and Hohenleuben. In May 1937 she was transferred to the Moringen concentration camp. After being released in 1938, Fleischer worked in the Gera-Greizer textile factory for worsted yarn. In February 1941, she was arrested again and endured serious abuse in the Gera prison. She was sent to the Stadtroda sanatorium in May 1941.

After being diagnosed with "severe schizophrenia and lung tuberculosis", Fleischer died in Stadtroda on 26 June 1941 in the women's ward led by Rosemarie Albrecht under unexplained circumstances.

== Memorials ==
Outside the house in Apolda which served as her hiding place (Christian-Zimmermann-Straße 15), a memorial plaque was installed during the time of the German Democratic Republic. The street on which it lies was formerly named Helene-Fleischer-Straße, but was renamed in 1990.

In Gera there is a street and a memorial plaque (Helene-Fleischer-Straße 2) commemorating Helene Fleischer. A nursing home (Helene-Fleischer-Haus) of People's Solidarity also bears her name. In front of her residence in Gera-Leumnitz (Naulitzer Straße 9), a Stolperstein was laid in 2012.

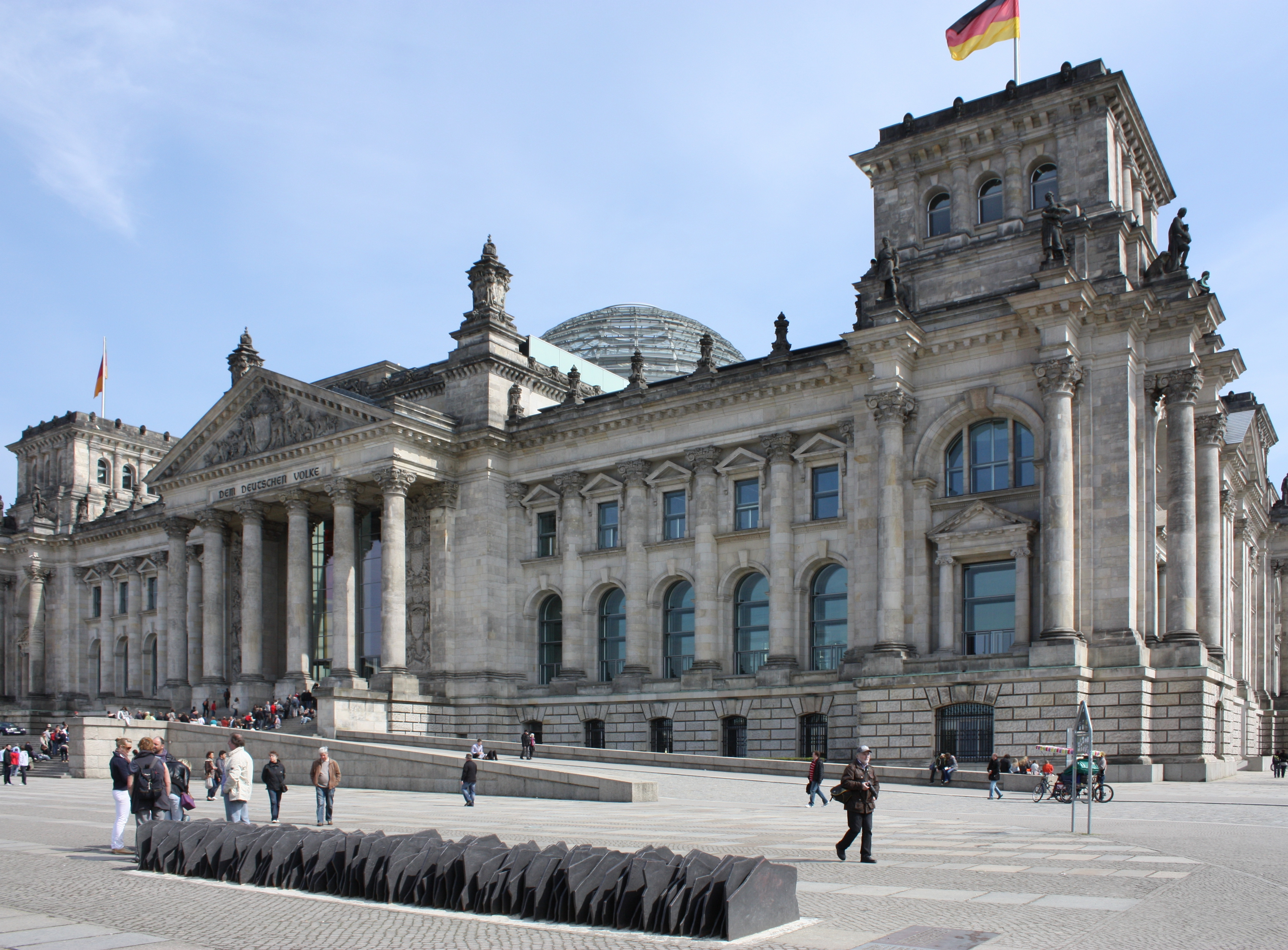
Memorial plaque at the Reichstag

Since 1992, Fleischer's name appears on one of the 96 plaques in the Memorial to the Murdered Members of the Reichstag, on the corner of Scheidemannstraße / Republic Square in Berlin near the Reichstag building.

== Links ==
- Information about Helene Fleischer in the Reichstag database
- Photographs from the page of the Free State of Thuringia
- Katrin Zeiss: „Das Gestern im Heute“, die tageszeitung, 27 January 2001 (German)
- Infobüro Gera: „Zeithistorische Umstände“, on Indymedia, 7 July 2003. (German)
