= Paul Jahnke =

German political activist (1893–1951)

- Born: 13 August 1893; Pasewalk, Province of Pomerania, Prussia, German Empire
- Died: 27 October 1951 (aged 58); East Berlin, East Germany

Paul Jahnke (13 August 1893 – 27 October 1951) was a German leftwing political activist who became a resistance activist against the Nazis.

== Life ==
Paul Jahnke was born in Pasewalk, a small town supported by food and tobacco manufacturing, with an important junction on the railway network, a short distance to the west of Stettin in Pomerania. He trained in mechanical engineering but then, in 1916, was conscripted into the army. However, he was released from military services with "50% war injuries".

In 1917 he joined the Independent Social Democratic Party ("Unabhängige Sozialdemokratische Partei Deutschlands" / USPD) when it broke away from the mainstream Social Democratic Party (SPD), primarily because of disagreement with the SPD party leadership decision to implement what amounted to a parliamentary truce for the duration of the war. As the USPD itself broke apart in the confused aftermath of military defeat, Jahnke was part of the left wing majority that in 1919 moved across to the newly formed Communist Party. In 1920 he joined another breakaway movement, becoming a member of the Communist Workers' Party (" Kommunistische Arbeiter-Partei Deutschlands" / KAPD), but in 1922, as the KAPD faded from the scene, Jahnke rejoined the Communist Party of Germany, becoming a local party secretary in the "Berlin North-east" sub-region ("Unterbezirk Berlin Nordost"). Further party appointments in the Berlin area followed. A source on the end of November 1931 identifies him as "Secretary and Policy leader of the Neukölln district Communist Party".

At the end of 1932 the Party Central Committee appointed him regional policy head for the Munich region, though it is not clear if there was time for him to move to Munich before the Nazi power seizure in January 1933. The new government lost no time in transforming Germany from a multi-party democracy to a one-party dictatorship. After the Reichstag fire in February 1933 political parties (apart from the Nazi party) were banned, and work for them became illegal. In practical terms not all parties were deemed equally anti-Nazi, however, and the authorities targeted the Communist Party for suppression and its activists for persecution. By May 1933 Jahnke was already working "underground" not in Munich but in Bremen as regional policy head ("politischer Leiter des Bezirks").

Available sources are silent about his political underground work, but according to one source it was not a success. In 1934 he was forced to emigrate to France where he joined a growing number of communist political exiles from Nazi Germany. His anti-Nazi activism in Germany had not gone unnoticed, however, and in 1936 a Nazi court condemned him, in absentia, to death in the so-called "Richardstrasse-Prozess" ("Richard Street Trial"). In November 1936 he was one of those who moved to Spain in order to fight against the Francoist nationalist forces during the Spanish Civil War. Jahnke remained in Spain till February 1939, fighting as a member of the International Brigades. He also served as a political commissar in Albacete which became the national headquarters of the International Brigades during the Civil War. After that he became "technical head" of a [Communist] party academy.

During 1939, the year in which the invasion of Poland by Nazi Germany and the Soviet Union triggered the outbreak of the Second World War, Jahnke moved to the relative safety of Norway. It was probably in Norway that he first met another high-profile Communist exile from Germany, Hanna Sandtner. In the event Norway, too, was overrun by the German army, and in 1940 the two of them fled to Sweden, supported by the Nansen Hjelp humanitarian organisation. In Sweden he was interned by the government and, for a period, suspended from the exiled German Communist Party group. It was during his period of internment that he entered into what turned out to be a long-term personal partnership with Sandtner.

War ended in German defeat in May 1945, with the western two thirds of the country divided into military occupation zones. Jahnke and Sandtner returned in March 1946 to the eastern part of Berlin which was by this time administered as part of the Soviet occupation zone - after October 1949 the Soviet sponsored German Democratic Republic / ("East Germany")).

In April 1946, one month after their arrival in the Soviet zone, a new political party, the Socialist Unity Party ("Sozialistische Einheitspartei Deutschlands" / SED), was launched under contentious circumstances. There was a widespread belief that the Nazi Party had been able to come to power only because of divisions on the political left, and the new party was presented as a way to prevent a recurrence of that. By 1949 the SED would itself have evolved, within the zone under Soviet administration, to become the ruling party in a new kind of German one-party dictatorship. Jahnke evidently was one of the thousands of Communist Party members who lost no time in signing their party membership across to the new party. He became a party official in East Berlin's Prenzlauer Berg quarter. Next he took a position as Human Resources chief with the Berliner Verlag newspaper publishing business. However, following differences with the managing editor of the Berliner Zeitung, Rudolf Herrnstadt, Jahnke resigned from the publishers and joined the country's quasi-military police service. With the police service he rose to become a chief inspector in Prenzlauer Berg before transferring to a job in charge of the East Berlin Police press department for the East Berlin police presidency. However, during a period of rising economic, political and social tension the East German leadership under Walter Ulbricht, almost all of whom had spent the war years in Moscow drawing up plans for what became the German Democratic Republic, became increasingly suspicious of party comrades who had been exposed to "the west" during the war. A particularly high-profile (and well documented) victim of this development was Paul Merker. Paul Jahnke was one of a number of less well documented highly placed members of the political establishment whose political careers came to an abrupt halt at around the same time. In 1951 Jahnke was relieved of all his politically connected posts and demoted to a positions as works manager at VEB Berliner Aufzugbau, a Berlin-based manufacturer of lifts/elevators.

Under circumstances described by at least one source as "mysterious", on 27 October 1951 Paul Jahnke died in the Police Hospital in East Berlin.
