= Augustin Sandtner =

German politician (1893–1944)

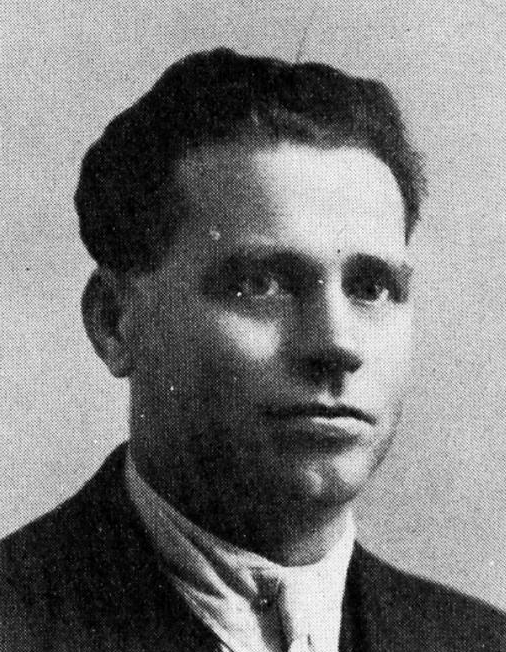
- Sandtner c. 1932

Member of the Landtag of Prussia for Breslau
- In office 25 May 1932 – 31 March 1933
- Preceded by: Multi-member district
- Succeeded by: Constituency abolished

Personal details
- Born: 8 August 1893 Munich, Kingdom of Bavaria, German Empire
- Died: 11 October 1944 (aged 51) Sachsenhausen concentration camp, Province of Brandenburg, Free State of Prussia, Nazi Germany
- Cause of death: Execution by shooting
- Party: KPD (after 1919)
- Other political affiliations: Spartacus League (1914–1918)
- Spouse: Hanna Ritter
- Nickname: Gustl

Military service
- Allegiance: German Empire; Munich Soviet; Revolutionaries
- Branch/service: Imperial German Navy; Bavarian Red Army
- Years of service: 1912–1918; 1919; 1921
- Unit: SMS Seydlitz
- Battles/wars: World War I; Kiel Mutiny; German Revolution; March Action
- Other offices held: 1932–1933: Political Leader, Silesia KPD; 1927–1931: Political Leader, Northern Berlin-Brandenberg KPD

Augustin "Gustl" Sandtner (8 August 1893 – 11 October 1944) was a German communist politician and anti-war activist who served, briefly, as a member of the Landtag of Prussia. When the Nazis came to power in 1933 he campaigned for several weeks against fascism and war. Following his arrest he survived more than eleven of the twelve years of Nazi rule in state captivity, but was shot dead at the Sachsenhausen concentration camp by Schutzstaffel (SS) paramilitaries a few months before the end of the Second World War.

== Life ==
Augustin Sandtner was born in Munich on 8 August 1893. His father worked as a marble cutter/grinder. "Gustl" trained for work in a bakery. In 1911 he became an organiser in the "Bakers and Pastry Makers Trades Union". In 1912 he was conscripted to undertake his military service in the Imperial German Navy. During World War I he joined the "International Group" and the "Spartacus League" which grew out of it. As a member of the crew on the Battlecruiser SMS Seydlitz he organised (illegal) revolutionary groups and distributed anti-war literature. On 3 November 1918 he participated in the Kiel mutiny which triggered a year of insurrections across Germany. A few days later he led a delegation of the Kiel sailors south to Munich where he was elected a member of the Soldiers' and Workers' Council.

During this period Sandtner became a member of the leadership of the Spartacus League, which over the final days of 1918 was reconfigured, renamed and relaunched, now the core of the new Communist Party of Germany (KPD). Sandtner was a member from the outset. As a member of the so-called Bavarian "Red army" during the short lived Bavarian Soviet Republic of April/May 1919, after the movement was crushed by a combination of still loyal government forces and "Freikorps" anti-communist volunteer units Sandtner found himself imprisoned at the end of May and threatened with execution. However, the government was keen not to encourage political extremists unnecessarily: many of those involved in the Munich insurrection received amnesties: Sandtner was released at the end of 1919. During 1920 and 1921 he was a member of the KPD regional leadership team ("Bezirksleitung") for south Bavaria. It was here that he met Hanna Ritter whom he would later marry. He was elected chair of the workers' council at BMW. In 1922 he was sentenced to three and a half years' imprisonment because of his involvement in organising solidarity support for the Communist-led insurrections in central Germany in March of the previous year.

After his release he moved to Berlin where he became a full-time party official in the city's Wedding and Moabit quarters. In 1926 he was re-arrested and taken into investigative custody because of "anti-militarism work among members of the national army". However, after a relatively brief period of detention he was amnestied, possibly in response to pressure applied by comrades locally, and released. He took over as head of the "State emigration department" ("Reichsemigrantenabteilung") of the party central committee. Sandtner next became local policy chief ("Polleiter") for several local party sub-districts including the northern part of the Berlin-Brandenburg district.

His focus switched away from Berlin when he became policy chief ("Polleiter") for the party leadership team in Silesia. Two months later, following the regional election in April 1932, he was elected a member of the Prussian parliament ("Landtag"). The political backdrop changed with the Nazi take-over in January 1933 and lost no time in transforming Germany into a one-party dictatorship. The Reichstag fire at the end of February 1933 was immediately blamed on "communists", and it was indeed those members (and former members) of the KPD who had not already gone into hiding or fled abroad who found themselves heading the government's political targets list. Augustin Sandtner spent the first part of 1933 in the border regions of Silesia organising joint rallies by Germany, Polish and Czechoslovak workers opposed to fascism and the looming risks of war.

On 7 February 1933, Sandtner was one of the participants at the "illegal" Sporthaus Ziegenhals meeting, celebrated subsequently (especially during the "East German" years) as the last meeting held by the KPD leadership before the participants were arrested and killed, or in a few cases managed to flee abroad. Augustin Sandtner was arrested in Breslau (now Wrocław) on 27 April 1933. In January 1934 he was sentenced to a three year prison term. At the end of the three year term he was transferred to the Sachsenhausen concentration camp.

== Death ==
Inside the concentration camp, as a leader of the illegal KPD organisation among the prisoners, working closely with members of resistance groups from other nations, he played a significant part in organising the anti-fascist struggle. After more than eleven years in detention, and still at Sachsenhausen, August Sandtner was one of 24 German camp inmates deemed culpable of "illegal activities" taken out, together with three French antifascists, and shot dead by Schutzstaffel (SS) paramilitaries on 11 October 1944. Others killed included Ernst Schneller and Matthias Thesen.

== Celebration ==
Some of the streets named after "communist heroes" in the days of the German Democratic Republic (East Germany) were renamed following German reunification in 1990. However, Augustin Sandtner is still (2017) commemorated on the Berlin street map by Augustin-Sandtner-Straße in the city's Oranienburg quarter. There is also a Gustl-Sandtner-Straße in Teltow on Berlin's southern edge.

During the East German period an army engineering regiment, the Ingenieurbauregiment 2 Augustin Sandtner, specialising in construction-engineering (including the building of large scale nuclear bunkers such as strategic command posts) was also named after Augustin Sandtner. The unit was also known by the unit designation IBR 2. In NVA nomenclature IBR was shorthand for Ingenieurbauregiment (Engineer Construction Regiment).
