= Ernst Reinke =

German Communist activist

Ernst Reinke (28 November 1891 –- 28 April 1943) was a German Communist activist who became a politician and, in 1930, member of parliament. After 1933 he went on to become a resistance activist. He spent his final years as a concentration camp inmate. Sources identify his 1943 killing by government paramilitaries at Camp Flossenbürg, in the mountains east of Nuremberg, as a murder.

== Life and works ==
Ernst Reinke was born at Adlig Schmelz, a district near the shoreline along southern edge of Memel (as Klaipėda was known at that time), an overwhelmingly German-speaking port city, albeit set in a region of what was then the German province of East Prussia in which Lithuanian was the principal language among the countryfolk. Between 1897 and 1905 he attended school in what was then Tilsit. After leaving school he worked on the barges. In 1911 he was conscripted into the navy: he served on SMS Nürnberg, a modern light cruiser completed a couple of years earlier. The ship was assigned at around this time to the German East Asia Squadron: Reinke was accordingly stationed in Chinese waters.

After the First World War Reinke joined the newly launched Communist Party which had emerged out of the anti-war movement. Still based in Tilsit, he worked till 1925 on the railways. During 1924-25 he was also a member of the city council. In 1925, following his participation in the major rail strike which took place in and around Tilsit, Reinke lost his job with the railways. In August 1925 he relocated to Berlin where he supported himself through factory work.

He became secretary of the League of antifascist fighters ("Kampfbund gegen den Faschismus"), founded on 28 September 1930 under the leadership, Hermann Remmele, in which Reinke for a period became de facto leader. That month he was also one of 77 Communist Party candidates elected to the Reichstag (national parliament). Reinke was excluded from his membership of the assembly on 30 June 1931, however. His parliamentary seat was taken over by Hanna Sandtner. He was also, through this time, a member of the leadership team of the Revolutionäre Gewerkschafts Opposition, a communist trades union set up in opposition to the politically more broadly based Allgemeiner Deutscher Gewerkschaftsbund, as mutual antagonism, encouraged from Moscow, between the Communist party and the Social Democratic Party, intensified.

Political polarisation had led to parliamentary deadlock which presented the Hitler government with their opportunity to take power in January 1933. They lost no time in transforming Germany into a one-party dictatorship. Overnight on 27/28 February 1933 the Reichstag fire presented a timely justification for an accelerated termination of democracy. With implausible haste, the government blamed the fire on communists. On 28 February, as the Reichstag Fire Decree was passed by parliament, communist members of parliament and other activists were arrested. Ernst Reinke was one of them. He was taken to the Alexanderplatz Police Station and "badly mishandled". For more than a year he was then detained at the Esterwegen concentration camp in the north-west of Germany.

Following his release in August 1934 Reinke worked as a "mixer" at the Siemes-Plania chemicals plant in Griesheim (south of Frankfurt), where he set about creating a secret Communist cell. His (since 1933 illegal) political activities in the factory came to the attention of the security service and when war broke out in September 1939 they re-arrested him. Reinke was delivered to the Sachsenhausen concentration camp. In April 1940 he was transferred to Flossenbürg concentration camp, where he was murdered by the SS on 28 April 1943.

== Celebration ==
During the 1960s a street in a new residential development in Berlin-Lichtenberg was named Ernst-Reinke-Straße. Although the area was redevelopment following reunification, the name honouring the murdered Communist politician has been retained. Around the same time, in the state-owned graphite products factory of VEB Elektrokohle Lichtenberg, a brigade (work group) was given the name "Ernst Reinke Brigade". Since its erection in front of the Reichstag building in 1992, Ernst Reinke has also been one of 96 murdered members of the Reichstag individually commemorated by the Memorial to the Murdered Members of the Reichstag.
