= Ernst Schneller =

German schoolteacher and politician

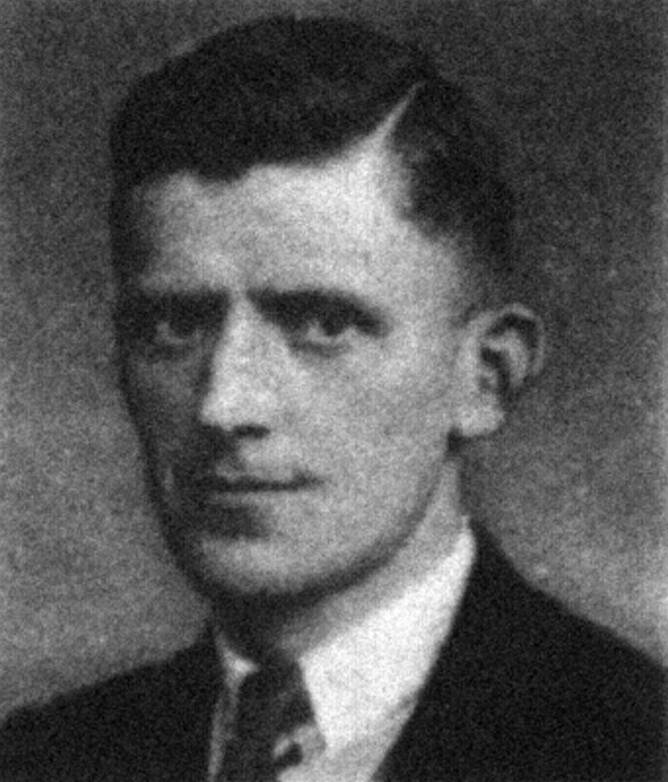
- Schneller c. 1928

Member of the Reichstag for Chemnitz–Zwickau
- In office 5 January 1925 – 28 February 1933
- Preceded by: Multi-member district
- Succeeded by: Constituency abolished

Member of the Landtag of Saxony
- In office 5 April 1921 – 24 February 1924
- Preceded by: Gottfried Weimer
- Succeeded by: Richard Schmincke

Personal details
- Born: 8 November 1890 Leipzig, Kingdom of Saxony, German Empire
- Died: 11 October 1944 (aged 53) Sachsenhausen concentration camp, Province of Brandenburg, Free State of Prussia, Nazi Germany
- Cause of death: Execution by shooting
- Party: SPD (before 1920); KPD (after 1920)
- Spouse: Hildegard Schwedler (m. 1916)
- Children: Annemarie; Helmut
- Occupation: Schoolteacher; Politician; Anti-Nazi Activist

Military service
- Allegiance: German Empire
- Years of service: 1914–1918
- Rank: Battalion Adjutant
- Battles/wars: World War I; Eastern Front
- Central institution membership: 1924–1929: Full member, KPD Politburo; 1924–1929: Full member, KPD Central Committee (Note: Zentrale until 1925); Other offices held: 1927: Political Leader, Erzgebirge-Vogtland KPD

Ernst Hugo Schneller (8 November 1890 – 11 October 1944) was a German school teacher. In 1914 he volunteered to join the army when World War I broke out. Sent to fight on the Eastern Front, he became politicised and radicalised, especially as the ideas behind the Russian Revolution filtered through to the German troops. After the war he joined first the Social Democratic Party and then, in 1920, the recently launched Communist Party of Germany. He served as a regional member ("Landtagsabgeordneter") of parliament in the Saxon parliament ("Landtag") between 1921 and 1924, and then between 1924 and 1933 as a member ("Reichstagsabgeordneter") of the national parliament ("Reichstag"). He was arrested in 1933 and imprisoned. Transfer to the Sachsenhausen concentration camp followed in 1939.

On 11 October 1944, Ernst Schneller was one of 24 German camp inmates deemed culpable of "communist activities", taken out, and together with three French communist shot dead by Nazi paramilitaries (SS).

== Life ==
=== Provenance and early years ===
Ernst Schneller was born in Leipzig, the sixth child of a railway official. His father was also a veteran of the Royal Saxon Army. His father died in 1895 but there are nevertheless indications that aspects of the family's military tradition were inherited by the son.

He attended a teacher training institution from which he briefly withdrew in 1910 under circumstances that remain unclear. He nevertheless passed the necessary exams to become a teaching assistant, and worked in this capacity from 1911 till 1913 at Kirchberg im Erzgebirge, a small town in the mining region south of Zwickau. He then passed more exams and became a qualified teacher, moving to a school in Leipzig. War broke out in July 1914 and Schneller unhesitatingly volunteered for military service. In 1916 he was sent on an officers' training course, after which he was promoted to the rank of Leutnant. Further promotions followed. By 1917/1918, still on the Eastern Front, Ernst Schneller was serving as a "Bataillonsadjutant". He also found time, in 1916, to marry Hilde (1894–1989).

=== A return to teaching amid postwar instability ===
Military defeat in November 1918 was quickly followed by a succession of revolutionary outbursts at the ports and then in the German towns and cities. Revolutionary sentiments were also prevalent among soldiers in the defeated armies, especially on the Eastern Front where Ernst Schneller was one of those elected to membership of a Soldiers' Council (sometimes translated as "Soldiers' soviet"). In January 1919 he returned home to what had been, till a few weeks earlier, the Kingdom of Saxony. He settled in Schwarzenberg (a small town south of Chemnitz) and resumed his teaching career in March 1919, taking a position which in the meantime his wife had been filling on his behalf. He also took a conscious decision to become involved in politics and work for the "elimination of capitalist exploitation". At a time of political polarisation, left-wingers on the town council had objected to the appointment of a former army officer as a teacher in the local school, but the objections were withdrawn a few weeks later when Ernst Schneller joined the Social Democratic Party ("Sozialdemokratische Partei Deutschlands" / SPD). He also joined the town council. An apolitical small-town school teacher who had been a nationalist before the war had now become radicalised.

Widespread destitution, intensified by the burden on government finances of war reparations and, later, currency collapse, gave rise to continuing political instability across the country during the early 1920s. One symptom was the existence of various right-wing "Freikorps" militias, composed of unemployed former soldiers, many of whom hankered after a return to pre-war conditions. The Kapp Putsch in March 1920 was a revolt against continuing economic austerity and an attempt to topple the republican constitution put in place during 1919. It failed. In Schwarzenberg, putting his military experience at the service of the post-imperial status quo, Ernst Schneller organised a form of workers' militia which was effective in resisting right-wing backers of the putsch. He found himself working closely with members of the Communist Party and was, according to one source, "impressed by the consistency of their approach". By November 1920 Ernst Schneller had joined the recently launched Communist Party of Germany.

=== Landtag member ===
In November 1920 the party nominated him as a candidate for election to the regional parliament ("Sächsischer Landtag"), which was based in Leipzig. However, the communists polled only 5.7% of the total vote in the election in Saxony, and Schneller narrowly failed to gain a seat. However, on 23 March 1921 Gottfried Weimer, a Communist who had been elected to the parliament, retired and in April 1921 his seat passed to Schneller. In the parliament he spoke frequently on his specialist subject, calling for what amounted to a revolution on public education. Tireless campaigning on behalf of children and young people became a long-standing theme of his political career. Aspects of his party's policy which he advocated on the floor of the parliament included free school meals and access to "learning resources" along with free medical and dental check-ups for school children and pre-school children.

His military skills again came into play during the 1921 March Action (brief uprising) which this time was a Communist-led insurrection, though sources are unclear as to the nature and extent of his involvement. During 1921 there are indications that Schneller may have been drawing close to Paul Levi and his group of "moderates" within the Communist Party. However, he remained a loyal Communist Party member after Levi, who had started 1921 as party leader, was excluded from it. At the end of 1921 Schneller himself was elected to head up the local party leadership team for the Aue-Schwarzenberg sub-district. He nevertheless still managed to combine his various political roles and responsibilities with his work as a school teacher, leading what some regarded as a somewhat ascetic existence. He avoided alcohol. By 1923 he was closely associated with the party leadership around Heinrich Brandler, who in 1923 entrusted him with building up the para-military Proletarische Hundertschaften (loosely, "Proletarian Centurions") in Saxony (within which he took a leadership role) and other quasi-military tasks.

Involvement in the Hamburg Uprising in October 1923 led to his suffering a period of what one source describes as "persecution by the regime's justice system" ("...von der Weimarer Justiz verfolgt"). He was briefly arrested and then, because of his connections to the Communist Party, dismissed from the schools service in November 1924. Elsewhere it is stated unambiguously that he resigned from the schools service of his own volition. Either way, the loss of his teaching job opened the way for a switch to national politics, and he moved to Berlin, becoming a salaried party official. The events of October 1923 were widely seen within the party as a set-back, and Schneller's immediate reaction was to swing towards the moderate faction: shortly before the 1924 Party Conference in Frankfurt, however, he declared his allegiance to the left-wing in a party that was always prone to acute and sometimes destructive outbursts of factionalism.

=== Reichstag and Central Committee member ===
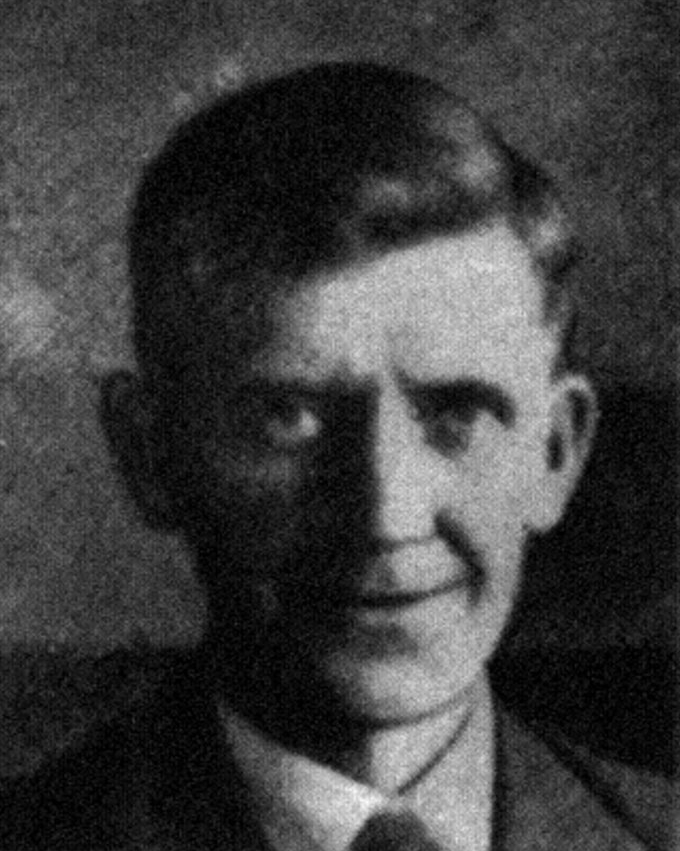
Schneller's official Reichstag portrait, 1930

In December 1924 Schneller successfully stood for election to the national parliament ("Reichstag"). He sat as a Communist Party member, representing Electoral District 30 (Chemnitz–Zwickau) from the end of 1924 till 1933. His entry in the official Parliamentary directory ("Reichstags-Handbuch") is unusually brief: it describes him as a "teacher in Schwarzenberg (Saxony)" and as a "dissident".

The Ninth Party Congress was held at Frankfurt in April 1924. At it Ernst Schneller was one of the fifteen delegates elected to membership of the powerful "Parteizentrale", precursor to the Party Central Committee and effectively the governing body of the party. Within that committee he took responsibility for important military and organisational matters. In 1925 he was elected to take charge of the National Party Academy ("Reichsparteischule Rosa Luxemburg") at Schöneiche–Fichtenau. After moving to Berlin and becoming a full-time party official at the end of 1924 he became identified as an adherent of the Ruth Fischer leadership faction in the party. Fischer had been appointed co-leader of the party in April and was identified as a resolute "anti-Stalinist". Schneller was soon given responsibility for the department in charge of "Theoretical work" and "Agitprop". During 1924 the Fischer-Maslow leadership team came under increasing pressure from committed pro-Stalinists within the party, and early in 1925, as the influence of Karl Korsch and the "ultra-left-wingers" increased at the expense of the formal party leadership, Schneller became the publisher of the theoretical newspaper "Internationale" and leader of the "Marxist-Leninist Circle". He quickly made himself as reputation as a leading proponent of the "Struggle against Trotskyism and Luxemburgism", which implicitly but unambiguously meant that he was now lining up with the pro-Stalinists.

The Tenth Party Congress was held at Berlin in July 1925. The "Parteizentrale" was replaced by a Party Central Committee and now had eighteen members. One of these, as before, was Ernst Schneller. He presented the Report of the "Parteizentrale" to the assembled delegates and was treated as "general secretary", although the position was not one that, formally, yet existed within the party.

After the death of Lenin in 1924 the power of Stalin in Moscow appears to have become almost limitless. There were close links between the Communist Party leaderships in Moscow and Berlin, and Stalin seems to have become virtually a "de facto king-maker" for the German party, which in part was a reflection of the acute divisions within the German party itself. To the disappointment of some, it turned out that Stalin was not an admirer of Karl Korsch and the "ultra-left-wingers". Nevertheless, for the next few years, until the Communist Party of Germany finally split in 1928/29, the defining division within it was between pro-Stalinists and anti-Stalinists (generally identified by Stalin himself as Trotskyists). Ernst Thälmann, the Central Committee member who emerged as leader of the Communist Party of Germany in October 1925, was a pro-Stalinist. Ernst Schneller emerged as an enthusiastic Thälmann backer with a level of haste that, even in the context of the rapidly shifting inner workings of the German Communist Party at that time, attracted a certain level of disbelief and some derision. Over in Moscow, Nikolai Bukharin went on record with a description of Schneller as a "without political character" ("politisch charakterloses Subjekt"). Party opponents quipped that Schneller played an important role within the party only because he was "smarter than Ernst Thälmann and more hard working than Philipp Dengel" ("klüger als Ernst Thälmann und fleißiger als Philipp Dengel").

Schneller did indeed receive important appointments under the new leadership, becoming "Polleiter" (loosely, "Head of Policy") with the party leadership team ("Bezirksleitung") in the party's Erzgebirge-Vogtland. He arrived with an instruction from the national party leadership to isolate the left-wingers around Paul Bertz and Heinrich Wesche. At the Eleventh Party Congress, held at Essen in March 1927, he was re-elected to the Party Central Committee, now swollen to 35 members. He was also re-elected to its inner "Politburo".

=== Career peak ===
During 1927/28 Schneller was intensively involved in party attempts to uncover the Lohman Affair ("Phoebus Scandal"), a conspiracy of some complexity which lasted for several years and involved a bankrupt film company and various attempts by or on behalf of the government to fund covert rearmament. In 1928 the German party sent Schneller to Moscow as a delegate for the Sixth World Congress of the Comintern. He was appointed to the candidates' list for the powerful Comintern Executive Committee (ECCI / ИККИ). He would never make it to membership of the committee, however.

It was also in 1928 that Ernst Thälmann's comrade and close friend, John Wittorf from the Hamburg party leadership, was involved in a major embezzlement scandal. On 26 September 1928 a meeting of the Central Committee took place at which Ernst Thälmann, like other party leaders before him, was removed from the leadership. The meeting was chaired by Schneller. However, Thälmann arranged for the matter to be referred to the ECCI in Moscow, which gave Stalin the opportunity to reverse Thälmann's removal. The German party's Central Committee decision to condemn Thälmann had been "mistaken". The result was that Ernst Thälmann was rapidly "rehabilitated" and restored to the leadership: the Communist Party of Germany fell more firmly under Moscow's control than ever. The result of the "error" for Ernst Schneller was rapid removal from the Politburo. The Twelfth Party Congress was held in the Wedding quarter of Berlin in June 1929. This time thirty-eight comrades were elected to Central Committee membership. Ernst Schneller was no longer among them, however. He was nevertheless given a job by the Central Committee, in the "Business department" ("Geschäftsabteilung") where for some months he was made responsible for "party printed matter".

His return to grace was only partial. However, at the Party Conference in October 1932 he was again given management-level responsibilities and then readmitted to the Central Committee. He took over the information Department. A few months later everything changed. The National Socialists took power in January 1933 and lost no time in transforming Germany into a one-party dictatorship. Political activity (except in support of the National Socialists) became illegal, but it very soon became clear that the authorities were keen to pursue with particular fervour those who were or had been Communist Party members. Ernst Schneller's position was particularly exposed because his leadership role over many years in respect of the Communist Party's "military-political" work meant that he had a higher public profile than most party officials. On 7 February 1933 Schneller was one of the participants at the "illegal" Sporthaus Ziegenhals meeting, celebrated subsequently (especially during the "East German" years) as the last meeting held by the German Communist Party leadership before the participants were arrested and killed or, in some cases, managed to escape abroad.

=== A Communist leader in Germany under National Socialism ===
The Reichstag fire took place on the night of 27 February 1933. Although the government, with almost indecent haste, identified it as part of a communist plot, many took the view that it was actually the government that appeared to have planned for such an eventuality. Several leading members of the Communist Party were promptly arrested. Ernst Schneller was among those arrested overnight in Berlin on 27/28 February 1933 and taken to the "Investigatory Prison" in Berlin-Moabit. Because of the dangers inherent in the political situation, communist leaders had been instructed by the party not to stay with their families: Schneller was at home with his family in defiance of those instructions when the police came for him. The authorities immediately launched a rumour to the effect that he had defected to the National Socialists and betrayed party-leader Thälmann. Initially this item of fake news was widely believed, even in Communist circles.

In April 1933 he was transferred to the newly opened Sonnenburg concentration camp. Schneller was moved again on 8 July 1933, this time to a penitentiary in Leipzig ("Gefangenenanstalt II") where he was held in investigatory detention. On 9 November 1933 he faced trial at the Supreme Court in Leipzig. Convicted of incitement to high treason, he was sentenced to six year's imprisonment and five years of deprivation of citizens' rights ("Ehrverlust"). On 16 November 1933 he was removed to the Waldheim Penitentiary where, for the next six years, he was held in solitary confinement.

In July 1939, his jail term having been completed, Schneller was transferred to the Sachsenhausen concentration camp where he was identified as Prisoner 764. He was later assigned a new number, "1181715". He was seconded to the "Klinkerwerk", effectively a large heavy-tile factory in the concentration camp. The work was inhumanly heavy and there is a report of an occasion when he collapsed, but with the support of comrades he recovered rapidly. In the camp he became one of the leaders of an illegal Communist party group among the inmates: he was able to ensure that the group were able to stay informed about political and military developments in the world outside.

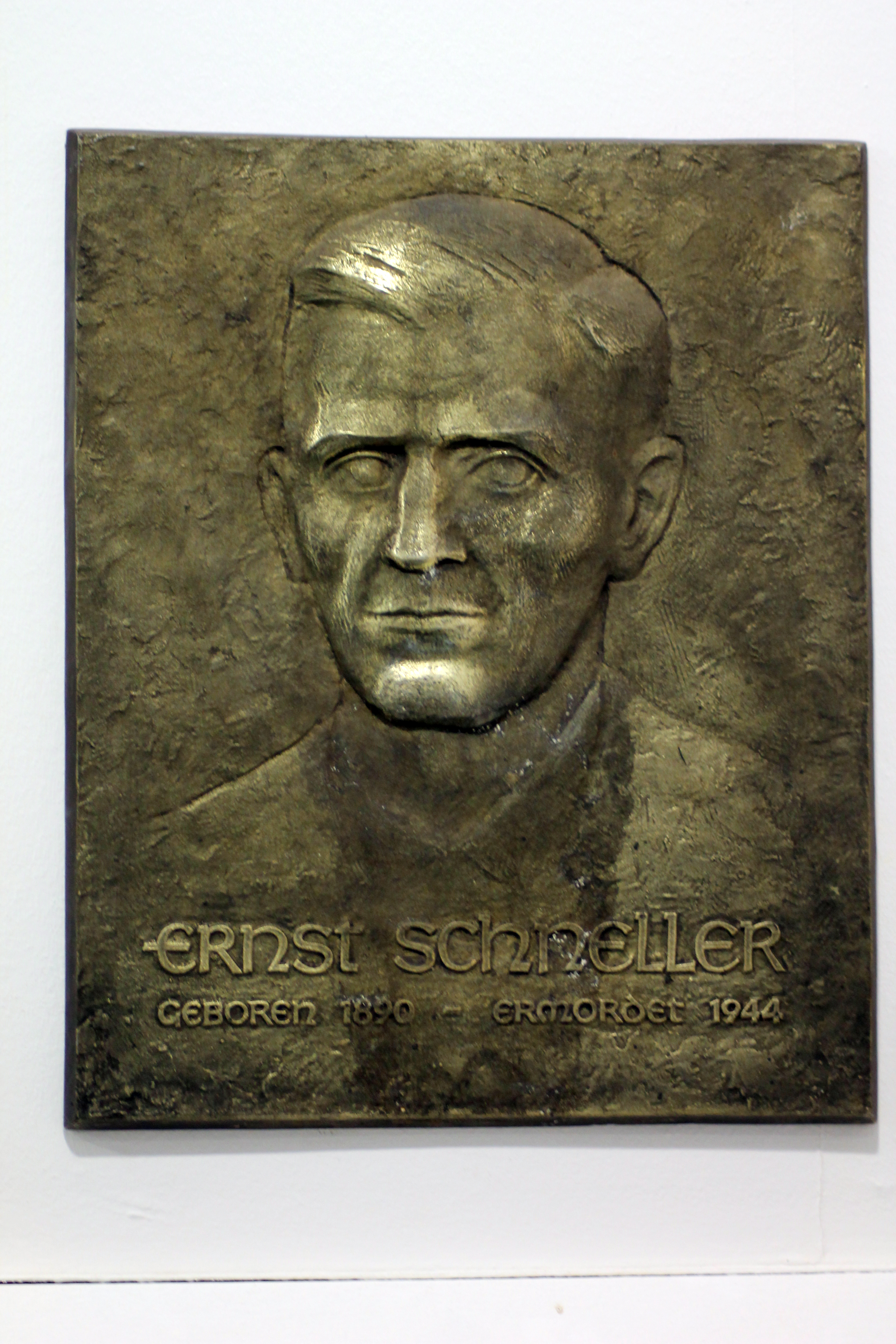
Ernst Schneller relief at the Sachsenhausen concentration camp

In March 1944 an SS guard discovered leaflets and a radio belonging to the group, which is probably connected with reports that the communist group within the camp were planning some sort of an insurrection and a mass escape. The group was quickly infiltrated with spies. A major operation against the group took place on 11 August 1944 after which 150 inmates were moved to "isolation bloc 58". On 11 October 1944 103 of these were moved to the Mauthausen concentration camp near Linz. A further 27 – mostly communists – were taken out and shot dead by Nazi paramilitaries (SS). Those killed included Ernst Schneller as well as Mathias Thesen, Ludger Zollikofer, Rudolf Hennig and Gustl Sandtner.

== Family ==
Ernst and Hilde Schneller married in 1916. After Ernst Schneller was arrested their daughter Annemarie (later Annemarie Raeder) was looked after by Arthur Rackwitz, a Lutheran pastor who in various ways played a quietly heroic role during the Hitler years. The Schnellers also had a son: Helmut Schneller (1922–2010) later made a reputation for himself as an author in the German Democratic Republic. He worked between 1953 and 1990 as "cabaret author" at East Berlin's Distel Cabaret Theatre, and liked to claim that his work at the cabaret was primarily motivated (till 1990) by the constant game he played with the censor.

== Legacy ==
The Ernst Schneller Banner of Honor, awarded to companies for good performance

In the German Democratic Republic, which functioned as a Soviet sponsored separate version of Germany between 1949 and 1989/90, there was an Ernst Schneller Street or an Ernst Schneller Square or an Ernst Schneller School or college in many towns and cities. There was an Ernst Schneller Barracks in Berlin-Alt-Treptow, as well as a special home for looking after and monitoring troubled children and young people in Eilenburg named after him. On 3 September 1973 a company of "missile troops" ("Geschoßwerfertruppenteil") in the National People's Army was assigned his name. Many of these very public buildings named after Ernst Schneller were renamed following the 1990 reunification, but there are still plenty of towns and cities left in the former East Germany with their own "Ernst Schneller Straße" ("Ernst Schneller Street"). These include Leipzig, Halle, Erfurt, Jena and Heidenau. A 150 m^{2} ocean-yacht used between 1954 and 1989/90 by the "August Lütgens GTS naval school" also carried his name. The sports-yacht was subsequently sold to the municipality of Anklam and renamed "Arms of Anklam". The Ernst Schneller Medal for sporting achievement in the "Sport and Technology Society" ("Gesellschaft für Sport und Technik"/ GTS) was inaugurated in 1961.

In 1977, the East German Television Service ("Deutscher Fernsehfunk" / DFF) produced a biographical film about Schneller. Horst Schulze played the part of Ernst Schneller. The part of his wife Hilde was played by a leading star of East German cinema, Renate Blume. Schneller was featured again in the 1986 DFF biographical film about Ernst Thälmann. This time Schneller was portrayed by Wilfried Pucher.

In September 1992 a Memorial to the Murdered Members of the Reichstag was erected in front of the Reichstag building in Berlin. Ernst Schneller is one of the 96 commemorated on it.

On 11 October 2014 the memorial piece "Klang der Erinnerung" ("Voice of remembering") by arts student Eva Susanne Schmidhuber was unveiled at the Sachsenhausen Memorial Centre. Schmidhuber's work commemorates 27 prisoners shot dead at the concentration camp seventy years before. It was selected as part of an arts competition arranged by the Berlin-Weißensee Arts Academy in collaboration with the surviving friends and relatives of the victims.
