= Hanna Sandtner =

German politician

Hanna Sandtner (born Johanna Ritter: 26 August 1900 - 26 February 1958) was a German politician (KPD). She served as a member of the national parliament (Reichstag) between 1931 and 1932.

== Life ==
Johanna Ritter was born in Munich. Her father worked as a chauffeur. As a young woman she worked in a packaging factory and as a book keeper. She joined the anti-war left-wing Spartacus League in 1918. Less than two years later she was a founder member of the German Communist Party. During 1919, she received a six-month jail sentence because of her involvement in the short-lived Munich Soviet (Räterepublik) episode. Two years later, following participation in the Central German Insurrection, she received an eighteen-month sentence, convicted of "Offences against the Explosives Law" (Vergehen gegen das Sprengstoffgesetz). She served this sentence between 1921 and 1923, at the women's prison in Aichach.

On her release she became a party policy leader (Polleiterin) in Munich and women's leader in the party regional leadership (KPD-Bezirksleitung) for southern Bavaria. It was here that she met Augustin Sandtner whom she would later marry. In 1923 she relocated to Berlin. Here, between 1925 and 1931, she was employed at the (large) Soviet Trade Mission. From 1931 she became a full-time party official with the regional party leadership (Bezirksleitung) for Berlin-Brandenburg. That same year she became a Berlin city councillor, a function which she would carry out till February 1933.

In July 1931 Hanna Sandtner became a member of the national parliament ("Reichstag"), taking over the seat made available by the mid-term resignation of her party comrade, Ernst Reinke. She was one of those who represented the Berlin electoral district (Wahlkreis 2)". Parliamentary records identify her occupation before entering the parliament as that of a typist ("Stenotypistin"). She retained the seat in the July 1932 general election, but did not contest it in the second general election of 1932, which was held in November.

The political backdrop changed decisively in January 1933 when the Nazi Party took power and lost little time in transforming Germany into a one-party dictatorship. Party political activity - except on behalf of the Nazi party - was now illegal. At the end of February 1933 the Reichstag fire was blamed on communists, many of whom - including Hanna Sandtner's predecessor in the Reichstag, Ernst Reinke, were promptly arrested. Others fled abroad. Sandtner embarked on an under-cover career as a party instructor in the party's "Berlin north" sub-district (Unterbezirk). In July 1933 a report on (communist) "party cadres" noted that "in any case, Hanna Sandtner seems always to have been involved in unclear associations during the course of her political life. That is now an established "tradition" which must be taken seriously".

In February 1934 she fled to Moscow where she settled, attending courses at the International Lenin School. In December 1934 she was ready to return to the west: travelling under a false name she moved to Austria which at this stage was still a separate state, albeit one where the new government was in many ways closely aligned, philosophically, with Nazi Germany. During the next few months she worked with the leadership of the (since 1933 illegal) Austrian Communist Party. On 30 October 1935 Sandtner, who at this stage was living under the name "Anna Gelb", was arrested in Vienna. In March 1936 she was convicted of "high treason" and sentenced to one and a half years of imprisonment. Her husband had already been officially detained in Germany since 1935, and would later, in October 1944, be murdered in the Sachsenhausen concentration camp.

Hanna Sandtner was released, however, as part of an amnesty in July 1936. During 1937 she moved to Czechoslovakia and worked for the communist movement in Prague till the German occupation took effect. She then lived for some time in Poland before moving to Norway. It was probably in Norway that she first met another high-profile Communist exile from Germany, Paul Jahnke, with whom, around this time, she entered into what turned out to be a long-term partnership. In 1940 the two of them fled to Sweden, supported by the Nansen Hjelp humanitarian organisation.

On arriving in Sweden the two of them were initially interned. On her release Sandtner worked as a cleaner and as a metal worker. By this time there was a substantial group of exiled German communists in Sweden, and initially Jahnke and Sandtner found themselves shunned by the others. This appears to have resulted partly from the fragile state of political confidence which affected the group, and partly from doubts expressed by Jahnke (and apparently not challenged by Sandtner) during the summer of 1941 over the prospects for ultimate victory by the Red army.

War ended in May 1945: in March 1945 Jahnke and Sandtner returned to Berlin, which now lay at the heart of a large Soviet occupation zone. The next month saw the controversial creation of the Socialist Unity Party (Sozialistische Einheitspartei Deutschlands / SED), and Sandtner was evidently one of the many thousands of Communist Party members, in the Soviet zone, who lost no time in signing their party membership across to the new party. She became a member of the new party's Labour Department, and held a position of responsibility in respect of social welfare issues in the Party Executive. In March 1947 she was appointed by the Party Central Committee "Head of Popular Solidarity" (Geschäftsführerin der Volkssolidarität), a function which appears to have been connected with the health insurance reforms being implemented by the Central Committee member, Helmut Lehmann.

In September 1948 Hanna Sandtner fell seriously ill. She went to Switzerland for several months in order to recover her health and, it has been suggested, mandated by the party hierarchy to keep an eye on the prominent communist novelist Erich Weinert, who was also, accompanied by his wife, visiting Switzerland in the hope of a cure.

In May 1949, back in the Soviet occupation zone, Sandtner was transferred to the presidium of the People's Police (national police service) where she was given the rank of a police commander - considered equivalent to that of a lieutenant colonel. Her special assignment involved taking charge of the police press department.

In October 1949 the region administered as the Soviet occupation zone was relaunched as the Soviet sponsored German Democratic Republic, a new kind of one-party dictatorship. At the top of the ruling party there were no dramatic personnel changes, but a year later, with international political tensions high and the East German government increasingly nervous, Hanna Sandtner was relieved of her senior police job and switched to the debt recovery service. Reasons given included another health crisis and suspicion generated by the months she had spent in "the west" at the end of 1948. She also suffered a personal tragedy in October 1951 with the death of her life partner, Paul Jahnke.

In April 1951 an announcement appeared that she had switched to a job heading up the school service in a textile and clothing. In her final years Hanna Sandtner became increasingly embittered. In October 1953 she approached Hermann Matern, a powerful member of the Party Central Committee, with her concerns about the "mysterious circumstances" surrounding the death of Paul Jahnke. Her approach was not successful. In July 1954 she received a formal rebuke for an attitude damaging to the good of the party (parteischädigenden Verhaltens). (However, she was not deprived of her VVN pension for victims of Nazi persecution.)

Hanna Sandtner died in East Berlin on 26 February 1958.

== Award ==
- 1950 Medal of Honour of the German People's Police
