= Franziska Kessel =

German politician

Franziska Kessel (6 January 1906, in Cologne – 23 April 1934, in Mainz) was a German politician. She was a member of the Reichstag representing the Communist Party of Germany. After the party was made illegal, she joined the underground, was arrested, and subsequently died in jail.

== Background ==
Kessel was born in Cologne and worked as a shop assistant. She was close to leftist groups and, in 1926, she joined the Communist Party of Germany. She also started her job as an editor of Kommunistische Arbeiter-Zeitung in Frankfurt. She spent one year in jail under the charge of high treason, was freed, and in July 1932 became the deputy of the Reichstag. In November 1932, she was reelected. After the Nazi seizure of power, in March 1933 the party was outlawed, and Kessel became active in the Communist underground. On 4 April 1933 she was arrested and sentenced to three years in jail. She was held in the correction house in Mainz. During the incarceration, she was tortured and lost her vision. On 23 April 1934, she was found hanged in her cell. It is still unclear whether this was a suicide or a murder.

== Memorial ==
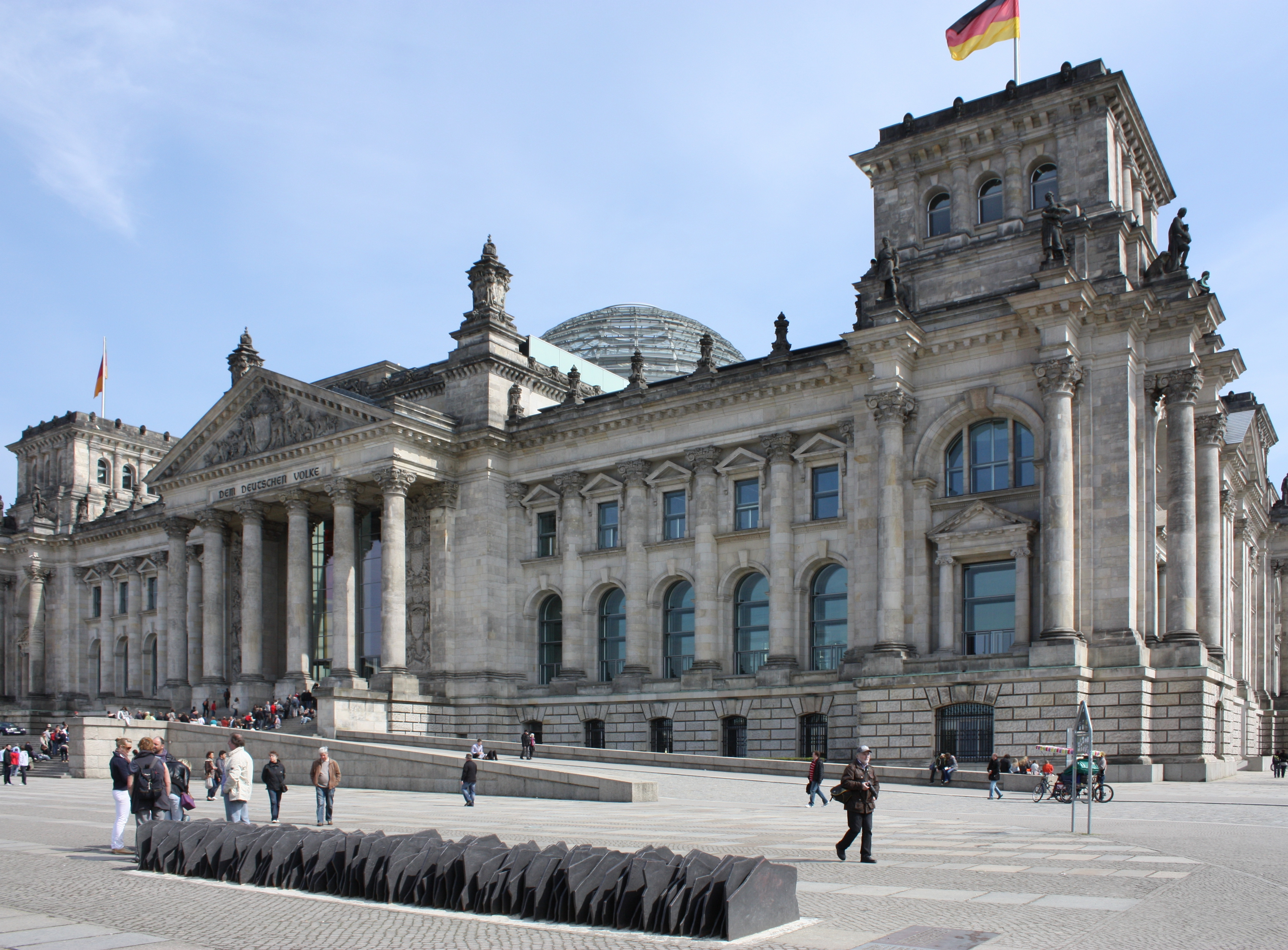
Memorial at the Reichstag

- in Mainz-Oberstadt and Frankfurt am Main-Heddernheim streets are named Franziska-Kessel-Straße.
- Since 1992, one of 96 cast iron plates, with the names, birth and death dates and places, commemorates Kessel in the Memorial to the Murdered Members of the Reichstag in Berlin.

== See also ==
- List of unsolved deaths
