= Artur Becker =

German politician (1905–1938)

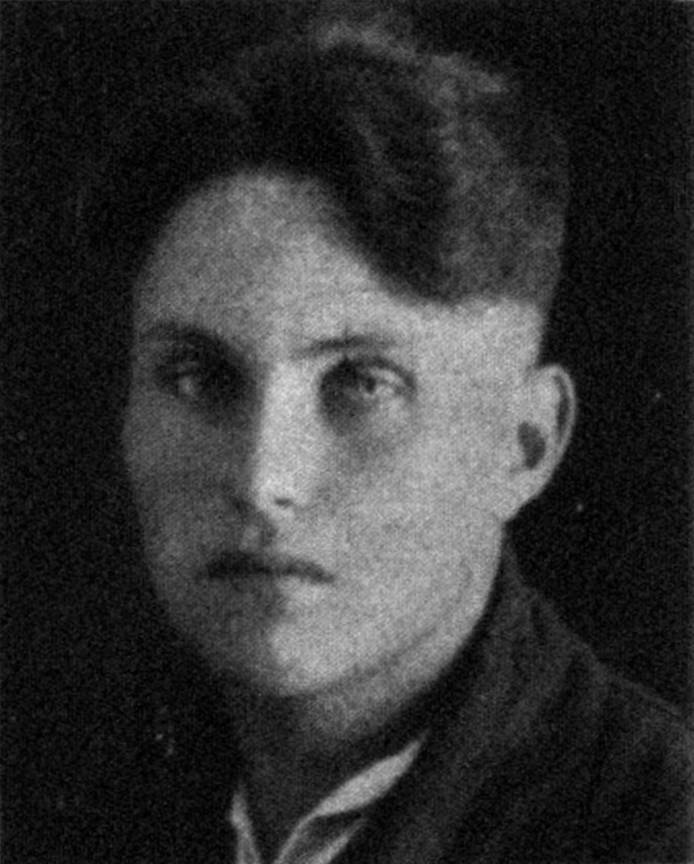
- Becker c. 1930

Member of the Reichstag for Düsseldorf West
- In office 13 October 1930 – 28 February 1933
- Preceded by: Multi-member district
- Succeeded by: Constituency abolished

Personal details
- Born: 12 May 1905 Remscheid, German Empire
- Died: 16 May 1938 (aged 33) Burgos, Spain
- Cause of death: Executed
- Party: Communist Party of Germany

Artur Becker (12 May 1905 – 16 May 1938) was a German communist politician and functionary of the Young Communist League of Germany (KJVD). Elected to the Reichstag in 1930, he fled the country after the Nazis came to power in 1933 and later volunteered in the International Brigades fighting for the Republicans in the Spanish Civil War.

During his time in Spain, Becker served as a political commissar in the Thälmann Battalion until he was wounded and captured by the Nationalist side in April 1938, and held for approximately one year before being executed.

Becker was upheld as a national hero in East Germany, and continues to be honored by the modern-day Free German Youth.

== Biography ==
Born into a working-class family, Becker's father was active in the Independent Social Democratic Party (USPD). After graduating from elementary school in Remscheid, Becker was trained as a locksmith and lathe operator. As a youth, he joined the Free Socialist Youth in 1919, the Young Communist League (KJVD) in 1920, and the Communist Party (KPD) in 1922.

During the occupation of the Ruhr area in 1923 he was involved in active resistance.

From 1926 he worked as a politician, first as leader of the communist youth on the Lower Rhine from 1926 to 1928, from 1928 as a member of the executive committee of the Communist Youth International, and from 1931 to 1932 as chairman of the central committee of the KJVD. In 1930 he was elected to the Reichstag on the Reich election proposal of the KPD. In the Reichstag elections in July and November 1932, as well as in March 1933, he was elected as one of the deputies for constituency 23 (Düsseldorf-West) elected. Since the mandates of the KPD in the parliament elected in 1933 were canceled before the constituent session, Becker was a member of the Reichstag from October 1930 to January 1933. He was the youngest member of the house.

As a political opponent of Nazism, he was forced to emigrate in 1933 and fled to Moscow.

He later was an international organizer for the defense of the Spanish Republic. From August 1937 he took part in the armed struggles, from the spring of 1938 as Political Commissar of the Thälmann Battalion of the International Brigades.

On April 13, 1938, he was severely wounded and taken prisoner by the Falangists. After several weeks of interrogation and torture, he is said to have been shot dead in a Burgos prison on May 16, 1938, although the exact date of his killing is not certain. According to a Gestapo report from August 1939, their officials were in Spain interrogating prisoners and also trying to find Becker.

== Legacy ==
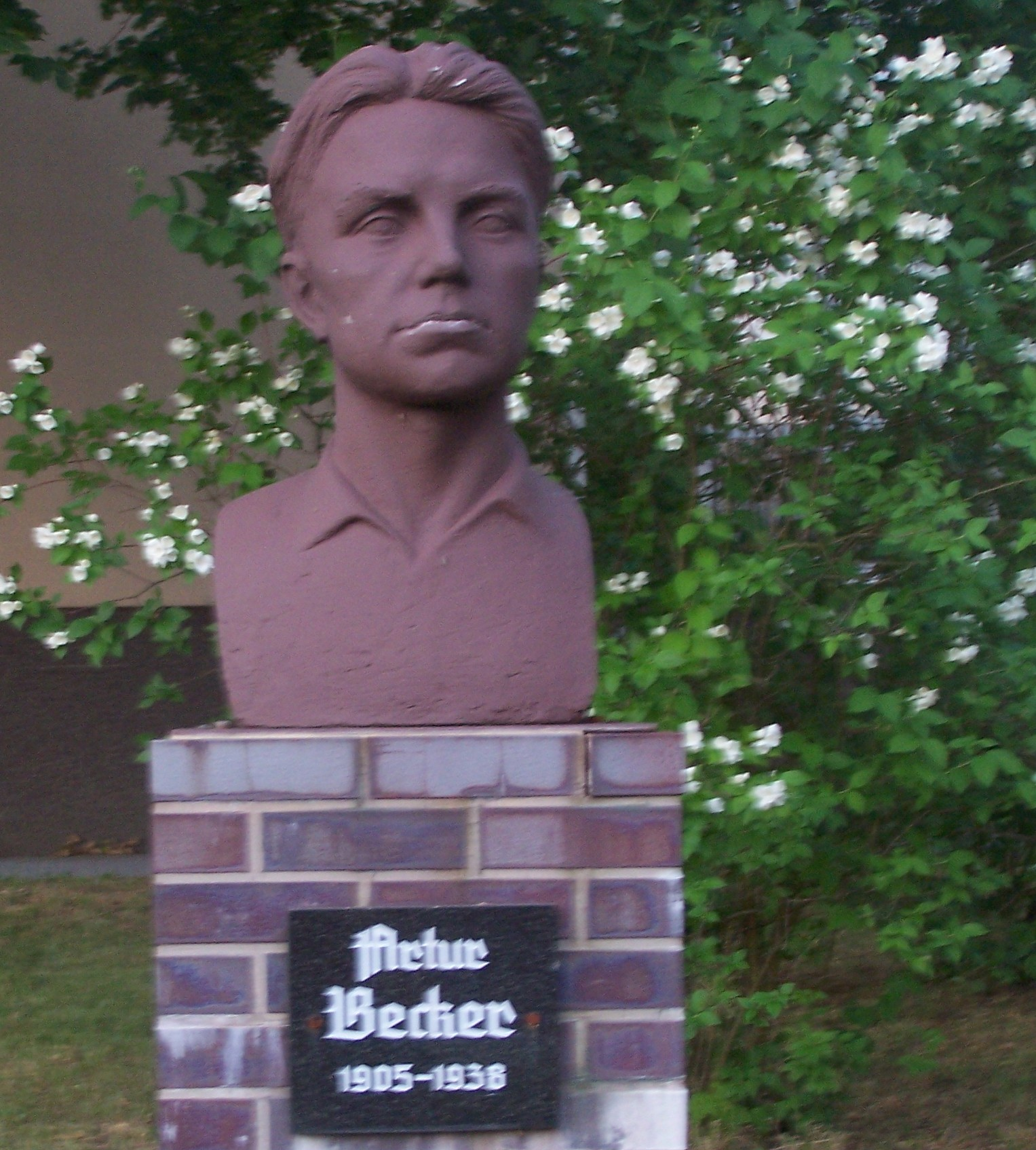
Artur Becker Monument, Trattendorf

After the end of World War II, Artur Becker received extensive honors in East Germany. Streets, schools, and industrial plants- such as the youth power plant "Artur Becker" Trattendorf- and the officers' college of the Ministry of the Interior were named after him.

The Land Forces of the National People's Army named a tank regiment in Becker's honour: Panzerregiment 8 (8th Tank Regiment) "Artur Becker," the sole armoured regiment of the 8th Motor-Rifle Division.

Since 1960, Freie Deutsche Jugend (Free German Youth) has presented the Artur Becker Medal in gold, silver, and bronze for outstanding achievements in the "socialist youth association".

After German reunification, most objects and streets named after Becker were largely renamed. However, there are still some streets and schools that bear his name.

In Berlin, one of the 96 memorial plaques for the members of the Reichstag murdered by the Nazi regime has commemorated Artur Becker since 1992. In September 2021, a memorial plaque was unveiled on Becker's former home at Schlichtallee 1 in Rummelsburg.
