= Memorial to the Murdered Members of the Reichstag =

Memorial to victims of Nazis in Berlin, Germany

Coordinates: 52°31′05″N 13°22′29″E

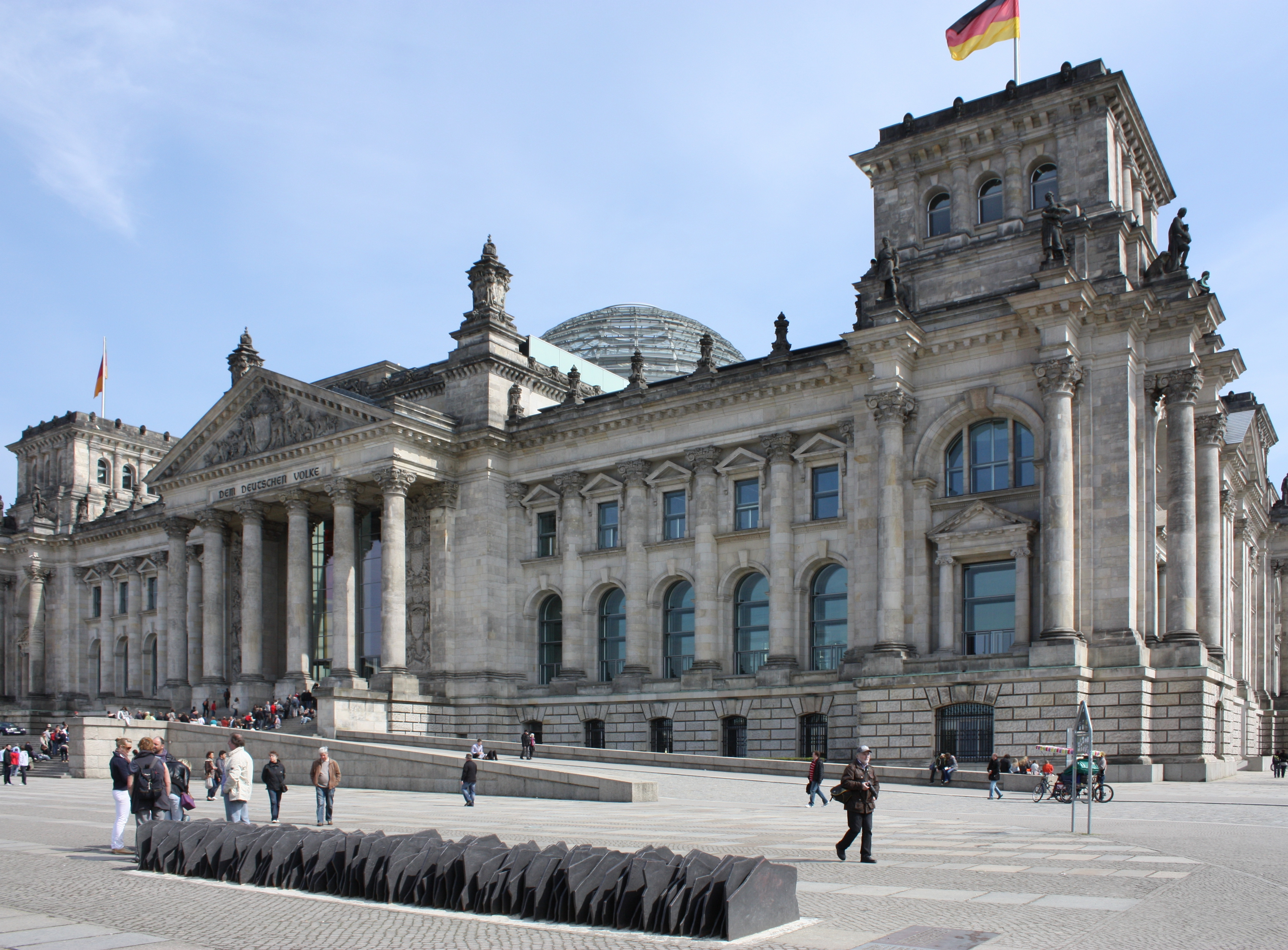
The memorial in front of the Reichstag in 2010

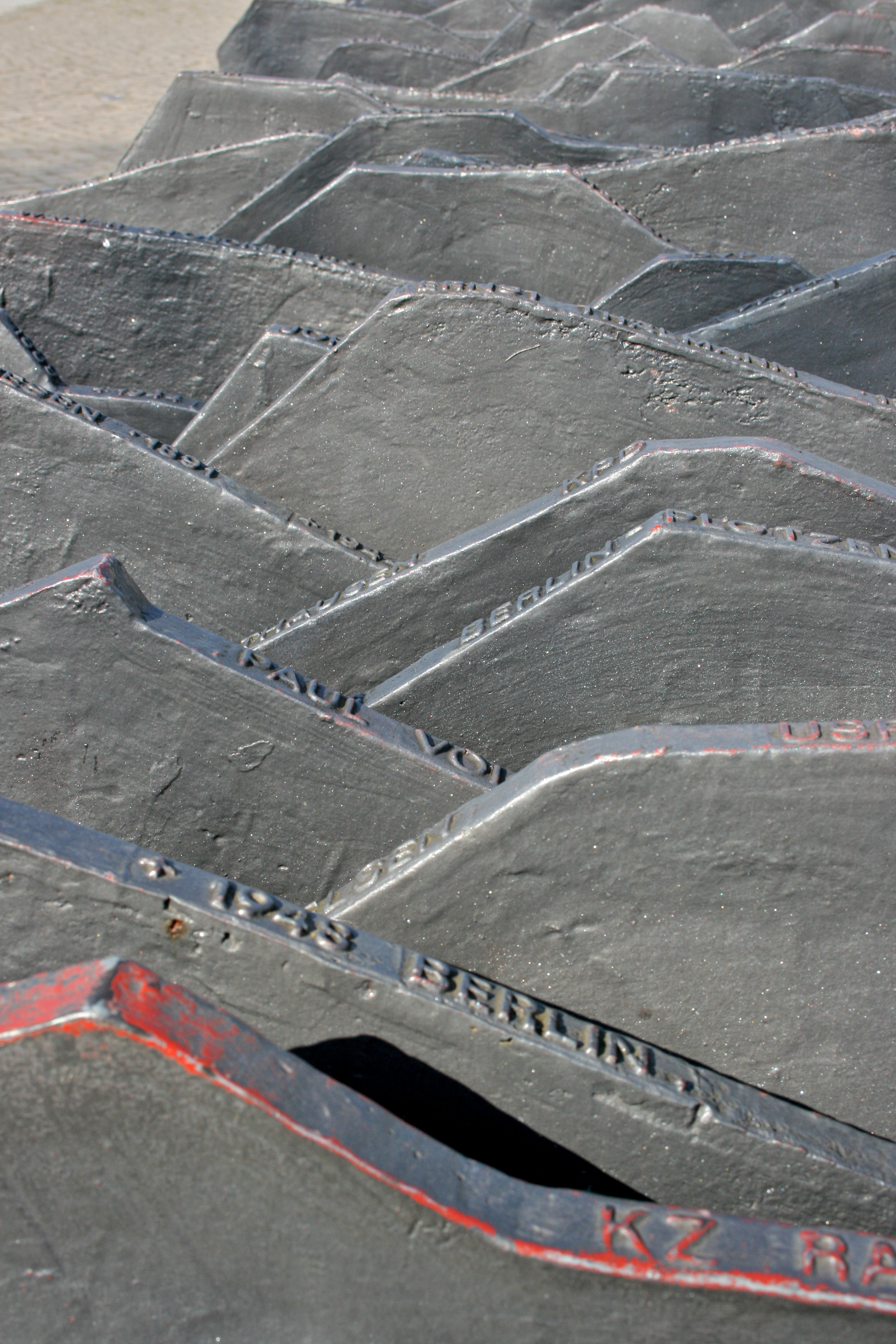
Detail of the memorial

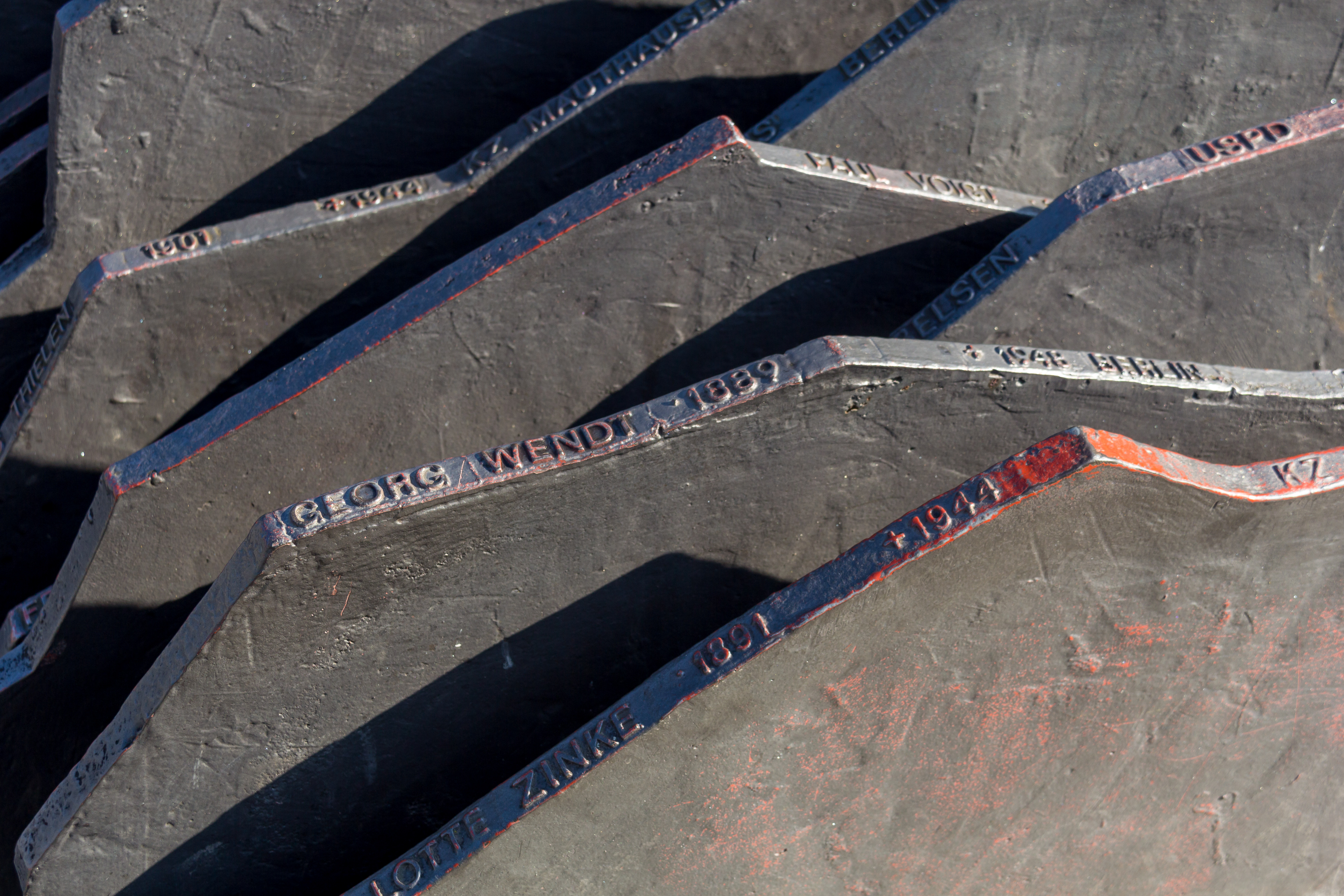
Detail of the memorial

The Memorial to the Murdered Members of the Reichstag is a memorial in Berlin, Germany. The memorial is located in front of the Reichstag building and commemorates 96 members of that parliament who were murdered by the Nazi regime. (It does not included those, like multiple victims on the Night of the Long Knives, who were themselves Nazis.) The idea of creating the monument started in the 1980s, and the memorial was erected in September 1992. It was designed by Dieter Appelt, Klaus W. Eisenlohr, Justus Müller, and Christian Zwirner. The memorial is made of 96 cast iron plates, with the names, birth and death dates and places engraved on the edges. It has been designed so that it can be extended if new names are to be added in the future.

== Commemorated people ==
Name	Birth	Death	Place of death	Political party/parties
Julius Adler	1894	1945	KZ Bergen-Belsen	KPD
Hans Adlhoch	1884	1945	Munich, before death march	BVP
Eduard Alexander	1881	1945	Transport to KZ Bergen-Belsen	KPD
Julius Aßmann	1868	1939	Bodino, Poland, assassinated	DVP
Elise Augustat	1889	1940	KZ Ravensbrück	KPD
Bernhard Bästlein	1894	1944	Zuchthaus Brandenburg	KPD
Artur Becker	1905	1938	Burgos, Spain, murdered	KPD
Anton Bias	1876	1945	KZ Dachau	SPD
Adolf Biedermann	1881	1933	Found dead near Recklinghausen	SPD
Conrad Blenkle	1901	1943	Zuchthaus Berlin-Plötzensee	KPD
Fritz Bockius	1882	1945	KZ Mauthausen	Zentrum
Clara Bohm-Schuch	1879	1936	Barnimstrasse women's prison	SPD
Eugen Bolz	1881	1945	Zuchthaus Berlin-Plötzensee	Zentrum
Rudolf Breitscheid	1874	1944	KZ Buchenwald	SPD
Lorenz Breunig	1882	1945	KZ Sachsenhausen	SPD
Conrad Broßwitz	1881	1945	KZ Dachau	SPD
Otto Eggerstedt	1886	1933	KZ Esterwegen	SPD
Eugen Eppstein	1878	1943	KZ Lublin	KPD
Helene Fleischer	1899	1941	Stadtroda	KPD
Albert Funk	1894	1933	Police headquarters, Recklinghausen	KPD
Otto Geiselhart	1890	1933	District court prison, Günzburg	SPD
Otto Gerig	1885	1944	KZ Buchenwald	Zentrum
Paul Gerlach	1888	1944	KZ Sachsenhausen	SPD
Ernst Grube (politician)	1890	1945	KZ Bergen-Belsen	KPD
Franz Haindl	1879	1941	Landesanstalt Sonnenstein-Pirna	DBP
Eduard Hamm	1879	1944	Gefängnis Berlin Lehrterstraße	DDP
Ernst Heilmann	1881	1940	KZ Buchenwald	SPD
Rudolf Hennig	1895	1944	KZ Sachsenhausen	KPD
Franz Herbert	1885	1945	KZ Mauthausen	BVP
Eugen Herbst	1903	1934	KZ Dachau	KPD
Christian Heuck	1892	1934	Prison Neumünster	KPD
Guido Heym	1882	1945	Shot by SS in Weimar	KPD
Rudolf Hilferding	1877	1941	Gefängnis Paris La-Sante	SPD
Gustav Hoch	1862	1942	KZ Theresienstadt	SPD
Lambert Horn	1899	1939	KZ Sachsenhausen	KPD
Friedrich Husemann	1873	1935	KZ Esterwegen	SPD
Albert Janka	1907	1933	KZ Reichenbach	KPD
Heinrich Jasper	1875	1945	KZ Bergen-Belsen	SPD
Friedrich Jendrosch	1890	1944	KZ Sachsenhausen	KPD
Reinhold Jürgensen	1898	1934	KZ Fuhlsbüttel	KPD
Eugen Kaiser	1879	1945	KZ Dachau	SPD
Albert Kayser	1898	1944	KZ Buchenwald	KPD
Franziska Kessel	1906	1934	Zuchthaus Mainz	KPD
Anton Krzikalla	1887	1944	KZ Sachsenhausen	KPD
Franz Künstler	1888	1942	Berlin, Spätfolgen des KZ Lichtenburg	SPD
Max Lademann	1896	1941	KZ Sachsenhausen	KPD
Julius Leber	1891	1945	Zuchthaus Berlin-Plötzensee	SPD
Paul Lejeune-Jung	1882	1944	Zuchthaus Berlin-Plötzensee	DNVP/ChrNA/KVP
Richard Lipinski	1867	1936	Bennewitz	SPD
Karl Mache	1882	1934	KZ Kislau	SPD
Max Maddalena	1895	1943	Prison Brandenburg-Görden	KPD
Ludwig Marum	1882	1934	KZ Kislau	SPD
Stefan Meier	1889	1944	KZ Mauthausen	SPD
August Merges	1870	1945	Braunschweig Wolfenbüttel prison	SPD
Franz Metz	1878	1945	KZ Dachau	SPD
Julius Moses	1868	1942	KZ Theresienstadt	SPD
Arthur Nagel	1890	1945	KZ Bergen-Belsen	KPD
Theodor Neubauer	1890	1945	Brandenburg-Görden prison	KPD
Franz Petrich	1889	1945	Sonnenburg prison	SPD
Andreas Portune	1875	1945	Roslau	SPD
Friedrich Puchta	1883	1945	KZ Dachau	SPD
Ernst Putz	1896	1933	Berlin-Moabit prison	KPD
Siegfried Rädel	1893	1943	Zuchthaus Berlin-Plötzensee	KPD
Paul Redlich	1893	1944	KZ Sonnenburg	KPD
Walter Reek	1878	1933	Danzig prison	SPD
Ernst Reinke	1891	1943	KZ Flossenbürg	KPD
Max Richter	1881	1945	Neustädter Bucht, transportation to KZ Neuengamme	SPD
Theodor Roeingh	1882	1945	KZ Sachsenhausen	Zentrum
Julius Rosemann	1878	1933	Hamm police jail	SPD
Karl Sattler	1896	1945	KZ Bergen-Belsen	KPD
John Schehr	1896	1934	Schäferberg/Kilometerberg: shot "escaping"	KPD
Michael Schnabrich	1880	1939	KZ Sachsenhausen	SPD
Ernst Schneller	1890	1944	KZ Sachsenhausen	KPD
Ernst Schneppenhorst	1881	1945	Gefängnis Berlin Lehrterstraße	SPD
Werner Scholem	1895	1940	KZ Buchenwald	KPD
Georg Schumann	1886	1945	Detention in Dresden	KPD
Walter Schütz	1897	1933	Murdered in Königsberg by the SA	KPD
Hugo Sinzheimer	1875	1945	Overveen Gemeente Bloemendaal (Niederlande)	SPD
Willi Skamira	1897	1945	Brandenburg-Görden prison	KPD
Fritz Soldmann	1878	1945	KZ Buchenwald	SPD
Robert Stamm	1900	1937	Berlin-Plötzensee prison	KPD
Johannes Stelling	1877	1933	District court prison, Berlin-Köpenick	SPD
Franz Stenzer	1900	1933	KZ Dachau	KPD
Walter Stöcker	1891	1939	KZ Buchenwald	USPD, KPD
Georg Streiter	1884	1945	KZ Ravensbrück	DVP
August Streufert	1887	1944	KZ Neuengamme	SPD
Hermann Tempel	1889	1944	Oldenburg, Haftfolgen Wölfenbüttel prison	SPD
Johanna Tesch	1875	1945	KZ Ravensbrück	SPD
Ernst Thälmann	1886	1944	KZ Buchenwald	KPD
Mathias Thesen	1891	1944	KZ Sachsenhausen	KPD
Nikolaus Thielen	1901	1944	KZ Mauthausen	KPD
Fritz Voigt	1882	1945	Berlin-Plötzensee prison	SPD
Paul Voigt	1876	1944	Murdered in Berlin	SPD
Paul Wegmann	1889	1945	KZ Bergen-Belsen	USPD
Georg Wendt	1889	1948 (Note: Although Wendt died some time after the fall of the Nazi regime, he died prematurely (age 58) due to harsh treatment while imprisoned in Brandenburg-Görden Prison in 1933 and so is included among the victims.)	Berlin, before Brandenburg prison	SPD
Lotte Zinke	1891	1944	KZ Ravensbrück	KPD
