= Julius Rosemann =

German politician (1878–1933)

Julius Rosemann (8 November 1878 – 4 May 1933) was a German politician of the Independent Social Democratic Party.

== Life and career ==
Julius Rosemann was born in Essen. After attending Volksschule, he earned his living as a miner. Around 1895 he joined the Social Democratic Party (SPD). In 1905 he was married. Following the split within the SPD in 1917, he joined the left-wing faction which formed the Independent Social Democratic Party (USPD). From June 1920 until May 1924 he sat as a deputy for the USPD in the first Reichstag parliament of the Weimar Republic, in which he represented Electoral District 25 (Dusseldorf-East). In later years Rosemann worked as a trade union organizer in Hamm.

After the Nazi seizure of power in the spring of 1933, Rosemann was arrested on May 2. After severe mistreatment in prison, he allegedly took his own life in the Hamm Prison on May 4. By contrast, a contemporary source claimed Rosemann had been shot while in custody.

== Memorials ==
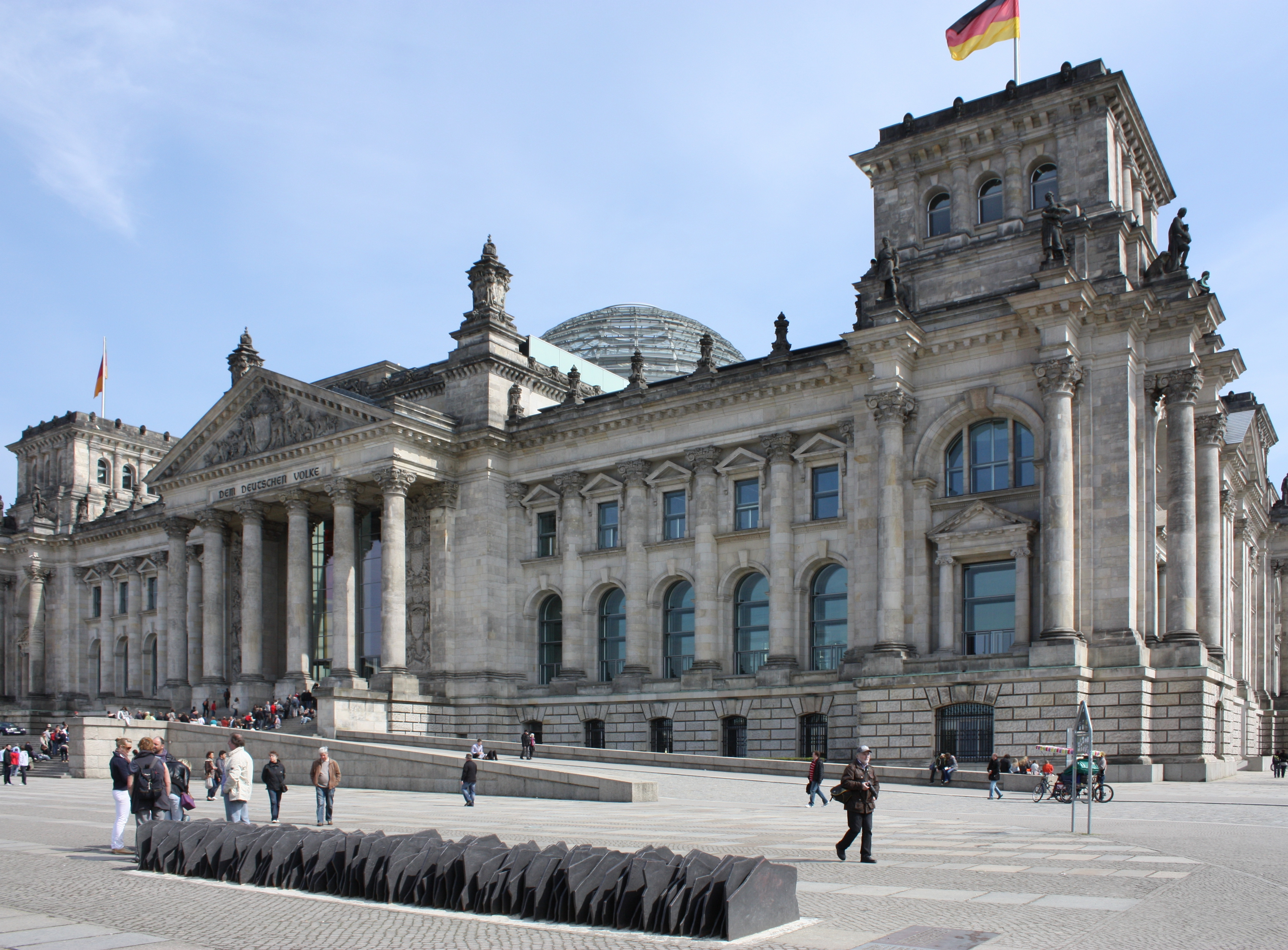
Memorial plaque at the Reichstag

Since 1992, Rosemann's name appears on one of the 96 plaques in the Memorial to the Murdered Members of the Reichstag, on the corner of Scheidemannstraße / Republic Square in Berlin near the Reichstag building.

== Publications ==
- Die Sechsstundenschicht im Bergbau. Referat und Korreferat auf der außerordentlichen Generalversammlung in Bochum, s.l.e.a. [Bochum 1920]. (with Otto Hue)

== Links ==
- Literature by and about Julius Rosemann in the German National Library catalogue
- Information about Julius Rosemann in the Reichstag database
