= Julius Adler (politician) =

German politician (1894–1945)

Julius Adler (23 January 1894 – 8 April 1945) was a German politician and member of the Communist Party of Germany. A member of the Reichstag from 1928 to 1933, he was later detained by the Gestapo and died in the Bergen-Belsen concentration camp.

== Life ==
Julius Adler was born in Neunkirchen in the Prussian Rhine Province (now Saarland), the son of a miner. By occupation a crane operator, he was also an active member and official within the Communist Party. In 1924 he became a city councillor in Hamborn and following the incorporation of the former into Duisburg, became a city councillor there. From 1928 to 1933 he was a member of the Reichstag.

After the Nazi seizure of power, Julius Adler was arrested on 15 March 1933 in Essen, taken into "protective custody", and imprisoned at the Lichtenburg concentration camp. According to an arrest warrant, he was imprisoned in Torgau from August 1934 onwards. On January 11, 1935, the Third Criminal Division of the High Regional Court Hamm (OLG Hamm) sentenced Adler to 18 months in prison for treason. The prosecution alleged that Adler had participated in three meetings of communist officials in March 1933. In 1937 he was discharged from Börgermoor concentration camp but was arrested twice again in the same year. After the beginning of the war in September 1939, Adler was arrested again by the Gestapo and imprisoned in the Sachsenhausen concentration camp. In 1945 he was transported to Bergen-Belsen, where he died after contracting typhus. The exact date of his death is not known; in 1949 the Hamborn District Court ruled he had died on 8 April 1945.

== Honours ==
=== Memorial cards on the Reichstag ===
Since 1992, Adler's name appears on one of the 96 plaques in the Memorial to the Murdered Members of the Reichstag, on the corner of Scheidemannstraße / Republic Square in Berlin near the Reichstag building. Another memorial to Julius Adler is located in the Berlin borough of Lichtenberg in the Memorial to the Socialists. Additionally during the time of the German Democratic Republic, a speedboat (183/1, type P6) of the Volksmarine of the GDR was named after Julius Adler. This boat was in service from 8 October 1957 to 31 May 1968.

== Literature ==
- Hermann Weber, Andreas Herbst : Deutsche Kommunisten (German Communists). Biographical handbook 1918 to 1945. Second edition, revised and greatly extended. Karl Dietz Verlag, Berlin 2008, ISBN 978-3-320-02130-6 (Online).
- Rudolf Tappe, Manfred Tietz (eds.): Crime Scene Duisburg I. 1933 - 1945 resistance and persecution in Nazi Germany. Plaintext Verlag, Essen, 1989, ISBN 3-88474-140-3 , p 292ff.
