= Artists in The Aesthetics of Resistance =

People included in novel by Peter Weiss

The artists in The Aesthetics of Resistance, of which there is a multitude that Peter Weiss included in his novel The Aesthetics of Resistance, form a kind of musée imaginaire (imagined museum) with more than a hundred named artists and just as many works of art, mainly visual arts and literature, but also performing arts and music.

== List of artists ==
The following list is a supplement to the list of artworks in The Aesthetics of Resistance and contains about one hundred names of artists who are discussed, named, enumerated or included in detail in the novel. They are largely arranged in the order of their appearance in the book. Exceptions are motifs, which are given a more detailed description on later pages after a brief mention.

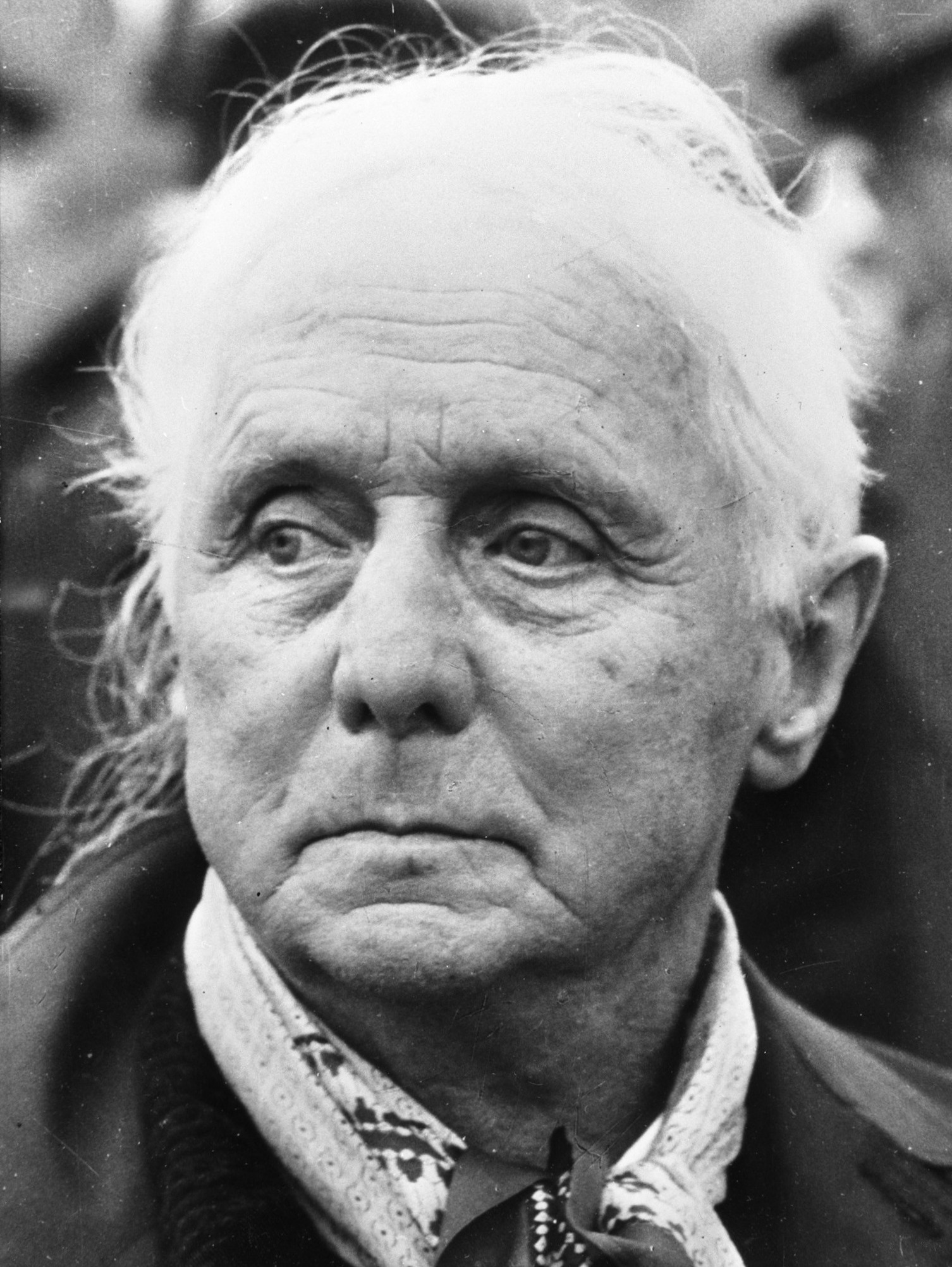
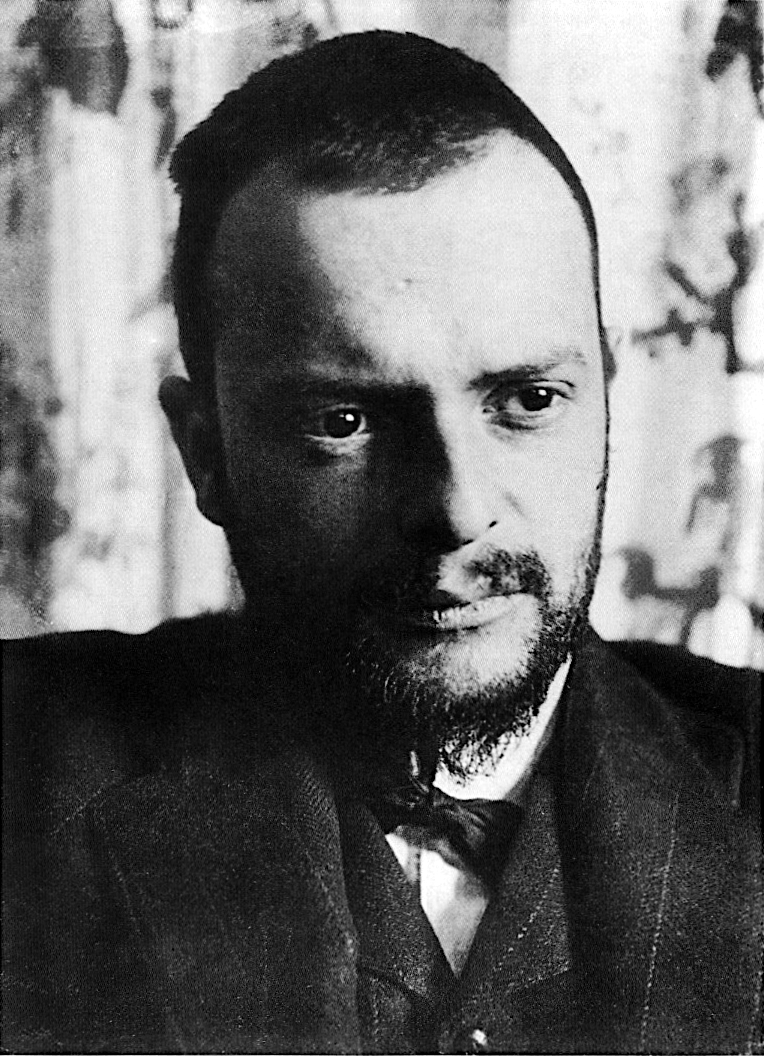
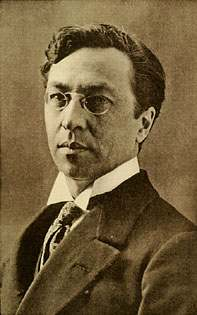
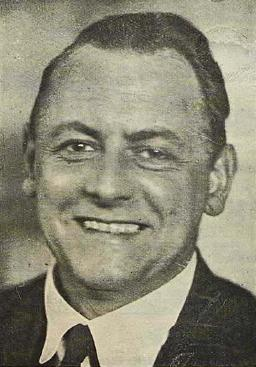
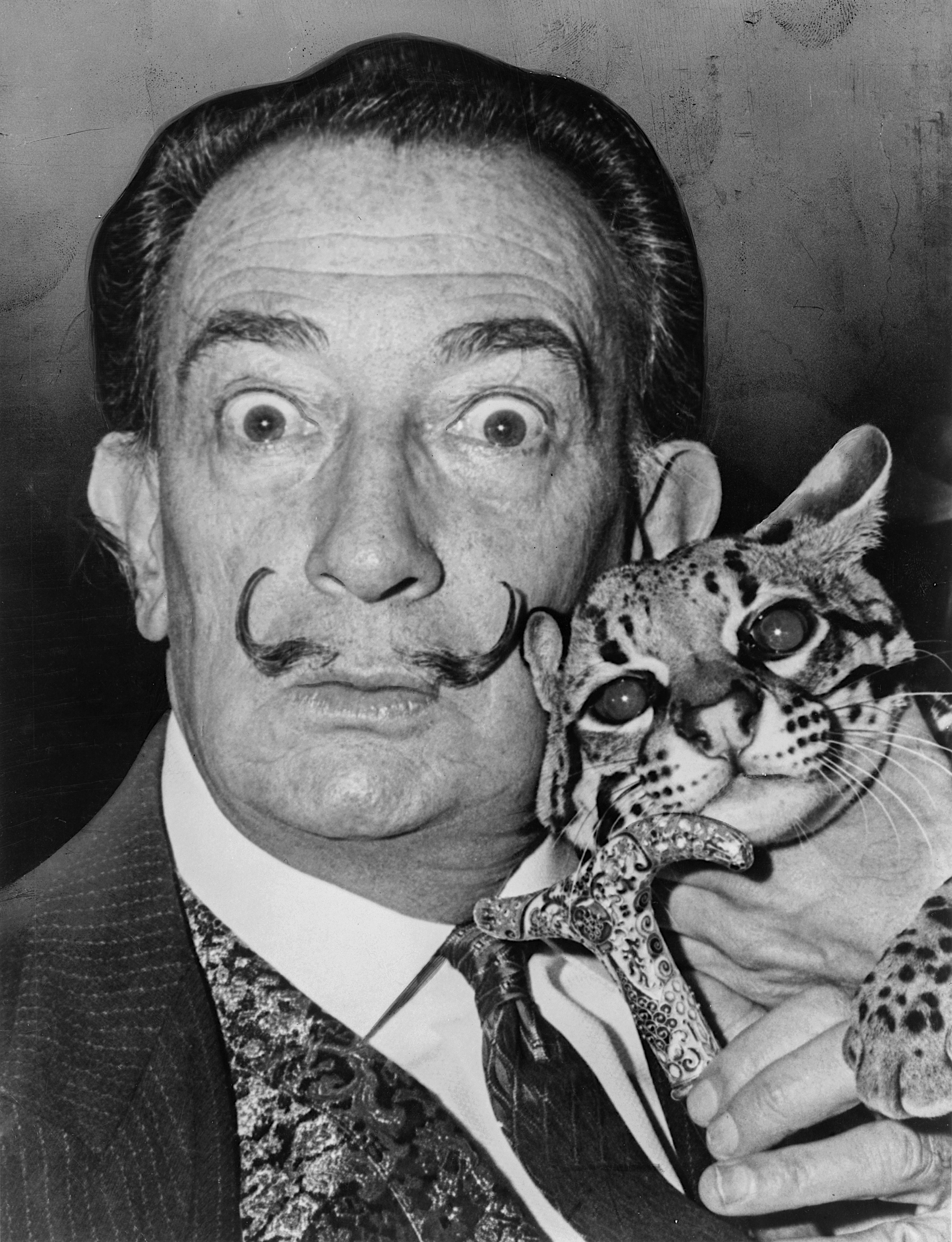
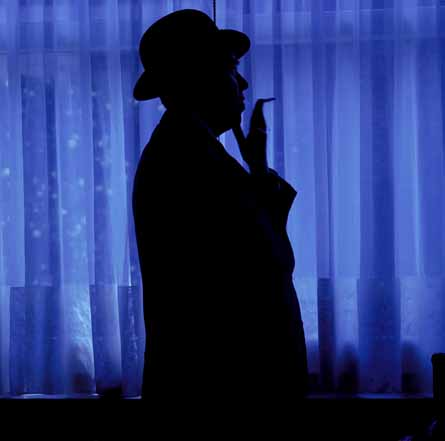
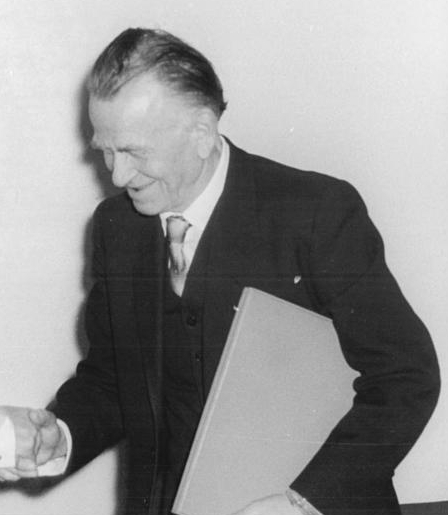
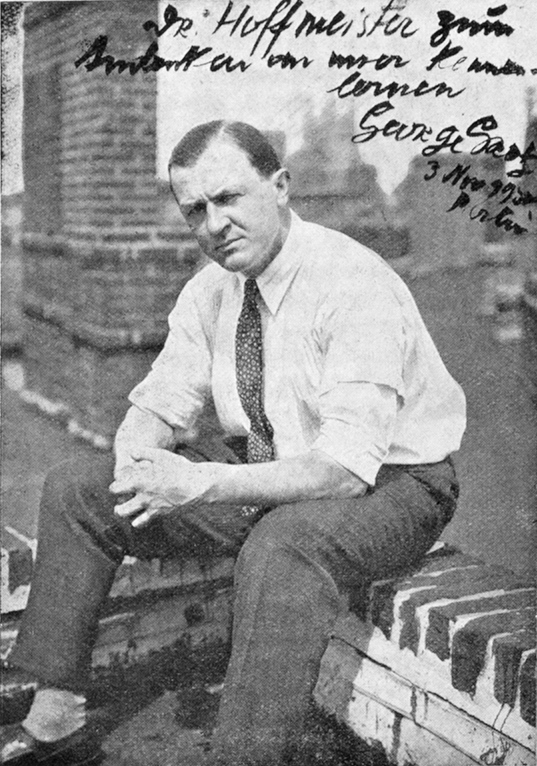
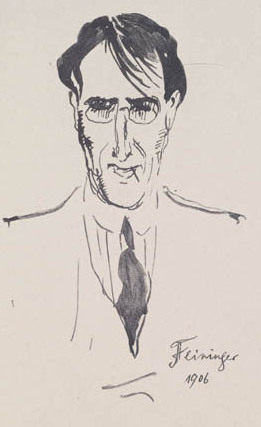
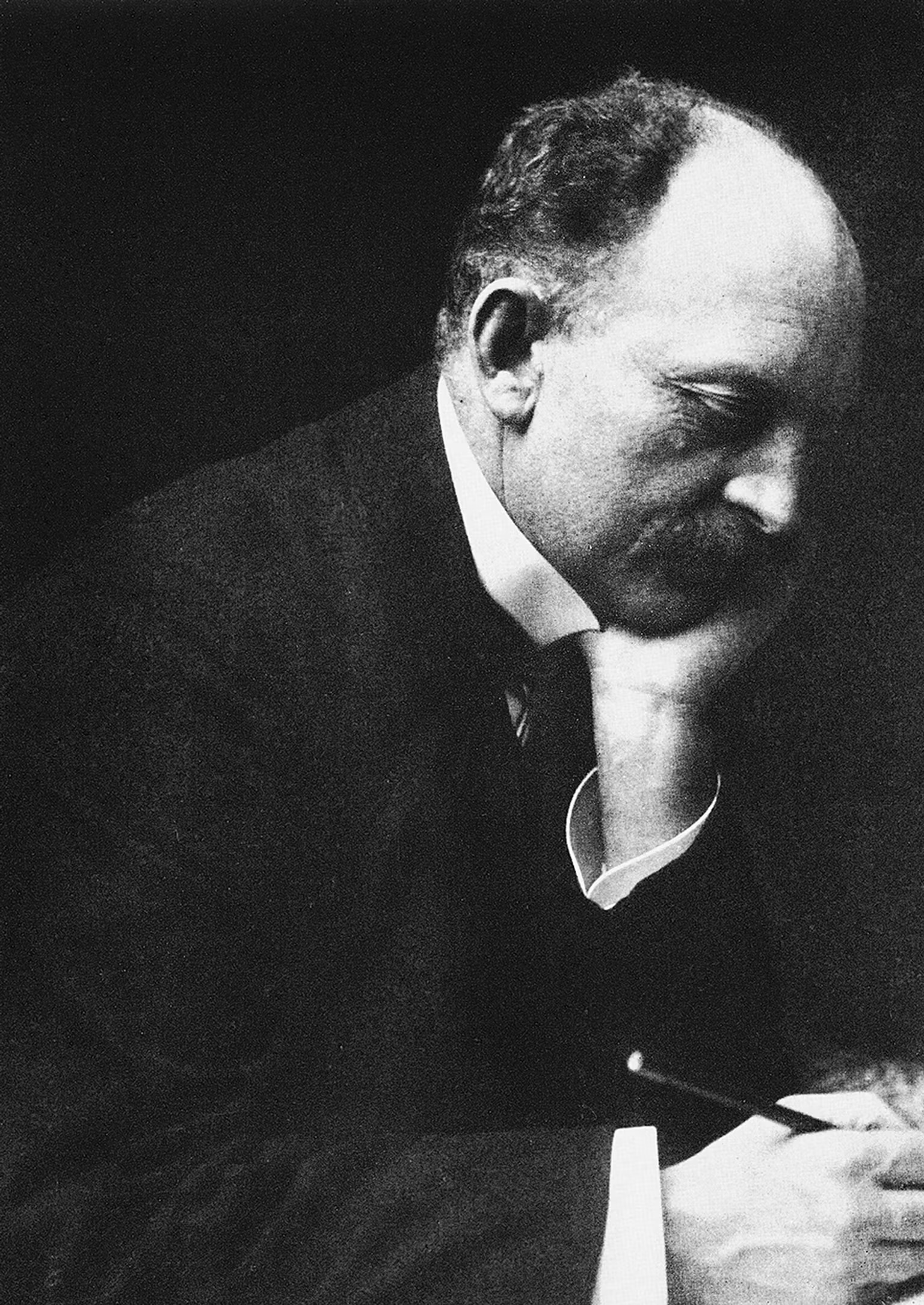
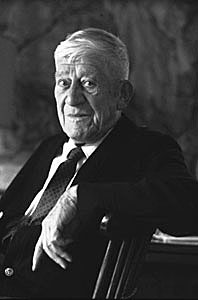
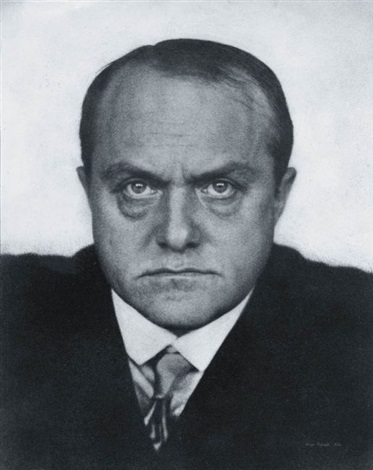
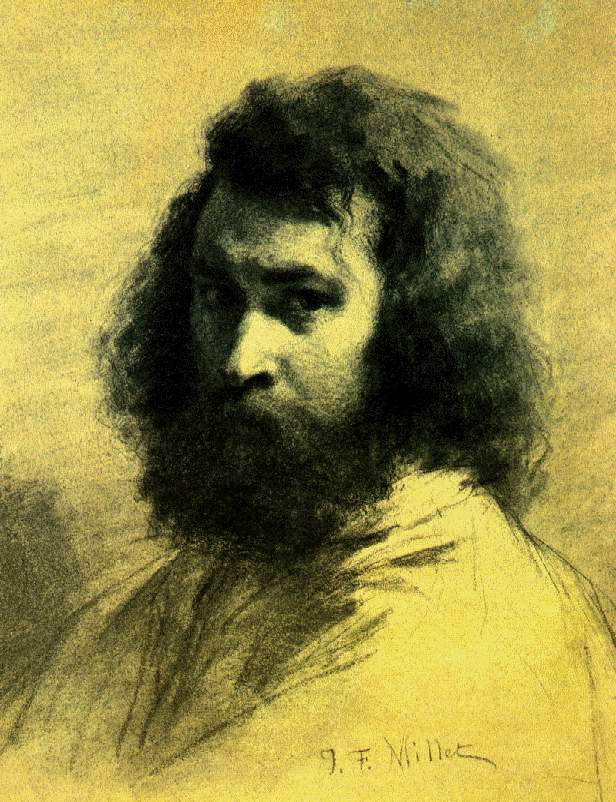
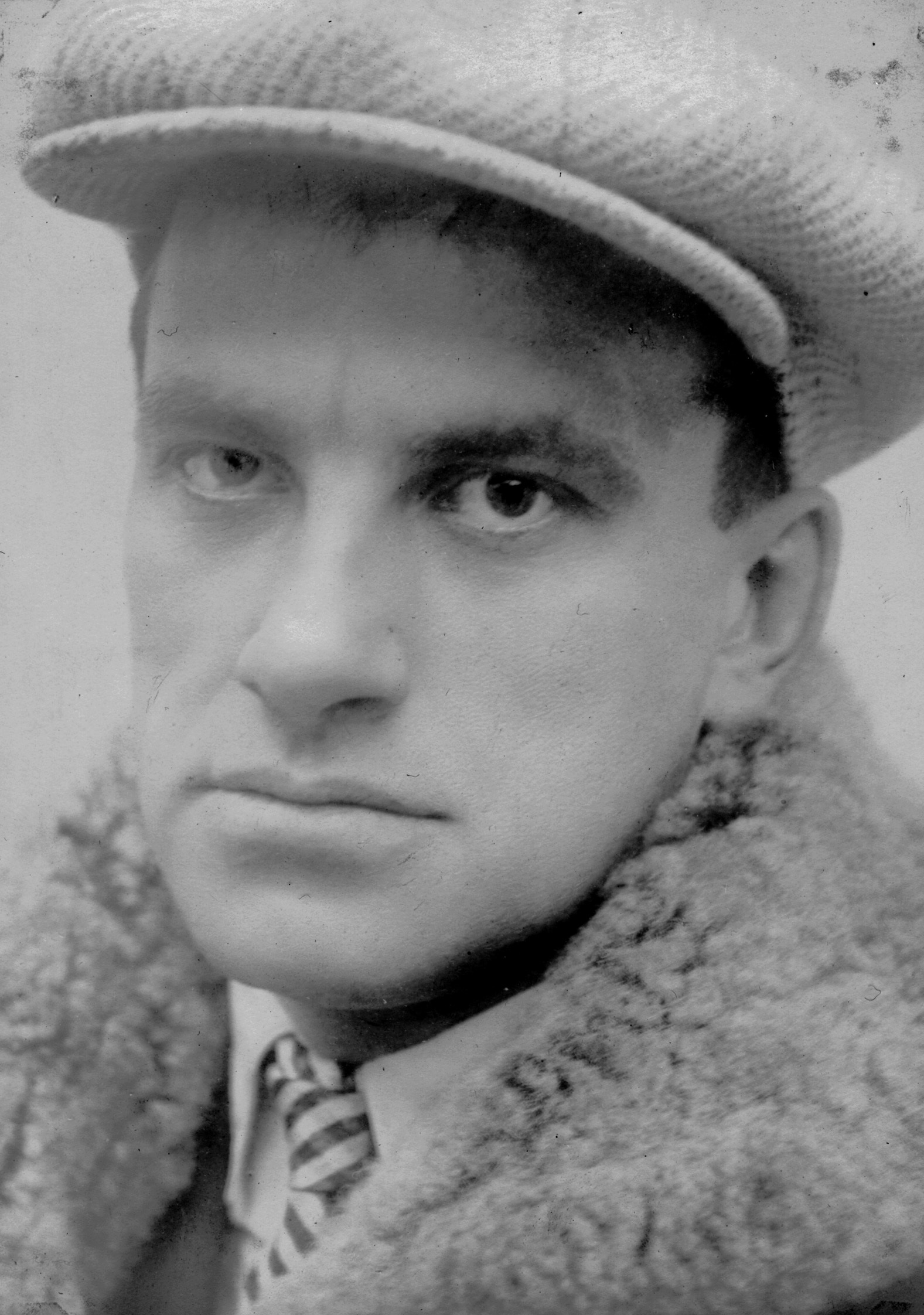
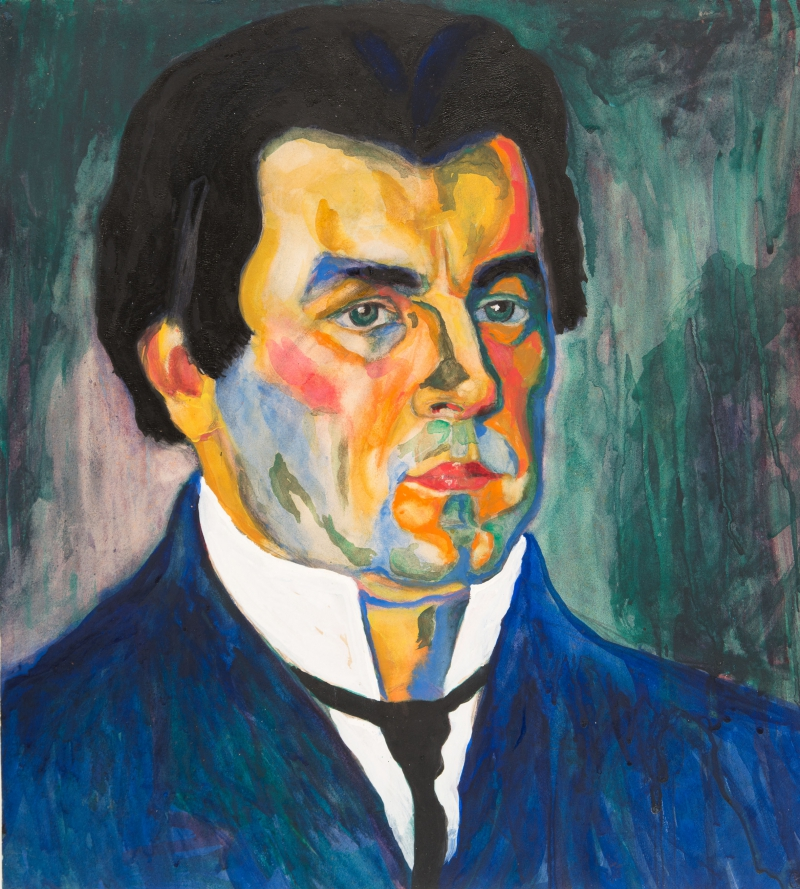
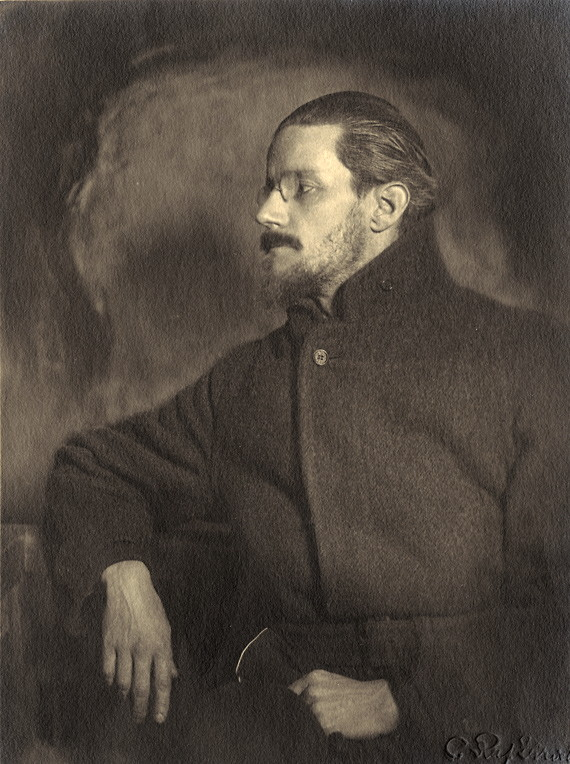
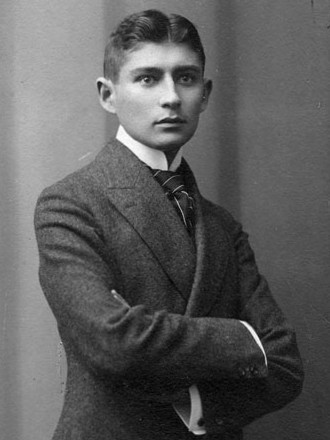
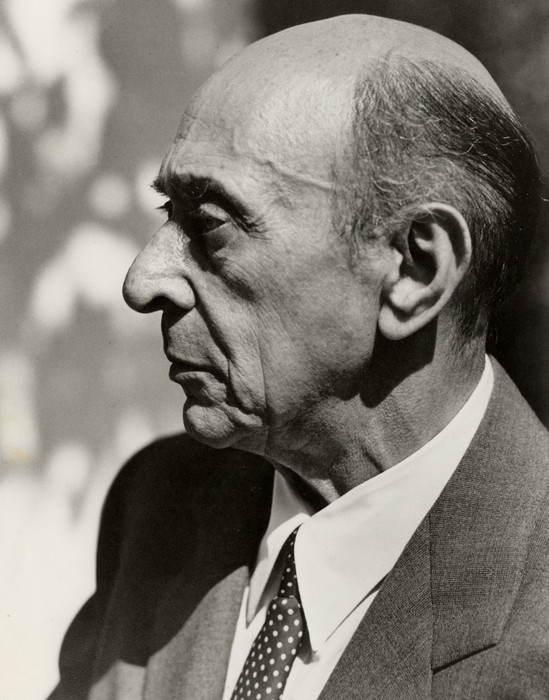
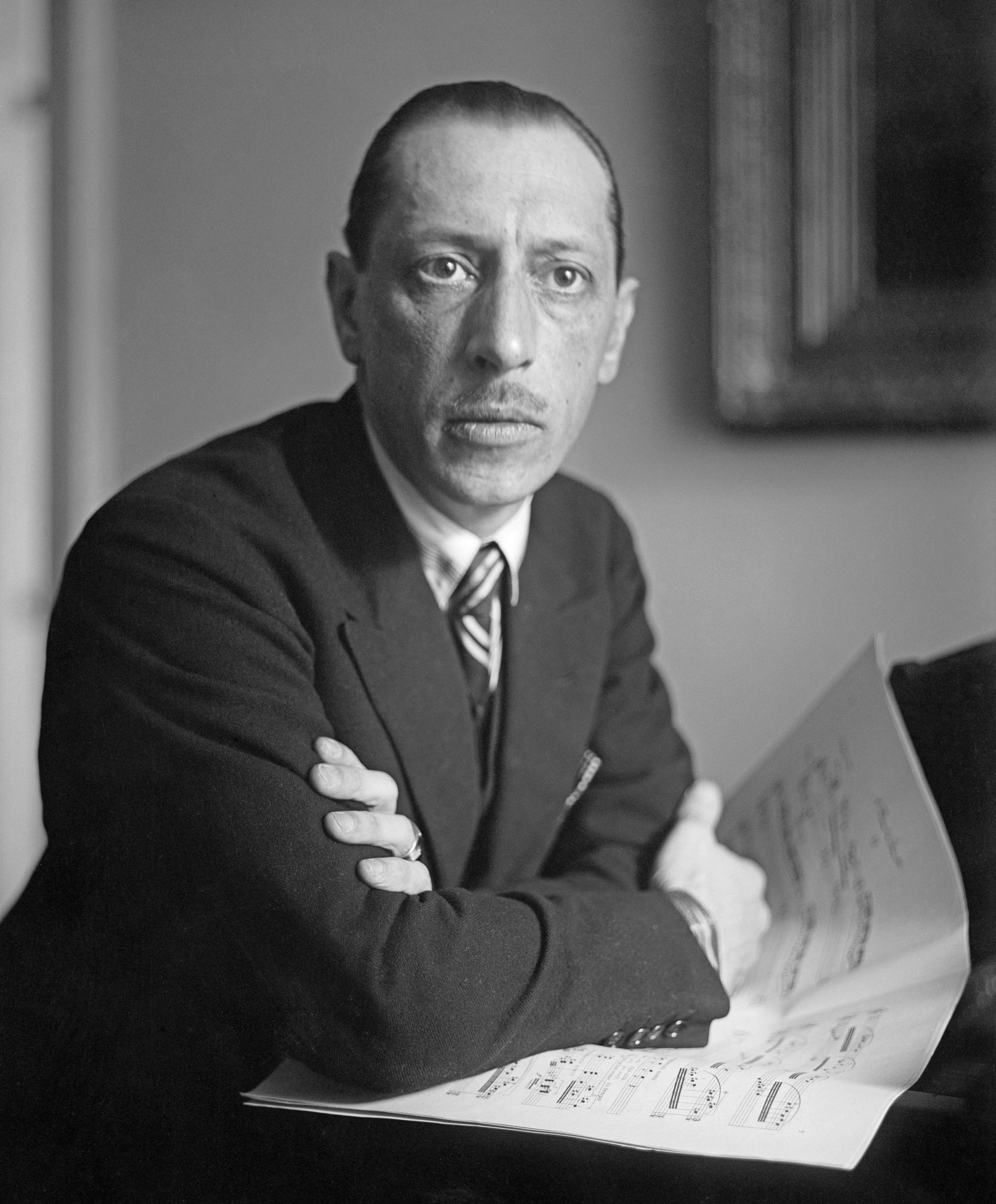
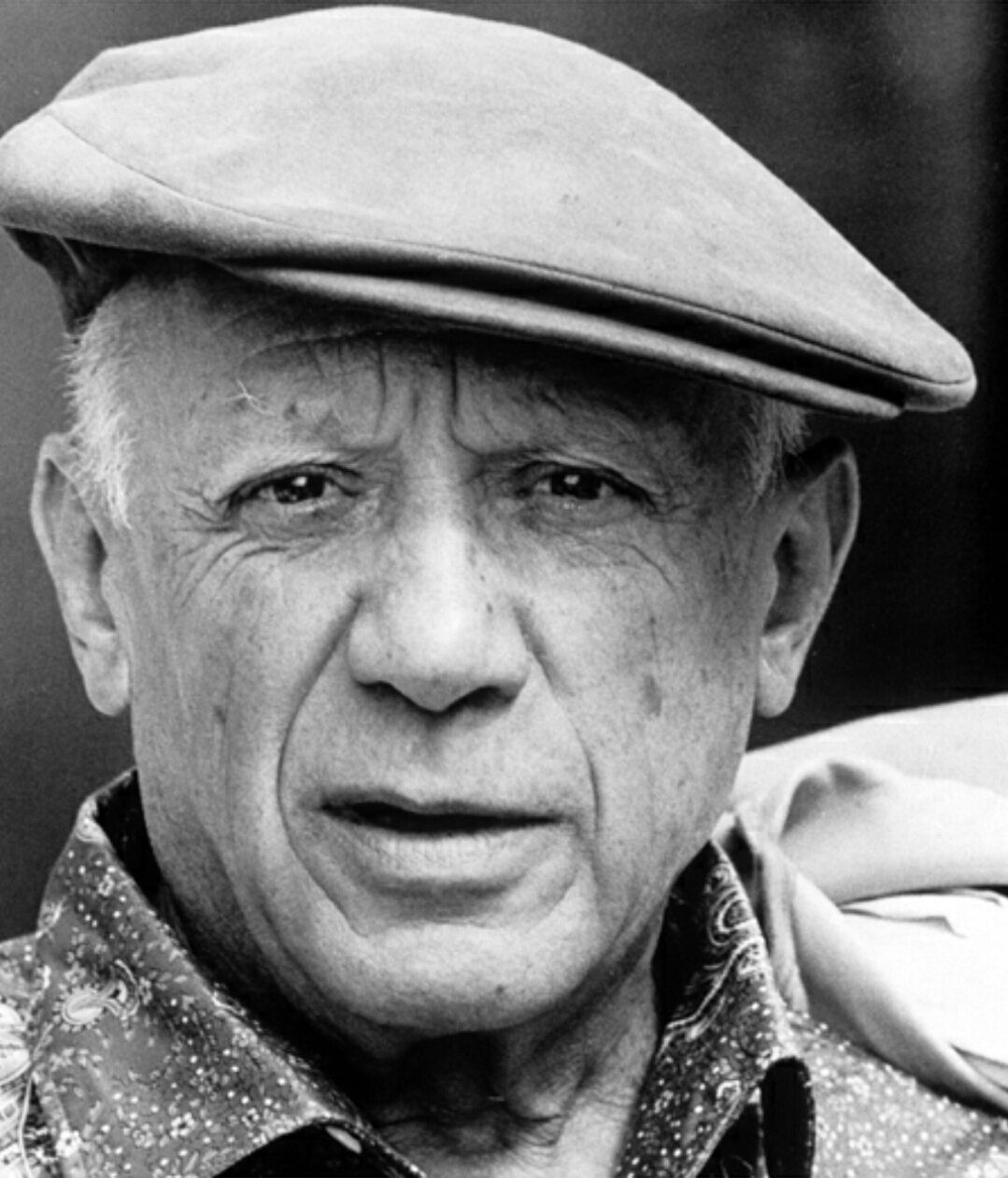
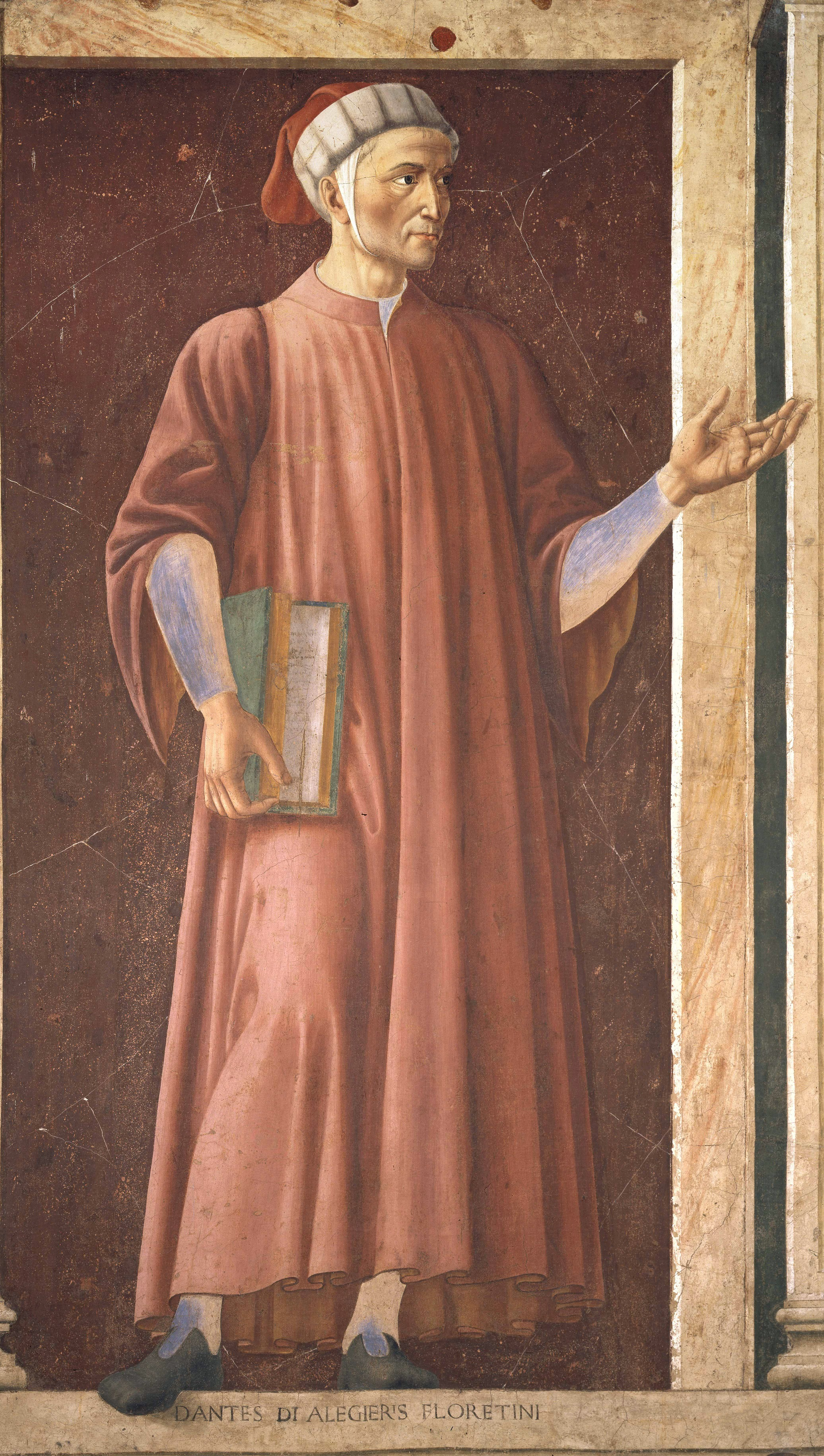
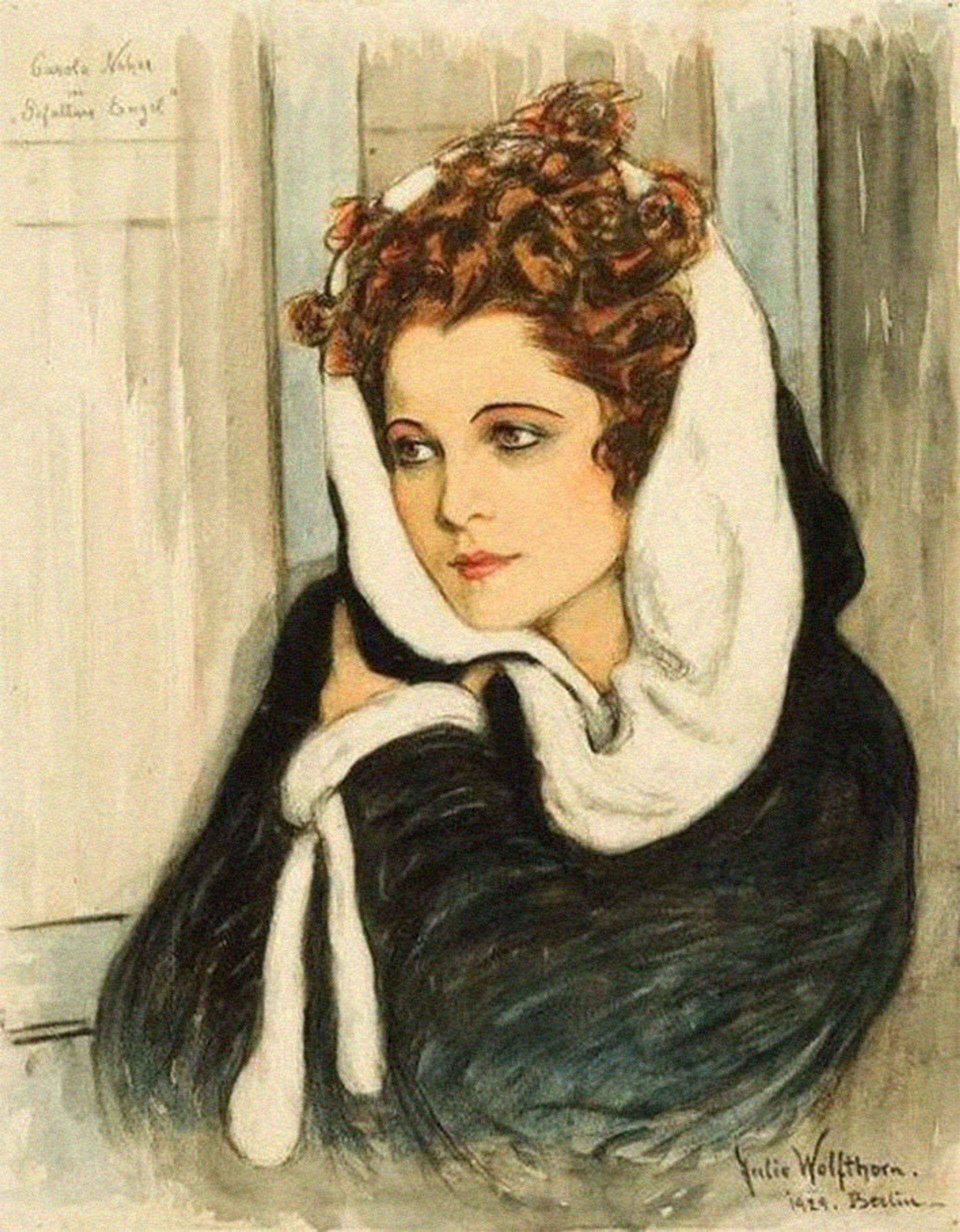
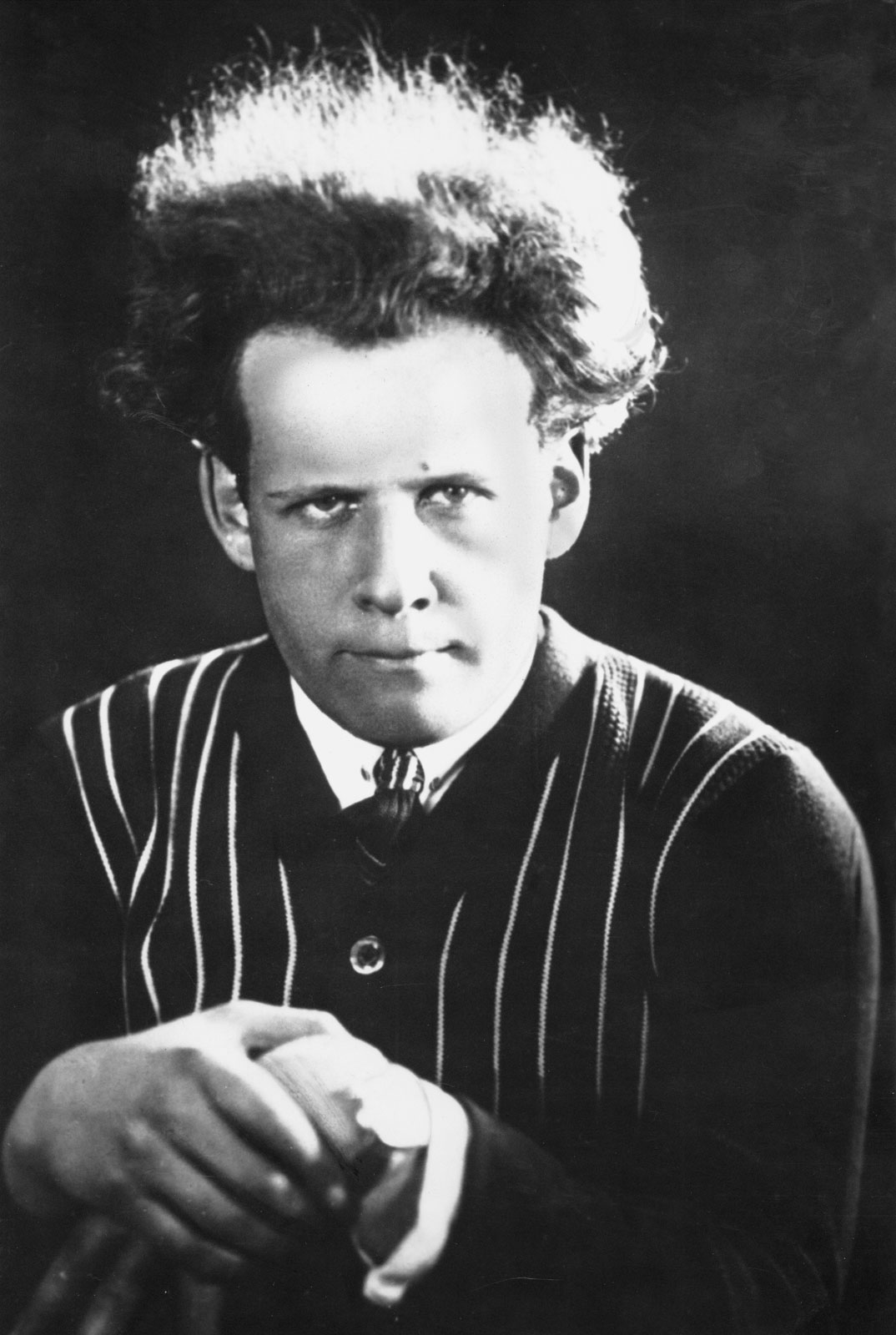
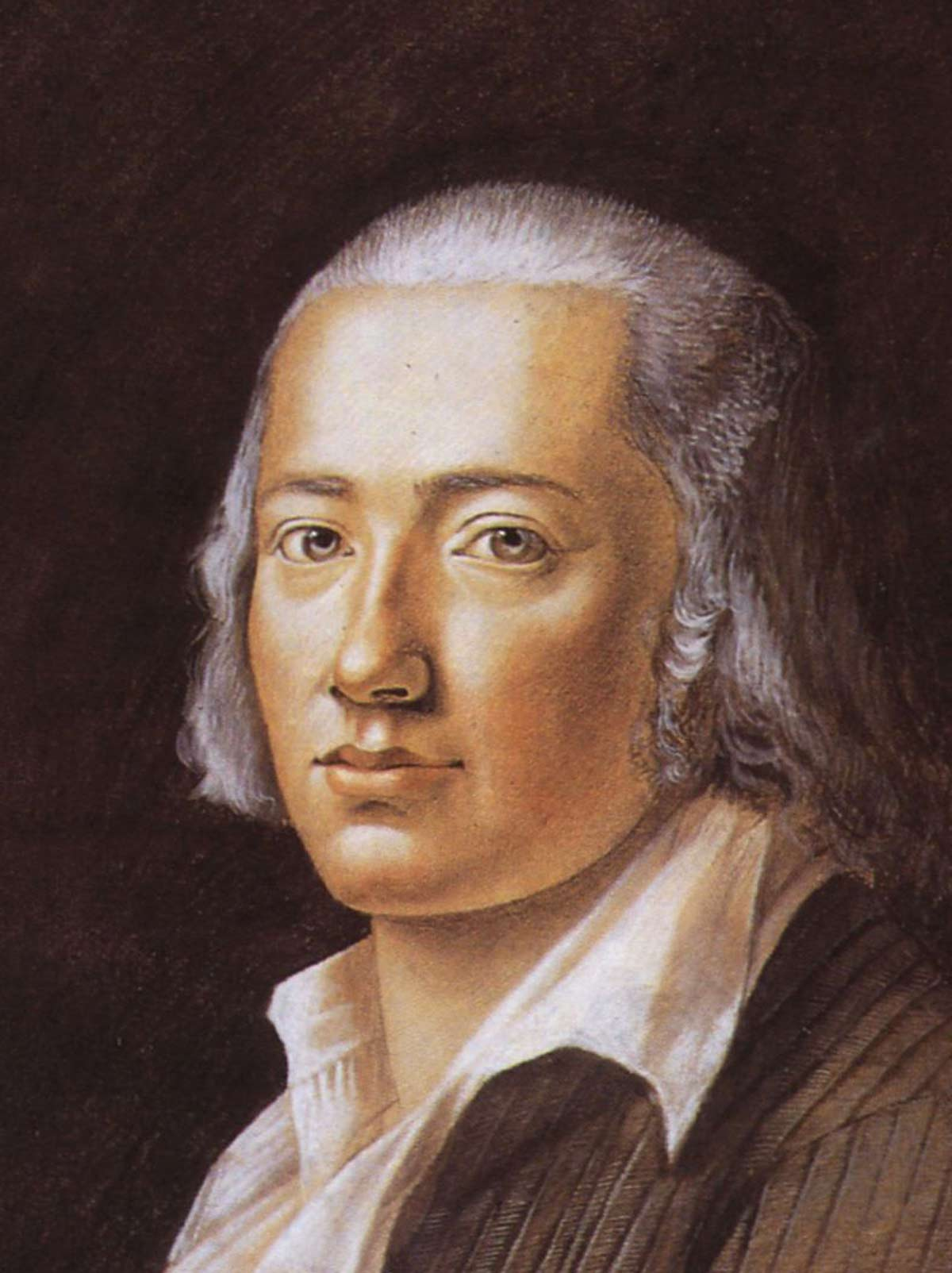
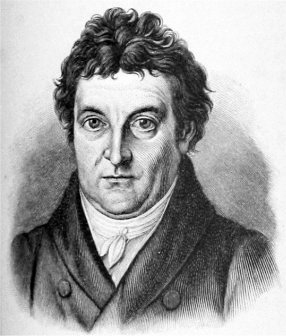
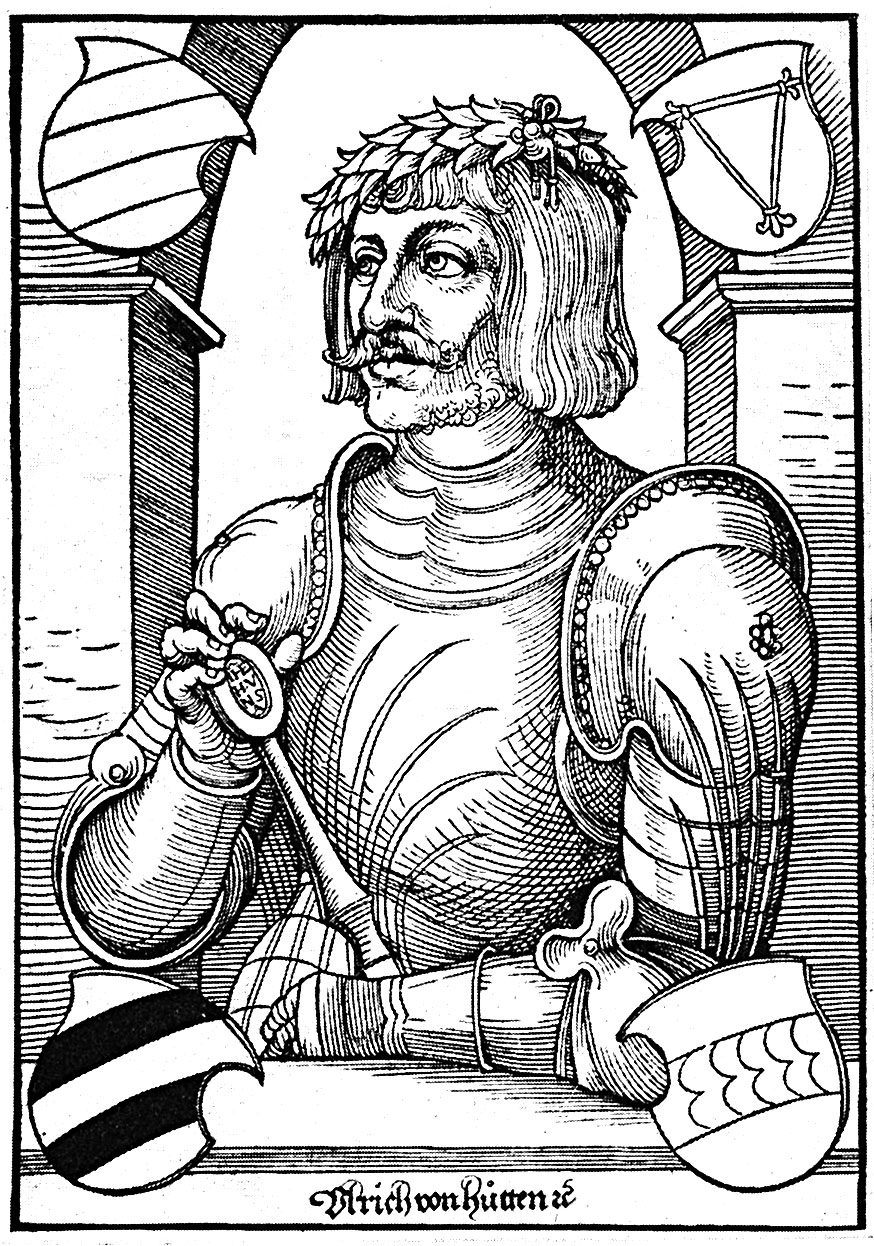
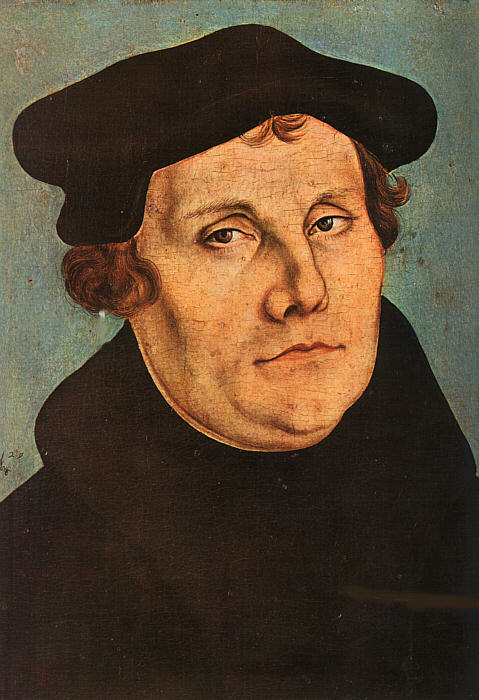
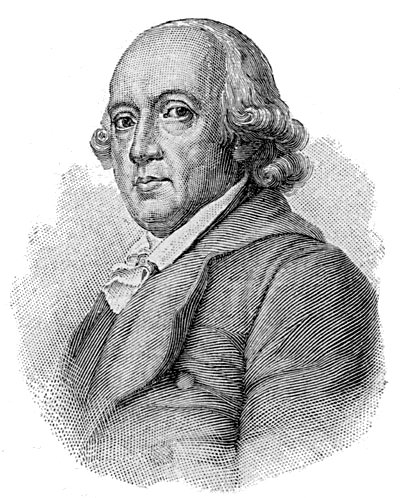
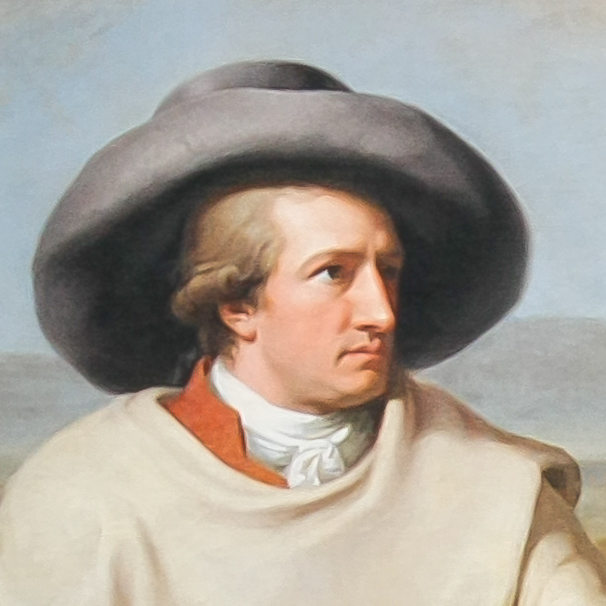
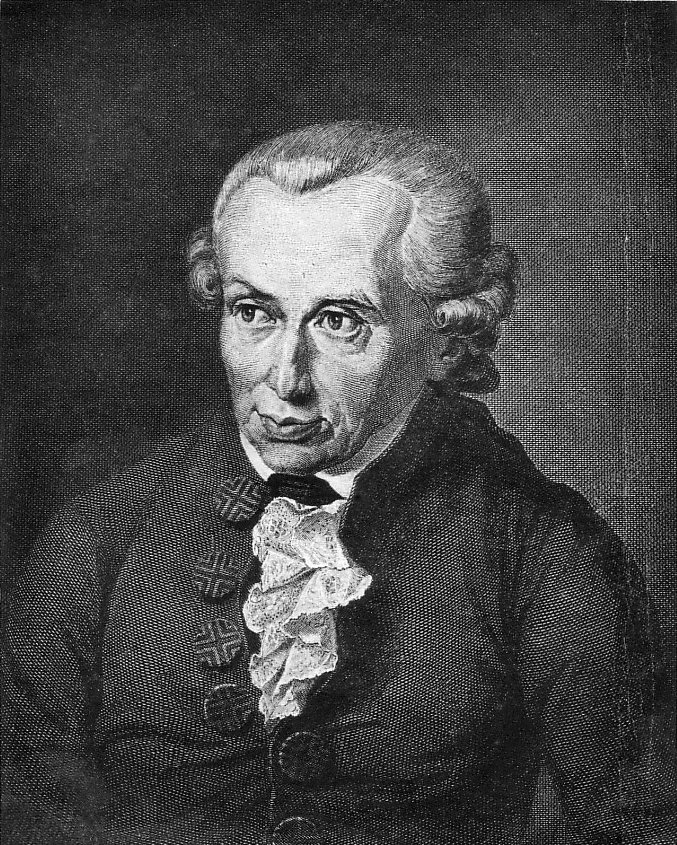
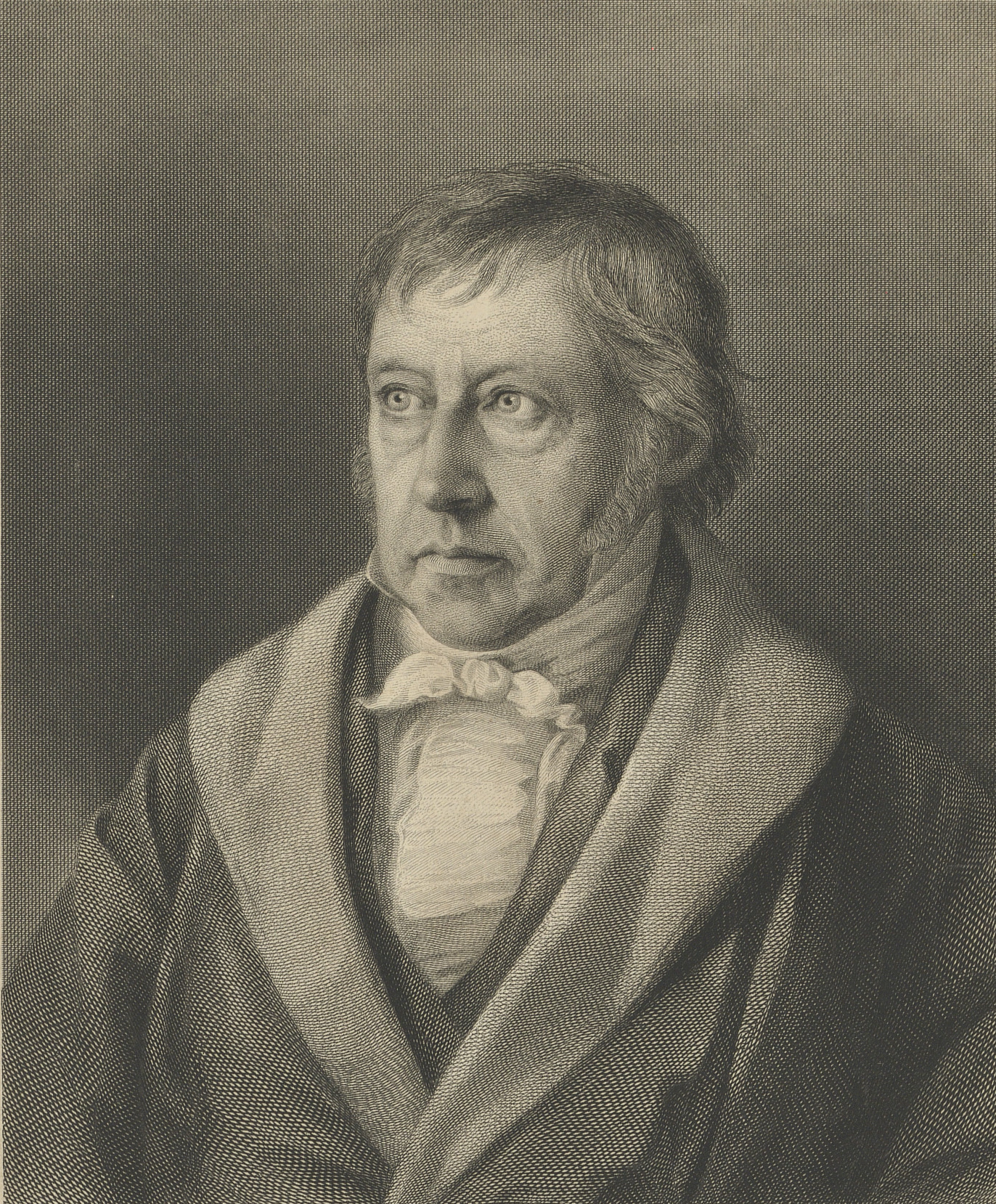
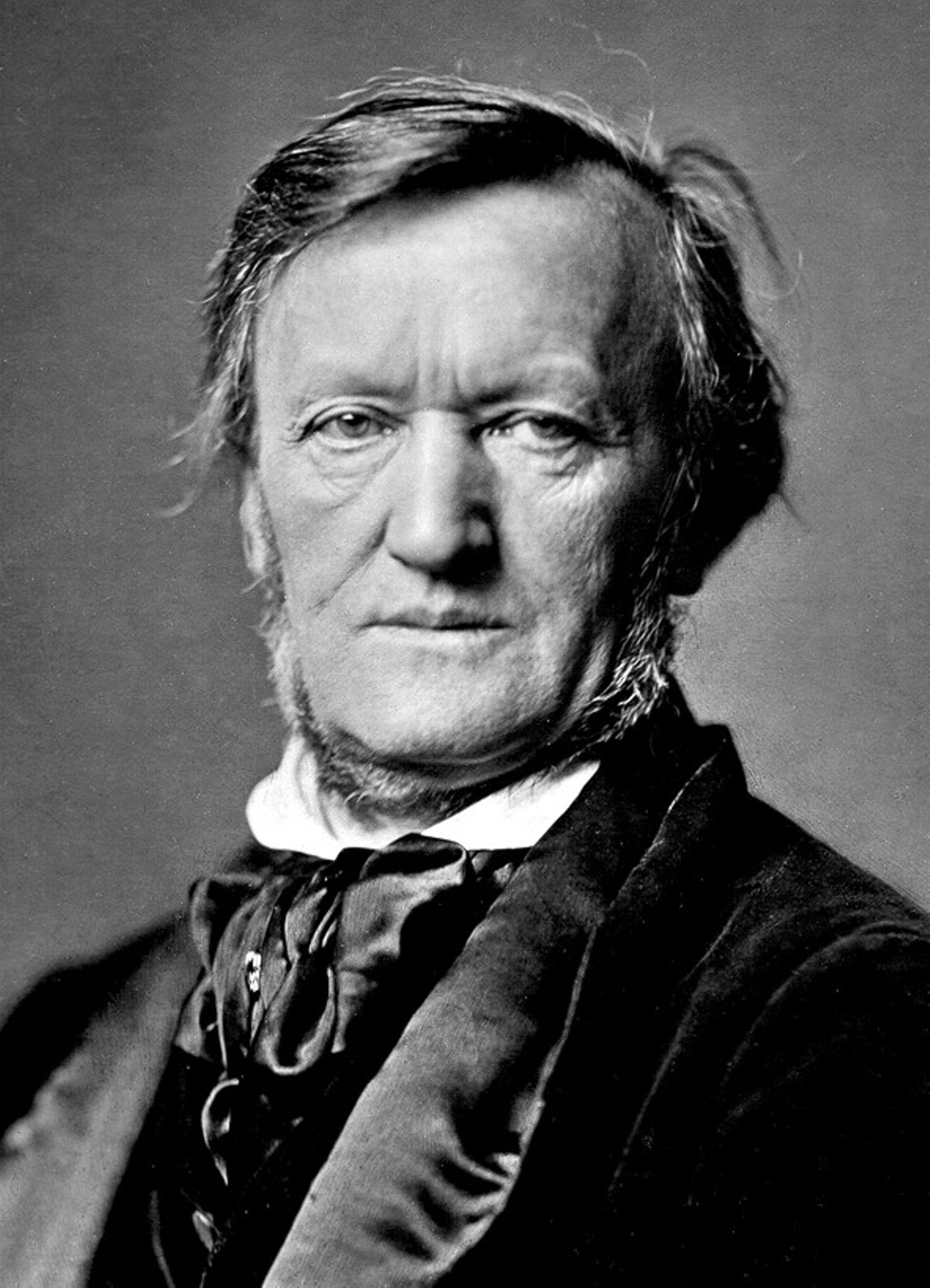
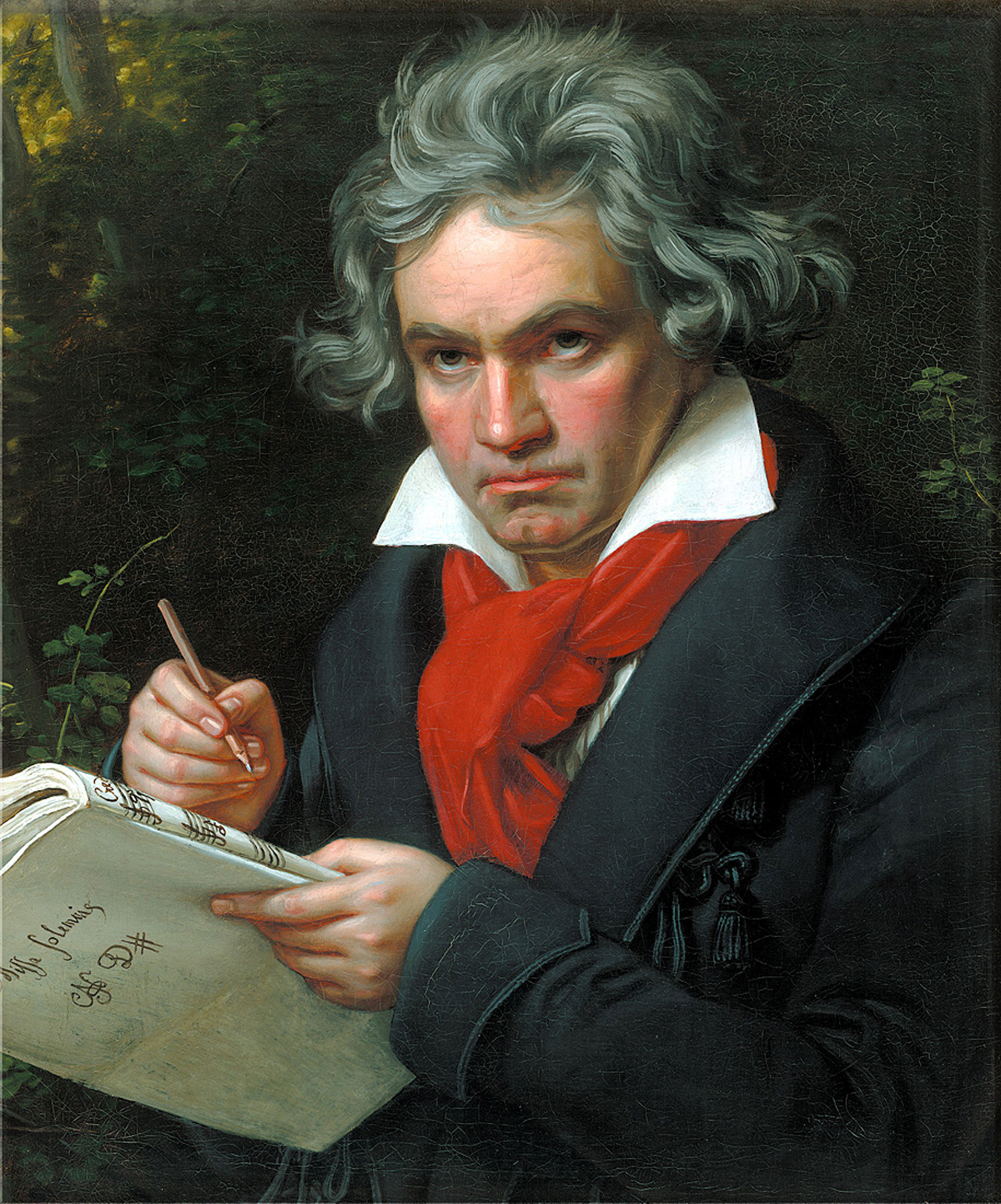
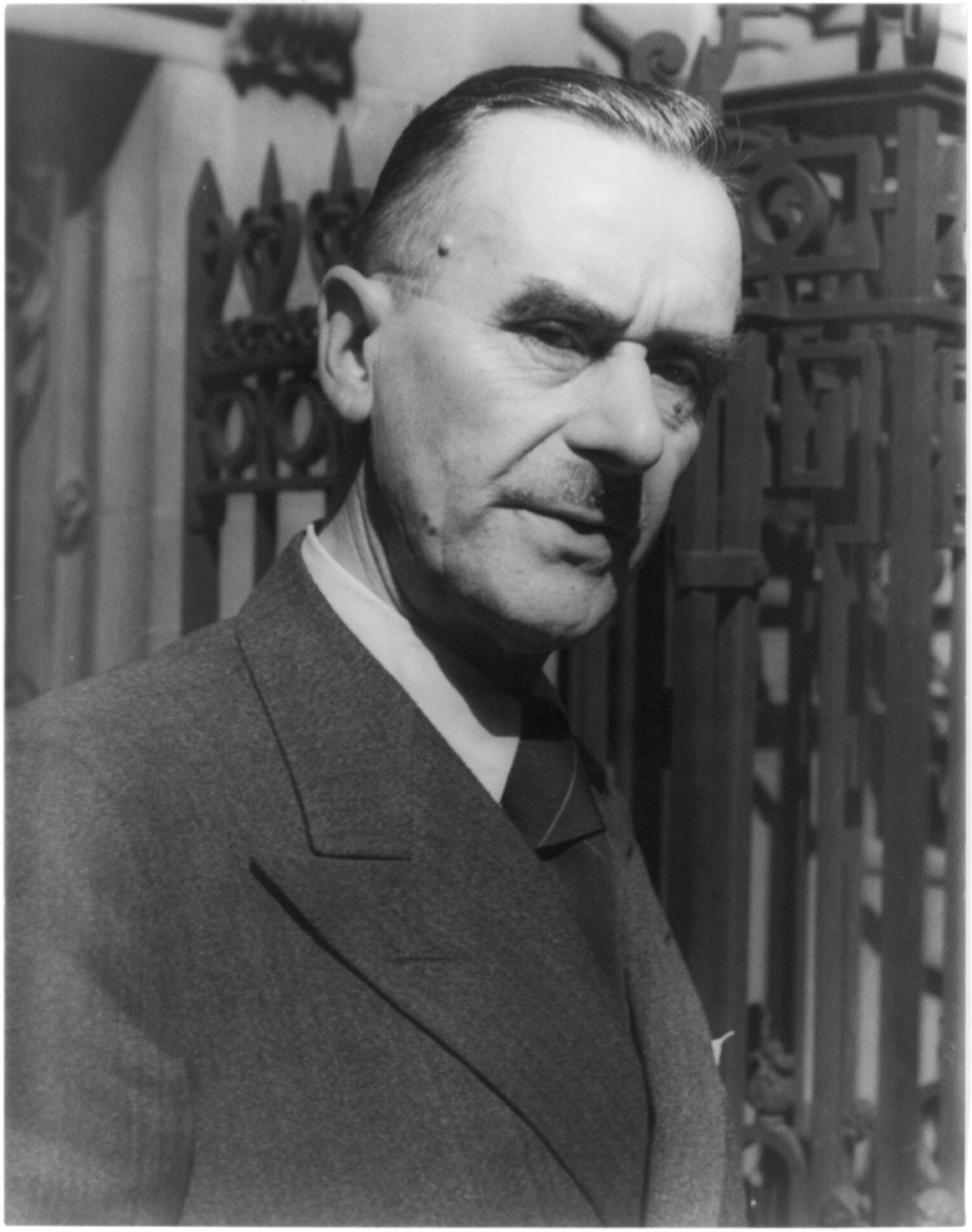
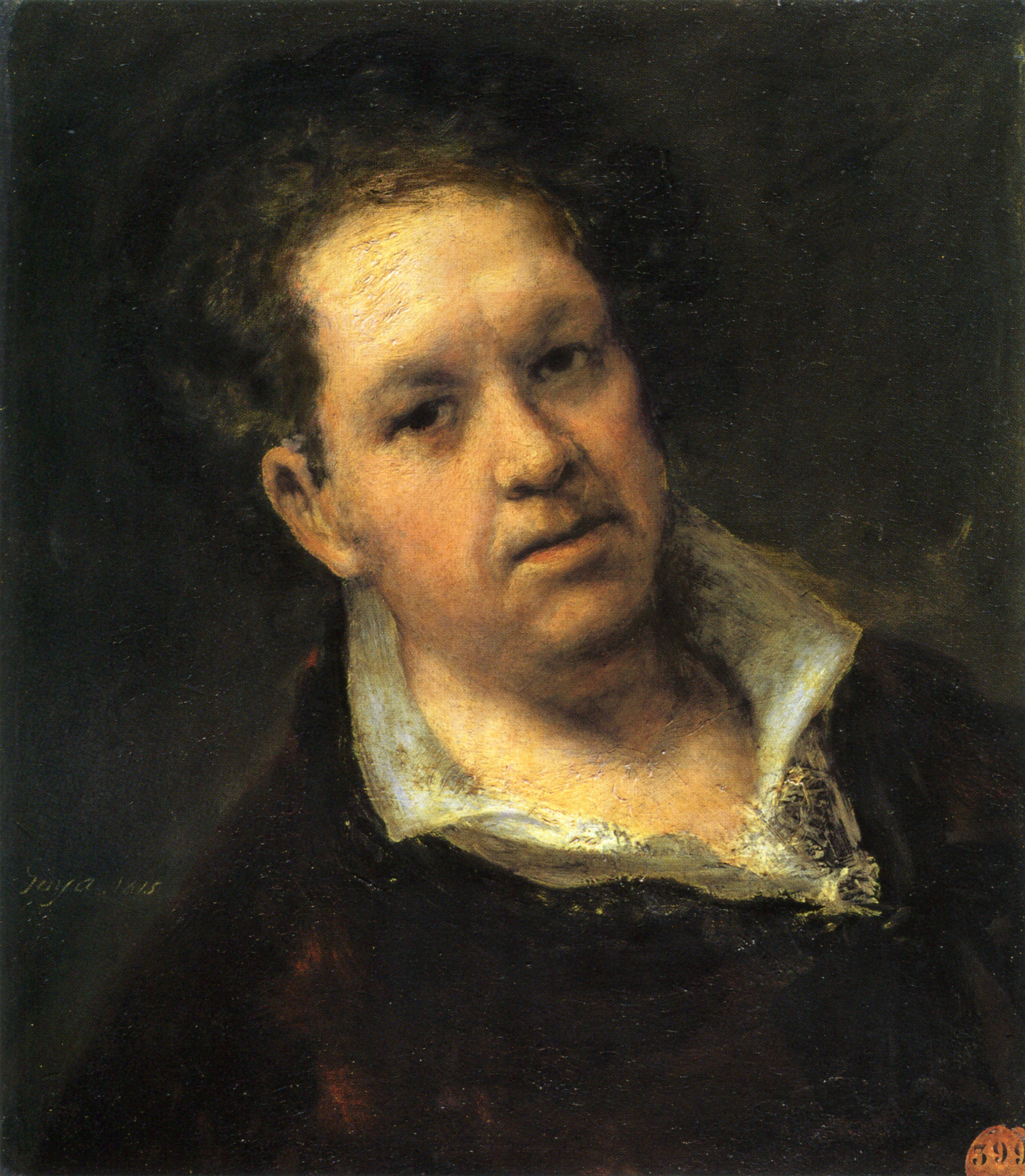
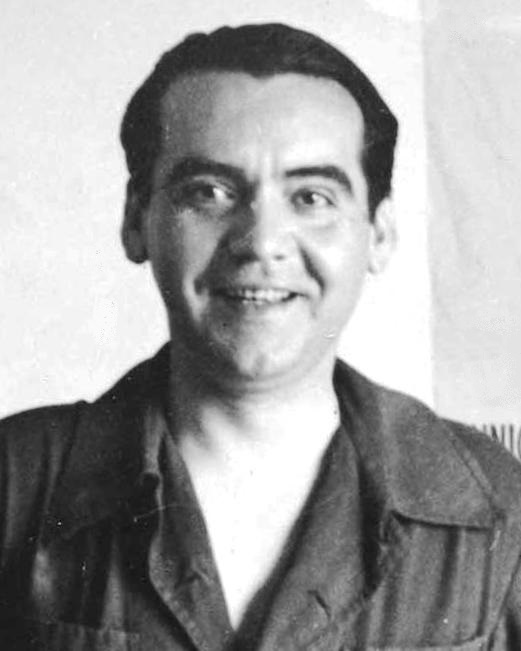
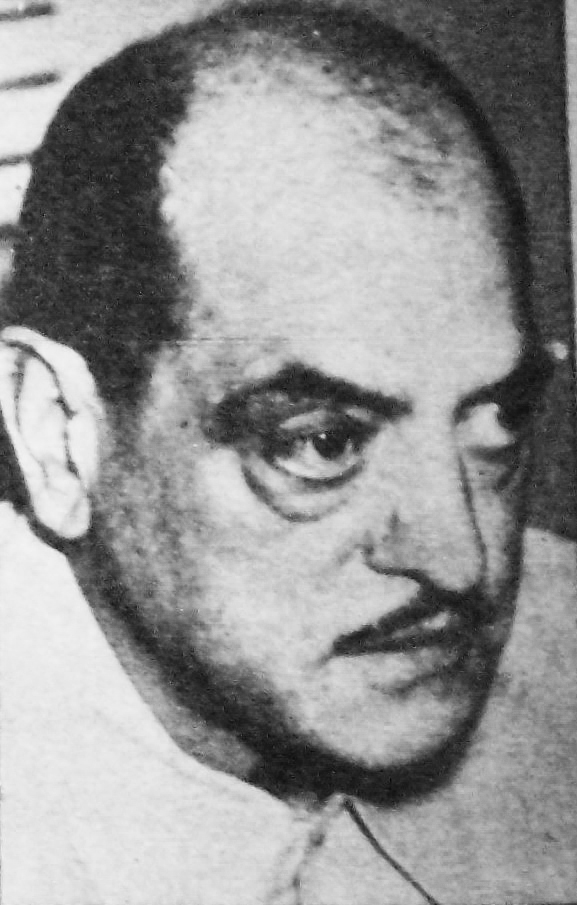
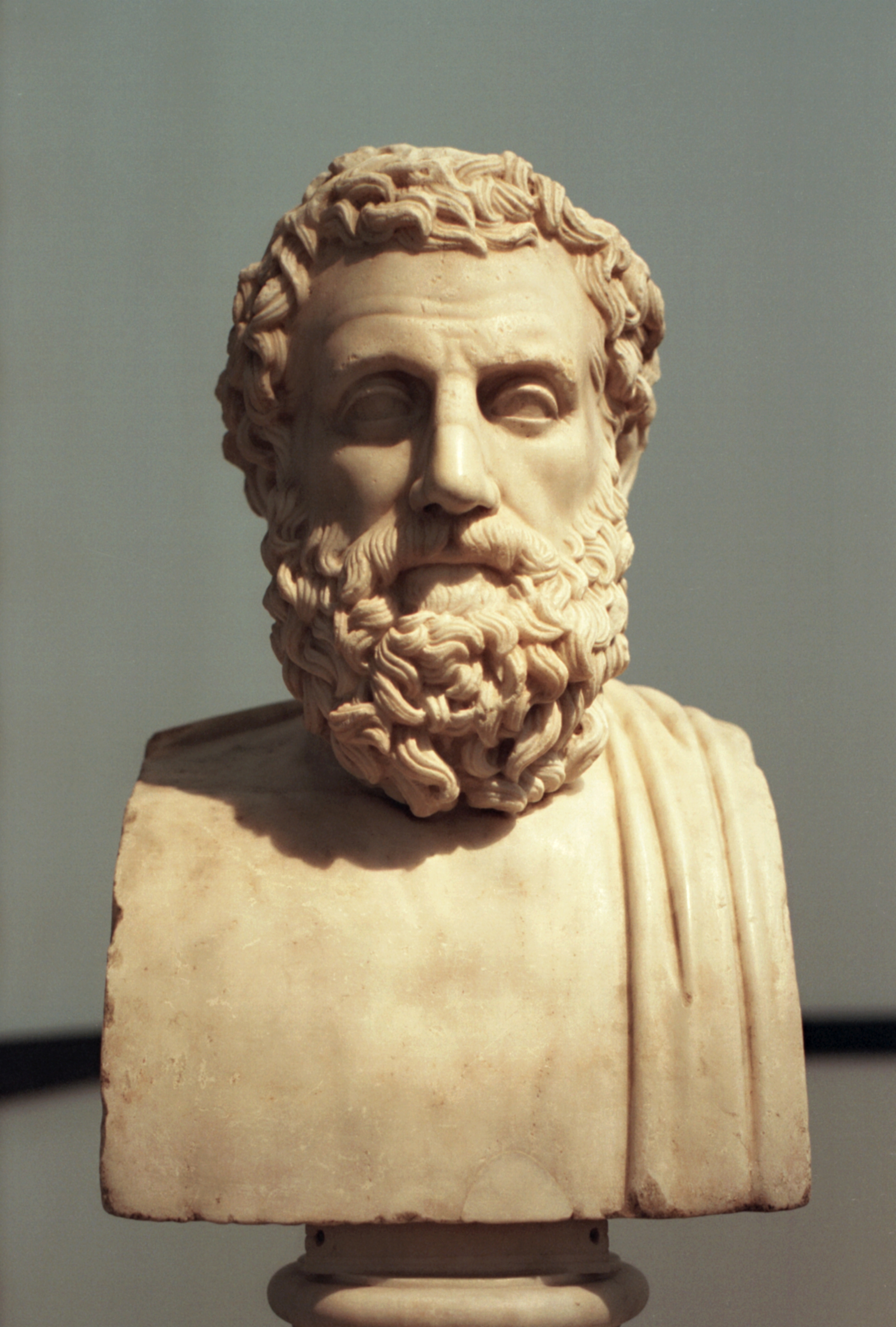
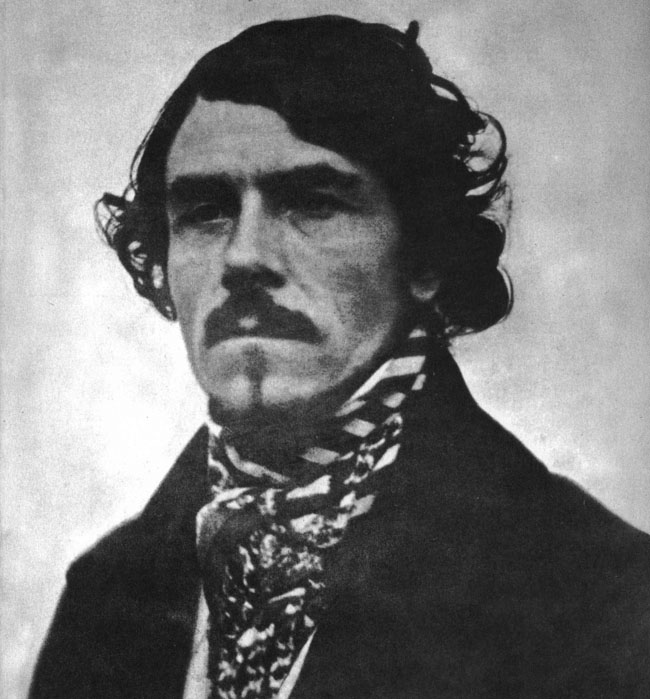
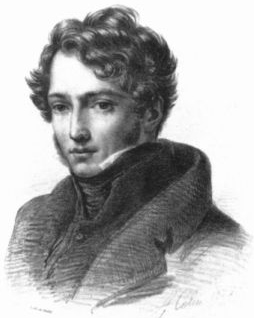
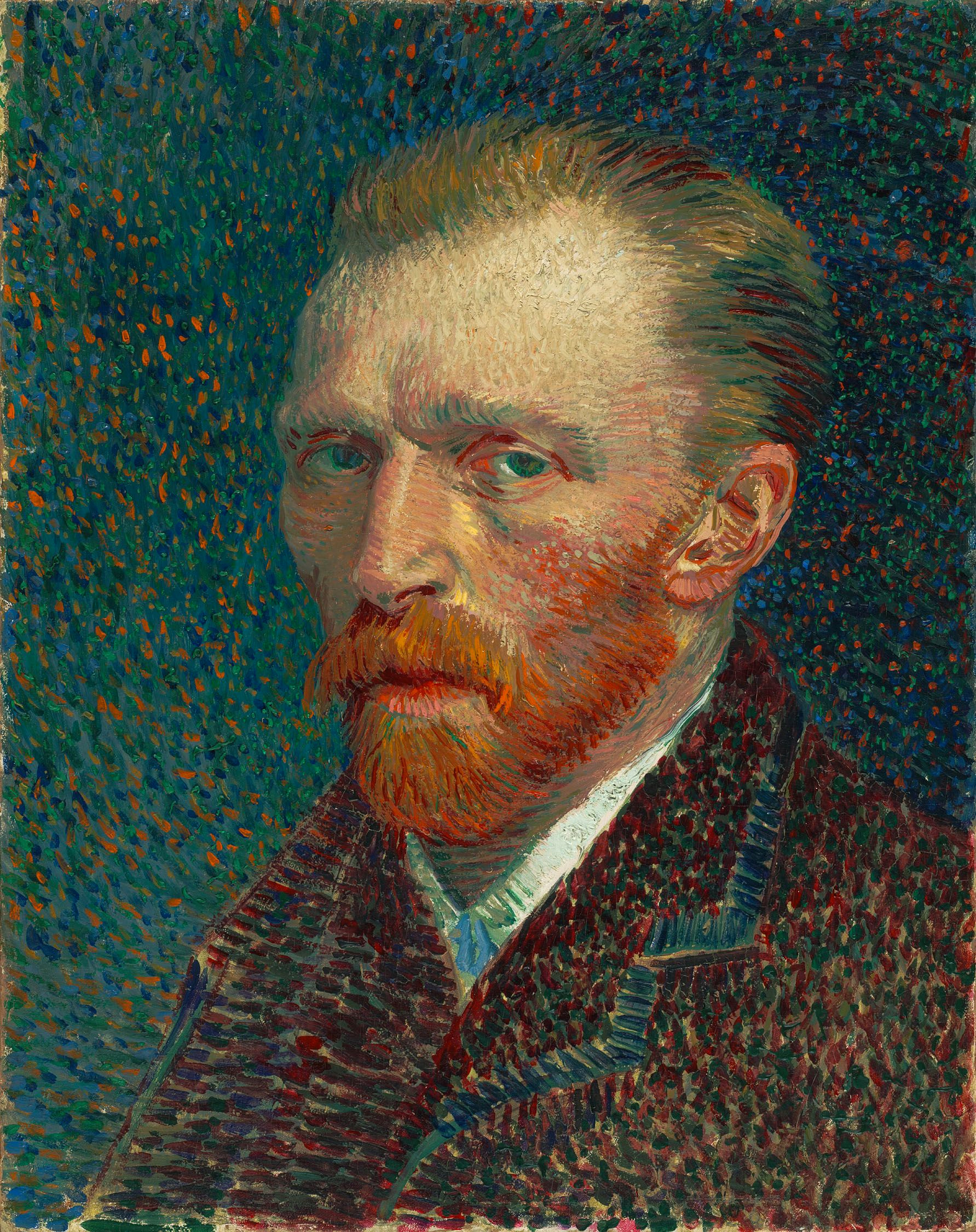
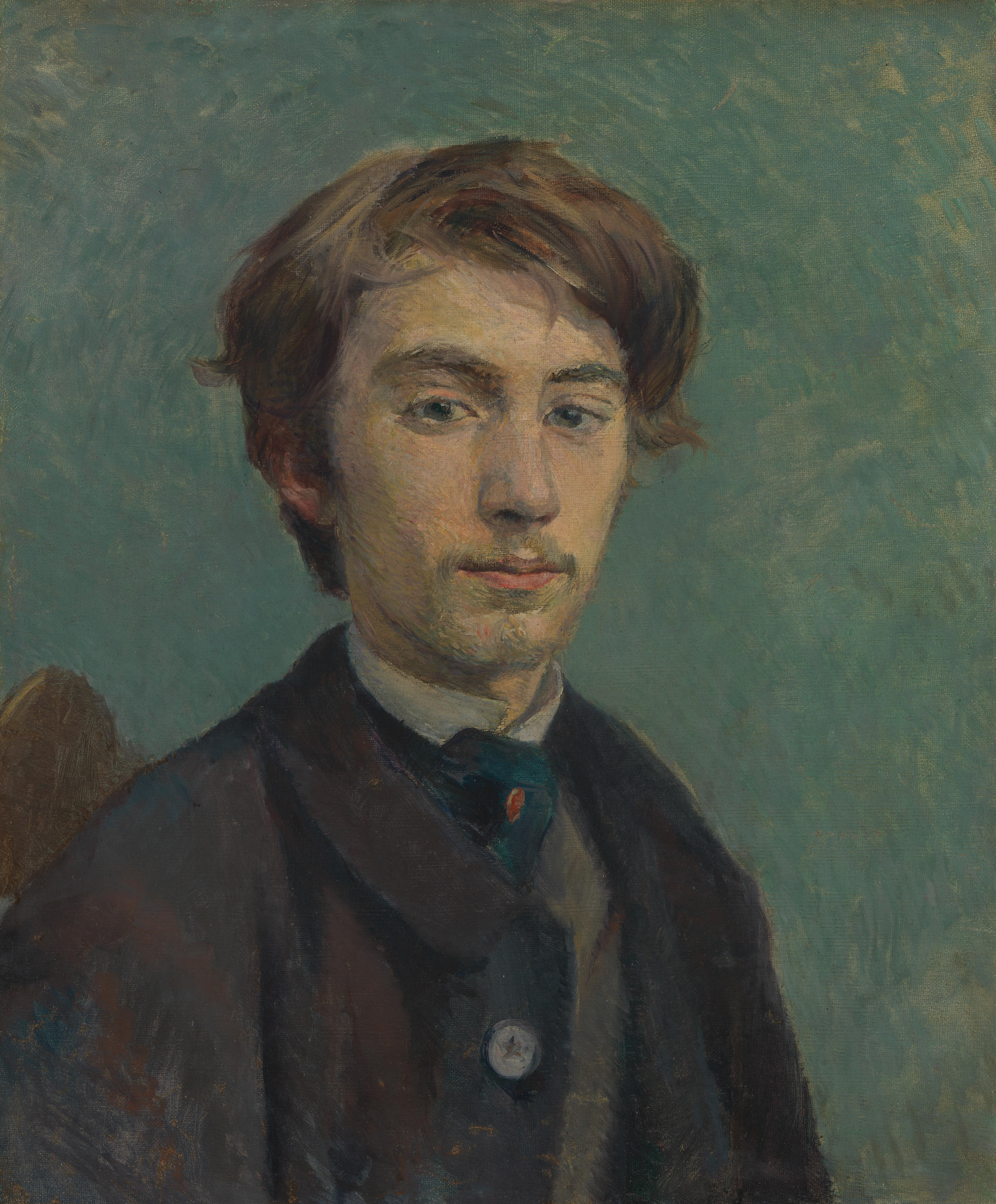
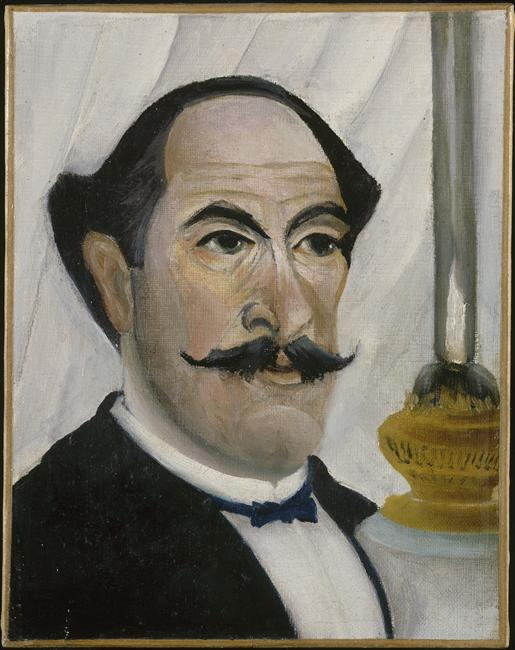
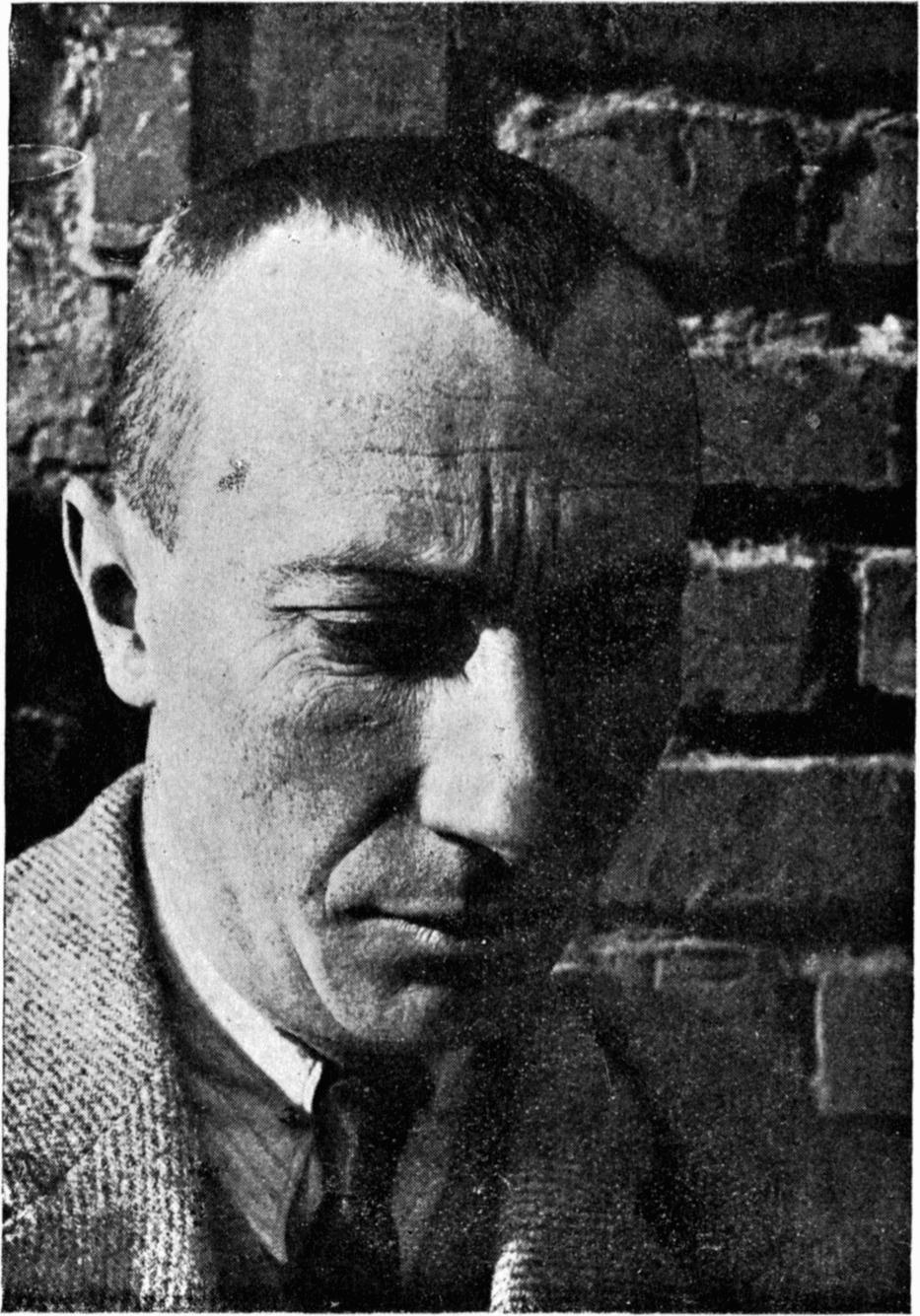
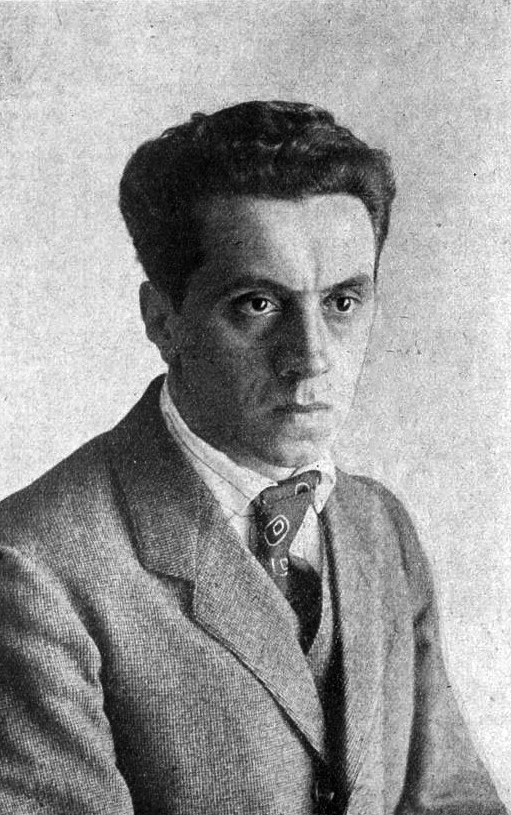
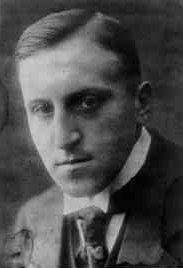
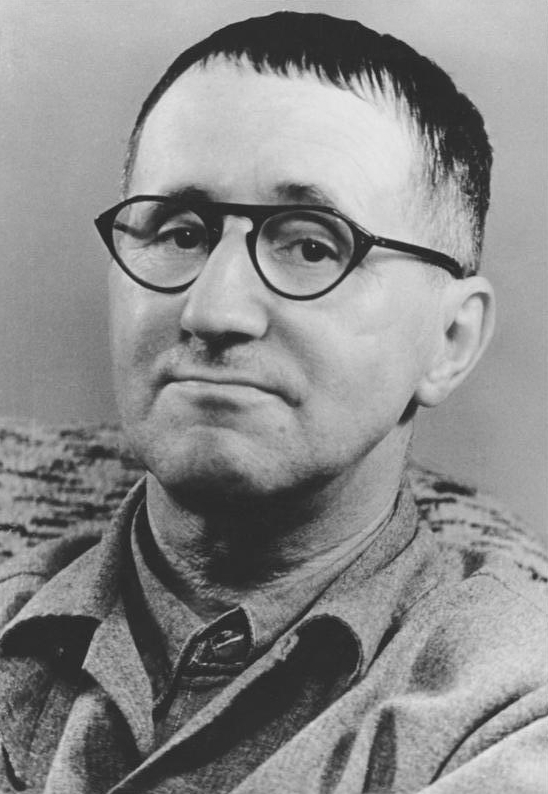
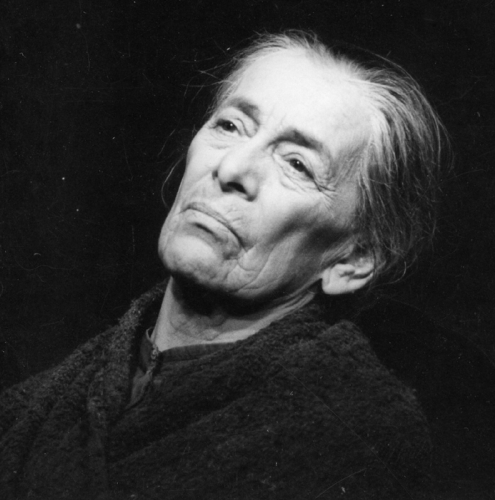
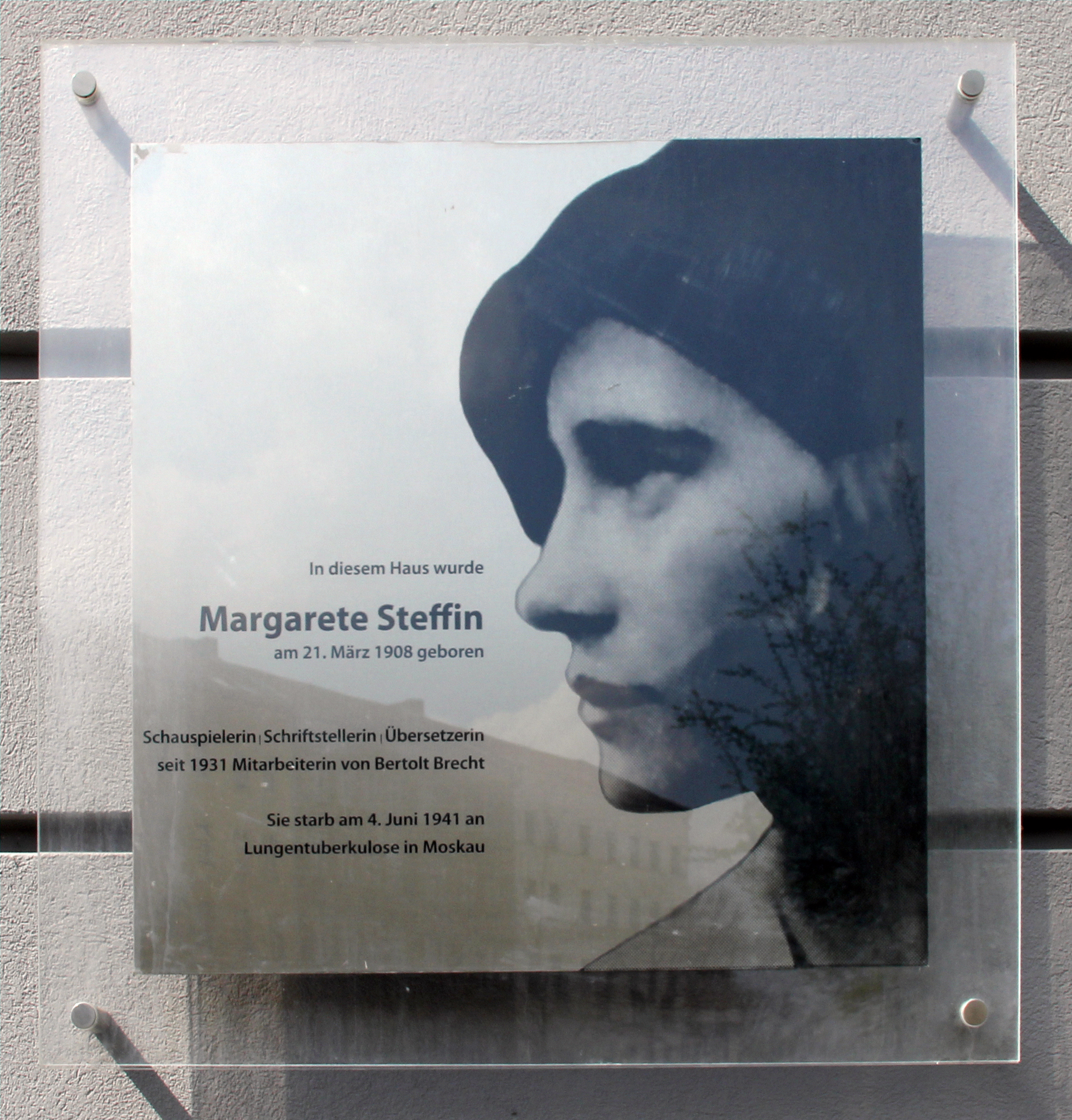
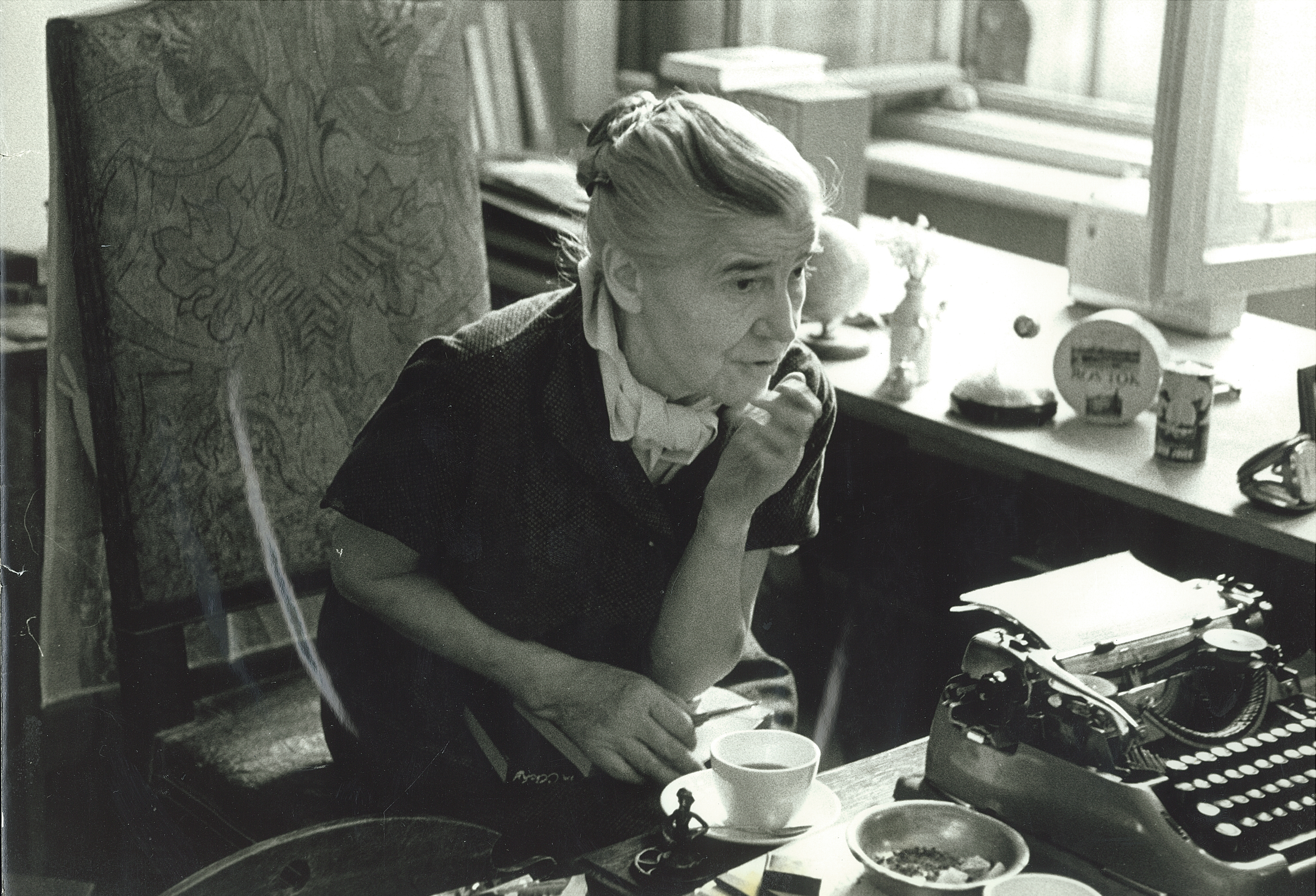
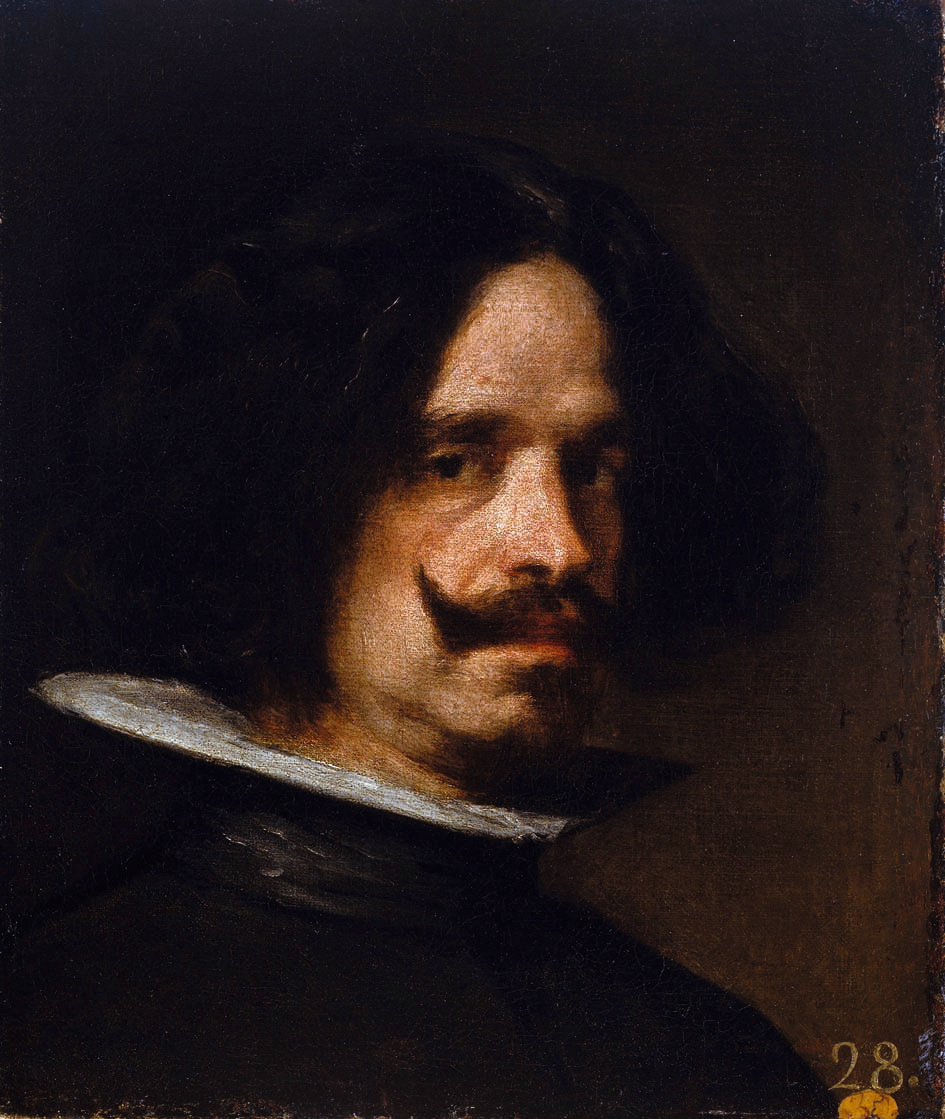
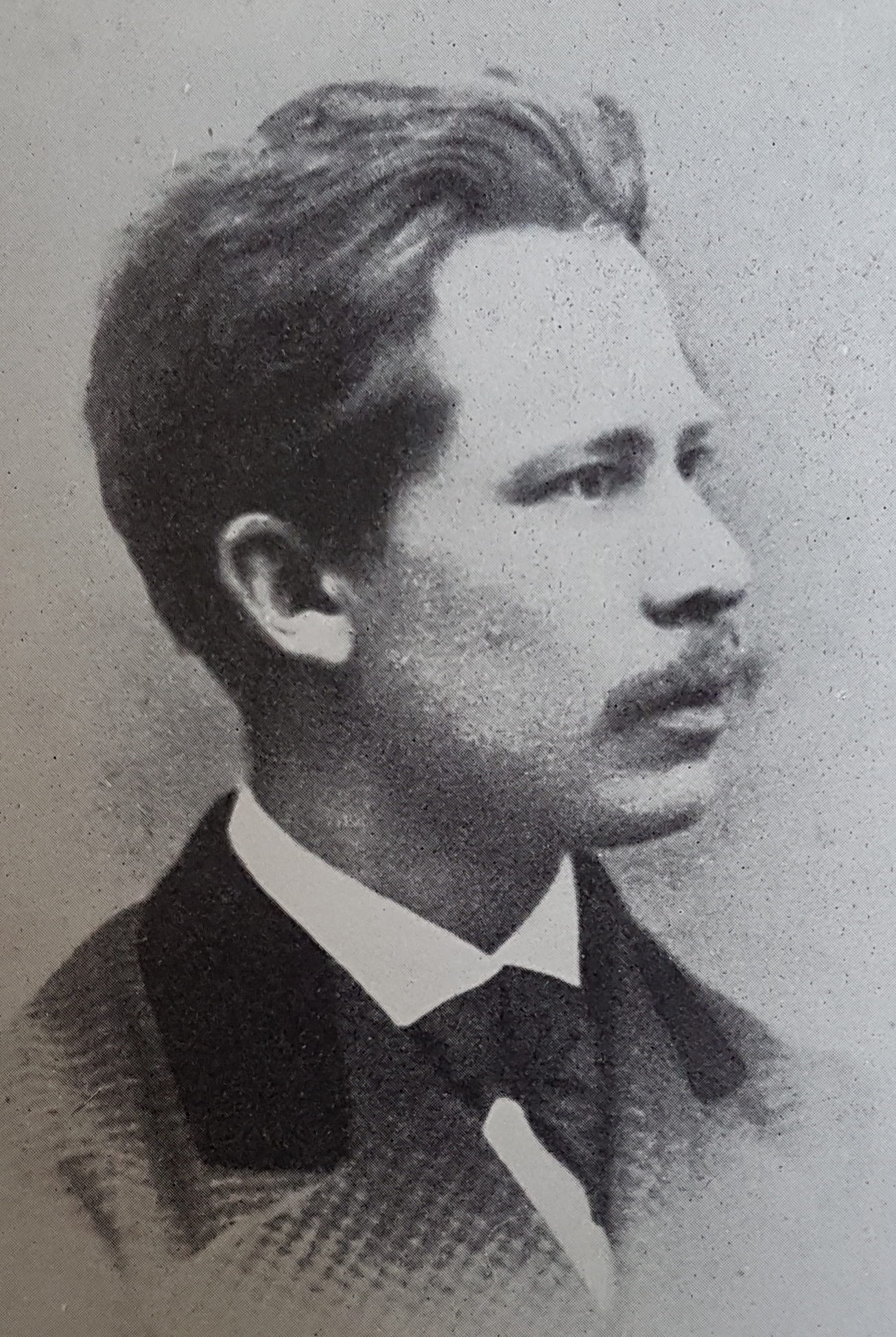
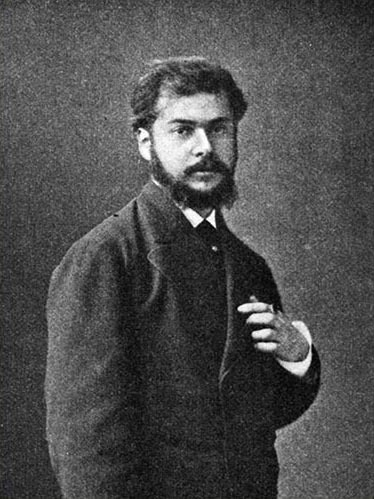
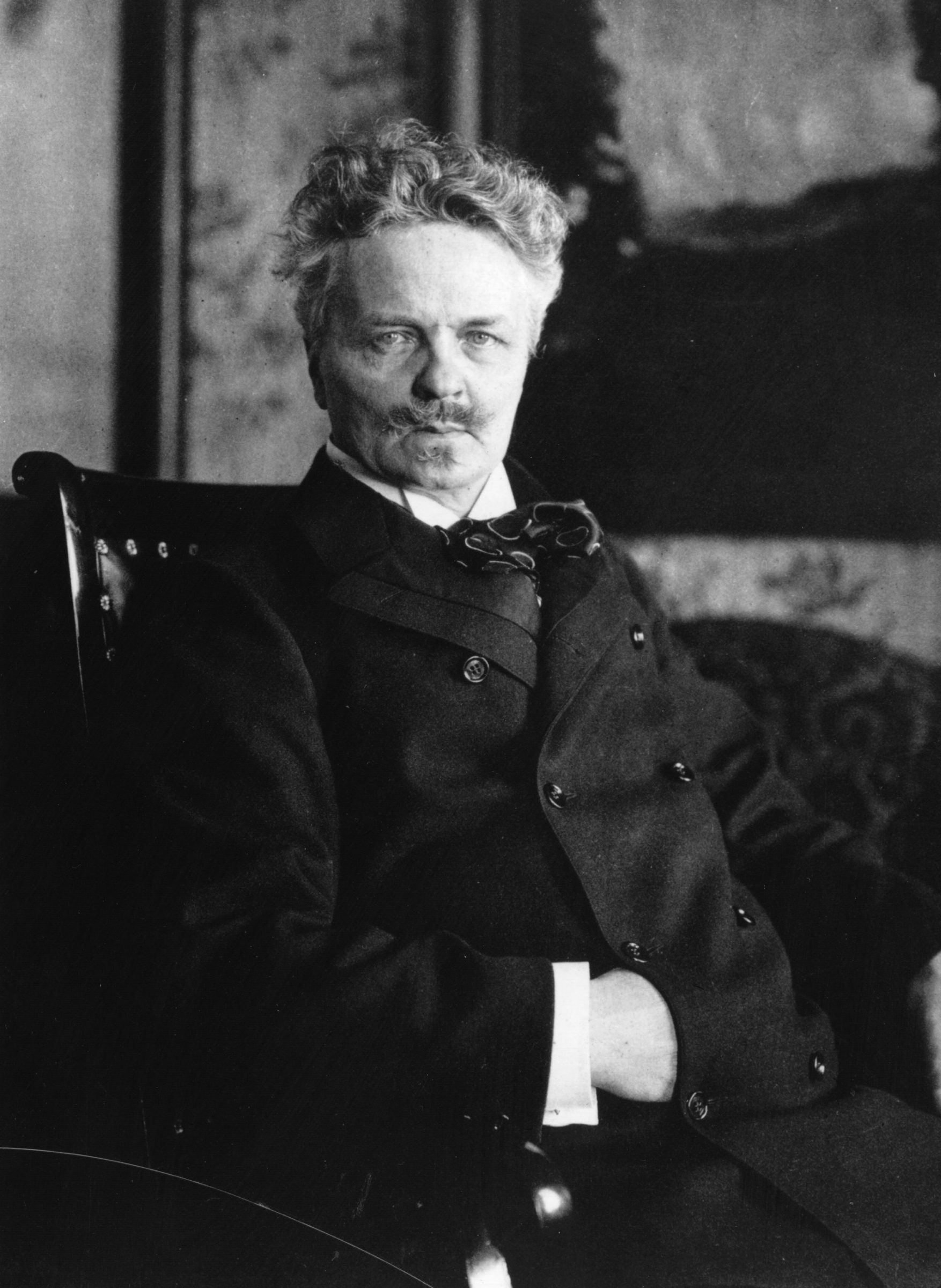
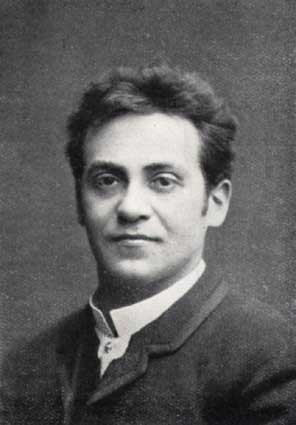
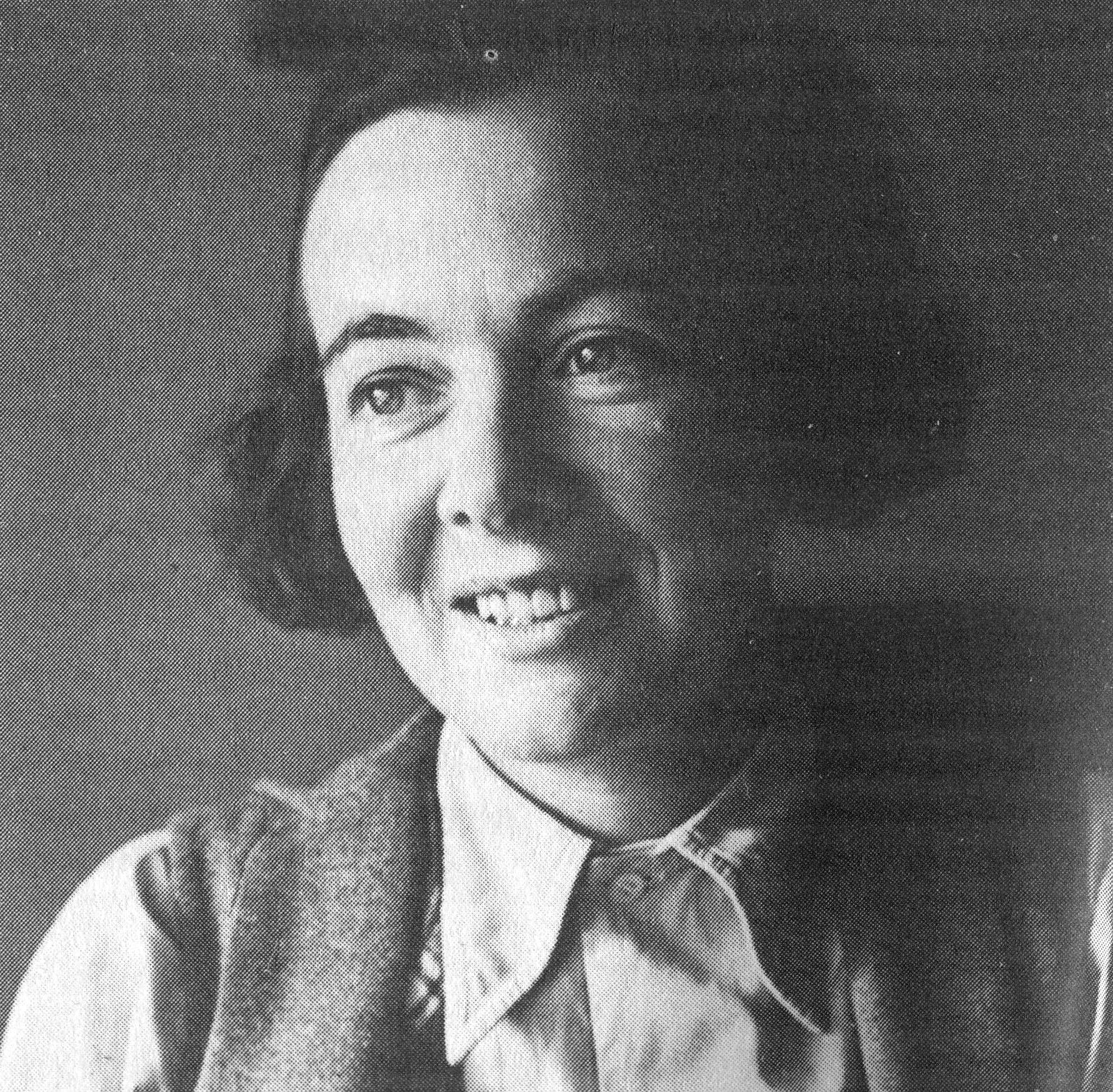
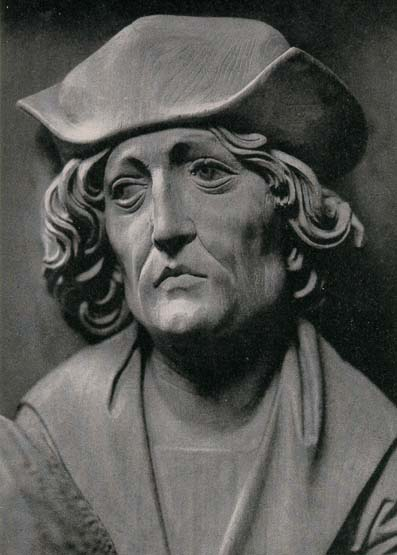
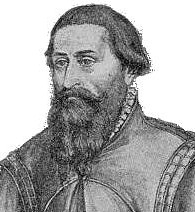
Illustration / Chronology	Artist / Origin	Work / Classification	Entry in the novel
	Max Ernst 1891–1976; Painter	Visual arts / Person: AedW I, p. 57	In the line-up of some modernist artists, especially Surrealism and Dadaism, whose paintings attacked social and political conditions and in which "flashes of fermentation and rot, panic and upheaval" could be seen.
	Paul Klee 1879–1940; Painter	Visual arts / Person: AedW I, p. 57, 79; AedW III, p. 84	in the line-up of some modernist artists, especially Surrealism and Dadaism, whose paintings attacked social and political conditions and in which flashes of fermentation and rot, panic and upheaval could be seen. Paul Klee is revisited several times in the novel as an example of the relationship between art and politics: We insisted that Joyce and Kafka, Schoenberg and Stravinsky, Klee and Picasso belonged to the same row that Dante was in. Culture and politics grew together until 1933: It was the whole atmosphere of vitality, of unlimited imagination, of delight in experimentation, that constituted cultural life
	Wassily Kandinsky 1866-1944; Painter	Visual arts / Person: AedW I, p. 57; AedW II, p. 57	enumerated by way of example: enumerated in the series of some modernist painters, especially Surrealism and Dadaism, whose paintings attacked social and political conditions and in which there was a flashing illumination of fermentation and rot, panic and upheaval. Another mention in the novel is of Kandinsky as one of the painters about whose artistic revolution Leon Trotsky had commented on.
	Kurt Schwitters 1887–1948; Painter	Fine Arts / Person: AedW I, p. 57	listed by way of example: in the line-up of some modernist painters, especially Surrealism and Dadaism, whose paintings attacked social and political conditions and in which flashes of fermentation and rot, panic and upheaval could be seen.
	Salvador Dalí 1904-1989; Painter	Fine Arts / Person: AedW I, S. 57	listed by way of example: in the line-up of some modernist painters, especially Surrealism and Dadaism, whose paintings attacked social and political conditions and in which flashes of fermentation and rot, panic and upheaval could be seen.
	René Magritte 1898–1967; Painter	Fine Arts / Person: AedW I, S. 57	listed by way of example: in the line-up of some modernist painters, especially Surrealism and Dadaism, whose paintings attacked social and political conditions and in which flashes of fermentation and rot, panic and upheaval could be seen.
	Otto Dix 1891–1969; Painter	Fine Arts / Person: AedW I, S. 57; AedW III, S. 84	listed by way of example: in the line-up of some painters of modernism, here especially of New Objectivity, whose pictures attacked the social and political conditions and reflected the decay objectively and accurately. Culture and politics grew together until 1933: It was the whole atmosphere of vitality, of unlimited imagination, of the desire to experiment, that constituted cultural life.
	George Grosz 1893-1959; Painter	Fine Arts / Person: AedW I, S. 57; AedW III, S. 84	On the line-up of some painters of modernism, here especially of New Objectivity, whose pictures attacked the social and political conditions and reflected the decay in a matter-of-fact and accurate way. Towards the end of the novel, the idea is rounded off with his example, among others. Culture and politics grew together until 1933: It was the whole atmosphere of vitality, of unlimited imagination, of delight in experimentation, that made up cultural life.
	Lyonel Feininger 1871–1956 Painter	Fine Arts / Person: AedW I, S. 57, 336	In the ranking of some modernist painters whose pictures attacked social and political conditions and whose pictures sharply dissected and measured existing reality The idea is taken up again in the discussion of Picasso's Guernica.
	Emil Nolde 1867–1956 Painter	Fine Arts / Person: AedW I, S. 57; AedW III, S. 84	In the line-up of some modernist painters whose pictures attacked social and political conditions and heated up reality. Towards the end of the novel, the idea is rounded off with his example, among others. Culture and politics grew together until 1933: It was the whole atmosphere of vitality, of unlimited imagination, of delight in experimentation, that made up cultural life.
	Oskar Kokoschka 1886-1980 Painter	Fine Arts / Person: AedW I, p. 57	in the line-up of some modernist painters whose pictures attacked social and political conditions and "het up reality".
	Max Beckmann 1884-1950 Painter	Fine Arts / Person: AedW I, p. 57; AedW III, p. 84	In the line-up of some modernist painters whose pictures attacked social and political conditions and "het up reality". Towards the end of the novel, the idea is rounded off with his example, among others. Culture and politics grew together until 1933: "It was the whole atmosphere of vitality, of unlimited imagination, of delight in experimentation, that constituted cultural life." But the departure from this idealism is also questioned. Beckmann belonged to the left-wing verist wing of the New Objectivity, his works were ostracised by the Nazis as "degenerate", and he himself managed to emigrate in 1937. At a lecture in 1938, he adhered to a strict separation between spirit and politics and stated that he had never been politically active.
	Jean-François Millet 1814-1895 Painter	Fine Arts / Person: AedW I, p. 62f.	With the discussion of some of Millet's paintings, his personal background is also included and it is asked whether a certain resistant potential can be read from his paintings due to his origins as a farmer's son.
	Vladimir Mayakovsky 1893-1930 Writer	Literature / Person Mayakovsky was a leading exponent of Russian Futurism and was considered a Soviet model poet in the early 1920's. Towards the end of the 1920s, he criticised developments in Soviet society. On 14 April 1930, he shot himself in the heart with a pistol.: AedW I, pp. 66f., 69, 249	The protagonists take Mayakovsky in particular as an example of the upheaval in the Soviet Union's conception of culture and the suppression of expressionist statements by Stalinism: "With his suicide, Mayakovsky (...) had anticipated the disaster that was now befalling the Soviet state".
	Kazimir Malevich 1879-1935 Painter	Fine Arts / Person: AedW I, p. 66f.	In a ranking of artists whose expressionist statements were suppressed in the early Soviet Union and especially by Stalinism: "Why was an art that was revolutionary denied and ostracised, (...) why was a narrow limitation of receptivity introduced when a Mayakovsky, Blok, Bedny, Yesenin and Bely, a Malevich, Lissitzky, Tatlin, Vakhtangov, Teirov, Eisenstein or Vertov had found the language identical with a new universal consciousness".
	James Joyce 1882-1941 Writer	Literature / Person: AedW I, p. 79	In a ranking of artists whose art could change social being: "We insisted that Joyce and Kafka, Schönberg and Stravinsky, Klee and Picasso were in the same rank as Dante."
	Franz Kafka 1883-1924 Writer	Literature / Person: AedW I, p. 79, 178 ff.	Enumerated in a ranking of artists whose art could change social being: "We insisted that Joyce and Kafka, Schönberg and Stravinsky, Klee and Picasso were in the same rank as Dante." Kafka's unfinished novel The Castle is one of the works discussed at length in the novel.
	Arnold Schönberg 1874-1951 Composer	Music / Person: AedW I, p. 79	Enumerated in a ranking of artists whose art could change social being: "We insisted that Joyce and Kafka, Schoenberg and Stravinsky, Klee and Picasso were in the same rank as Dante."
	Igor Stravinsky 1882-1971 Composer	Music / Person: AedW I, p. 79	Enumerated in a ranking of artists whose art could change social being: "We insisted that Joyce and Kafka, Schoenberg and Stravinsky, Klee and Picasso were in the same rank as Dante."
	Pablo Picasso 1881-1973 Painter	Fine Arts / Person: AedW I, pp. 79, 332-337, 339 f., 343, 348; AedW II, pp. 38, 57, 299	Enumerated in a ranking of artists whose art could change social being: "We insisted that Joyce and Kafka, Schoenberg and Stravinsky, Klee and Picasso were in the same rank as Dante." Picasso's painting Guernica is one of the works discussed at length in the novel.
	Dante Alighieri 1265-1321 Poet and philosopher	Literature / Person: AedW I, p. 79	Enumerated in a ranking of artists whose art could change social being: "We insisted that Joyce and Kafka, Schoenberg and Stravinsky, Klee and Picasso belonged to the same rank in which Dante found himself." Dante's story The Divine Comedy is one of the works discussed at length in the novel.
	Carola Neher 1900-1942 Actress	Performing Arts / Person: AedW I, p. 153 f.	In the context of the protagonists' discussion of Stalin's purges in the Soviet Union, Neher's arrest in July 1936, and indictment in the Moscow Trials.
	Sergei Eisenstein 1898-1948 Director	Performing Arts / Person: AedW I, p. 157	Example of a list of cultural contributions about Soviet film in the Arbeiter Illustrierte (AIZ): "It introduced many of us to the problems of art, literature, science. Here was carried on in the picture what the great (...) films of Eisenstein, Pudovkin, Ekk, Vertov had stimulated."
	Willi Bredel 1901-1964 Writer	Performing Arts / Person: AedW I, S. 257; AedW II, S. 68	Example in a list of contemporary workers' writers: "In the books of Kläber, Gotsche, Hoelz, Bredel, Marchwitza or Neukrantz, the proletarian reality confronted us, between dreary, gray weariness and open struggle." In scenes of the Spanish Civil War, Bredel is mentioned even more times.
	Friedrich Hölderlin 1770-1843 Poet	Performing Arts / Person: AedW I, S. 257; AedW II, S. 68	Enumeration and juxtaposition of some personalities in the German cultural history: "Not the insights of Hölderlin, his Hellenism, this disguise of the spirit of the French revolution (...) had become effective in the nature of the Germans, but the Germanizing chauvinism of Fichte. (...) This disproportion between the titans, these pillars of the authorities, who denied the people reason and the right to independence and recommended them surrendered obedience, and revolutionary, ostracized, outcast figures like Forster, Kleist, Grabbe, Büchner, Heine had never allowed the development of humanism in Germany to arise."
	Johann Gottlieb Fichte 1762–1814 Philosopher	Literature / Person: AedW I, p. 257	Enumeration and juxtaposition of some personalities in German cultural history: "Not Hölderlin's insights, his Hellenism, this disguise of the spirit of the French Revolution (...) had become effective in the nature of the Germans, but the Germanizing chauvinism of Fichte."
	Ulrich von Hutten 1488–1523 Humanist	Literature / Person: AedW I, S. 257	Enumeration and juxtaposition of some personalities in German cultural history: "(...) as also the enlightened, rational Hutten was displaced by the popular Luther".
	Martin Luther 1483–1546 Theologian	Literature / Person: AedW I, S. 257	Enumeration and juxtaposition of some personalities in German cultural history: "(...) as also the enlightened, rational Hutten was displaced by the popular Luther".
	Johann Gottfried Herder 1744-1803 Poet	Literature / Person: AedW I, S. 257	Enumeration and juxtaposition of some personalities in German cultural history: "(...) the soberly scientific Herder was displaced by the emotionally idealistic Goethe".
	Johann Wolfgang von Goethe 1749–1832 Poet	Literature / Person: AedW I, S. 257	Enumeration and juxtaposition of some personalities in German cultural history: "(...) the soberly scientific Herder was displaced by the emotionally idealistic Goethe".
	Immanuel Kant 1724–1804 Philosopher	Literature / Person: AedW I, S. 257	Enumeration and juxtaposition of some personalities in German cultural history: "(...) the dry Kant, limiting himself to the human realm of experience, was pushed to the wall by the metaphysical Hegel."
	Georg Wilhelm Friedrich Hegel 1770–1831 Philosopher	Literature / Person: AedW I, S. 257	Enumeration and juxtaposition of some personalities in German cultural history: "(...) the dry Kant, limiting himself to the human realm of experience, was pushed to the wall by the metaphysical Hegel."
	Richard Wagner 1813-1883 Composer	Music / Person: AedW I, p. 257	Enumeration and juxtaposition of some personalities in German cultural history: "Therein (...) were to be found the reasons for the fascist mass psychosis, which wrapped itself in the sounds of Wagner and abused Beethoven".
	Ludwig van Beethoven 1770-1831 Composer	Music / Person: AedW I, S. 257	Enumeration and comparison of some personalities in German cultural history: "Therein (...) were to be found the reasons for the fascist mass psychosis, which wrapped itself in the sounds of Wagner and abused Beethoven".
	Thomas Mann 1875-1955 Writer	Literature / Person: AedW I, S. 263f.	Mention of his career from liberal author to opponent of the fascist dictatorship and discussion of his relationship between art and politics.
	Francisco de Goya 1746–1828 Painter	Fine Arts / Person: AedW I, p. 271	Francisco de Goya, and his work in particular, is discussed several times in the course of the novel. First, he is mentioned in the first-person narrator's ideas of the country and republic of Spain through memories of "Goya's Caprichos and Desastres, of poems by Lorca, of images from a surrealist film by Luis Buñuel".
	Federico García Lorca 1898-1936 Writer	Literature / Person: AedW I, S. 271; AedW II, S. 153	The first-person narrator's ideas of the country and republic of Spain are shaped by memories of "Goya's Caprichos and Desastres, of poems by Lorca, of images from a surrealist film by Buñuel."
	Luis Buñuel 1900-1983 Director	Performing Arts / Person: AedW I, p. 271	The first-person narrator's ideas of the country and republic of Spain are shaped by memories of "Goya's Caprichos and Desastres, of poems by Lorca, of images from a surrealist film by Buñuel."
	Aeschylus 525 - 456 BC Poet	Literature / Person Aeschylus is the oldest of the three great Greek tragedians. He took part as a soldier for Athens in the battle of Marathon against the Persians in 490 BC.: AedW I, p. 287	He is mentioned as the role model of a protagonist in the Spanish Civil War: "In politics, in the art of the possible, there is no place for feelings, and even in the art of the impossible, which encompasses our emotions, our sense of form, our poetic sense, everything must now be under the sign of the necessary. (...) Our model is Aeschylus, who went into the field heavily armed."
	Eugène Delacroix 1798-1863 Painter	Fine Arts / Person: AedW I, p. 347	Reflections on the personal background with which Delacroix painted the confrontation in Paris in 1830: "Hitherto he had transposed his dissolute fantasies into infernal journeys and slaughter (...) now he was trying to give shape to this July day in the throes of which he had been caught. Driven by idealism and also by arrogance, which was part of the feeling of uselessness that sometimes overshadowed his life, he wanted to participate in the unstoppable force that urged change".
	Théodore Géricault 1791–1824 Painter	Fine Arts / Person: AedW I, S. 347	An examination of the painter's personal background: "Similarly, Géricault's vision emerged from a harried, disturbed life in which the unruliness, the constant flight from oneself, found expression at first in the military campaigns and the collapse of the Napoleonic empire, in broadly and violently painted martial scenes, and later in wildly coursing horses".
	Vincent van Gogh 1853–1890 Painter	Fine Arts / Person: AedW I, 66, 185, 343; AedW II, S. 34ff.	An examination of Van Gogh's work is made in several sections of the novel, particularly within the depiction of an imaginary scene in which the protagonists meet the artist in Montmartre: "He wanted nothing more than his right to work, his right to dispose of his own work, he wanted the free community of art workers.
	Émile Bernard 1868–1941 Painter	Fine Arts / Person Bernard was a friend of Van Gogh and is considered to have played a major role in Synthetic Symbolism.: AedW II, p. 35	Mention in an imaginary scene of meeting Van Gogh at the Café du Tambourin in Montmartre.
	Henri Rousseau 1844–1910 Painter	Fine Arts / Peraon: AedW II, S. 38	Description of the legendary banquet at the Bateau-Lavoir in 1908, celebrated on the occasion of the sale of a painting by Rousseau. The depiction in the novel is stylised like a self-portrait of the painter.
	Hans Arp 1886-1966 Painter and lyricist	Visual Arts / Person Hans Arp is considered one of the most important representatives of Dadaism and Surrealism in both visual art and literature. He was a member of the Abstraction-Création group.: AedW II, p. 55, 58	List of artists who stood up for a revolting art: "Living between international newspapers and magazines, between pamphlets, manifestos, emissaries travelling back and forth, the inventions of a Cravan, Picabia, Duchamp, Arp, Apollinaire had entered us, no one could say where we had acquired the openness for such experimentation, the explanation was perhaps only again that our senses had been sharpened by all the humiliations and chastisements.
	Ernst Toller 1893-1939 Writer	Literature / Person Ernst Toller was a participant in the Munich Soviet republic, and in the 1920s created plays in the style of the New Objectivity that received much public attention. In 1933, he emigrated from Germany, and from 1935 he supported the Spanish Republic with publications and fundraising. After the announcement of defeat, he committed suicide.: AedW II, pp. 130, 173f.	Portrayals of Toller's life and arguments about his political impact as well as his suicide after numerous personal setbacks and defeat in the Spanish Civil War. He killed himself because he saw no political way out. "His whole work had been an indictment against the disempowerment of the individual, (...) he had to let himself be crushed, and yet in his defenselessness he was more honest than the others who entrench themselves behind restraint".
	Carl von Ossietzky 1889-1938 Writer and journalist	Literature / Person Carl von Ossietzky was the editor of the journal Die Weltbühne. He was arrested in 1933, interned and severely maltreated. He was awarded the Nobel Peace Prize in 1935, but was forbidden to accept it personally by the Nazi government. He died in 1938 as a result of his imprisonment.: AedW II, p. 131 ff.	Account by Rosalinde von Ossietzky-Palm, the daughter of Carl von Ossietzky, who is included as a protagonist in the novel, of the persecution and death of her father.
	Bertolt Brecht 1898-1956 Writer	Literature / Person: AedW II, S. 142ff., 239ff., 310ff. among others	Depicted in a scene in the garden of the house in Lidingö where the "Brechtian extended family" lived in exile until the end of 1939.
	Helene Weigel 1900-1971 Actor	Performing Arts / Person: AedW II, p. 152	Depicted in a scene in the garden of the house in Lidingö where the "Brechtian extended family" lived in exile until the end of 1939.
	Margarete Steffin 1908-1941 Writer, actor	Literature / Person: AedW II, S. 152	Depicted in a scene in the garden of the house in Lidingö where the "Brechtian extended family" lived in exile until the end of 1939.
	Ruth Berlau 1906-1974 Actress	Performing Arts / Person: AedW II, p. 152	Depicted in a scene in the garden of the house in Lidingö where the "Brechtian extended family" lived in exile until the end of 1939.
	Diego Velázquez 1599-1660 Painter	Fine Arts / Person: AedW II, p. 155	Listed as court painter whose paintings were exhibited in the Royal Palace of El Pardo.
	Carl Fredrik Hill 1849–1911 Painter	Fine Arts / Person: AedW II, p. 281	Listed as an example of a Swedish artist misunderstood by his time, driven to madness: "this city, where your reason shall be choked off by the philistines, where you shall perish among the lukewarm, the indolent."
	Ernst Josephson 1851–1906 Painter	Fine Arts / Person: AedW II, p. 281	Listed as an example of a Swedish artist misunderstood by his time, driven to madness: "this city, where your reason shall be choked off by the philistines, where you shall perish among the lukewarm, the indolent."
	August Strindberg 1849-1912 Writer	Literature / Person: AedW II, S. 281	Listed as an example of a Swedish artist who was misunderstood by his time, driven to madness: "this city, in which your reason is to be strangled by the philistines, in which you are to perish among the lukewarm, the indolent".
	Alexander Girardi 1850-1918 Actor	Performing Arts / Person Girardi enjoyed great success as a vocal comedian at the Theater an der Wien for well over 20 years at the end of the 19th century and around the turn of the century. One of his famous roles was Torelli in the play Künstlerblut by Edmund Eysler.: AedW II, p. 314	Listed during the extensive enumeration of Brecht's library as a statement by Brecht, who could not part with a book about Girardi's life: "His Torelli, in the Singspiel Künstlerblut, (...) must have been Kafka's model, in the characterisation of the painter Titorelli, in the trial."
	Karin Boye 1900-1941 Writer	Literature Boye's poetry reflects all the intellectual currents of modernity. Her main work, the novel Kallocain, is strongly influenced by Jonathan Swift and takes a very gloomy view of the future. On 24 April 1941, Karin Boye committed suicide by poisoning in a forest near Alingsås.: AedW III, pp. 22-36	The writer is the protagonist in the third part of the novel and influences the development of the first-person narrator as a writer in a field of tension contrasted with Brecht. Her last months in Alingsås and her suicide are also depicted.
	Elisabeth Schumacher 1904-1942 Graphic artist	Fine Arts / Person Elisabeth Schumacher was a resistance fighter in the circle of the Red Orchestra (Rote Kapelle). She was executed on 22 December 1942 in Plötzensee prison.: AedW III, p. 87 et al.	Elisabeth Schumacher is named several times in the novel for her history in the resistance, but her artistic work is not listed.
	Oda Schottmüller 1905-1943 Dancer and sculptor	Performing Arts / Person Oda Schottmüller was an active member of the Red Orchestra (Rote Kapelle) and was executed on 5 August 1943 together with Liane Berkowitz, Cato Bontjes van Beek, Eva-Maria Buch, Hilde Coppi, Ursula Goetze, Emil Hübner, Adam Kuckhoff, Ingeborg Kummerow, Klara Schabbel, Rose Schlösinger, Maria Terwiel, Frida Wesolek and Stanislaus Wesolek in Plötzensee prison.: AedW III, pp. 179, 232f., et al.	Schottmüller is mentioned several times in the novel. The scene of the execution of the members of the Red Orchestra on 5 August 1943 and other murders of resistance fighters against Nazism, choreographically described as a dance of death, is haunting.
	Kurt Schumacher 1905-1942 Sculptor	Fine Arts / Person Kurt Schumacher was a resistance fighter in the circle of the Red Orchestra. He was executed on 22 December 1942 in Plötzensee Prison in Berlin.: AedW III, pp. 184, 214 et al.	Mentioned several times, especially his farewell letter, in which he consoled himself, "the sculptor saw himself next to Riemenschneider, Veit Stoss and Jörg Ratgeb, who had all been drawn into the people's wars with their art".
	Tilman Riemenschneider 1460-1531 Sculptor	Fine Arts / Person Riemenschneider is considered one of the most important carvers and sculptors in the transition from the late Gothic to the Renaissance.: AedW III, p. 214	The sculptor mentioned by Kurt Schumacher in his farewell letter was arrested and tortured after his involvement in the Peasants' Wars
	Jerg Ratgeb 1480-1526 Sculptor	Fine Arts / Person Ratgeb lost his rights as a citizen of Heilbronn because of his marriage to a serf and moved to Stuttgart. As a member of the council, he negotiated with the rebellious peasants in 1525, by whom he was elected as war councillor and chancellor. After the suppression of the rebels, he was accused of high treason and executed in Pforzheim in 1526.: AedW III, p. 214	Kurt Schumacher includes the sculptor in his farewell letter.
	Veit Stoss 1447-1533 Sculptor	Fine Arts / Person Veit Stoss is considered one of the most important sculptors and carvers of the late Gothic period.: AedW III, p. 214	The sculptor mentioned by Kurt Schumacher in his farewell letter was branded on both cheeks with red-hot iron after being charged with forgery of documents.
	Hilde Rubinstein 1904-1997 Painter and poet	Fine Arts / Person Hilde Rubinstein was imprisoned as a member of the Communist Party of Germany in 1933, was able to emigrate via Belgium and the Netherlands in 1934 and reached Sweden in 1935. In 1936 and 1937 she lived in the Soviet Union, but was threatened with extradition to the German Reich for Trotskyist activities. She fled to Sweden again via Poland and Latvia. She secured her livelihood with various temporary jobs, and later worked as a painter and writer. After the war she stayed in Gothenburg.: AedW III, p. 152, 252	Mentioned among many other listed artists who had made odysseys and sought opportunities for their artistic work in Swedish exile.

== See also ==
- Works of art in The Aesthetics of Resistance

== Bibliography ==
- Badenberg, Nana (1995). "Kommentiertes Verzeichnis der in der Ästhetik des Wider-stands erwähnten bildenden Künstler und Kunstwerke". In Honold, Alexander; Schreiber, Ulrich (eds.). Die Bilderwelt des Peter Weiss (in German) (1st ed.). Hamburg: Argument-Verlag. pp. 163–231. ISBN 9783886192274.
- Weiss, Peter (1988). Aesthetik des Widerstands. Edition Suhrkamp, 1501 (in German). Vol. I. Frankfurt: Suhrkamp. ISBN 9783518115015. OCLC 1283249147.
- Weiss, Peter (1988). Aesthetik des Widerstands. Edition Suhrkamp, 1501 (in German). Vol. II. Frankfurt: Suhrkamp. ISBN 9783518115015. OCLC 1283249147.
- Weiss, Peter (1988). Aesthetik des Widerstands. Edition Suhrkamp, 1501 (in German). Vol. III. Frankfurt: Suhrkamp. ISBN 9783518115015. OCLC 1283249147.
