= Weltbühne trial =

1931 treason trial against Carl von Ossietzky

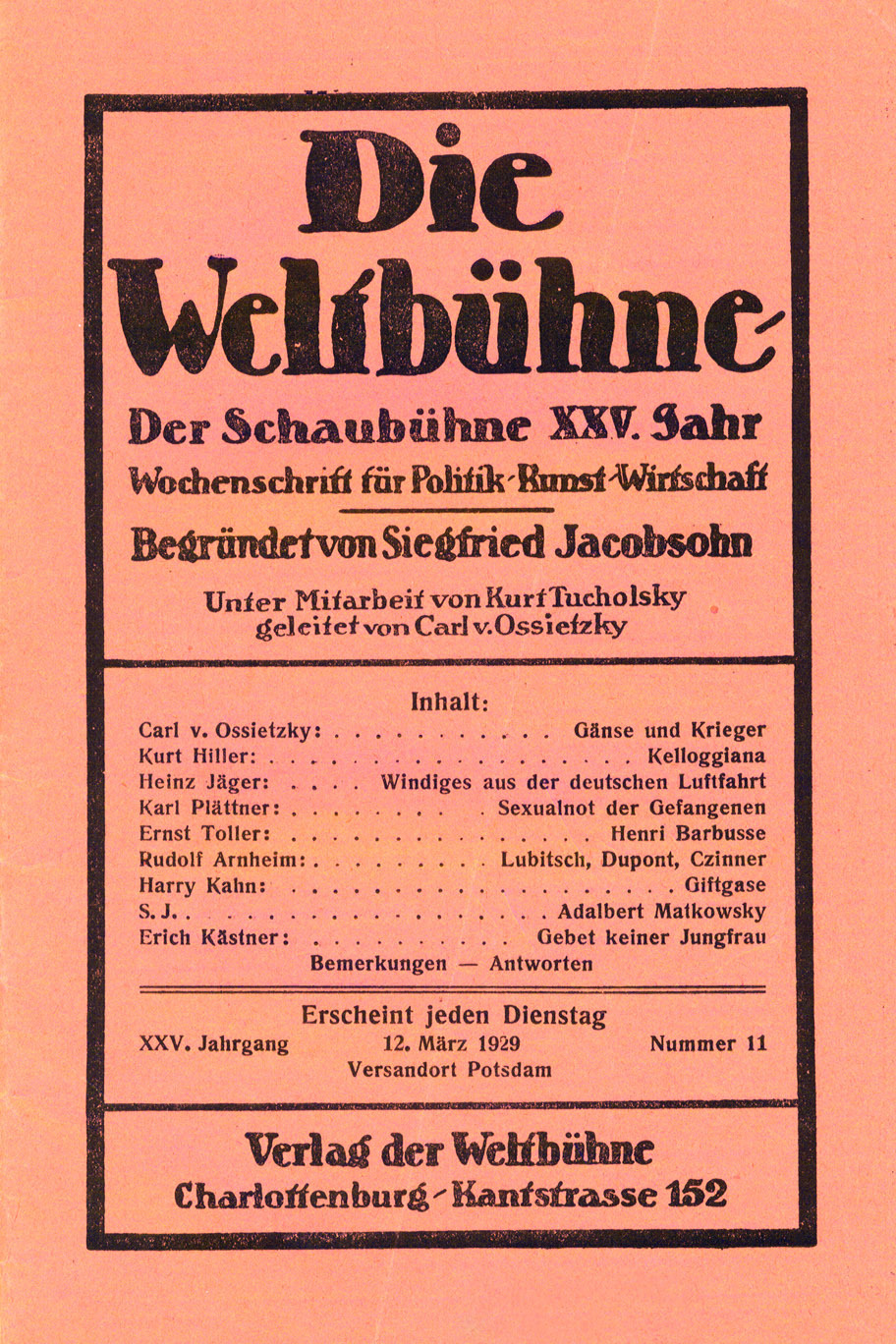
Weltbühne from 12 March 1929

The Weltbühne trial was an important criminal proceeding during the Weimar Republic against the press and journalists who were critical of the military. The editor of the weekly Die Weltbühne, Carl von Ossietzky, and the journalist and aviation expert Walter Kreiser were charged with treason and betrayal of military secrets for revealing that the Reichswehr was secretly building up an air force in violation of the Treaty of Versailles. They were sentenced in November 1931 to 18 months imprisonment. The outcome of the trial raised a considerable outcry among the German political left and in the foreign press, which saw it as evidence that Germany was returning to its prewar militarism.

Kreiser avoided prison by fleeing to France. Ossietzky was released from prison under a Christmas amnesty after serving just under eight months.

== Background ==
=== Treaty of Versailles ===
After its defeat in World War I, Germany had to agree to the severe limitations on its military forces imposed by the Treaty of Versailles. Even though it had signed the treaty, the Reich government and the Reichswehr systematically attempted to undermine its provisions. In particular, they tried from the beginning to circumvent the limitation of the German army to a maximum strength of 100,000 men. Influential circles in the government and the Reichswehr secretly supported the establishment of paramilitary units and set up illegal arms caches. These paramilitary associations, which had emerged from the Freikorps of the immediate postwar period and were also referred to as the Black Reichswehr, were a constant source of insecurity in German domestic politics.

Pacifist and anti-militarist circles in the Weimar Republic saw the behavior of the Reichswehr as a danger to internal peace as well as to the foreign policy of the German Reich. Various publications drew attention to the abuses. A story in the Weltbühne about the Feme murders committed by the Black Reichswehr against those they considered traitors led to several criminal proceedings against the perpetrators. From the beginning of the Weimar Republic, however, the legal processing of these crimes was hampered by partisanship. The Reich court of justice (Reichsgericht) ruled in favor of the Feme murderers, stating "that the individual citizen has a right of self-defense against unlawful attacks on the vital interests of the state". Pacifists who had betrayed illegal weapons caches were sentenced to 10 to 15 years in prison for treason.

=== The incriminating article ===
Among the journalists who paid particularly close attention to the clandestine buildup of the German military, and specifically to the air force, was aircraft designer Walter Kreiser. Between 1925 and 1927 he published seven articles on aviation in the Weltbühne under the pseudonym Konrad Widerhold. At the beginning of 1929 he offered the journal a new article whose publication he hoped would have a significant impact. This was the article that led to the Weltbühne trial.

Against the contemporary political background, it is not surprising that the article Windiges aus der deutschen Luftfahrt (‘Stormy Matters from German Aviation’) published under the pseudonym Heinz Jäger in the Weltbühne on 12 March 1929 aroused the displeasure of the Reichswehr. In the five-and-a-half-page article, Kreiser first addressed general questions about the situation of German aviation before devoting the last page and a half to the links between the Reichswehr and the aviation industry. From this section it emerged that the Reichswehr was apparently engaged in the clandestine buildup of an air force in violation of the Treaty of Versailles. It was working with Lufthansa at its special flight center on the coast, and with the German Research Institute for Aviation at the Johannisthal-Adlershof airfield, where it had a secret military department.

== The proceedings ==
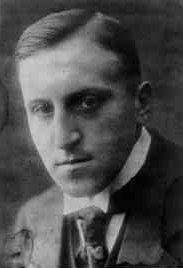
Carl von Ossietzky (1915)

On 1 August 1929 a criminal complaint was filed. The chief Reich prosecutor informed the Prussian minister of the interior that a preliminary investigation had been initiated because of the article. The grounds were that Ossietzky and Kreiser had publicized information about national defense that the German state had reason to keep secret from other governments, and that the publication had thus endangered the security of the Reich. In the course of the investigation, the editorial offices of Weltbühne and Ossietzky's apartment were searched. Later that August Ossietzky himself was questioned about the case.

=== Political implications ===
In spite of the criminal complaint, the Reich government found itself in a dilemma as a result of the publication of the article. If they had ignored or merely denied it, they would have run the risk that further details from the clandestine rearmament efforts would leak out. Taking strong action against the author and publisher was on the other hand tantamount to admitting that the German Reich was indeed violating the terms of the Versailles Treaty and secretly building up an air force. The interests of the Reichswehr ministry and the foreign office were as a result very much at odds.

The Reich ministry of defense must have been very concerned not to endanger the important military cooperation with the Soviet Union in the rearmament project (see the Treaty of Rapallo 1922). The foreign office, on the other hand, had to consider the fact that the Reich's negotiating position in the upcoming Geneva Disarmament Conference would be threatened by a public trial. The fact that the start of the trial was delayed for so long is attributed to the resistance of the foreign ministry, which was led by Gustav Stresemann until his death in October 1929. His office raised the question as to whether the information in the article had indeed been secret.

The proceedings were nevertheless not terminated. In the spring of 1931, the three ministries involved finally agreed on a compromise in order to be able to open legal proceedings. More than two years after the article appeared, charges were filed on 30 March 1931, and the trial was scheduled to begin on 8 May.

=== Jurists ===
On the side of the public prosecutor's office and the Reich court, the Weltbühne had to deal with lawyers who had already gained notoriety in the field. Reich attorney Paul Jorns, under whose direction the indictment against Ossietzky was drafted, had been involved in the investigation of the murders of Karl Liebknecht and Rosa Luxemburg and had destroyed evidence. The chairman of the fourth criminal senate, Alexander Baumgarten, had presided over the Ulm Reichswehr trial in the fall of 1930 at which Adolf Hitler had made his 'declaration of legality'.

The defense of the defendants was handled by the well-known lawyers Max Alsberg, Kurt Rosenfeld, Alfred Apfel and Rudolf Olden.

=== Trial ===
The proceedings were immediately adjourned because no representative of the foreign ministry had appeared. The defense had insisted that, in addition to the Reich ministry of defense, the foreign office should also send an expert who was to answer the question of whether the article had contained information that was unknown to foreign countries. The foreign ministry, however, let the court date slip and continued to have serious misgivings about the foreign policy impact of the proceedings. Finally, on 24 August 1931, under pressure from General and later Reich Chancellor Kurt von Schleicher, the foreign office prepared a written opinion that was read during the trial.

The trial, which excluded the press and public, finally took place on 17 and 19 November 1931. Major Himer of the Reich ministry of the armed forces and minister Wegerdt of the ministry of transport acted as witnesses for the prosecution. They asserted that the information in the article was true and should have been kept secret in the interest of national defense. Major Himer was convinced that the article had also been evaluated by foreign intelligence agencies. He was, however, unable to provide any proof of this.

The court rejected all 19 witnesses for the defense. The main request for evidence was also not heard by the judges. In it, the defense had wanted to prove that the reported activities had long been known abroad. Ossietzky himself argued on his own behalf that the article was only intended to criticize the budget. The formulations in the section that was objected to were largely his own and were hardly comprehensible to the uninformed public. His purpose was to warn the Reich Ministry of Defense before the matter became a public scandal.

=== Verdict ===
The trial ended on 23 November with von Ossietzky and Kreiser sentenced to the 18-month prison terms demanded by the prosecution for crimes committed under the law against betrayal of military secrets.

In its reasoning the court argued that, according to the experts, the defendants had indeed disseminated information that was meant to be kept secret. The concept of secrecy, it said, was in this case only a relative one. It was irrelevant whether the activities had already been known within certain circles. The court emphasized that a citizen must remain loyal to his country and may not arbitrarily denounce the violation of international treaties. The court justified the required intent using the fact that the defendants were pacifists. This supported the court's conclusion that they wished their work to have an anti-military effect. Because of this, a desire to uncover something that was kept secret by the military would "inevitably" result.

The fact that the conviction was not based on the Treason Act did not mean, in the court's view, that the defendants had not met the relevant elements of the statutory offense. Rather, the court was of the opinion that the more specific criminal offense of the Espionage Act superseded the likewise relevant Treason Act of the Criminal Code.

== Consequences of the verdict ==
=== Political reaction ===
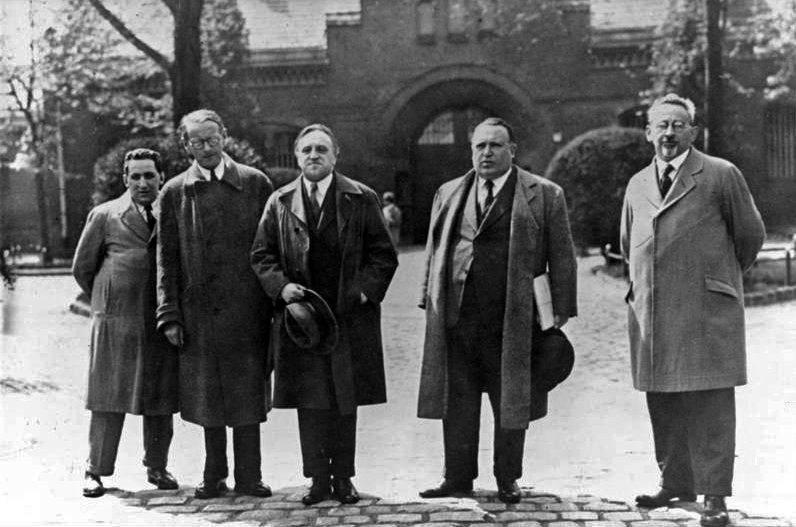
Carl von Ossietzky before Berlin-Tegel prison; from the left: Kurt Grossmann, Rudolf Olden, Carl von Ossietzky, Alfred Apfel, Kurt Rosenfeld. (1932)

Ossietzky reacted to the sentence with sarcasm. "One and a half years in prison? It's not so bad, because freedom in Germany leaves much to be desired. The difference between those who are in prison and those who aren’t is fading." He said that the verdict did not surprise him, even though he had not thought such an outcome to the trial was conceivable: "I know that every journalist who deals critically with the Reichswehr has to expect a trial for treason; that is a natural occupational risk. Nevertheless, this time a delightful change was provided: we left the hall not as traitors to the country, but as spies."

The reaction to the verdict both in Germany and abroad was considerable. In its issues of 1 December and 15 December 1931, the Weltbühne published numerous comments from the foreign press about the trial, the tenor of which is expressed in the following passage from the New York Evening Post:

First, it is the harshest sentence ever passed on a non-Communist journalist, and it is typical of the rigorous treatment now meted out by German courts to anyone who disagrees with a return to Germany’s prewar militarism. Second, one should assume that the government, or at least the foreign office, would not approve of this ruling, since it draws public attention to events that might otherwise have long ago been forgotten or overlooked. Germany, whose argument before the Geneva Disarmament Conference was always that the conditions of the Versailles Treaty had been fulfilled and that it had completely disarmed, will now have to defend itself against renewed accusations that it is maintaining a prohibited air force. In the future, critics will refer less to the Weltbühne article than to the court, which considered the article so dangerous that it punished Ossietzky with eighteen months in prison. There is no appeal and he [...] must serve this long sentence. It is characteristic of the tenor of German courts that National Socialist traitors are always sentenced more leniently, usually with a custodial punishment, while a liberal critic of militarism is imprisoned with common criminals.

In Germany, too, many democratic politicians were appalled. Reichstag President Paul Löbe wrote: "I have seldom felt a verdict to be such a miscarriage, not only in legal but also in political terms, as this one [...] To my knowledge, nothing was written that could be either hidden from or useful to foreign countries, so that the verdict seems to me completely incomprehensible." After the verdict, various organizations tried to prevent Ossietzky from having to serve the prison sentence. In the Reichstag, for example, the Social Democratic Party (SPD) sent a formal parliamentary request to the Reich government asking whether it was prepared to "take all steps to prevent the execution of this verdict of the Reich court". There were protest meetings and signature campaigns by the German League for Human Rights. Many prominent writers and scientists, such as Thomas Mann, Heinrich Mann, Arnold Zweig, and Albert Einstein, supported a last-minute plea for clemency to Reich President Paul von Hindenburg to stop the implementation of the verdict. But the justice ministry did not even pass the request on to Hindenburg. Thus von Ossietzky began his prison sentence in Berlin's Tegel Prison on 10 May 1932. Walter Kreiser had fled to France immediately after the verdict and thus evaded imprisonment. For his part Ossietzky argued:

There is one thing about which there should be no mistake, and I emphasize this for all friends and opponents and especially for those who will be looking after my legal and physical well-being during the next eighteen months: I am not going to prison for reasons of loyalty, but because I am most inconvenient when incarcerated. I do not bow to the majesty of the Reich court draped in red velvet but remain, as an inmate of a Prussian penitentiary, a living demonstration against a judgment of the highest court which appears to be politically biased and as a legal work badly warped.

As the result of a Christmas amnesty for political prisoners, Ossietzky was released on 22 December 1932, after 227 days in prison.

=== Legal assessment ===
The trial represented one of the sharpest attacks by the Reichswehr and the judiciary against the critical press during the Weimar Republic. Moreover, it had become clear to foreign countries that Germany obviously no longer intended to observe important points of the Versailles Treaty. Even during Ossietzky's imprisonment in a concentration camp – he was arrested by the Nazis after the Reichstag Fire on 28 February 1933 – he was still to feel the consequences of his conviction. For example, in the dispute over the 1935 Nobel Peace Prize that was awarded to him "for his struggle against Germany's rearmament", some argued that he was, after all, a convicted traitor to his country.

The verdict is seen by today's jurists as an important step on the road to Nazi justice. The Reich court had established its own legal system, which was not based on laws and the constitution, but on unclear concepts ("treason against the fatherland", "the citizen's duty of loyalty", "the welfare of the state").

Jungfer and Müller wrote: "Reich attorney Niethammer acknowledged that it was a 'trendsetting' service to Nazi law, and the 'national' defender Alfons Sack praised the Reich court for its 'courageous step [...] against the letter of the constitution in helping the new idea of the state to victory'. In so doing it had made its contribution to the 'creation of the new law, for which alone the safeguarding of the German people forms the standard.’ In somewhat different words, Ossietzky defender Olden described the same thing: ‘From here comes that rottenness of law and of the sense of justice which leads the supreme court to the National Socialist twisting of all legal concepts, to the legitimization of murder when it serves the 'welfare of the state.’’”

After his conviction, Ossietzky conceded that the Republic had at least preserved "the decorum of legal procedure”. He wrote, however, in the Weltbühne of 1 December 1931: “Once the Third Reich is governed according to Boxheim's platform [1931 plans for a Nazi takeover crafted by German lawyer Werner Best], then traitors like Kreiser and I will be shot without a fuss."

== Literature ==
=== Sources ===
- Die Weltbühne. Vollständiger Nachdruck der Jahrgänge 1918–1933. Athenäum Verlag, Königstein/Ts. 1978, ISBN 3-7610-9301-2.
- Auswärtiges Amt: Geheimakten der Alten Rechtsabteilung, Rechtssache: Strafverfahren wegen Landesverrat gegen Schriftleiter Carl von Ossietzky, Bände 1 und 2 (unveröffentlicht)
- Kammergericht Berlin 1. Strafsenat, Beschluss vom 11. Juli 1991, Az: (1) 1 AR 356/90 (4/90), veröffentlicht in: Neue Juristische Wochenschrift (NJW). Beck, München/ Frankfurt M 1991, S. 2505–2507. ISSN 0341-1915
- BGH 3. Strafsenat, Beschluss vom 3. Dezember 1992, Az: StB 6/92, veröffentlicht in: BGHSt 39, S. 75–87.
- Carl von Ossietzky: Sämtliche Schriften. Herausgegeben von Bärbel Boldt u.a. Band VII: Briefe und Lebensdokumente. Reinbek 1994.

=== Secondary literature ===
- Hannover, Heinrich: Die Republik vor Gericht 1975–1995. Erinnerungen eines unbequemen Rechtsanwalts. Aufbau-Taschenbuch-Verlag, Berlin 2003, ISBN 3-7466-7032-2.
- Lang, Dieter: Staat, Recht und Justiz im Kommentar der Zeitschrift „Die Weltbühne“. P. Lang, Frankfurt am Main 1996, ISBN 3-631-30376-9.
- Suhr, Elke: Carl von Ossietzky. Eine Biographie. Kiepenheuer & Witsch, Köln 1988, ISBN 3-462-01885-X.

==== Articles ====
- Jungfer, Gerhard, Müller, Ingo: 70 Jahre Weltbühnen-Urteil. In: Neue Juristische Wochenschrift (NJW). Beck, München/Frankfurt (Main) 2001, p. 3461–3465. ISSN 0341-1915
- Heiliger, Ivo (Pseudonym von Ingo Müller): Windiges aus der deutschen Rechtsprechung. In: Kritische Justiz (KJ). Nomos, Baden-Baden 1993, p. 194–198. ISSN 0023-4834
- Suhr, Elke: „Zu den Hintergründen des Weltbühnen'-Prozesses.“ In: Allein mit dem Wort. Erich Mühsam, Carl von Ossietzky, Kurt Tucholsky. Schriftstellerprozesse in der Weimarer Republik. Schriften der Erich-Mühsam-Gesellschaft. Heft 14, Lübeck 1997, ISBN 3-931079-17-1, p. 54–69.
