= Hermann Budzislawski =

German journalist (1901–1978)

- Born: 11 February 1901; Berlin, German Empire
- Died: 28 April 1978 (aged 77); East Berlin, East Germany
- Occupations: Journalist; Editor; Academic (Leipzig)
- Political party: SPD (1929-1933); SED (1948-1978)
- Spouse: Johanna "Hanna" Levy/Budzislawski (1901-?)
- Children: Beate Budzislawski/Eckert (1929-?)
- Parent: Isidor Budzislawski (1866-?)

Hermann Budzislawski (11 February 1901 – 28 April 1978) was a German journalist with a particular focus on economics and politics, who used the pseudonyms Hermann Eschwege and Donald Bell. As a young man in the 1930s, he came to prominence as editor in chief of the political weekly magazine Die Weltbühne during the publication's period in exile. After 1945, he returned from a period of several years in New York City to resume his journalistic work and to become a radio commentator with Mitteldeutscher Rundfunk, based in Leipzig, where he also now pursued a successful career as a professor of media sciences at the university.

== Life ==
=== Early years ===
Hermann Budzislawski was born in Berlin in 1901. His father was a master-butcher. As a child he attended the Boys' School of the Berlin Jewish community before progressing to senior school where he passed his School final exams (Abitur) in 1919.

Budzislawski undertook his university-level education between 1919 and 1923 at Berlin, Würzburg und Tübingen, emerging with a doctorate in 1923 for a dissertation entitled "Eugenics: A contribution on the economics of human genes" (" Eugenik. Ein Beitrag zur Oekonomie der menschlichen Erbanlagen"), after which he worked for a period as a businessman. He soon turned to journalism, in 1924/25 working as the editor for a Berlin-based publication called the "Industrial and Trade Review for India". The next year 1925/26, found him working as a private tutor in Fiesole. 1926 was also the year in which Hermann Budzislawski married Johanna Levy. Between 1926 and 1933 he worked as a correspondent for the Nachtexpress and Weltbühne, based in Berlin.

Between 1929 and 1933 Budzislawski was a member of the moderate left-wing Social Democratic Party (SPD). In 1932 he applied to join the Communist Party, but was talked out of it by Walter Ulbricht who advised him, instead, to remain within the SPD to help with closer liaison between the two parties. Meanwhile, he opposed the rise of the NSDAP (Nazi party) with his journalism.

=== Nazi years and beyond ===
Régime change came to Germany early in 1933 and the Hitler government lost little time in moving to a system of one-party dictatorship. Membership of a political party (other than of the Nazi party) became illegal. Budzislawski fled in March 1933 to Zürich. Here, till September 1933, and working under the pseudonym "Hermann Fischli", he worked as a journalist for the Berlin office of the Frankfurter Zeitung. In November 1933, helped by Emil Walter, he established the anti-Fascist "Neue Presse Korresp." press association. In January 1934 he moved on again, this time to Prague, where between 1934 and 1938 he worked as the chairman of the German Popular front committee. Along with that he was the producer and managing editor of Die neue Weltbühne, a German political weekly magazine which had not been produced in Germany since March 1933. During 1938 Czechoslovakia was progressively invaded and taken over by Nazi Germany, and in October 1938 production of Die neue Weltbühne restarted in Paris, where Budzislawski had arrived from Prague in May of that year. The last Paris produced edition of Weltbühne appeared on 31 August 1939.

The government in Berlin was not blind to Budzislawski's activities, and in 1935 he was stripped of his German citizenship, taking Czechoslovak citizenship in 1938. By the time he arrived in Paris in 1938 Paris had become the de facto headquarters of the exiled German communist party, and while available sources are silent over whether he ever actually joined the Communist Party, he certainly had secret contacts with German opposition politicians, including Communists, while he was at liberty in the French capital. In September 1939 the French authorities banned Die neue Weltbühne. It was also in September 1939 that he angrily broke off any links with the exiled German Communists over their support for the no longer secret non-aggression pact between the Soviet Union and Nazi Germany.

Having prevaricated between defiance and appeasement over the German occupation of Czechoslovakia during 1938, when the Germans invaded Poland in September 1939 the French government (like the British) promptly declared war against Germany. Apart from the impressively underwhelming "Saar Offensive" it would be another eight months before the military aspects of war began to unfold in France, but in the meantime, the government took action on the home front. Large numbers of political exiles and other German Jews who had fled to France to escape government persecution at home were promptly redefined as enemy aliens, arrested, and in a somewhat chaotic exercise taken to internment camps in the south of the country. Before the end of Hermann Budzislawski was among the detainees. However, in 1940 he was able to escape detention with help from the New York–based Emergency Rescue Committee, and fled to Portugal (which remained neutral during World War II). In October 1940, helped by the Unitarian Universalist Service Committee, he emigrated to the United States.

Hermann Budzislawski lived in New York City between 1940 and 1944, becoming a leading member of the German community in exile. He worked closely with Dorothy Thompson, between 1941 and 1945 described in sources variously as her assistant, her secretary and her ghostwriter. Between 1943 and September 1948 he also wrote as a columnist and commentator for the liberal/leftwing New York-based "Overseas News Agency", using the pseudonym "Donald Bell", though among those who took an interest was nothing secret about the true identity of Donald Bell. In May 1944 he participated in the creation, in New York City, of the Council for a Democratic Germany. seen by some as a belated response to the establishment in July 1943 of an equivalent organisation in Moscow. When he left New York and returned to Germany Budzislawski did so, at least in part as a reaction to the activities of Joseph McCarthy and the senator's fellow travelers, fearing that he was about to be identified as a Communist and face attack for alleged Un-American Activities.

=== East Germany ===
Arriving in the Soviet occupation zone of what had been Germany in September 1948, Hermann Budzislawski lost little time in joining the recently formed Socialist Unity Party (Sozialistische Einheitspartei Deutschlands / SED). The next year, in October 1949, the Soviet administered occupation zone gave way to the Soviet sponsored German Democratic Republic (East Germany). Budzislawski quickly obtained a job as a political commentator with Mitteldeutscher Rundfunk. In 1949 he joined the new country's Association of German Journalists (Verband der Journalisten der DDR / VDJ). Additionally, for most of the period between 1948 and 1953 he worked as a Professor for International Journalism at the Sociology and Philosophy faculties at Leipzig University, where between 1954 and 1963 he served as dean of the newly created faculty of journalism. His rise within the East German establishment was not uninterrupted, however: in the spirit of brittle paranoia characteristic of communist party leaderships during the final years of Stalin's life, Budzislawski was stripped of all his functions in November 1950 because of suspicions triggered by the years he had spent in "the west". A period of virtual unemployment ensued. By the end of 1952, however, he had been reinstated, and the hiatus in his career is still (2015) not mentioned in the biographical note of his career provided by the university. Political duties accompanied academic preferment: between 1958 and 1966 he sat as a member of the East German National Legislature (Volkskammer) (an institution of vanishingly little political influence before 1990).

Till 1967 Budzislawski taught at the Karl Marx University (as Leipzig University was known between 1953 and 1991), in 1953 he had become Director of the Press History Institute and of the Institute for the Theory and Practice of Press work, along with his other posts and titles. At the same time, he continued to work as a political commentator on East German talk radio, also deputising briefly for Karl-Eduard von Schnitzler on television in 1958. Over many years his written and spoken output influenced the so-called "Socialist journalism" that became a feature of the German Democratic Republic, with its recognisable referencing of Lenin's "Theory of the Press" which required journalists to operate as "collective propagandists, agitators and [political] organisers" ("kollektiven Propagandisten, Agitator und Organisator"). From across the internal frontier that separated the two Germanys, the news magazine Der Spiegel, which for more than forty years kept robustly mistrustful watch over political developments in East Germany, in 1972 described Budzislawski as "Leipzig's journalist-pope" (der "Leipziger Journalistik-Papst").

There were those who believed they detected signs of "revisionist" liberalism, picked up during the years working as a journalist in New York, in his output, even while others celebrated Budzislawski as the high-priest of East Germany's journalism establishment. Despite dismissing western tabloid newspapers as mere sensation sheets, Budzislawski was not beyond a certain amount of socialist sensationalising of his own, evidenced by an above-average propensity to personalise and emotionalise his reports, while not hesitating on occasion to highlight the individual heroism of some pioneer of socialism selected for media exposure. Since Budzislawski's death in 1978, and especially following the demise of a separate East Germany in 1989 and reunification the following year, more evidence has come to light concerning the extent of the difficulties experienced by Budzislawski and other "remigrants" back from the USA to East Germany after 1945, in adapting to the needs of a state that needed to control and monitor the actions of its citizens to an extent which would, at that time, have been unthinkable in "the west". Budzislawski's grandson, Thomas Eckert (1953–1994), who also became a journalist, spent several years working on Budzislawski's papers while preparing to submit a dissertation for a doctorate. Eckert himself died suddenly in 1994 and the dissertation was never completed, but his notes have provided a valuable resource for subsequent researchers on Hermann Budzislawski's sometimes difficult career between 1948 and his death in 1978.

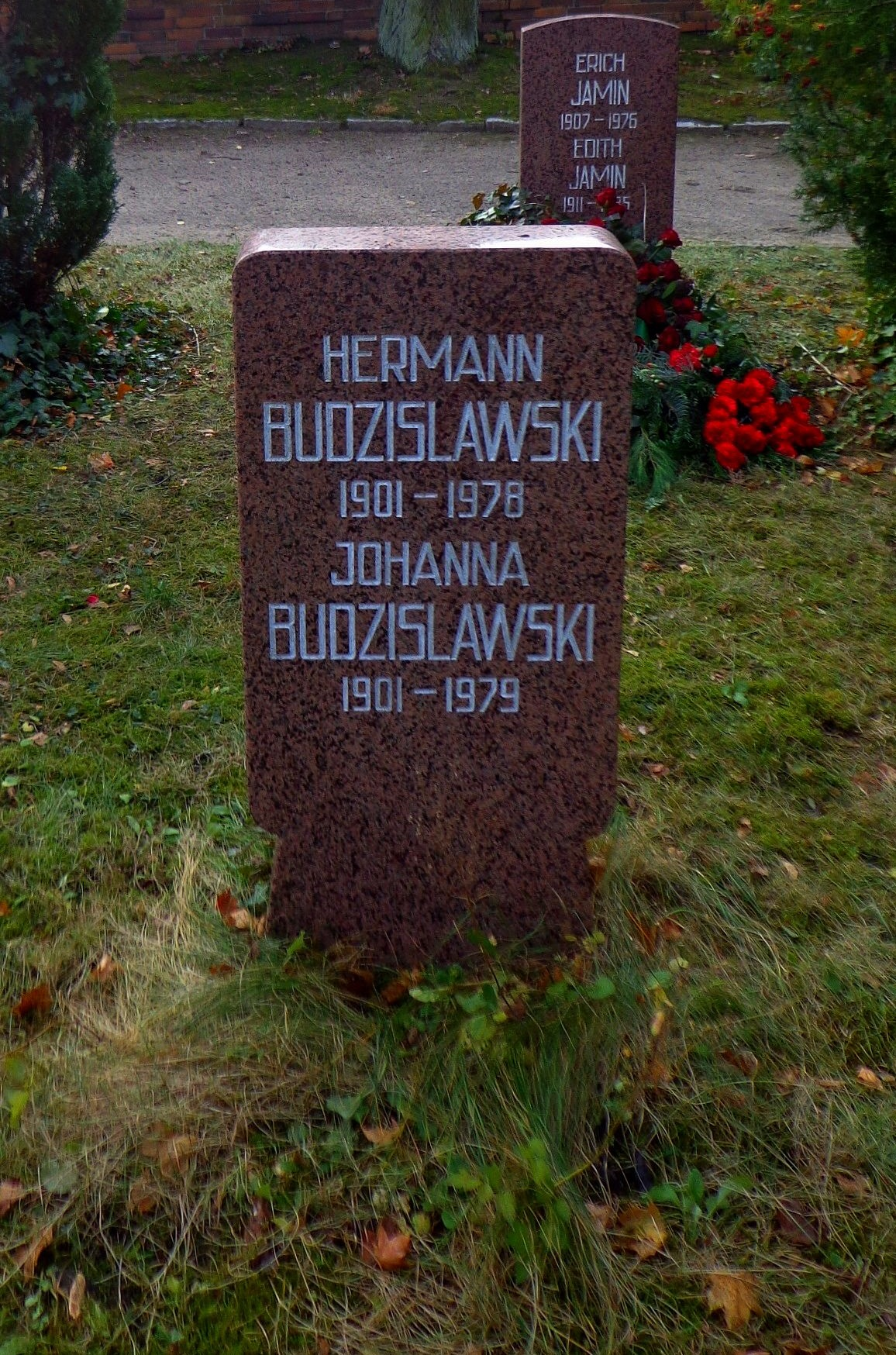
Grave of Hermann Budzislawski

== Awards and honours ==
- 1955 Fritz Heckert Medal
- 1957 Patriotic Order of Merit in Silver
- 1959 Banner of Labor
- 1970 Patriotic Order of Merit in Gold
- 1974 Patriotic Order of Merit Gold clasp
- 1976 Star of People's Friendship
