= Walter Kreiser =

German aircraft designer and journalist

Walter Kreiser (10 February 1898 – 1958) was a German aircraft designer and journalist best known for publishing an article in the magazine Die Weltbühne (‘The World Stage’) in 1929 which exposed the secret creation of a German Air Force in violation of the Treaty of Versailles. Its publication resulted in him being convicted in 1931 of espionage in the Weltbühne Trial. He and future (1935) Nobel Peace Prize winner Carl von Ossietzky received 18 months in prison.

== Biography ==
=== Aircraft expert ===
Kreiser was born in 1898 in Heilbronn, the son of a master butcher who died in 1903. After attending elementary school in Heilbronn for three years, he transferred to the vocational school there. He left it in December 1914 to join the German army as a volunteer. During the course of World War I, he was deployed to the Western, Eastern, and Balkan fronts as an artillery observer with field aviation detachments. He was wounded twice and suffered gas poisoning. In 1919 he was discharged from the army as a staff sergeant and returned to live with his mother in Heilbronn.

Since he had earned the equivalent of a high school diploma during the war, Kreiser wanted to study to become an engineer. He worked for several years as a factory assemblyman before he began studying aircraft engineering at the technical university in Stuttgart in 1923. At the same time he took part in glider flights on the Wasserkuppe in the Rhön Mountains and worked at the Aeronautical Society in Stuttgart. He gave up his studies for financial reasons in the spring of 1924 because his family had lost its savings in the hyperinflation. He then became a journalist (see below) while also continuing his aeronautical research. Kreiser was one of the pioneers of helicopter development in Germany in the 1920s. With Walter Rieseler he designed various models which were patented in 1926. Beginning in 1926, he collaborated with the aviation division affiliated with the German Transport Association and later took over its management. In the spring of 1929 he became one of the co-founders of the Sturmvogel (‘Albatross’), a "flying association for working people". He also worked for a time at the airfield at Johannisthal Air Field in Berlin. In 1930 Kreiser and Rieseler went to the USA to join the Pennsylvania Aircraft Syndicate Ltd., headed by aviation pioneer E. Burke Wilford. There, on 5 August 1931, he took part in the successful test flight of a gyroplane with a four-blade rotor. Because of the hearings for the Weltbühne Trial (see below), Kreiser returned to Germany in 1931.

=== Journalist ===
After breaking off his studies in 1924, Kreiser turned increasingly to journalism. He initially worked as a sports reporter in Stuttgart, and from Ludwigsburg he wrote for the Stuttgarter Tageblatt and other newspapers in Württemberg and the Rhineland. With the recommendation of Erich Schairer, the editor of the Sonntagszeitung, Kreiser went to Berlin in 1925. There, too, he reported on sporting events, for the Berliner Tageblatt and other newspapers. During the same period he made contact with pacifist organizations. In a letter written in August 1925, he described himself as the "only person in pacifist circles who has precise insight into aviation". He therefore worked for the German League for Human Rights as an expert on aviation issues. After 1926 he was co-editor of Deutsche Militärkorrespondenz (‘German Military Correspondence’). From 1925 to 1927 he also published numerous articles on aviation policy in the Berlin weekly Die Weltbühne and in Schairer's Sonntagszeitung under the pseudonym Konrad Widerhold. Because of his collaboration on the work Die deutsche Militärpolitik seit 1918 (‘German Military Policy Since 1918’), proceedings were initiated against him in 1926 for treason and betrayal of military secrets, but these were dropped in 1928. In 1929 Kreiser joined the Social Democratic Party (SPD), but by 1931 he was no longer a member.

=== The Weltbühne trial ===
On 12 March 1929 Kreiser published the article Windiges aus der deutschen Luftfahrt (‘Stormy Matters from German Aviation’) in the Weltbühne under the pseudonym Heinz Jäger. In the extensive five-and-a-half-page article, Kreiser first dealt with general questions about the situation of German aviation before devoting the last page and a half to the links between the Reichswehr and the aviation industry. From this section it emerged that the Reichswehr was apparently working with Lufthansa to secretly build up an air force. According to his research, Lufthansa operated a flight division on the coast, and at the Johannisthal-Adlershof airfield there was a secret department M run by the German Aviation Company. These installations were a blatant violation of the Treaty of Versailles by Germany and the Reichswehr.

The article made the magazine known worldwide and resulted in charges being filed against Kreiser and the Weltbühne’s editor, Carl von Ossietzky. The proceedings, known as the Weltbühne Trial, ended in 1931 with the two men being sentenced to 18 months in prison for betraying military secrets. Ossietzky served seven months of his sentence before being released at the end of 1932 under a Christmas amnesty, but Kreiser fled to France eight days after the sentence was pronounced on 23 November 1931.

There Kreiser subsequently published details of the trial proceedings in the nationalist newspaper L'Echo de Paris. Ossietzky strongly disapproved because the Reich Court, invoking the Espionage Act, had decreed that no details from the trial were to be made public. In a letter to Justice Minister Franz Gürtner, Ossietzky distanced himself from Kreiser's actions, but he could not prevent excerpts of Kreiser's reports from appearing in the pacifist journal Das Andere Deutschland (‘The Other Germany’). Beginning in April 1932, Kreiser also published a series of exposés on the Reichswehr in L'Echo de Paris, presumably in conjunction with the pacifist Friedrich Wilhelm Foerster. On 29 March 1934 the Deutscher Reichsanzeiger (‘German Reich Gazette’), the official newspaper of the German Reich, published the second expatriation list of the German Reich, by which Kreiser was expatriated.

=== In exile ===
Kreiser later went from France to Switzerland and in 1941 to Brazil. For the escape to South America, he joined the so-called Görgen Group led by the Saarland politician Hermann Mathias Görgen. It consisted of 48 people for whom Görgen had obtained Czech passports. Johannes Hoffmann, later prime minister of the Saarland, and the writer Ulrich Becher also fled to Brazil with Kreiser. Görgen is said to have described Kreiser as the member of his group who was most in danger.

According to Becher's wife Dana Roda Becher, Kreiser spent his early years in Brazil first at Juiz de Fora in the state of Minas Gerais and later in Rio de Janeiro. Görgens reported that Kreiser was brought to the refugee settlement of Rolândia (Paraná state) by Johannes Schauff in the 1940s. He is also said to have been involved in the construction of the town of Maringá (Paraná), where he died on an unknown date in 1958.
