= Feme murders =

Series of murders in Germany from 1919 to 1923

The Feme murders (German: Fememorde [ˈfeːməmɔʁdə]) were extrajudicial killings that took place during the early years of the Weimar Republic. They were carried out primarily by far-right groups against individuals, often their own members, who were thought to have betrayed them.

Due to their secretive nature, it is not known how many were killed in the Feme murders, which are most often considered a distinct category from political assassinations. The number may have been in the hundreds, although one source reports just 23 between 1920 and 1923 in Bavaria and the eastern states of East Prussia, Pomerania, Mecklenburg, Brandenburg and Upper Silesia. In spite of a number of investigations into the murders, few of the perpetrators were ever identified or prosecuted. The Feme murders had largely ended by 1924.

== Origin of the term ==
Fememord (from Middle High German vëme, meaning "punishment", and mord meaning "murder"), refers to an act of vigilante justice by a political group: the killing of "traitors" who knew about the group's secrets and had reported them to authorities or threatened to do so. The name alludes to the secretive Vehmic court system of medieval and early modern Westphalia, which had authority to ordain capital punishment.

In the politically heated turmoil of the early Weimar Republic, the media frequently used the term Fememord to refer to right-wing political killings by groups such as the Organisation Consul, e.g. the murder of Jewish politicians Kurt Eisner and Walther Rathenau and other politicians including Matthias Erzberger. In 1926, the 27th Reichstag commission officially differentiated political assassinations from Feme murders. Assassinations were by definition carried out against political opponents, whereas the commission defined Feme murders as "Attacks on human life on the basis of an organisation's or individual member's conspiracy against members and former members as well as against outsiders because of behaviour they consider treacherous or harmful to the community".

The meaning can also be seen in the phrase "Verräter verfallen der Feme!" ("Traitors fall to the Feme!"), which was in the statutes of the Organisation Consul and often used in mass media reports regarding violent acts of vengeance among the German right.

== Official responses ==
The first to attempt to study the phenomenon systematically and for all of Germany was the Jewish statistician Emil Julius Gumbel, who in 1929 published Verräter verfallen der Feme!“ Opfer – Mörder – Richter (1919–1929) ("Traitors fall to the Feme!" – Victims – Murderers – Judges (1919–1929)).

While the Weimar judiciary rigorously prosecuted leftists involved in the German revolution of 1918–1919 and in the political activities of the Bavarian Soviet Republic, police and judicial investigations of the Feme crimes were slow, and the murderers, if they were identified, often received lesser sentences or acquittals. Some military officers such as Paul Schulz of the Black Reichswehr were convicted and imprisoned before an amnesty for the Feme murders was declared in 1930, but Germans who exposed the killings were tried and convicted for insulting the military establishment for their role in doing so, even when their allegations against the military were true.

The deficiencies in law enforcement were matters of concern for several parliaments during the Weimar period. In 1920, the Bavarian Landtag set up its own investigative committee to look into the situation after former Reichswehr soldier Hans Dobner was unsuccessfully targeted when he attempted to sell information on a weapons cache to the authorities. In 1924, the Landtag of Prussia set up a "Political Murders" investigative committee, and two years later instituted a second. In November 1925, the journal Die Weltbühne published an unattributed article by Carl Mertens, a German officer and pacifist, about the Feme murders of more than twenty members of right-wing groups.

In January 1926, at the request of the Social Democratic Party of Germany (SPD), an investigative committee of the Reichstag was set up under the name "Feme Organizations and Feme Murders" to investigate the crimes and their political environment within parties, the Reichswehr and the judiciary. The project was hindered from the beginning by the right wing-majority in the Reichstag, the Bavarian judicial authorities' refusal to cooperate, and not least by the indecisiveness of the SPD itself.

== Victims ==
Nearly all of the Feme murders occurred during the turbulent early years of the Weimar Republic. A peak was reached in 1923 when hyperinflation, Allied occupation of the Ruhr and numerous putsch and separatist efforts shook Germany. Within the Black Reichswehr, First Lieutenant Paul Schulz commanded a special unit that killed those who were seen as having betrayed the country by leaking military secrets. He was implicated in the murder of Black Reichswehr Wachmeister Willi Legner, but was never tried.

In March 1925 Schulz was arrested for inciting several murders. Brought to trial, he was sentenced to death on 26 March 1927 for inciting the murder of Black Reichswehr Sergeant Walter Wilms. Also sentenced to death were First Lieutenant Fritz Fuhrmann and Sergeant Erich Klapproth, who carried out the murder. All three death sentences were commuted to life imprisonment by President Paul von Hindenburg in February 1928.

To large parts of the German right-wing he was considered a martyr. While in jail, Schulz was in contact with numerous right wing politicians, including Gregor Strasser of the Nazi Party. In May 1928, the 12 newly elected Nazi members of the Reichstag called for his release. A political amnesty was granted in October 1930 and Schulz obtained his freedom.

The following is a selected list of victims:

- July 1920: Willi Schmidt, (born 1899 in Stettin), a member of the Freikorps Roßbach, was shot by Edmund Heines and other members of the Freikorps in a forest in the Greifenhagen district of Pomerania and buried on the spot after being suspected of trying to reveal a weapons cache to the authorities.
- 6 October 1920: Maria Sandmayer (b. 1901), a maid, was found strangled in Forstenrieder Park in Munich. She was murdered after she tried to report a weapons cache of the Bavarian Citizens' Defense.
- 1921: Peter Christ, overseer, murdered in Langenöls, Breslau district. In 1921, Christ was a member of the Upper Silesian Self-Protection. Because of criticism he made of the corruption of the leadership, he was arrested by members of the German special police. He is said to have declared to comrades: "I am well informed that the money for our organization does not go to the responsible authorities. There is enough money, but we don't get it. It stays up so that the upper superiors can live well." He was later found with his head shot through. In 1928, a file note was found according to which the head of the executive branch of the German special police, Gottfried Hobus, was instructed to take Christ into "appropriate treatment". The State Commissioner for Upper Silesia, Karl Spiecker, called the case "scandalous" when it was presented to him in 1928 and assessed it as murder. He explained that Christ should have been brought before a court of law.
- 4 March 1921: Hans Hartung (b. 1897), a waiter, was shot and his body recovered from the Zusam River near Zusmarshausen in Bavaria. He was murdered after he tried to blackmail the Bavarian Citizens' Defense for his silence about their activities.
- 5 June 1921: Josef Nowak, St. Annaberg in Silesia, was seized on 4 June 1921 on suspicion of espionage in favour of the Polish side in the Silesian Uprisings. He was driven through his village by eight members of the Upper Silesian Self-Defense Force, beaten with sidearms and rifle butts, and then, after, Nowak, together with Ignatz Kwittek, Ignatz Kwiotek and Anton Wojciechowski, who were also accused of treason, driven to the basalt quarry near St. Annaberg and beaten and shot to death. The heads of each of the four men were split five to six times and chopped up with side guns like "rotten turnips". Nowak's body had four shots in the stomach, two shots in the chest, and seventy-three bayonet and knife stabs. The bodies were buried under stone rubble and found a few days later by their relatives. Nowak had merely said that he thought that the fighting between Germans and Poles in Upper Silesia was a senseless civil war.

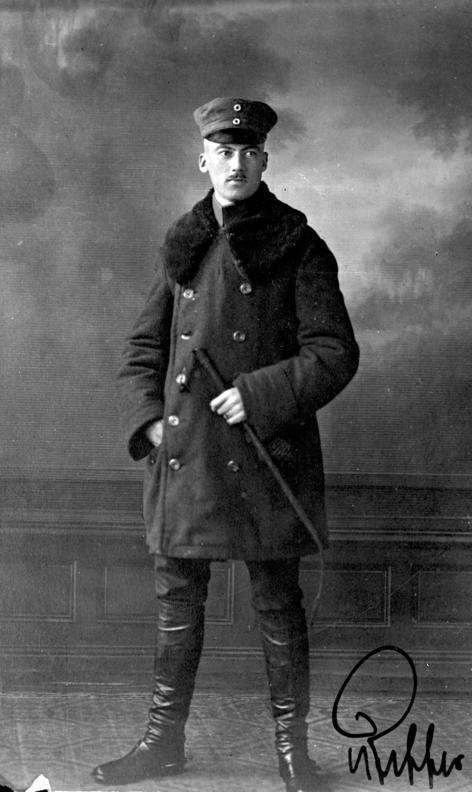
Franz Pfeffer von Salomon, founder of the “Freikorps von Pfeffer” which was actively involved in Feme murders.

- June 13, 1921: Johannes Buchholz: Police sergeant Johannes Buchholz, a member of the Berlin Police Hundred Association, was killed by a shot in the back of the head in the Schlosskaserne, a police barracks in Berlin-Charlottenburg. The background was that those responsible for right-wing radical machinations in this hundred feared that he would report them as well as financial deportations to the unit. Two police officers of the Hundred were charged with the death of Buchholz, but acquitted for lack of evidence.
- July/August 1921: Fritz Köhler, member of the self-protection organization Ehrhardt in Upper Silesia. As a member of a work detachment formed by members of this self-protection organization, Köhler was housed in the summer of 1921 as a field warden on the estate of the manor owner Ulrich Freiherr von Richthofen in Klein-Wandriß in the district of Liegnitz. He supervised the forester's lodge of the Kohlhöher Forest, which belonged to the estate. For unknown reasons, Köhler was suspected of being a traitor. When Köhler, together with three other members of the self-defense organization – Karl Ernst Scweninger, Martin Lampel and Veit Ulrich von Beulwitz – visited a secret weapons cache, Köhler was prompted to listen on the ground to see if groundwater was bubbling in the weapons depot. When he lay down on the ground for this purpose, he was hit on the head by Beulwitz with a pickaxe. He was then shot by Lampel, according to other statements by Beulwitz. Beulwitz, Schwinger and Lampel were later charged with joint intentional homicide. The proceedings were discontinued by order of 28 November 1930 in accordance with the Law on Immunity from Punishment of 14 July 1928 as amended on 24 October 1930.
- 29/30 August 1921: Four former members of the Upper Silesian Self-Protection near Sibyllenort, Oels district: In the night of 29 to 30 August 1921, four former members of the Upper Silesian Self-Protection, allegedly members of the Roßbach working group, were killed by shots to the head near Sibyllenort. The crime remained unexplained. The carpenter Alfons Wabnitz and the businessman Fritz Schrewe were suspected of having carried them out.
- 1921: Alfons Hentschel: Lieutenant, platoon leader in the Freikorps company commanded by Captain von Mauritz, behind whom in reality the Freikorps leader Franz Pfeffer von Salomon was hiding. As an inconvenient accessory, Hentschel was shot in the back by a lieutenant Link during a patrol in a cornfield on the orders of Mauritz (i.e., Pfeffer). Hentschel is said to have suffered five shots, three of them in the back of the head. Link claimed, when he returned, that Hentschel had been shot by Poland. However, the front line was 10 kilometres (6.2 mi) away. Later, when the incident was investigated by the Opole District Court, Pfeffer von Salomon denied that he had given an order to shoot Hentschel.
- 1921: Sigulla, a man from the Oppeln district in Upper Silesia. While he was drinking at a pub in Plinkenau with members of Freikorps Roßbach, a rumour arose that he was a deserter from the Freikorps and a Polish spy. The suspicions were reported to a Freikorps Oberland lieutenant named Seppl, who detained Sigulla and led him into a nearby forest where Sigulla's body was later found with his throat cut. Seppl was arrested but released from custody after the withdrawal of the Entente troops from Upper Silesia.
- Unknown man: Murdered by the members of the Upper Silesian Self-Protection Felix Kaczmaryk and Johann Hauke from Myslowitz after jointly committed robberies and burglaries as an inconvenient accomplice.
- June 9, 1921: Karl Gareis, Bavarian member of the state parliament (USPD). Gareis was gunned down on his doorstep in Munich-Schwabing. The likely reason is that he campaigned for the dissolution of the Bavarian Residents' Militia.
- 1921: Wilhelm Walenczyk, hotelier in Krappitz, on the accusation of having supported French occupying troops in Silesia by accommodating some Frenchmen in his house, or of being a Polish spy. German security police led Hauenstein into a forest where he was shot by members of the criminal investigation department Friedrich.
- 31 October 1921: Wilhelm Hörnlein, killed in Styria by a shot to the head; allegedly because he knew too many secrets of right-wing extremist circles.
- June 7, 1922: Kurt Herrmann (* 1896/1897), cigar merchant. Herrmann was a member of the guard society "Schlesien", which took over the guarding of the property of landowners. The guard society had been founded by the former member of the Roßbach working group, Andreas Mayer, after he had fallen out with Roßbach. Hermann acted as a financier in the security company and provided the rooms in his apartment for the company's office. For reasons that are not entirely clear, Herrmann was attacked by members of the guard society at night in his sleep, drugged with chloroform and punches and then suffocated by pressing a pillow into his face. By stealing various jewellery items, a robbery-murder was to be faked. As a result, Mayer and the guard society members Otto Gebauer, Hans Spöhrer and Robert Tippel were arrested. The exact motives of the crime could not be clarified, partly there was talk of Herrmann, who was involved in arms deals, of embezzling funds of the security company, partly of Herrmann being connected to Poland, partly of the fact that one or more of the men had had an affair with his wife and that he had been eliminated as an unwelcome rival for the woman's favor, by accusing him of a betrayal. Gebauer was the first to be arrested and confessed that the murder had been committed "on higher orders" by Spöhrer and Tippel. Mayer claimed after his capture that he had only given Spöhrer and Tippel the order to give Herrmann a lesson in the form of a beating. On October 13, 1924, the four men were sentenced to five to seven years in prison by the Breslau Jury Court, not for murder, but for bodily injury resulting in death.
- February 1923: Karl Baur (1901–1923), a student, was shot dead in Munich by members of the radical right-wing Blücher League to prevent him from betraying plans for a coup.
- May 31, 1923: Walter Kadow (born 29 January 1900 in Hagenow) German elementary school teacher and member of the right-wing radical Deutschvölkische Freiheitspartei (DVFP) was arrested by members of the Parchim Fememord on 31 May 1923. He was trained as an elementary school teacher at a preparatory institution then went into the military and after his discharge became an assistant teacher in Roggenstorf. At the beginning of 1921, he joined the Roßbach working group at the Herzberg estate, a paramilitary organization that had emerged from the Freikorps Roßbach, founded by Gerhard Roßbach after the First World War – a voluntary military unit that had taken part in the civil war-like conflicts in Germany in the first post-war period. After joining the Roßbach working group, Kadow did not succeed in integrating well into it: Rather, he was extremely unpopular. According to the testimony of members of the working group in the later trial, he had acted as a lieutenant and borrowed money from comrades that he later did not repay. He is also said to have displayed a communist attitude. In 1922 or early 1923, Kadow was therefore expelled from the working group at the instigation of Martin Bormann, a leading member of the working group. As it turned out on this occasion, he had previously had an advance of 30,000 marks paid out for himself and other members of the working group without passing the money on to the other men. Bormann therefore urged Kadow to work off his debts. When Kadow returned to Parchim on May 31, 1923, after a long absence, Bormann had changed his mind: He now declared that it was pointless to let Kadow work off his debts and that it would be better to give him a "beating". As a result, some Roßbachers from the Neuhof and Herzberg estates – including the later commandant of the Auschwitz concentration camp Rudolf Höß – seized Kadow by making him drunk in a restaurant in Parchim and abducting him at night to a wooded area near Gut Neuhof, where they first severely abused him by beatings until one of the men, Emil Wiemeyer, cut the throat of the man lying on the ground, whereupon two others, Höß and Karl Zabel, shot him in the head. Kadow died on the spot and was buried in the forest by the perpetrators the next day. A few months later, seven of those involved were arrested. After the Schwerin public prosecutor's office initially considered the case to be a brawl between drinking buddies with a fatal outcome, the prosecutor at the Imperial Court in Leipzig, Ludwig Ebermayer, took over the case on the basis of the Republic Protection Act, so that jurisdiction was transferred to the State Court for the Protection of the Republic in Leipzig. Before this, six of the men, including Höß, were charged with murder. A seventh, Bormann, was charged with a lesser offense. In the trial, the defendants justified their act, among other things, by the fact that they had found a membership card of the communist youth as well as large amounts of Russian money at Kadow's house at the time, which seemed to them to be proof that Kadow had been a communist spy who had taken the embezzled funds of the working group to the Ruhr area had wanted to go "to betray Germany to the French". They claimed that the recent execution of former officer Albert Leo Schlageter, who had been sentenced to death by a French military court and summarily shot for bomb attacks on facilities of the French occupation administration in the Ruhr area, had further inflamed their hatred of Kadow as a man who had had the nerve to want to work with the "murderers" of such a "patriotic" man as Schlageter against the interests of the Reich. Rudolf Höß explained in a letter about the motivation and the course of the crime:"Now imagine our anger, Schlageter was shot 5 days ago. All the beatings that we had received through the treachery of this scoundrel [Kadow], through raids by the Communists in poorly attended meetings. We were all pretty drunk and didn't think about it at all. We drove out of Parchim on a wagon and to our home in Neuhof near Parchim. On the way he got a very pitiful beating, but he still denied it. They stopped in a meadow and confronted him again. He denies and asserts his innocence. Our anger turns into a frenzy, no one pays attention to how or with what he strikes. […] That's when the terrible thing happened. One of them got a fever and fell madly on Kadow, who was lying on the ground, and cut his throat. Another chases him two shots through the skull. The next morning he will be buried in the forest thicket." The Leipzig court found the defendants guilty: Höß was sentenced to ten years in prison on March 15, 1924 for aggravated assault and completed manslaughter. As a result of the Koch amnesty, he was released on July 14, 1928. Bormann, who had tried to remove traces after the murder, was sentenced to one year in prison for aiding and abetting. The other participants Bernhard Jurisch, Karl Zabel, Georg Pfeiffer, Emil Wiemeyer and Robert Zenz received prison sentences of between five and a half years (Jurisch) and twelve and a half years in prison (Wiemeyer) for aggravated bodily harm and completed manslaughter. Six other defendants (Bruno Fricke, Eberhard Hoffmann, Bernhard Thomsen, Bernhard Mackensen, Walter Wulbrede, Ludwig Richter) were sentenced to several months in prison for aiding and abetting.
- 4 June 1923: Erich Pannier, a member of the Black Reichswehr in Döberitz in Brandenburg, was killed on the orders of Theodor Benn by the Black Reichswehr members Stein, Schirrmann and Aschenkampf after he had "deserted" from the Black Reichswehr.
- July 1923: Walter Wilms, sergeant, was deliberately made drunk by officers after he was suspected of spying for the Communists and then shot in a car outside Rathenow in Brandenburg and weighed down with cable sleeves thrown into the Havel River.
