= Kurt Großmann =

German journalist (1897–1972)

Kurt Grossmann
- Born: Kurt Richard Großmann; 21 May 1897; Berlin-Charlottenburg, Germany
- Died: 2 March 1972; St. Petersburg, Florida, US
- Occupations: Human rights activist Journalist
- Spouse: Elsa Mecklenburg (1898-1982)
- Children: Walter Grossmann (Gilbert)
- Parent(s): Hermann Großmann; Rahel Freundlich

Kurt Großmann (21 May 1897 – 2 March 1972) began his career as a German journalist. He emigrated from Germany in the Hitler years, living his final decades in Queens, New York. Although sources sometimes describe him as an American journalist, his preferred working language remained German. West German newspapers for which he reported from New York during the 1950s and the 1960s included the Rheinischer Merkur and Vorwärts.

His experiences as a soldier during the First World War turned Großmann into a committed pacifist. He served as General Secretary of the German League for Human Rights between 1926 and 1933.

== Biography ==
=== Provenance and early years ===
Kurt Richard Großmann was born in Berlin-Charlottenburg, the second child of the businessman Hermann Grossmann and his wife Rahel (born Rahel Freundlich). Both parents were originally from East Prussia and had, like thousands of others during the closing decades of the nineteenth century, moved from the economically depressed countryside to the rapidly expanding German capital in pursuit of better financial security. Fifteen years older than his wife, and 48 by the time his son was born, Hermann Großmann died following a heart attack in 1909, leaving Kurt and his elder sister Margaret to be bought up by their mother as a single parent. Margaret later recalled that as a boy Kurt Großmann became an enthusiastic junior member of the city's Animal Welfare Association. He used to visit the Berlin carriage stands, which were the taxi ranks of the time, and distribute leaflets to the coachmen urging that they should treat their animals with consideration.

=== School, apprenticeship and war ===
Großmann attended junior school locally and moved on to the nearby "Leibniz-Oberschule" (secondary school) in Charlottenburg. His academic progress was, in the context of his subsequent career, notably undistinguished, and in September 1913 he left the school "to get private lessons". In 1914 he embarked on a commercial apprenticeship with "Handelshaus Kosterlitz", an import-export business in the colonial goods sector. war broke out in 1914. Two years later, now aged nineteen, and seized by the spirit of those times, he volunteered for military service, joining the imperial army in March 1916. For two and a half years he saw active service on both the Eastern and Western Fronts. In September 1918, he was captured and detained by the British army. His commercial apprenticeship had included English language lessons, and in the prisoner of war camp in which he was held he was set to work as a simultaneous translator. His internment lasted approximately a year.

=== Pacifist ===
In September 1919 he returned to his job with Kosterlitz. Early in 1920 he switched to the Darmstädter und Nationalbank, employed in the bank's Berlin branch. In his spare time he worked voluntarily for a prisoner of war organisation. Kurt Großmann had emerged from the British PoW camp as a committed pacifist and, in the face of significant opposition from populist elements, he took a lead in the international honouring of war victims. In Berlin, on Totensonntag ('Sunday of the Dead'), in 1921 he organised a Feier zu Ehren der Toten des Weltkrieges ('Celebration of the World War dead'). Reactions were mixed, but when the event was repeated in 1922 participants included the president of the Reichstag (parliament), Paul Löbe. Großmann's involvement with the German League for Human Rights dates back to this period. A few years later, on 11 November 1928, Großmann teamed up with Stephan Fingal to stage the only formal commemoration in Germany of the 1918 Armistice of the Weimar period.

=== Human rights ===
In 1926 Großmann was elected General Secretary of the German League for Human Rights. Under his guidance the league campaigned against courtroom injustices. One particularly high-profile case in which Großmann and the league involved themselves was that of the illiterate Polish (or Russian: sources differ) labourer, Josef Jakubowski who was found guilty of murder, sentenced and executed in 1925. The trial was widely regarded as flawed, and there was a sense that Jakubowski's status as an illiterate foreigner might have played a part in his wrongful conviction and sentencing. The campaign succeeded in obtaining a (posthumous) "partial rehabilitation" for Jakubowski after the "real murderers" had been caught and sentenced in 1929. However, the various officials responsible for the original mistrial and for the gratuitous delays in investigating it went unpunished. Another case in which Großmann engaged prominently involved Walter Bullerjahn who was set-up by a commercial rival and then, in 1925, found guilty of treason and sentenced to a fifteen-year jail term. Bullerjahn's release was reported in 1932.

=== Régime change and exile ===
At the start of 1933 the National Socialists took power and lost no time in transforming Germany into a post-democratic one-party dictatorship. Großmann was one of the organisers of Das Freie Wort, a large "antifascist protest meeting" held at Berlin's Kroll Opera House on 19 February 1933 (which was broken up by police after two hours). The targets of the protest were a number of major human rights threats and violations, including restrictions on freedom to assemble and on press freedom, which had been imposed during the three weeks since the Hitler government had taken power. A few days later he was telephoned by a friend. Robert Kempner informed Großmann that he was about to be arrested. A few days later Kempner, deemed politically unreliable, was suspended from his position as a senior lawyer with the Prussian police service. Pausing only for long enough to destroy thousands of letters, notes and manuscripts that might have been of interest to the authorities, on 28 February 1933 Kurt Grossman took a trip to Prague. Keen to avoid drawing attention to himself at the border, Großmann travelled alone, with 200 marks and a small suitcase. No one was there to meet him at 20:20 when he arrived from Berlin at Prague's Masaryk station. None of his friends in Prague was expecting him. The previous evening Kurt and Elsa Großmann had been guests at a party in Berlin held by the Social Democrats to mark the fiftieth anniversary of the death of Karl Marx. On his arrival he took a taxi to the home of a friend whom he knew through the Human Rights league, which became his first stop along the route of his long "escape from the Hitler terror". Elsa and the couple's son Walter joined him in Prague on 5 March 1933. Back in Germany, during the next few weeks thousands of high-profile Jews and anti-Nazis were arrested. Subsequently discovered German government records show that had he not escaped when he did, Kurt Großmann would have been among the first of them.

On 25 August 1933 the German government published a list of Germans to be deprived of their citizenship. In the end there would be 359 such lists. The first was relatively short, containing just 33 names. Almost half of those listed were of Jewish provenance. Kurt Großmann was on the list, both on account of his Jewish provenance and because the authorities had identified him (correctly) as an enemy of National Socialism.

In Prague he set up the Demokratische Flüchtlingsfürsorge ('Democratic refugees welfare organisation'), which involved tapping into his skill at dealing with the authorities and a talent for finding sources of funds to provide support for many German exiles in the Czech capital. He moved on to Paris in 1938. After the Munich Agreement in September of that year he made efforts, from Paris, to help extract endangered German anti-fascist exiles out of Czechoslovakia.

=== New York ===
Kurt Grossmann arrived in New York in 1939, the year that war broke out. In New York he worked for the World Jewish Congress which had been intensifying its practical efforts on behalf of persecuted Jewish refugees from Nazi Germany since the Évian Conference which had been convened in July 1938 at the instigation of the United States president. A formidable organiser and prodigious author of memoranda, letter, reports and articles for publication, he took a lead in organising and contributing to material support for refugees. Subsequently he also actively engaged with the Jewish Agency and, after the war was over, the Jewish Claims Conference. Having arrived as a stateless refugee, during the 1940s Grossmann acquired US citizenship.

After 1945 Grossmann took as his principal mission the forging of German-Jewish reconciliation. Already during—and in some cases before—the war he had been a frequent contributor to publications that were or had become "emigrant newspapers" such as Aufbau, Neue Weltbühne, Neu Vorwärts, Pariser Tageblatt and Neue Tage-Buch.

During the postwar period Grossmann was briefly employed as US correspondent for the SPD newspaper Vorwärts, and at various stages wrote for all West Germany's important left-liberal newspapers. He also worked for the (Swiss) Berner Tagwacht and the (Israeli) Jedioth Chadashoth. Over more than twenty years he published thousands of articles and a large number of books. One of his best known works, appearing in 1957, was Die unbesungenen Helden: Menschen in Deutschlands dunklen Tagen (The Unsung Heroes: People in Germany's Dark Days) which describes individual acts of resistance in opposition to National Socialist persecution. This book provided the impetus for a 1960 initiative by the Berlin Senator Joachim Lipschitz to commemorate, for the first time, the "antifascist" activities undertaken by a wide number of citizens never individually identified.

In 1972 Kurt Grossmann was nominated as a candidate for receipt of the Carl von Ossietzky Medal to be awarded by the Berlin branch of the International League for Human Rights. Unfortunately he died unexpectedly before the award could be bestowed.

== Selected works ==
- Ossietzky: Ein deutscher Patriot. Kindler, München 1963. Mit einer Bibliographie C. v. Ossietzkys
- Die Emigration – Die Geschichte der Hitlerflüchtlinge 1933-1945. 408 S., EVA, Frankfurt am Main 1969
- Die Ehrenschuld. Kurzgeschichte d. Wiedergutmachung. Ullstein, Frankfurt 1967
- Die unbesungenen Helden; Menschen in Deutschlands dunklen Tagen. 388 S., Arani Verlag, Berlin 1957
- The Jewish refugee. Zusammen mit Arieh Tartakower. Institute of Jewish Affairs of the American Jewish Congress and World Jewish Congress, New York 1944
- Peace and the German problem. New Europe, New York 1943. Gesamttitel: World reconstruction pamphlet series; 3
- Fünf Jahre!: Flucht, Not u. Rettung. produced by the Demokratischen Flüchtlingsfürsorge. Verlag Demokrat. Flüchtlingsfürsorge, Prag 1938. published anonymously
- Carl von Ossietzky (under the pseudonym „Felix Burger“ with Kurt Singer). 143 S., Europa Verlag, Zürich 1937
- Menschen auf der Flucht: drei Jahre Fürsorgearbeit für die deutschen Flüchtlinge. Hrsg. von d. Demokratischen Flüchtlingsfürsorge. Verlag der Demokratischen Flüchtlingsfürsorge, Prag 1936. Anonym erschienen
- Der gelbe Fleck: ein Bericht vom Frühjahr 1933. Unter dem Pseudonym Hermann Walter. Verlag Tschechische Liga Gegen d. Antisemitismus, Prag, 1933
- Juden in brauner Hölle: Augenzeugen berichten aus SA-Kasernen u. Konzentrationslagern. under the pseudonym Felix Burger, Umschlagbild von John Heartfield. Verlag Die Abwehr, Prag 1933
- 13 Jahre „republikanische“ Justiz. Voco-Verlag, Berlin 1932. Gesamttitel: Republikanische Bibliothek; vol. 1
