= Die Weltbühne =

German weekly magazine

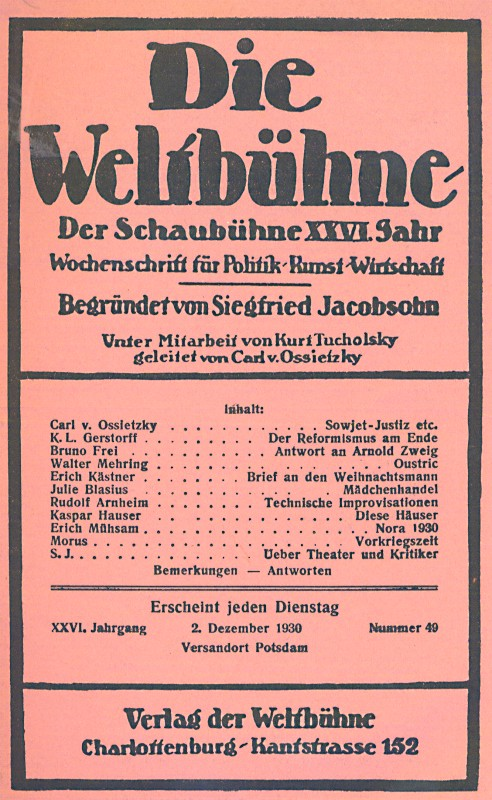
Cover page of the Weltbühne from February 2, 1930

Die Weltbühne (German pronunciation: [diː ˈvɛltˌbyːnə], ‘The World Stage’) was a German weekly magazine for politics, art and the economy. It was founded in Berlin in 1905 as Die Schaubühne ("The Theater") by Siegfried Jacobsohn and was originally a theater magazine only. In 1913 it began covering economic and political topics and for the next two decades was one of the leading periodicals of Germany’s political left. It was renamed to Die Weltbühne on 4 April 1918. After Jacobsohn's death in December 1926, leadership of the magazine passed to Kurt Tucholsky, who turned it over to Carl von Ossietzky in May of 1927. The Nazi Party banned the publication shortly after it came to power, and the magazine's last issue appeared on 7 March 1933. It continued from exile as Die neue Weltbühne ("The New World Stage") until 1939. After the end of World War II, it appeared again under its original name in East Berlin, where it survived until 1993. The magazines Ossietzky (since 1997) and Das Blättchen ("The Leaflet," 1998) have followed in the tradition of their famous role model.

Appearing in the form of a small red booklet, the Weltbühne was considered the forum for the radical-democratic bourgeois left during the Weimar Republic. About 2,500 authors wrote for the paper between 1905 and 1933. Contributors included many prominent writers and journalists in addition to Jacobsohn, Tucholsky and Ossietzky.

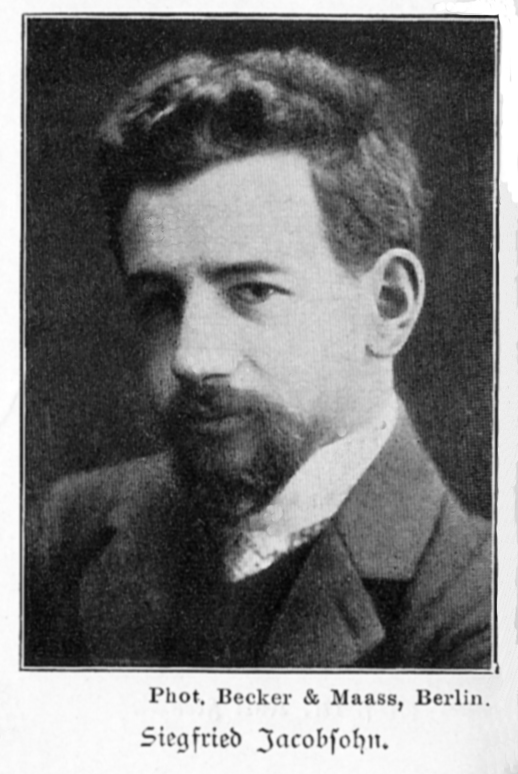
Siegfried Jacobsohn

Even at its high point, the Weltbühne had a relatively low circulation of about 15,000 copies. It nevertheless made a name for itself in the journalistic world, including through its exposure of the Feme murders by the Black Reichswehr paramilitary groups as well as reports about the secret rearmament of the Reichswehr, which later led to the so-called Weltbühne Trial.

== Origin and development of the Schaubühne ==
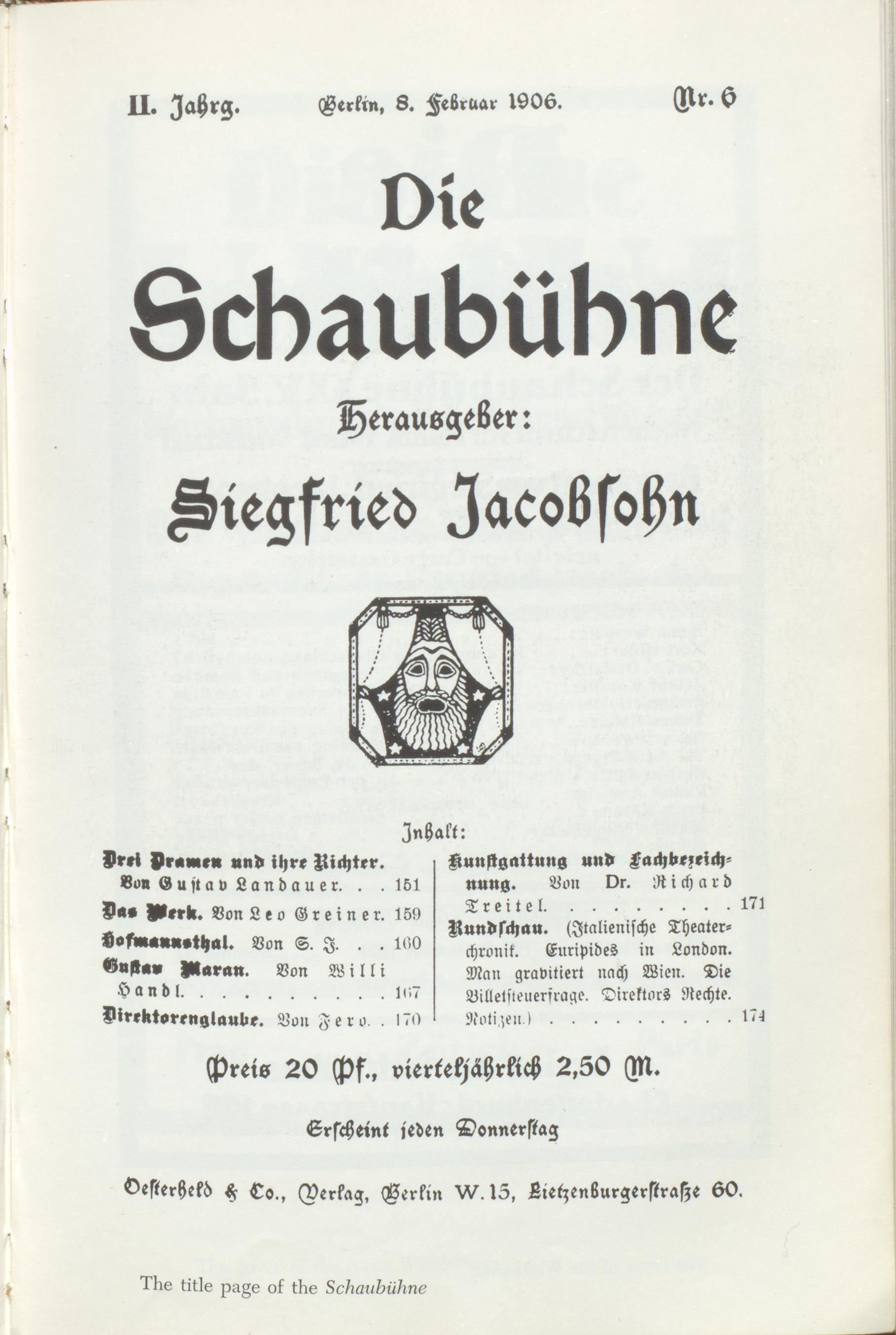
Die Schaubühne (1906)

The foundation of Die Schaubühne was an indirect result of plagiarism involving Siegfried Jacobsohn, the 23-year-old theater critic for the Welt am Montag ("World on Monday"). On 12 November 1904, the Berliner Tageblatt reported parallels between reviews written by Jacobsohn and Alfred Gold. Due to the ensuing public outrage, the Welt am Montag decided to dismiss Jacobsohn, whose pugnaciousness had already made him disliked by some in the media and theater. Having failed professionally for the time being, Jacobsohn set out on a journey through Europe that lasted several months. On his return he decided to launch his own theater magazine.

=== Theater phase (1905–1913) ===
The journal went through several phases of development during its existence from 1905 to 1933. Until 1913 its focus was on "all the interests of the theater", as stated in the newspaper's subtitle. In the opening article of its first issue, titled Zum Geleit ("In Preface"), Jacobsohn wrote of his conviction that "the character of a nation and a specific time is expressed more vividly in drama than in any other form of literature".

The motto displayed on the cover of the first four issues was a quote from Friedrich Schiller's essay Die Schaubühne als moralische Anstalt betrachtet ("The Theater Viewed as a Moral Institution"): “As surely as visual representation has a more powerful effect than lifeless letters and cold narrations, just as surely does the theater have a deeper and longer lasting effect than morals and laws.” This was an indication of how Jacobsohn wanted his enterprise to be understood: as enlightenment in the spirit of classicism. The great importance attached to artistic debates at that time was due in part to the fact that the arts were less subject to repression in the German Empire under Emperor Wilhelm II than politics and journalism.

Among the most important contributors during the early phase of the Schaubühne were the theater critics Julius Bab, Willi Handl, and Alfred Polgar. In subsequent years writers such as Lion Feuchtwanger, Robert Walser and Harry Kahn, as well as the theater critic Herbert Ihering, also joined the enterprise. In November 1908 after only 15 issues, Feuchtwanger's magazine Der Spiegel (‘The Mirror’) merged with the Schaubühne.

As a theater critic, Jacobsohn was the antithesis of the "culture pope" Alfred Kerr. Unlike Kerr he was a resolute critic of naturalism and held Max Reinhardt's achievements as a theater director and manager in far higher esteem than those of Otto Brahm. Jacobsohn, however, disapproved of Reinhardt's turn to mass theater in circus arenas, which began in 1910 and eventually led to the construction of the Großes Schauspielhaus ("Great Theater") in Berlin.

=== Opening to politics (1913–1918) ===
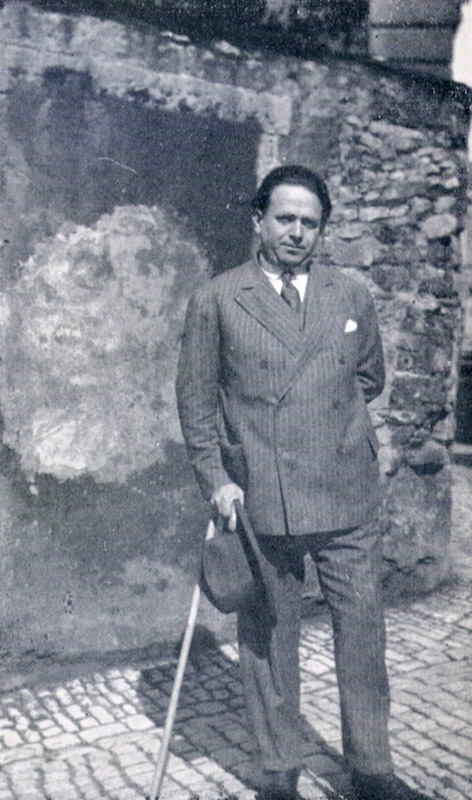
Kurt Tucholsky in Paris, 1928

On 9 January 1913 the first article by the 23-year-old law student Kurt Tucholsky appeared in the Schaubühne. During his first year of collaboration with Jacobsohn, Tucholsky became his most important associate.

In order to keep the paper from appearing too "Tucholsky-heavy", he adopted three pseudonyms in 1913 which he retained until the end of his publishing career: Ignaz Wrobel, Theobald Tiger and Peter Panter ("panther"). Under the influence of Tucholsky's collaboration, the character of the Schaubühne changed rapidly. In March 1913 the first "Answers" appeared, a column in which the magazine commented on real or fictitious letters to the editor. More important, however, was Jacobsohn's decision to open his paper to topics from politics and business. On 25 September business lawyer Martin Friedlaender reported under the pseudonym 'Vindex' on monopoly structures in the American tobacco industry. Jacobsohn commented in a fabricated "Answer": "If for nine years the theater and only the theater has been considered here, I have not forfeited the right to consider other things and to have them considered. To plow a field apart from all others has its charms, its advantages, but also its dangers.”

During World War I Jacobsohn managed to have his magazine published regularly despite the difficult conditions. From August 1914 he opened every issue with a political editorial advocating a "patriotic" point of view. In November 1915, under the pseudonym "Cunctator" (Procrastinator), journalist Robert Breuer launched a series of articles critical of the policies of the German government and the political state of the Reich. The series culminated on 23 December with an article entitled “The Crisis of Capitalism”, which concluded with the assessment: "Only the international proletariat can overcome the crisis of capitalism dressed up in national garb."

The Schaubühne was banned because of the article, but Jacobsohn was able to ensure the continued appearance of the paper by agreeing to pre-censorship. Transformed into ‘Germanicus’, Breuer returned to the paper in January 1916 as a commentator and, in spite of his pseudonym, led a permanent fight against the annexation demands of the Pan-German League. After 1916 Jacobsohn, who had made a passionate pacifist commitment in 1915 after the death of his youngest brother at the front, regularly printed advertisements for the subscription of war bonds. It is still not clear whether these advertisements were paid and thus possibly contributed materially to ensuring the magazine's survival. The overall tone of the magazine, which was by no means pacifist and could at best be described as politically changeable, later earned Jacobsohn criticism from among others the journalists Franz Pfemfert and Karl Kraus.

On 4 April 1918 Jacobsohn finally took account of the Schaubühne’s change from a purely theatrical journal to a "journal of politics, art, and economics" and renamed it the Weltbühne.

=== Revolution and republic (1918–1926) ===
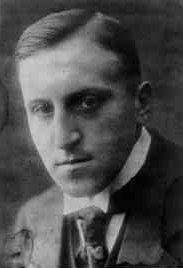
Carl von Ossietzky

After the initial successes of the German spring offensive in 1918, Jacobsohn's editorialist Robert Breuer moved away from his hitherto anti-annexation position and abandoned the paper's previous line in other areas as well. The differences between Breuer, a supporter of the Majority Social Democratic Party, and Jacobsohn, who was moving more and more toward the position of the more radical Independent Social Democratic Party, eventually led to the departure of ‘Germanicus’. During the German Revolution of 1918–1919, the Weltbühne did not allow itself to be committed to a party course. From March 1919 to October 1920, the Social Democrat Heinrich Ströbel wrote the political editorials.

On 21 November 1918 Jacobsohn published the program of the Council of Intellectual Workers to which he briefly belonged but which he left because he did not want to have his editorial time taken up by a "debating club". Soon after that the Weltbühne began examining the cooperation between social democracy and the old army, as well as the inadequate purge of monarchist and anti-republican officials from the judiciary and administration.

In March 1919 Tucholsky defended himself in the programmatic text "We the Negatives" against accusation that he did not view the new republic positively enough: "We cannot say yes to a people which, even today, is in a condition which, had the war by chance ended favorably, would have led us to fear the worst. We cannot say yes to a country obsessed with collectivity, and to which the corporation stands far above the individual.”

In the following years the Weltbühne took a strictly pacifist and anti-militarist course, calling for a harsh reaction by the Republic to the numerous political assassinations and even during the occupation of the Ruhr urging fulfillment of the peace terms laid down in the Treaty of Versailles.

For this reason the paper also resolutely advocated reconciliation with the opponents of the war. The Weltbühne did a special service by drawing attention to the Feme murders within the Black Reichswehr. Although Jacobsohn knew that he was exposing himself to great personal danger, he began on 18 August 1925 to publish manuscripts about the murders provided by the former Freikorps member Carl Mertens.

Leading the way in the further development of the magazine was the commitment of the political journalist Carl von Ossietzky, who was employed by Jacobsohn in April 1926 as editor and lead editorialist. With Jacobsohn's sudden death on 3 December 1926, the continued existence of the Weltbühne, which at the time had a circulation of around 12,500, came in doubt.

=== Fight against National Socialism (1927–1933) ===
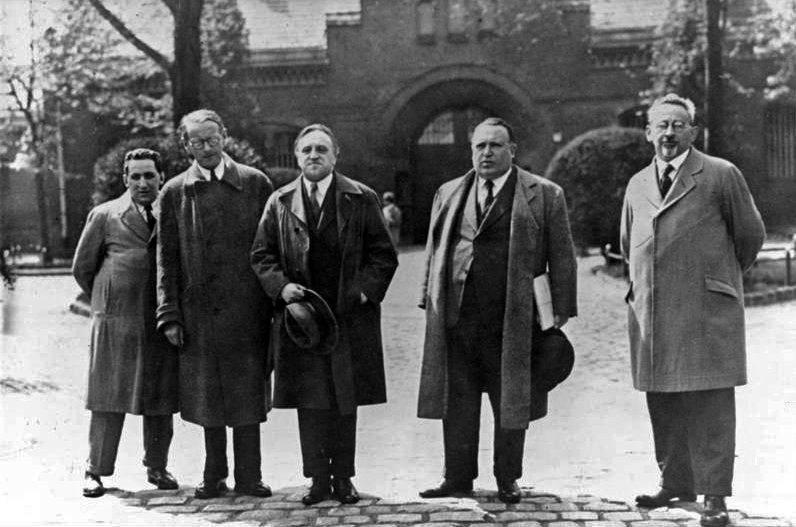
In front of the prison in Berlin-Tegel. From left to right: Kurt Großmann, Rudolf Olden (both German League for Human Rights), Carl von Ossietzky, Apfel (lawyer), Rosenfeld

After the death of his mentor Jacobsohn, Tucholsky gave up his position as correspondent in Paris, returned to Berlin and became – as he derisively called it – "editor-publisher-in-chief" of the Weltbühne. Jacobsohn's widow Edith took over management of the publishing house in 1927. It soon became apparent that Tucholsky was not comfortable with his position as editor. Ossietzky therefore took over the post in May 1927 and was officially named publisher in October 1927, "with the collaboration of Kurt Tucholsky", as the title page read until 1933. Although von Ossietzky was a completely different kind of editor than Jacobsohn, the fundamental nature of the journal was maintained. From Tucholsky's letters to his wife Mary Gerold, however, it is clear that in 1927 and 1928 he was anything but satisfied with the working methods of his successor. It was only in later years that the two became closer both personally and in their ideas about the content of the paper. In May 1932 Tucholsky finally admitted that Ossietzky had given the paper a "tremendous boost".

This boost was reflected in the circulation, which reached its maximum of 15,000 copies in the early 1930s. The importance of the Weltbühne is shown by the readers' circles that formed in numerous German cities and even in South America. The almost continuous legal disputes that the Weltbühne had with the Ministry of the Reichswehr because of its anti-militarism reporting also attracted attention beyond its circle of readers. The climax of these conflicts was the so-called Weltbühne trial, as a result of which von Ossietzky and the journalist Walter Kreiser were sentenced to 18 months in prison for espionage.

Toward the end of the Weimar Republic, the paper's full concentration was on the fight against the "journey to the Third Reich" (Tucholsky), although cultural life was not completely sidelined. By the beginning of 1932, Tucholsky had resigned and was only sporadically publishing his own works. In May 1932, Hellmut von Gerlach temporarily took over as editor, since Ossietzky had to serve out his prison sentence. During this time the journalist Walther Karsch acted as so-called ‘sitting editor’, i.e. he was the sole person liable in legal disputes and lawsuits, thus protecting the journal’s editors. In the summer Ossietzky, who was still in prison, was also charged on account of Tucholsky’s "soldiers are murderers" statement. A court acquitted him, and he was released from prison at Christmas 1932 under an amnesty.

With the seizure of power by the Nazi Party on 30 January 1933, it was to be foreseen that the banning of the Weltbühne would follow. On the night of the Reichstag fire of 27–28 February 1933, Ossietzky and other staff members were arrested. After Hellmut von Gerlach fled, Walther Karsch, later co-founder of the Berlin Tagesspiegel (‘Berlin Daily Mirror’), took over as editor-in-chief of the Weltbühne. The issue planned for March 14 was printed but could not be delivered. The last issue of the Weltbühne thus appeared on 7 March 1933 (No. 10) and ended with the defiant assurance: "For the spirit shall prevail.”

== Successor journals ==
=== The volatile exile years: 1933–1939 ===
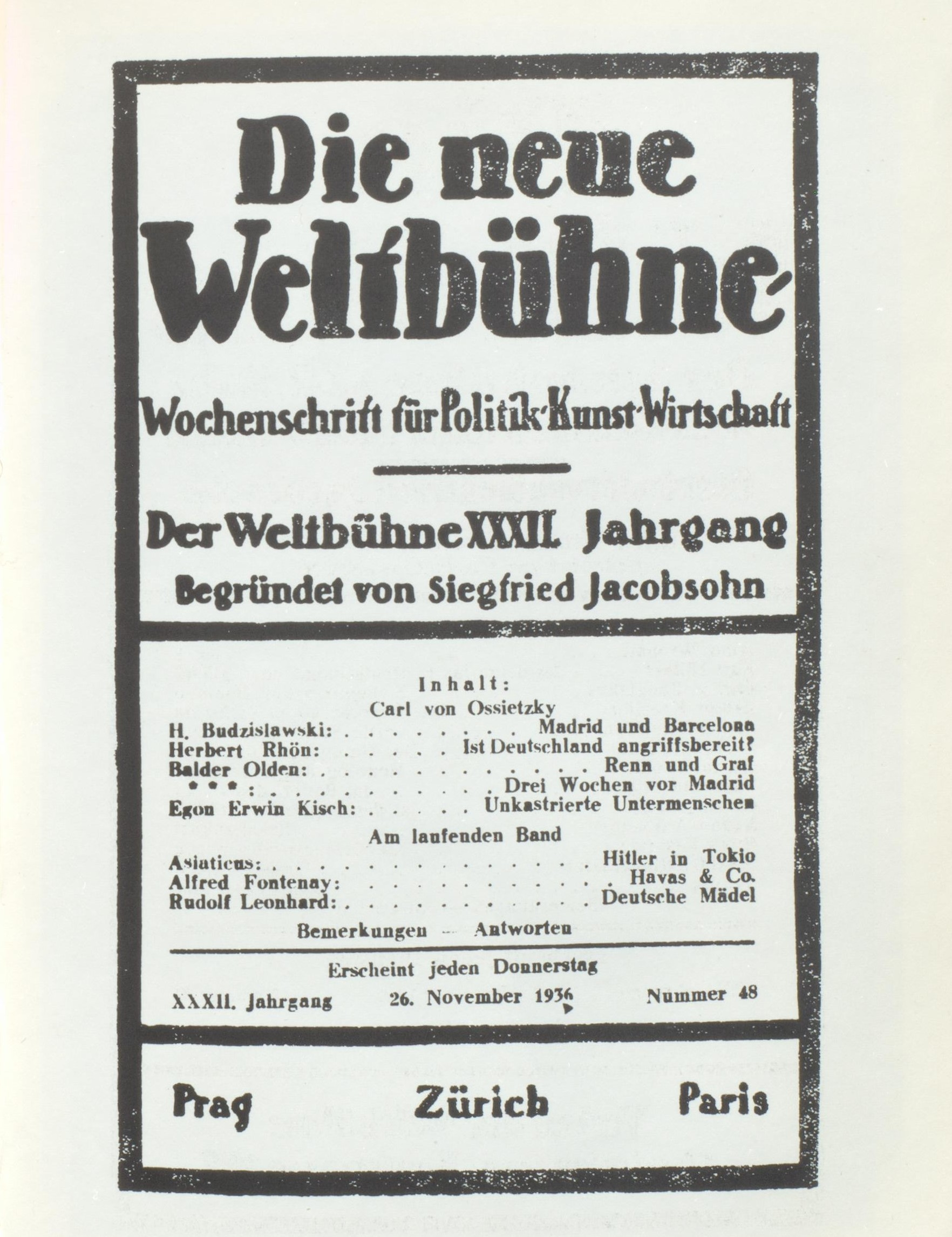
Die neue Weltbühne (1936)

The publisher of the Weltbühne was prepared for the ban on the journal. On 29 September 1932, an offshoot of the journal appeared in Vienna, the Wiener Weltbühne (‘Viennese World Stage’). Various Berlin emigrants were already writing for issues 11–13 of 1933. The journalist Willi Schlamm, a student of Karl Kraus and Leon Trotsky, served as the director of the Vienna branch. The editorial contract between Schlamm and Edith Jacobsohn provided that Carl von Ossietzky take over the editorship of the exile journal in the event of his emigration. But that did not happen.

Edith Jacobsohn and her son Peter managed to escape to Switzerland together. From there she tried to continue to exercise influence on the journal, which had been forced to move its editorial headquarters to Prague after the Austrian Parliament was deprived of power by Chancellor Engelbert Dollfuß. Since the original Berlin paper had in the meantime been banned, the journal changed its name to Die neue Weltbühne (‘The New World Stage’). Between 6 April 1933 (No. 14) and 31 August 1939 (No. 35), nearly 4,000 articles appeared. Willi Schlamm became the editorial director and did his job well. Tucholsky praised him especially in a letter to Heinz Pol, saying that he thought Schlamm's articles were "first-rate".

In 1934 the leadership of the paper was taken out of Schlamm’s hands. He spoke of "extortion and a targeted coup by the communists”. According to historian Alexander Gallus, the events surrounding the change of editorship from Schlamm to Hermann Budzislawski are disputed. Gallus considers Schlamm's supposition plausible because such takeovers were not uncommon under Stalin's form of communism and because Schlamm had made himself unpopular by harshly criticizing both the Communists and the Social Democrats for their role in the Nazi seizure of power. Under the influence of Budzislawski, an economic journalist close to the communists who had been an occasional contributor to the Weltbühne in Berlin, Edith Jacobsohn made a break with Schlamm. In March 1934 Budzislawski took over the editorial office in Prague. Even though he immediately changed the magazine’s political stance, he was not able to increase circulation significantly. This was in part due to the fact that when Austria and soon after the Saar region became part of Germany, important markets for the exile magazine were lost. As a result, Edith Jacobsohn was forced to sell the publishing house and title rights in June 1934.

The buyers were the physicist Albrecht Seidler-Stein (60 percent of the shares), the lawyer Hans Nathan-Ludwig (31 percent) and the former Weltbühne employee Heinz Pol (nine percent). In July 1935 Nathan-Ludwig sold his shares to Budzislawski's friend Helene Reichenbach, daughter of a Chinese diplomat and businessman. Pol also relinquished his shares in November 1935, so that Seidler-Stein owned two-thirds of the shares and Reichenbach one-third. Since Seidler-Stein tried to replace Budzislawski with another editor, Budzislawski eventually forced him out of the publishing house. Although Budzislawski had no financial reserves, Reichenbach, who lived in Moscow, agreed to a contract in August 1936 that assured both of them equal ownership of the publishing house. Under these conditions, the magazine was able to survive for three more years. In June 1938 the editorial staff moved from Prague to Paris, since the New Weltbühne had already been confiscated several times in Czechoslovakia because of articles critical of Germany. In France as well the authorities banned the paper, and it appeared for the last time on 31 August 1939.

Budzislawski has often been accused of having taken over the Neue Weltbühne merely as a communist agent in order to be able to continue running it in the interests of the Communist Party of Germany and the Communist International. More recent research, based on an evaluation of the editorial archive, assumes that Budzislawski wanted to take over the leadership of the Neue Weltbühne for reasons of personal reputation and as a staunch opponent of Hitler. It must nevertheless be noted that under his editorship, German communists such as Walter Ulbricht and Franz Dahlem who had emigrated to Moscow found a forum in the paper. Moreover, Budzislawski avoided reporting on Stalin's great purge. In 1937 Kurt Hiller, a staff member of the Weltbühne since 1915, appealed in vain to Budzislawski to restore the journal's characteristic balance and liberality.

== Party newspaper after the war: 1946–1993 ==
In 1946 the Weltbühne was re-founded by Maud von Ossietzky and Hans Leonhard and published by the Weltbühne Publishers in East Berlin. From the U.S. both Peter Jacobsohn and Budzislawski raised objections to the re-founding.

In the years after the war, the magazine found many customers in the Western occupation zones. In the 1950s and 1960s, the Weltbühne was seen as a bridge to intellectual circles in the West, as well as a way to influence those circles. An application for the reissue of a license certificate in 1962 stated: "It should be particularly emphasized that among these matters, one of the tasks that was considered and accepted was the influencing of intellectual circles at home and abroad, especially in West Germany. The signer of this application received a directive to this effect from the Central Committee of the Socialist Unity Party of Germany soon after the currency union."

In cases of doubt, the editors decided in favor of current political requirements and against the magazine’s tradition, as can be seen from an internal statement from the mid-1950s: "In the past – before 1933 – the Weltbühne, especially under the leadership of Carl von Ossietzky and Kurt Tucholsky, had unfortunately embraced pacifist trends unconditionally. Since our weekly magazine is called the Weltbühne and also carries the name of Carl von Ossietzky, it is important to make the aura that these names carry and the tradition of the Weltbühne as useful as possible to the progressive aspirations of today […] without slipping into unconditional pacifism. The 1954 Weltbühne supports the policies of the German Democratic Republic, which means that it naturally and consistently represents the aspirations of the Socialist Unity Party of Germany, without becoming outwardly recognizable as a party organ."

"If the Weltbühne always came across as somewhat more intellectual than other East German magazines, it was still basically faithful to the party line," is Petra Kabus' summary. Its circulation of 170,000 copies was, however, more than ten times that of the original Weltbühne.

From 1967 to 1971, Hermann Budzislawski again served as publisher and editor-in-chief of the Weltbühne. From December 1989 until the paper's discontinuation in July 1993, Helmut Reinhardt took over the two roles. The magazine had to be discontinued in part because Peter Jacobsohn claimed the rights to the magazine’s title following German reunification. Jacobsohn lost an initial lawsuit before the state court at Frankfurt am Main. In the subsequent appeal proceedings before the regional high court at Frankfurt, the publisher's interim owner, Bernd F. Lunkewitz, attempted to reach an out-of-court settlement with Jacobsohn. When the attempt failed, he discontinued the highly loss-making magazine on 6 July 1993. His reasoning: "I do not want to quarrel with Mr. Peter Jacobsohn, heir to the founder of the publishing house. He was racially persecuted in Germany, expropriated and had to emigrate. In order to save the company, I offered to buy it from him for 1 DM. He refused. I then proposed a settlement that was intended to reconcile the morally sound resolution of Mr. Jacobsohn's claims with the interests of the magazine's readers and employees. (...) He decided not to take the publishing house, only the title rights; therefore the magazine can no longer be published."

As an advance concession for the settlement, the Weltbühne publishing house had fully acknowledged Jacobsohn's claims. The acknowledgment was not withdrawn, and publisher Helmut Reinhardt had assumed until the very end that the case before the regional high court would be won. The editors of the paper were therefore completely surprised by Lunkewitz's unilateral action and added their own statement to his declaration: "The cast of the Weltbühne stands stunned at the front of the stage, takes off its hat, bows to its loyal audience and lets it be known: We can think of nothing more to say about this dirty trick!"

Because of the acknowledgement of the plaintiff’s claim, it was never legally clarified whether the title rights had been granted to Jacobsohn's heirs. Although Jacobsohn secured the title rights in the interim, they were never subsequently used.

In August 1993 Lunkewitz finally sold the publishing house and its subscriber list to Peter Großhaus, who at the time also published the former Free German Youth newspaper Junge Welt. In December 1993 the publishing house changed hands once again and was renamed Webe Publishers and Holding Company. Three years later, in November 1996, Titanic publisher Erik Weihönig bought the publishing house. Webe was deleted from the commercial register on 29 November 2001.

== Reception and impact ==
The fact that the Weltbühne was able to have such a substantial impact despite its small circulation can likely be explained only through the person of Siegfried Jacobsohn. Over a period of two decades he succeeded in bringing important representatives of the intellectual left to his paper and ensuring a consistently high quality of writing. "The man was the most ideal editor our generation has seen," wrote Tucholsky after Jacobsohn's unexpected death in December 1926. Unlike in Karl Kraus's Fackel (‘Torch’) and Maximilian Harden's Zukunft (‘Future’), the editor's writing even at the beginning did not dominate the Weltbühne. Jacobsohn always saw himself as the "director of a printed stage", as he wrote in a letter in May 1905.

The low circulation does not contradict the Weltbühne's special position but can rather serve to explain it. In contrast to larger newspapers, the Weltbühne did not have to take into account the interests of a publishing house, a party or advertisers. Jacobsohn also paid little heed to the demands of his readers. "They have only one right: not to read my paper" was the credo of his mentor that Tucholsky often quoted. Characteristic of this was an answer Jacobsohn gave to a reader toward the end of the First World War: "You complain about the tone of my paper? I have a sure remedy for you: rid me of your readership, and that as quickly as possible. (...) But if this filthy mess [press censorship] should ever come to an end, and if I should live to see it, then a tone will be whistled here, a little tone that will take your hearing and sight away." -- “Answers” in the Weltbühne, 21 October 1918, p. 424.

Such independence was also a reason why, despite the not exactly opulent fees, an author like Tucholsky kept returning to the Weltbühne and published works there that he could not get printed in middle-class papers like the Vossische Zeitung or the Berliner Tageblatt. One result of the radicalism was the accusations that the paper had to deal with at the beginning of 1919. Tucholsky summarized them as follows: "We staff members of the Weltbühne are accused of saying no to everything and of not being positive enough. We do nothing but reject and criticize and even foul our own German nest. And we fight – and this they say is the worst – hatred with hatred, violence with violence, fist with fist." -- Kurt Tucholsky: “Wir Negativen” [We the Negatives], in: Die Weltbühne, 13 March 1919, p. 279.

The background to the criticism was probably the fact that from the very beginning of the Weimar Republic, the Weltbühne did not allow itself to be pinned down to the particular political position of any party and did not see its ideas of a democratic and social Germany realized by any of them. Until the end of the Weimar Republic, the paper accused the Social Democratic Party (SPD) in particular of having betrayed the ideals of the November Revolution and of not having broken vigorously enough with the traditions of the German Empire.

The radicalism and openness of the Weltbühne's positions was also a reason why they were watched very attentively within journalism and politics. The paper’s class of readers was the cause of a ‘multiplier effect’ that ensured that the Weltbühne’s positions were disseminated in other papers, even if they were often abbreviated and distorted. "The Weltbühne has always had two significant opposing poles: the parties and the big print media companies," Tucholsky wrote in "Twenty-Five Years”.

Characteristic of the Weltbühne's reception and impact, as well as of the tone and content of the debates at the time, is the following ‘Answers’ column that quotes a Social Democratic paper's criticism of the Weltbühne: Volksblatt für Halle ['Halle People’s Paper']: "You are annoyed with us and now write: 'In the Weltbühne, which calls itself a Weekly Journal for Politics, Art, and Economics, a certain Carl von Ossietzky polemicizes against the Kiel party congress [of the SPD]. Although he is forced to make the statement that the party is on unshakable ground, in revenge he calls it unintellectual. Even if we do not consider as politics the individualistic-anarchistic coffeehouse literacy that makes itself at home in the magazine, it is nevertheless important to occasionally draw attention to the imputations against everyone and everything that as a result of an astonishing intellectual licentiousness also make themselves at home there, since the magazine is strangely enough also read here and there in union circles. The democratic member of the Reichstag Erkelenz recently characterized the Weltbühne very accurately when he wrote: "Whatever men may rule in Germany at any given time, after the shortest possible interval they will all, without distinction of party, be made so worm-eaten by the Weltbühne that no dog will take a piece of bread from them." Let this be the introduction to the following article." The article that follows begins: The Social Democrats as the greatest intellectual current of the present time ... One can make nothing of such stuff." -- “Answers,” in the Weltbühne, 7 June 1927, p. 920.

In spite of the constant criticism of the SPD, it was always clear to the Weltbühne that the true enemies of the Republic were to be found on the other side of the political spectrum. A poem by Tucholsky at the end of 1919 stated: "Now I stand up. I am in the know: / After that tiny, great time / Let this be the judgment of the race: / The enemy is on the right! The enemy is on the right!" -- Kaspar Hauser: "Morgenpost", in Die Weltbühne, 27 November 1919, p. 674.

The paper did not shy away from calling on readers to no longer take vacations in Bavaria in protest against the anti-Jewish policies of the Kahr government. The campaign "Travelers, avoid Bavaria!" made waves, as is shown by the following reaction in an editorial by its satirical prototype, which is marked by extreme anti-Semitism: "Travelers, avoid Bavaria! That is the title of a piece of tripe what has written Chaim Wrobel, alias Teiteles Tucholsky, alias Isak Achselduft [‘armpit odor’], in the Weltbühne in the Spree city Berlin. He is, like all new Berliners, from Krotoschin in Galicia, where you scratch your butt with your left hand and bore into your schnozz with your right. (...) In Berlin, Teiteles is allowed to calmly write that the 'Kahr government is laughable', but if he comes down to us and says something like that, he’ll get such an old-fashioned Bavarian face-slapping that the fat he's stored up will be beaten right into butter. That's a secret we tell Teiteles." -- Anonymous (Ludwig Thoma) in the Miesbach Anzeiger, 2 February 1921

The Weltbühne was not only closely followed – and attacked – by representatives of the radical political right but also admired for its concept and linguistic standards. The nationalist Franz Schauwecker wrote to Ernst Jünger in January 1926: "You don’t know the Weltbühne? And the very similar Tagebuch? Then I urgently advise you to read these two small, splendidly edited weeklies of left-wing democracy. Urgently!" -- Cited by: Ulrich Fröschle: "Stefanie Oswalt: Siegfried Jacobsohn (rec.)"; in: Wirkendes Wort, nr. 3, December 2000, p. 463–466, here: p. 463.

Indeed, the Weltbühne seems to have provided a model for some nationalist papers.

Also noteworthy is a comment by the young conservative publisher Heinrich von Gleichen-Rußwurm, who combined his criticism of the Weltbühne's stance with a sharp disapproval of anti-Semitic rabble-rousing: "We refuse to defame the authors we oppose as Jews. We refuse to do so not only because we reject anti-Semitic agitation as morally tainted and politically unwise. Rather, we believe that we may not raise a racial objection against the authors of the Weltbühne because it is quite obvious that their viewpoint, chosen without regard to racial struggles and accepted by members of all races, is a viewpoint devoid of all responsibility, and it is precisely this irresponsibility – for which, incidentally, Judaism never forgives its racial members – that is the object of our criticism. In addition to this, the authors of the Weltbühne deny us the easier possibility which the second rank of this race offers, namely, the possibility of dismissing them by pointing out their linguistic incapacity, in short, their 'jabbering'; Peter Panter, Theobald Tiger – alias Kurt Tucholsky – and also Weinert and Kaminski jabber at most in excitement; otherwise they write a German which we would like to wish on the National Socialist press chiefs and student councils along with the faculty for German studies." -- "Kulturbolschewisten [Cultural Bolshevists]," in Der Ring, 30 October 1931, p. 830f., here p. 830.

The assessment by Reichstag member Anton Erkelenz quoted above can also be found in similar form in works that deal with the Weltbühne from a historical perspective. Rudolf Augstein, for example, criticized the paper's excessive demands on politicians: "In their intellectual and aesthetic sphere, the protagonists of the Weltbühne were personalities, this without a doubt. But this seduced them into an exaggerated search for personality in the political sphere, where, as is well known, the facts are not made of ethereal stuff. A ruling Social Democrat always had the advantage of falling flat as a personality. He was then called, for example, "fountain pen owner Hermann Müller". -- Rudolf Augstein: "Eine Republik und ihre Zeitschrift" [A Republic and its Newspaper], in: Der Spiegel, 1978, 42, p. 239–249, here p. 249.

The Weltbühne cannot however be accused of acting on the basis of purely idealistic and aesthetic values without any interest in exposing concrete abuses. Jacobsohn took a high personal risk when he published the reports on the Feme murders by patriotic associations in 1925. According to Ossietzky, Jacobsohn is said to have seen this as his most important journalistic achievement: "And if I had done nothing other than uncover the Feme murders, that would have been enough for me."

A passage from a letter Tucholsky wrote to Walter Hasenclever on 17 May 1933 reads like an anticipated response to postwar critics: "I am slowly becoming a megalomaniac – whenever I read how I have ruined Germany. For twenty years, however, the same thing has always pained me: That I have not been able to remove even one policeman from his post." -- Kurt Tucholsky: Politische Briefe [Political Letters], Reinbek, 1969, p. 24.

== Judgments about the Weltbühne ==
"The Weltbühne is a tribune in which the entire German left, in the broadest meaning of the word, has a voice; we demand from our staff clarity, personal rectitude and a good style. Whether this principle is correct or not is another question; it is how I took over the paper from my late teacher Siegfried Jacobsohn, and it is how I passed it on to Carl von Ossietzky, who did not deviate a finger’s width from this direction. The Weltbühne consciously refrains from rigid dogma; among us there is discussion." -- Kurt Tucholsky: "Die Rolle des Intellektuellen in der Partei” [The Role of the Intellectual in the Party], in: Die Front, 1929, No. 9, p. 250.

"Over the years the Weltbühne has often used the sharpest and harshest wording about German affairs. Because of this it has had to swallow accusations of treason from the right and of irresponsible, carping aesthetics from the left. The Weltbühne will continue to say what it deems necessary; it will remain as independent as before, it will be as polite or impertinent as the respective subject requires. It will retain the courage of its own opinions even in this country trembling under the elephant's tread of fascism." -- Carl von Ossietzky: "Rechenschaft" [Reckoning], in: Die Weltbühne, 10 May 1932, p. 692.

"The left-wing radical publicists of Kästner’s, Mehring’s or Tucholsky’s sort are the proletarian mimicry of the decayed bourgeoisie. Their function, viewed politically, is not to produce parties but cliques, viewed literarily, not schools but fashions, viewed economically, not producers but agents. And indeed, for fifteen years this left-wing intelligentsia has been the uninterrupted agent of all intellectual activity, from activism to expressionism to New Objectivity. Its political significance, however, exhausted itself in the transformation of revolutionary reflexes, insofar as they appeared in the bourgeoisie, into objects of diversion, of amusement, which allowed them to feed consumption." – Walter Benjamin: “Linke Melancholie" [The Left’s Melancholy], in: Die Gesellschaft 8 (1931), Vol. 1, p. 181–184.

"Against the Weltbühne and especially against Tucholsky, the NSDAP waged a daily battle from the very beginning. Tucholsky was a metaphor for all the Jewish shamelessness and impudence of the November Republic." – Alfred Rosenberg in a letter from 7 January 1937 to Robert Ley. Cited from: Léon Poliakow, Josef Wulf: Das Dritte Reich und seine Denker [The Third Reich and its Thinkers], Berlin 1959. Reprint Munich 1978, p. 42.

"The absence of tradition in many subjectively convinced democrats is shown by the fact that they, for their part, made the allegedly exclusively 'Western' character of democracy the basis of their propaganda, tactlessly and untactfully put their anti-Germanism, their enthusiasm for Western democracy, in the foreground, and thus unintentionally aided the reaction in its anti-democratic legend-building. (This ideology is most clearly visible in the circle of the Weltbühne of that time.)" -- Georg Lukacs: Die Zerstörung der Vernunft [The Destruction of Reason]. Berlin 1954

"The Weltbühne must also – there is no mistaking it – be counted among the gravediggers of the Weimar Republic (...). The metaphor of the gravedigger, as it is still used today, however, needs a correction. In only the rarest cases do the gravediggers cause the death. Rather, they put the corpse, the one already dead, under the earth. (...) I have no hesitation in calling the Weltbühne the most typical periodical production of the Weimar state, even though there were never more than 15,000 copies of this weekly printed." -- Rudolf Augstein Eine Republik und ihre Zeitschrift [A Republic and its Newspapers], in Der Spiegel, 1978, 42, pp. 239–249.

"Every democracy must be able to tolerate even radical journalistic criticism. But democracies must not allow democratic journalists’ ethics of responsibility to cross the line into principled hostility to the state. In its own way Carl von Ossietzky's Weltbühne contributed to weakening the deeply stricken republic yet more, even actively and without pardon discrediting it through his criticism from the left. Although von Ossietzky may have believed that he was always fighting for the Republic, in the end the effect that came from the leftist Weltbühne was destructive." -- Hans-Ulrich Wehler, "Leopold Schwarzschild contra Carl v. Ossietzky. Politische Vernunft für die Verteidigung der Republik gegen ultralinke 'Systemkritik' und Volksfront-Illusionen, [Leopold Schwarzschild versus Carl v. Ossietzky. Political Reason in Defense of the Republic against Ultra-Leftist 'Systemic Criticism' and Popular Front Illusions " idem: Preußen ist wieder chic ... Politik und Polemik in zwanzig Essays [Prussia is chic again … Politics and polemics in twenty essays]. Frankfurt a. M. 1983, pp. 77–83.

== Well-known and important contributors (1905–1933) ==
Name (Contributed from - to, Number of Articles); Pseudonym(s)

- Rudolf Arnheim (1925–1933, 174)
- Julius Bab (1905–1926, 339); Fero (1905–1923, 27)
- Adolf Behne (1922–1932, 72)
- Ernst Bloch (1919–1930, 19); Karl Knerz (1931, 2)
- Robert Breuer (aka Lucien Friedlaender) (1911–1931, 93); Cunctator (1915, 7); Germanicus (1916–1918, 117)
- Hermann Budzislawski (1932–1933, 9); Ulrich Schweitzer (1933, 1)
- Erich Dombrowski; Johannes Fischart (1918–1926, 128)
- Axel Eggebrecht (1925–1933, 48); Conrad Schulter (1926, 1); Arthur Eloesser (1870–1938)
- Lion Feuchtwanger (1908–1931, 94); J. L. Wetcheek (1926–1927, 2)
- Hellmut von Gerlach (1919–1933, 124)
- Alfons Goldschmidt (1918–1932, 119); Lorarius (1917–1918, 20)
- Ferdinand Hardekopf (1906–1907)
- Moritz Heimann (1914–1925, 44)
- Kurt Hiller (1915–1933, 167)
- Siegfried Jacobsohn (1905–1926, 1,796); Dr. Balduin (1905–1912, 2)
- Erich Kästner (1926–1933, 87)
- Harry Kahn (1907–1930, 144)
- Hanns-Erich Kaminski (1921–1933, 101)
- Klabund (1914–1928, 34)
- Walter Kreiser (1898–1958); Heinz Jäger (1929, 2)
- Gustav Landauer (1905–1929 (postum), 6)
- Else Lasker-Schüler (1905–1932, 15)
- Rudolf Leonhard (1916–1933, 32); Olf (1918–1919, 32)
- Richard Lewinsohn (1921–1932, 22); Morus (1921–1931, 389)
- Walter Mehring (1920–1933, 90)
- Erich Mühsam (1908–1932, 54)
- Carl von Ossietzky (1926–1933, 639); Celsus (1927–1933, 31); Thomas Murner (1932, 9); Lucius Schierling (1927–1928, 16)
- Alfred Polgar (1905–1933, 742)
- Walther Rode (1927–1934, 14)
- Erik Reger (1928–1932, 5)
- Friedrich Sieburg (1921–1925, 17)
- Hermann Sinsheimer (1905–1914, 53)
- Fritz Sternberg (1931–1932, 3); K. L. Gerstorff (1930–1933, 57); Thomas Tarn (1931–1933, 18)
- Heinrich Ströbel (1919–1920, 87)
- Ernst Toller (1920–1932, 50)
- Kurt Tucholsky (1913–1932, 64); Paulus Bünzly (1915–1922, 2); Kaspar Hauser (1918–1932, 183); Theobald Körner (1926, 1); Old Shatterhand (1927–1929, 2); Peter Panter (1913–1933, 525); Theobald Tiger (1913–1932, 405); Ignaz Wrobel (1913–1932, 449)
- Käthe Vordtriede (1926–1933, 2)
- Robert Walser (1907–1921, 58)
- Arnold Zweig (1914–1932, 69)

== Reprints ==
- Die Schaubühne. Vollständiger Nachdruck der Jahrgänge 1905–1918. Athenäum Verlag, Königstein/Ts. 1978–1980
- Die Weltbühne. Vollständiger Nachdruck der Jahrgänge 1918–1933. Athenäum Verlag, Königstein/Ts. 1978
- Die Wiener Weltbühne. Nachdruck der Originalausgabe. 1. Jahrgang 1932. o.A.
- Die neue Weltbühne. Nachdruck der Originalausgabe. 2. Jahrgang der Wiener Weltbühne, 1. Halbjahr 1933. o.A.
- Die neue Weltbühne. Nachdruck der Originalausgabe Prag/Paris 4/1933–8/1939.
