= Reichswehr =

Combined military forces of Germany 1921–1935

- War ensign of the Reichswehr (1921–1933)
- Founded: 6 March 1919; 107 years ago
- Disbanded: 16 March 1935; 91 years ago
- Service branches: Reichsheer; Reichsmarine
- Headquarters: Zossen, Brandenburg

Leadership
- Commander-in-chief: Friedrich Ebert (1919–25); Paul von Hindenburg (1925–34); Adolf Hitler (1934–35)
- Reichswehr Minister: See list
- Chief of the ministerial office: See list

Personnel
- Military age: 18–45
- Conscription: No
- Active personnel: 115,000 (1921)

Related articles
- History: German revolution Greater Poland uprising Silesian Uprisings; Ruhr uprising
- Ranks: Military ranks of the Reichswehr

Reichswehr (German: [ˈʁaɪ̯çsveːɐ̯]; lit. 'Reich Defence') was the official name of the German armed forces during the Weimar Republic and the first two years of Nazi Germany. After Germany was defeated in World War I, the Imperial German Army (Deutsches Heer) was dissolved in order to be reshaped into a peacetime army. From it a provisional Reichswehr was formed in March 1919. Under the terms of the Treaty of Versailles, the rebuilt German Army was subject to severe limitations in size, structure and armament. The official formation of the Reichswehr took place on 1 January 1921 after the limitations had been met. The German armed forces kept the name Reichswehr until Adolf Hitler's 1935 proclamation of "restoration of military sovereignty", at which point it became part of the new Wehrmacht.

Although ostensibly apolitical, the Reichswehr acted as a state within a state, and its leadership was an important political power factor in the Weimar Republic. The Reichswehr sometimes supported the democratic government, as it did in the Ebert-Groener Pact when it pledged its loyalty to the Republic, and sometimes backed anti-democratic forces through such means as the Black Reichswehr, the illegal paramilitary groups it sponsored in contravention of the Versailles Treaty. The Reichswehr saw itself as a cadre army that would preserve the expertise of the old imperial military and form the basis for German rearmament.

== Structure of the Reichswehr ==
=== Arms limitations under the Treaty of Versailles ===
In Part V of the 1919 Versailles Treaty, Germany had obligated itself to limit the size and armaments of its military forces so that they could be used only as border protection and for the maintenance of order within Germany.

In accordance with the treaty's provisions, personnel strength was limited to a professional army of 100,000 men plus a 15,000-man navy. The establishment of a general staff was prohibited. Heavy weapons above defined calibres, armoured vehicles, submarines and large warships were prohibited, as was any type of air force. The regulations were overseen by the Military Inter-Allied Commission of Control until 1927.

Conscription into the German Army had traditionally been for a period of 1 to 3 years. After they had completed their terms of service, the discharged soldiers created a large pool of trained reserves. The Versailles Treaty fixed the term of service for Reichswehr officers at 25 years and for all others at 12 in order to prevent such a buildup of reservists.

=== Founding ===
On 9 November 1918, at the beginning of the German Revolution that led to the collapse of the German Empire and the flight of Emperor Wilhelm II, a republic was proclaimed from Berlin. The next day, German Chancellor Friedrich Ebert and General Wilhelm Groener, acting in the name of the Supreme Army Command, concluded the Ebert–Groener Pact. In it Groener assured Ebert of the loyalty of the armed forces, and in return Ebert promised that the government would take prompt action against leftist uprisings, call a national assembly, keep the military command within the professional officer corps and, most importantly, retain the military's traditional status as 'state within a state' – that is, it would continue to be largely independent of the civilian government.

As part of the Armistice of 11 November 1918, the new German government agreed to the speedy evacuation of occupied territories. The withdrawal on the western front began on 12 November and by 17 January 1919 the areas on the west bank of the Rhine were free of German military forces. The task was then to gradually disarm the units of the Imperial Army which still numbered several million soldiers. This was done at previously designated demobilisation sites, usually the respective home garrisons. For the regiments with garrisons on the west bank of the Rhine, demobilisation sites were designated in the interior of the Reich.

The Council of the People's Deputies – the de facto government of Germany from November 1918 until February 1919 – and the Supreme Army Command intended to transfer the remaining units to a peacetime army following demobilisation. On 6 March 1919 the Weimar National Assembly passed a law on the formation of a provisional army to be made up of 43 brigades. It authorised the Reich President "to dissolve the existing army and to form a provisional Reichswehr which, until the creation of a new armed force to be ordered by Reich law, would protect the borders of the Reich, enforce the orders of the Reich government, and maintain domestic peace and order."

A similarly worded law on the formation of a provisional navy dated 16 April 1919 authorised it to "secure the German coasts, enable safe maritime traffic by clearing mines, acting as maritime police and otherwise assisting merchant shipping, ensure the undisturbed exercise of fishing, enforce the orders of the Reich government in conjunction with the Reichswehr, and maintain peace and order." The strength of the navy was to be 20,000 men.

From 1 October 1919 to 1 April 1920, the forces of the Provisional Reich Army were moved into the 400,000-strong 'Transitional Army' consisting of 20 brigades. At the same time, the old army's units and duties were eliminated. After falling to 150,000 men in October 1920, the brigades were replaced by regiments, and the final army strength of 100,000 was reached by 1 January 1921. The Reichswehr was officially formed on that date, with the Defence Law of 23 March 1921 regulating the details. The soldiers' oath was sworn to the Weimar Constitution.

=== Structure ===
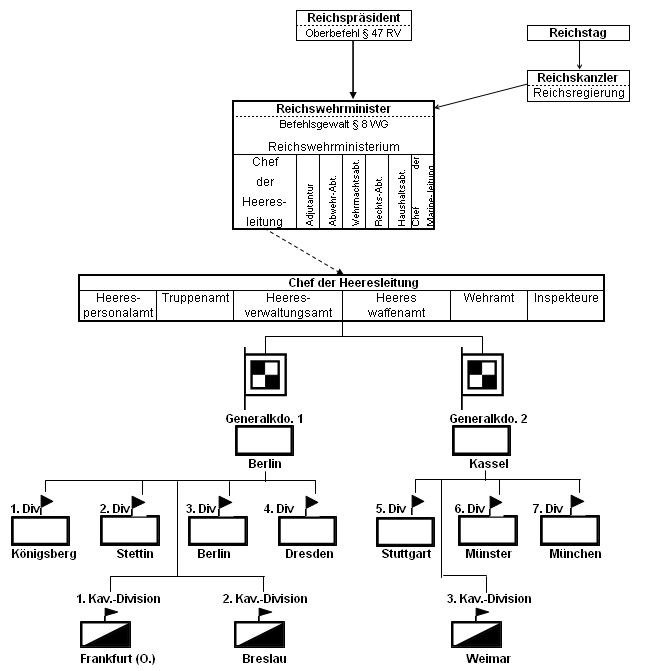
Structure of the Reichswehr, 1920–1934

The Reichswehr was divided into the Reichsheer (army) and the Reichsmarine (navy). The Reichsheer consisted of seven infantry and three cavalry divisions, with all units renumbered. The Reich's territory was divided into seven military districts. There were two group commands, No. 1 in Berlin and No. 2 in Kassel. The navy was allowed a limited number of certain types of ships and boats, with no submarines. It was divided into Naval Station Baltic Sea and Naval Station North Sea. Under the terms of the Versailles Treaty, the service period for enlisted men and non-commissioned officers in both the army and the navy was 12 years, with 25 years for officers.

The 1921 Defence Law ended the military sovereignty of the states but left Saxony, Württemberg, Baden, and Bavaria with limited independence. Bavaria was special in that Military District VII covered the entire territory of the state with the exception of the Palatinate, and only Bavarians served in the 7th (Bavarian) Division. Until 1924 this unit, known as the Bavarian Reichswehr, enjoyed certain rights of autonomy with respect to the Reich government.

=== Commanders ===
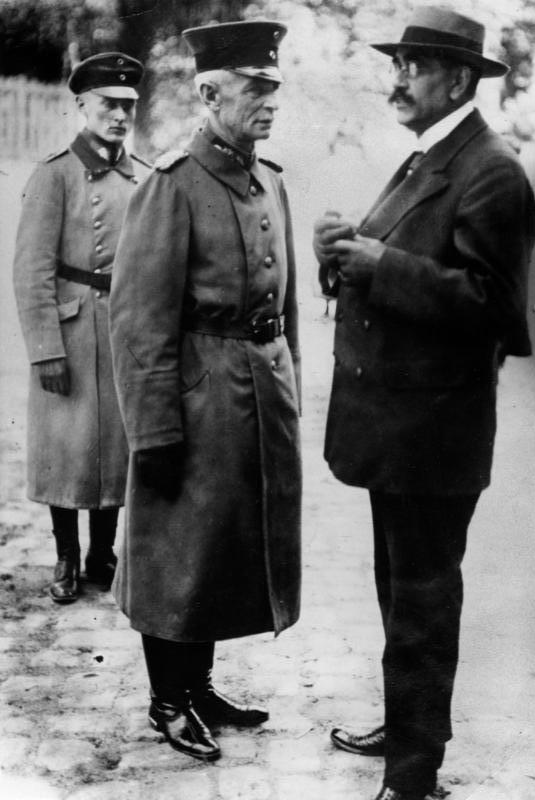
Gustav Noske (right) with Walther von Lüttwitz (1920)

According to the Weimar Constitution, the Reich President had "supreme command over the entire armed forces of the Reich". In general, however, he could act only if there was a countersignature by a member of the government. In terms of authority, this was the Reichswehr minister.

Two Reich Presidents held office during the Weimar Republic: Friedrich Ebert until 1925, followed by Paul von Hindenburg. The first Reichswehr Minister was Gustav Noske, who was replaced by Otto Gessler after the Kapp Putsch in 1920. Wilhelm Groener took office in 1928, and his deputy Kurt von Schleicher replaced him in 1932. Schleicher continued to hold office on a provisional basis during his two-month chancellorship. Prior to Adolf Hitler's appointment as Reich chancellor, Hindenburg unilaterally – not at the chancellor's recommendation as required by the constitution – appointed Werner von Blomberg as Reichswehr Minister.

The head of army command was initially General Walther Reinhardt. After the Kapp Putsch, General Hans von Seeckt took over the post and had both the Communist Party of Germany (KPD) and the Nazi Party banned in 1923. Wilhelm Heye followed him in 1926. Heye was succeeded in 1930 by Kurt Freiherr von Hammerstein-Equord, who tendered his resignation on 27 December 1933. He was succeeded by Werner von Fritsch.

=== Social composition ===
Given the limited size of the army, careful selection of personnel was possible. Experienced leaders came from the 'Old Army' of the Empire. In 1927, 20% of the officers were from the former nobility, down from 30% in 1913. This continued the long-term trend of a reduction in the percentage of noble officers. Large parts of the officer corps held a conservative, monarchist worldview and rejected the Weimar Republic. Especially within the former nobility, however, the stance towards National Socialism was not without criticism.

The Reichswehr leadership and officer corps successfully resisted the democratisation of the troops. Preference was given to recruits from the predominantly conservative rural areas of Germany. The Reichswehr leadership considered them not only physically superior to young men from the cities but also as able to stand up against the "temptations" of social democracy.

In 1926 Reichstag President Paul Löbe proposed to make recruitment dependent on physical fitness only in order to make the composition of the Reichswehr reflect more closely that of society as a whole. The proposal led to fierce opposition from the Reichswehr and conservative circles, both of which believed that opening the Reichswehr to all social groups would lower its effectiveness. Löbe's proposal did not pass.

The Reichswehr saw itself as a 'cadre army' or 'Leader army' ('Führerarmee'), which meant that every unit kept close ties to its former members and could hope to call on them in a time of need. This was to become a basic prerequisite for the rapid growth of the army after the proclamation of military sovereignty by the Nazi regime in 1935.

=== Officers in the Reichswehr ===
Under the terms of the Versailles Treaty, the Reichswehr was allowed 4,000 officers, while the Reichsmarine could have 1,500 officers and deck officers. The actual Reichswehr officer corps numbered 3,718, down from 227,081 in 1918, of whom 38,118 were career officers. The officers transferred to the Reichswehr were almost all general staff officers. Of the approximately 15,000 men who had been promoted to officers during the war, the Reichswehr took on only a few, as these front-line officers were seen as alien to officer life in the mess hall, barracks, and society. Democratically-minded officers were not accepted into the force. Radical nationalist officers were with few exceptions removed, especially after the Kapp Putsch.

The political attitude of the officer corps was monarchist, although outwardly they posed as loyal to the Republic. Even though the German nobility, which was officially abolished in August 1919, had accounted for only 0.14% of the pre-war German population, an average of 23.8% of the officers in the Reichswehr were from noble backgrounds. The proportion of former noble officers in the individual branches of the armed forces varied greatly. In 1920 they made up 50% of the officers in the cavalry but only 5% in the infantry and 4% in the sappers. Of the approximately 1,000 non-commissioned officers promoted to officers in 1919, by 1928 only 117 remained, or 3.5% of the total officers in the Reichswehr.

Since the Reich government did not bring the officer candidate recruitment process under state control, regimental commanders in the Reichswehr continued to be responsible for selecting officer candidates, as they had in the old Imperial Army. Those admitted came almost exclusively from circles traditionally close to the military. In 1926, 96% of the officer candidates came from the upper social classes and nearly 50% from officer families. The homogeneity of the Reichswehr officer corps was in fact greater than it had been during the Empire. In 1912/13 only 24% of officers had come from families of active or former officers.

== Reichswehr in the Weimar Republic ==
By assuring Friedrich Ebert of its loyalty in the November 1918 Ebert-Groener Pact, the military had ensured the survival of the new government. In the crisis-ridden early 1920s, the Republic used the Reichswehr primarily to fight insurgent left-wing forces, such as during the Spartacist uprising in Berlin in 1919.

=== Cooperation with the Freikorps ===
Wherever the Treaty of Versailles tied the Reichswehr's hands or its own manpower was insufficient, it left 'national defence' – e.g. border skirmishes against Polish and Lithuanian irregulars, or deployment in 1920 against the Ruhr uprising in the demilitarised Rhineland – to the Freikorps, which continued to operate even though it had been officially disbanded in 1920. In 1923 General von Seeckt, who had the backing of Otto Gessler, organised "civilian work groups" called Arbeits-Kommandos (AKs) that were attached to Reichswehr units and received training and support from them. The AKs, better known as the Black Reichswehr, whose members were largely ex-Freikorps, had a peak strength of about 20,000 men and allowed the Reichswehr to clandestinely exceed the Versailles Treaty's 100,000-man limit. On 1 October 1923, about 4,000 of its members attempted a putsch at Küstrin on the Oder river east of Berlin. After its failure, Seeckt quickly had the Black Reichswehr disbanded.

Reichswehr generals also maintained close contacts with politically right-wing, anti-republican military associations such as the Stahlhelm and Kyffhäuserbund, although the Reichswehr officially described itself as "apolitical".

=== Passivity during the Kapp Putsch ===
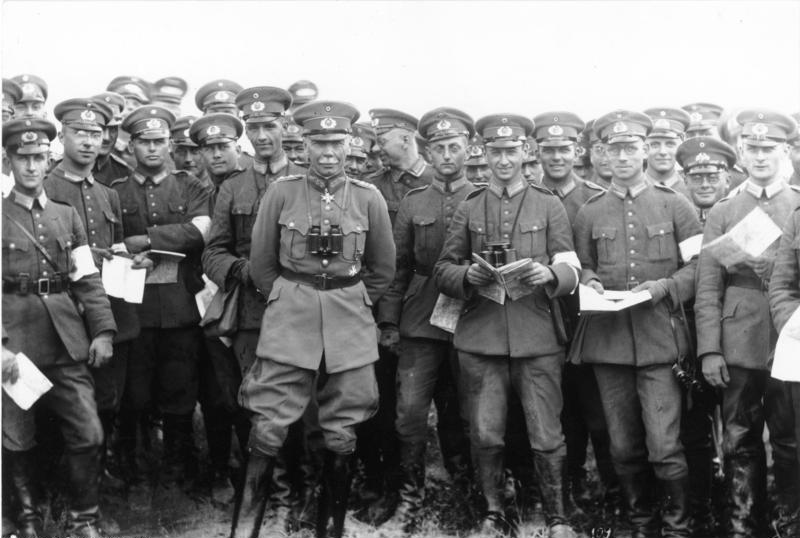
General Hans von Seeckt at a Reichswehr exercise in 1925

In March 1920, Germany's political leadership did not use the Reichswehr against the Kapp Putsch, a failed coup attempt against the Weimar Republic. It occurred after the government tried to demobilise two Freikorps brigades and one of them, the Marinebrigade Ehrhardt, refused to disband. When Defence Minister Noske consulted with the Reichswehr's leadership, only General Reinhardt, Chief of Army Command, recommended the use of army troops in defence of the government. The rest of the generals, including Hans von Seeckt, chief of the Truppenamt – the disguised general staff of the Reichswehr – advised against deploying troops. He is reported to have said, "Reichswehr will not fire on Reichswehr". The only alternative left to the government was to flee Berlin. (By contrast, the left-wing Ruhr uprising, which began during the Kapp Putsch, was ruthlessly put down with the active involvement of the Reichswehr.) As a result of the Kapp Putsch, Noske was replaced by Otto Gessler.

=== Circumvention of the Treaty of Versailles ===
The Reichswehr leadership began early on to circumvent the arms restrictions in the Versailles Treaty through a series of secret and illegal measures. They included the clandestine establishment of the Black Reichswehr, unauthorised weapons testing in the Soviet Union, the establishment of a Leaders' Assistant Training School (Führergehilfenschulung) which was intended to compensate for the forbidden General Staff training, and the maintenance of the General Staff in the newly created Truppenamt. Under the code name 'Statistical Society', plans for an armaments industry were worked out with the Reich Federation of German Industry. With the help of retired officers, sports schools for training infantrymen were founded, most of them near former military training areas, where exercise instructors for military sports were trained. This took place, especially in northern Germany, with the support of the veterans' group Der Stahlhelm. Other aids in military training included the use of dummy tanks for exercise purposes.

=== Secret cooperation with the Soviet Union ===
In February 1923 the new Chief of the Truppenamt, Major General Otto Hasse, travelled to Moscow for secret negotiations. Germany was to support the development of Soviet industry, and Red Army commanders were to receive general staff training in Germany. In return, the Reichswehr was able to expand secretly in contravention of the Treaty of Versailles. It was given the opportunity to obtain artillery from the Soviet Union, to train aviation and tank specialists on Soviet soil, and to have chemical warfare agents manufactured and tested. A secret Reichswehr aviation school and testing facility was established at Lipetsk, where some 120 military pilots, 100 aerial observers, and numerous ground personnel were trained as the core of a future German Air Force. At Kazan, tank specialists were trained, but not until 1930 and to a number of only about thirty. At the Tomka gas test site near Saratov, chemical warfare agents were jointly tested and developed.

In December 1926, Social Democrat Philipp Scheidemann disclosed the collaboration with the Soviet Union to the Reichstag, toppling the government under Wilhelm Marx. In 1931 Carl von Ossietzky and Walter Kreiser were convicted of espionage in the Weltbühne Trial for a 1929 report in the weekly Weltbühne on the collaboration, which was by then already known.

=== Crisis in Bavaria and the Beer Hall Putsch ===
General Otto von Lossow, commander of Reichswehr troops in Bavaria during Hitler's Beer Hall Putsch

On 26 September 1923, the Bavarian government declared a state of emergency and placed executive power in the hands of Gustav Ritter von Kahr as state commissioner. The government in Berlin responded by declaring a nationwide state of emergency, and President Ebert transferred executive power to Otto Gessler. After General Otto von Lossow, who was in command of the Reichswehr troops in Bavaria, refused to act on Gessler's order to ban the Nazi newspaper Völkischer Beobachter, the Reich government had few options to enforce the subsequent order to relieve Lossow of his command. Seeckt's dictum that Reichswehr would not fire on Reichswehr still stood. When news of Adolf Hitler's Beer Hall Putsch reached Berlin on 8 November, Ebert transferred executive power from Gessler to Seeckt, even though there was no assurance that he would act in the interests of the Republic. Given the way events in Munich unfolded, there was no need for Seeckt to take direct action. Kahr turned against Hitler, and the Reichswehr division in Bavaria did not support the putsch. In February 1924 Seeckt relinquished the executive powers he had received through Ebert.

=== Seeckt and the events of 1924–1932 ===
The 1925 Locarno Treaties ruled out any forcible change in Germany's western borders, and in 1926 Germany joined the League of Nations. While war continued to be seen in the Reichswehr as a means to achieve political goals, government policy under the Locarno Treaties and the Dawes Plan, which for the short term resolved the issue of German reparations payments to the victorious powers, was oriented more toward maintaining peace and international understanding. Seeckt and his officers were opposed to joining the League of Nations and saw their existence threatened by the pacifism of Germany's left.

After the election of Paul von Hindenburg as Reich president in 1925, his status as victor in the 1914 Battle of Tannenberg made him a figure with whom Reichswehr soldiers identified. In October 1926, without seeking government approval, Seeckt invited Crown Prince Wilhelm, the son of former emperor Wilhelm II, to attend army manoeuvres in the uniform of the old Imperial 1st Foot Guards. It created a storm when the republican press publicised the transgression. Gessler told Hindenburg that Seeckt had to resign or he would do so himself. He was supported by the cabinet, so Hindenburg asked for and received Seeckt's resignation on 9 October.

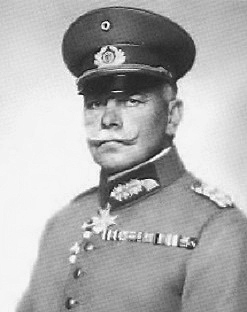
Wilhelm Heye, the third chief of the German High Command

Seeckt was succeeded by General Wilhelm Heye, although it was primarily General Kurt von Schleicher who gained additional power. Under his leadership, the Reichswehr intervened in politics more often in order to achieve its goals, with the result that the Republic and the Reichswehr moved closer together.

In February 1927 the Military Inter-Allied Commission of Control, which until then had supervised disarmament, withdrew from Germany.

The decision to build the pocket battleship Deutschland in 1928, which was in compliance with the provisions of the Treaty of Versailles and seen as a matter of prestige, caused problems for the Social Democrat Reich Chancellor Hermann Müller because his party had campaigned against the ship, but his cabinet members voted for it in order to save the coalition government. For the Reichswehr leadership, the vote was a landmark political decision. The 1929 budget included the first installment for the Deutschland's sister ship, the Admiral Scheer.

The rapprochement between the Republic and the Reichswehr brought the greatest gains to the Reichswehr. It achieved an increase in the defence budget, and criticism of the increase was seen as an attack on the Reichswehr and thus on the state.

=== End of the Weimar Republic ===
Because of Hindenburg's support for the Reichswehr, the presidential cabinets from 1930 onward increased its power. Chancellor Heinrich Brüning was embraced as a former soldier by the Reichswehr. Franz von Papen and Kurt Schleicher, the two chancellors who followed Brüning, considered using the Reichswehr as part of their plans to abolish democracy. In addition, one of the presidential cabinets' main objectives was a revision of the Treaty of Versailles that would do away with the military limitations it imposed.

In 1931 and 1932, a series of actions by the Reichswehr and its leadership showed its increasing power and drift towards the Nazis:

- When the Harzburg Front, an anti-democratic alliance that included the Nazi Party, was formed in 1931, fifteen men who were admirals or generals during the First World War – including Hans von Seeckt – were present.
- In 1932 Reichswehr Minister Groener, under pressure from several German states, outlawed the Nazi Sturmabteilung (SA) and Schutzstaffel (SS). He did so in his capacity as acting minister of the Interior, whereas his goal as Reichswehr minister was to integrate the SA into a non-partisan paramilitary force. Schleicher, Groener's subordinate at the Ministry of the Reichswehr, told him that by outlawing the SA he had lost the trust of the Reichswehr, and as a result he resigned as Reichswehr minister.
- On 13 September 1932, at the initiative of President Hindenburg, the Reich Board for Youth Training was founded for the military education of German youth. It was implemented by Chancellor Schleicher, then disbanded and merged into the Hitler Youth in 1933.
- In the Prussian coup d'état of July 1932, violent unrest in Altona (Hamburg), particularly a bloody clash between the police, the SA and communists, led Chancellor Papen to use an emergency decree issued by President Hindenburg under Article 48 of the Weimar Constitution to temporarily transfer executive power in Prussia to the Reichswehr minister.

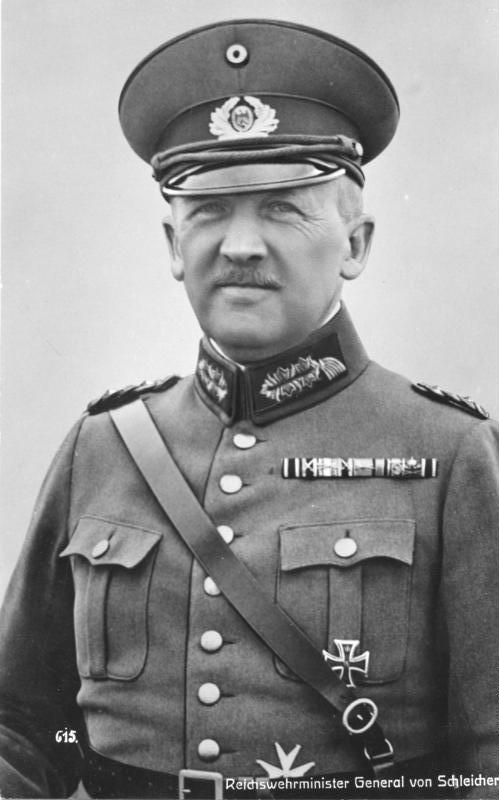
Kurt von Schleicher. After Seeckt's resignation, Schleicher made the Reichswehr increasingly political.

While Seeckt was head of the Army Command, he reorganized the Reichswehr so that it could be rapidly expanded when free of the restrictions of the Treaty of Versailles. He had done so while accepting the Weimar Republic as the framework in which he had to work, in spite of his fundamental dislike of parliamentary democracy. Following his forced resignation in 1926, von Schleicher became the driving force behind shaping the military. He used a more "modern" approach that relied on a combination of political, military, and economic factors. Germany's economic position was to be strengthened and France relegated to the role of a junior partner. The supremacy thus gained in Europe was to form the basis for a position of world power. Historian Klaus-Jürgen Müller sees in this one of the "lines of continuity" of German development from the Empire to National Socialism and the cause of an "entente" between the traditional military elites and the Hitler movement in 1933. Hitler was dependent on their support in his rise to power, while Schleicher and the military needed Hitler's supporters as a "mass base".

=== State within a state ===
Historians of the Weimar Republic differ on the question of whether the Reichswehr was a "state within a state". Those who argue that it was point to an officer corps that opposed the parliamentary republic and to General von Seeckt's insistence that the Reichswehr be apolitical, a position that was supported by the laws of the Reich, which denied members of the Reichswehr the right to vote and subjected them to internal Reichswehr jurisdiction. By distancing itself from politics and the government, the Reichswehr's relationship to the civilian leadership became problematic. Its loyalty was to an abstract state rather than the regime, and its insulation from the political world of itself led to it becoming a state within the state. In his 1929 Thoughts of a Soldier (Gedanken eines Soldaten), Seeckt wrote, "The Army should become a State within the State, but it should be merged into the State through service; in fact it should itself become the purest image of the State." The outward situation changed in 1928 when the Reichswehr created the Ministeramt, or Office of Ministerial Affairs, under Kurt von Schleicher to lobby the government. In the late 1920s, the parliamentary system was beginning to break down and move towards the presidential cabinets of Brüning, Papen and Schleicher. The military had strengthened itself during its period of isolation, and through President Hindenburg was able as a state within the state to exert significant control over the choice of chancellor and the political direction of the Reich.

Those on the other side of the issue argue that the subordination of the military to the constitutional institutions of the Republic prevented the creation of a state within a state. Articles 46 and 47 of the Weimar Constitution gave the president of the Reich "supreme command over the entire military forces of the Reich" and the power to appoint and remove military officers. Peace treaties and declarations of war required a national law (Article 45), which had to originate from and be approved by the legislature. In addition, General Seeckt was fundamentally loyal and helped the state to consolidate. When in 1923 Defence Minister Otto Gessler was given executive functions to deal with the nation's crises, the power went in essence to Seeckt. He acted in the interests of Germany in preventing a possible civil war over the end of passive resistance to the occupation of the Ruhr and then during the communist threat of the German October in Saxony and Thuringia. Maintaining the integrity of the Reich and the Army were his top priorities. With the power in his hands, he could have staged a putsch or made himself dictator, but he did neither and voluntarily returned the powers to the political authorities when the crises had passed. And in 1926, he lost his position as head of the Army Command at the demand of Reichswehr Minister Gessler.

== Reichswehr under Adolf Hitler ==
War ensign of the Reichswehr (1933–1935) and in the early Wehrmacht period (1935 – before the swastika was adopted as the national flag of Nazi Germany). It differs from the previously used version in removing the upper left corner in the national colours of the Weimar Republic (black, red and gold).

After becoming chancellor at the end of January 1933, Hitler presented his government program to the generals on 3 February. He promised them among other things that the Reichswehr would remain Germany's sole armed force and announced the reintroduction of conscription. The Reichswehr hoped for increased efforts to revise the Treaty of Versailles and to build a strong military and firm state leadership, but it also feared that the Reichswehr would be supplanted by the 3 million member SA. Its leader Ernst Röhm and his colleagues thought of their force as the future army of Germany, replacing the smaller Reichswehr and its professional officers. The Reichswehr supported Hitler in taking power away from the SA in the summer of 1934. Röhm wanted to become Reichswehr minister, and in February 1934 demanded that the much smaller Reichswehr be merged into the SA to form a true people's army. This alarmed both political and military leaders, and to forestall the possibility of a coup, Hitler sided with conservative leaders and the military. In the Night of the Long Knives (30 June–2 July 1934) Röhm and the leadership of the SA were murdered along with many other political adversaries of the Nazis, including Reichswehr generals Schleicher and Ferdinand von Bredow. The Reichswehr officer corps acknowledged the murders without objection.

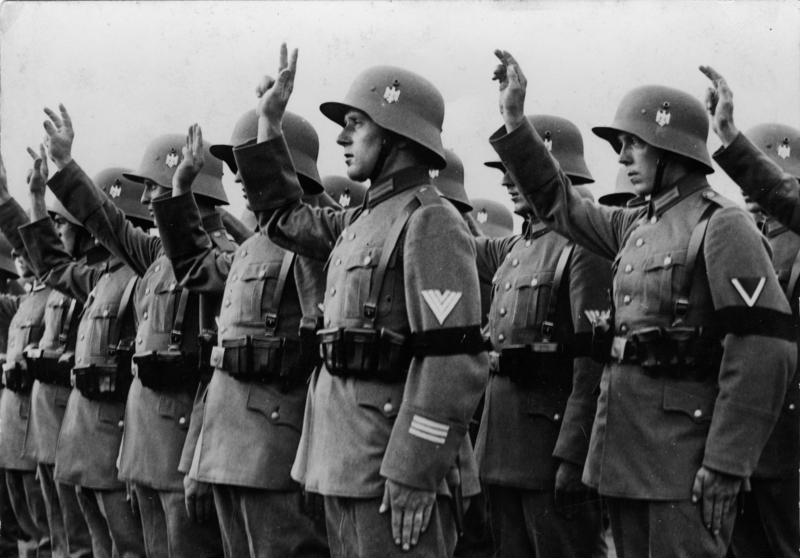
Reichsheer soldiers swearing the Hitler oath in August 1934, with hands raised in the traditional schwurhand gesture

During 1933 and 1934 the Reichswehr began a secret program of expansion. In December 1933 the army staff decided to increase the active strength to 300,000 men in 21 divisions. On 1 April 1934, between 50,000 and 60,000 new recruits entered the force and were assigned to special training battalions. The original seven infantry divisions of the Reichswehr were expanded to 21, with military district headquarters increased to the size of a corps headquarters on 1 October 1934. These divisions used cover names to hide their divisional size, but during October 1935 they were dropped. Also during October 1934, the officers who had been forced to retire in 1919 were recalled. Those who were no longer fit for combat were assigned to administrative positions, thus releasing fit officers for front-line duties.

On 2 August 1934, the day Hindenburg died, Reichswehr Minister Werner von Blomberg, who was originally to have helped 'tame' the Nazis, had the Reichswehr swear its oath personally to Hitler. Under the Weimar Republic the oath had been to the constitution.

On 1 March 1935, the Luftwaffe was established and on 16 March universal conscription was reintroduced, both of which violated the Treaty of Versailles. In the same act, the Reichswehr was renamed the Wehrmacht. On 1 June 1935, the Reichsheer (the army contingent of the Reichswehr) was renamed 'Heer' ('army') and the Reichsmarine became the Kriegsmarine ('war navy'). Hitler had foreshadowed his intention to replace the Reichswehr in March 1929, when he declared in a speech in Munich:

“It is in part the Army's responsibility whether Marxism wins or we. If the left is going to win thanks to the non-political attitude of the officers, then you can write the Reichswehr off, this will be the end of it! ... As far as we are concerned, the Reichswehr in its present form is not permanent. For us it will serve as a great cadre army, which produces officers, NCOs; we shall crush anyone into pieces who should dare to hinder us in this undertaking”

== See also ==
- Ministry of the Reichswehr
- Weimar paramilitary groups
