= Soldiers are murderers =

1931 opinion piece quote

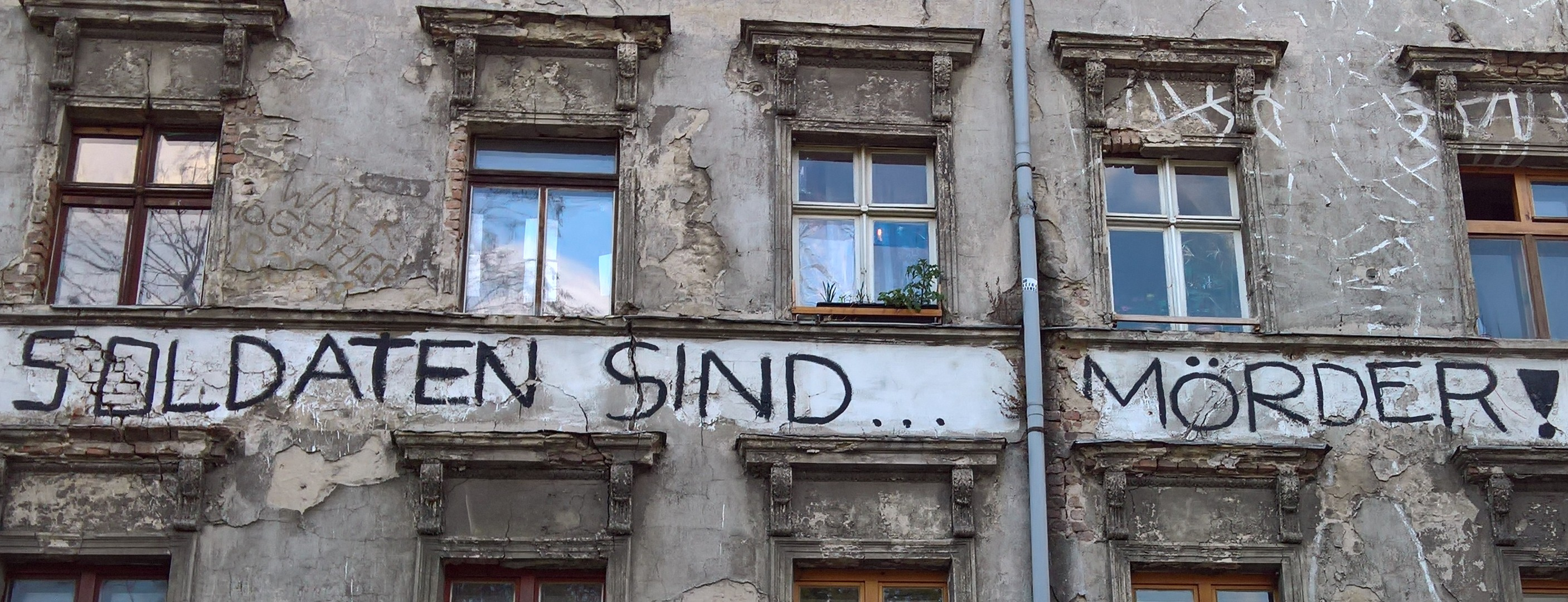
A building in Berlin displays the slogan, April 2016

"Soldiers are murderers" (German: Soldaten sind Mörder) is a quote from an opinion piece written in 1931 by Kurt Tucholsky and published under his pseudonym Ignaz Wrobel in the weekly German magazine Die Weltbühne. Starting with a lawsuit against the magazine's editor Carl von Ossietzky for "defamation of the Reichswehr" in 1932, Tucholsky's widely quoted assertion led to numerous judicial proceedings in Germany, also after World War II and until the late 20th century. In several cases in the 1990s, last in 1995, the Federal Constitutional Court ruled that using the quote as a means to express pacifist views is protected by the constitution of Germany.

== Origin ==
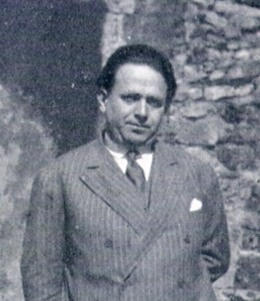
Kurt Tucholsky, author of "Soldaten sind Mörder"

Journalist, writer, and satirist Kurt Tucholsky was conscripted as a soldier in World War I, and in 1919 co-founded the Friedensbund der Kriegsteilnehmer, a pacifist and anti-militarist organization of war veterans. The 4 August 1931 issue of Die Weltbühne had pacifism as its main subject matter, containing a translation of Pope Benedict XV's anti-war Apostolic exhortation Allorché fummo chiamati of 1915. In this context, Tucholsky published his short piece "Der bewachte Kriegsschauplatz" ("The guarded theatre of war"). It is mainly criticizing the Feldgendarmerie military police for, according to Tucholsky, having taken care of "correct dying" at the front ("daß vorn richtig gestorben wurde") whilst shooting deserters: "So they murdered because one refused to continue murdering". The controversial quote appears in this paragraph:

Da gab es vier Jahre lang ganze Quadratmeilen Landes, auf denen war der Mord obligatorisch, während er eine halbe Stunde davon entfernt ebenso streng verboten war. Sagte ich: Mord? Natürlich Mord. Soldaten sind Mörder.

— Kurt Tucholsky: "Der bewachte Kriegsschauplatz", Die Weltbühne, 4 August 1931.
Translation:

For four years there were entire square miles of land upon which murder was obligatory, whereas a half-hour's distance away it was strictly forbidden. Did I say "Murder"? Of course murder. Soldiers are murderers.

— Translation by Justin Collings.

Tucholsky had put forward his opinion that soldiers are murderers publicly before 1931, speaking of "professional murderers" and "murdered murderers", however without a strong public reaction. After publication of the Weltbühne issue, defence minister Wilhelm Groener filed a suit against editor Carl von Ossietzky who was at that time already in prison due to his conviction in the Weltbühne-Prozess. No charges were brought against Tucholsky because he had moved to Sweden in 1929 and was therefore out of reach for German courts. Tucholsky considered attending the trial in Germany to back his friend Ossietzky, but decided against it for fear of being attacked by Nazis. Even years later, shortly before his death, Tucholsky expressed pangs of conscience about this decision. Tucholsky provided Ossietzky's counsels for defence with quotes by famous personalities who had called soldiers murderers before. In his closing words, the defendant Ossietzky expressed the view that the article was not a "defamation of a profession", but "defamation of war".

The jury of the Berlin Schöffengericht acquitted Ossietzky on 1 July 1932 with the reasoning that the general expression "soldiers are murderers" is not directed against specific persons and therefore can not be a defamation. A notice of appeal of the prosecution was not admitted by the Kammergericht. Also in reaction to the acquittal, Reichspräsident Paul von Hindenburg subsequently created a new law article per emergency decree, adding a special "protection of soldiers' honour" to the criminal code (§ 134a StGB). The protection was specific to the Reichswehr and did not extend to soldiers in general, however. § 134a StGB was repealed together with § 134b StGB (a special protection of the Nazi Party's honour) in 1946 by the Allied Control Council.

== Later disputes in West Germany ==
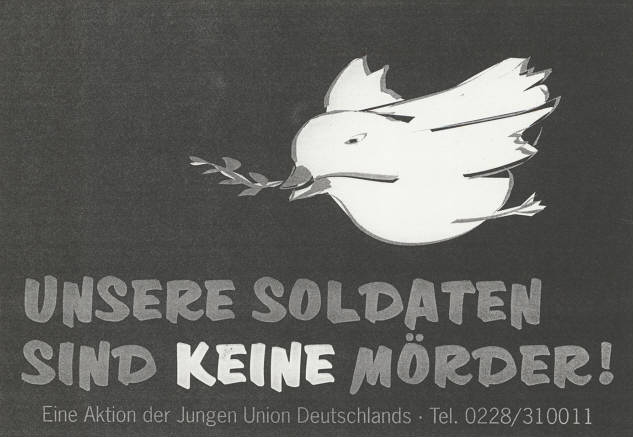
CDU leaflet argues that "our" soldiers are not murderers ("Unsere Soldaten sind keine Mörder!")

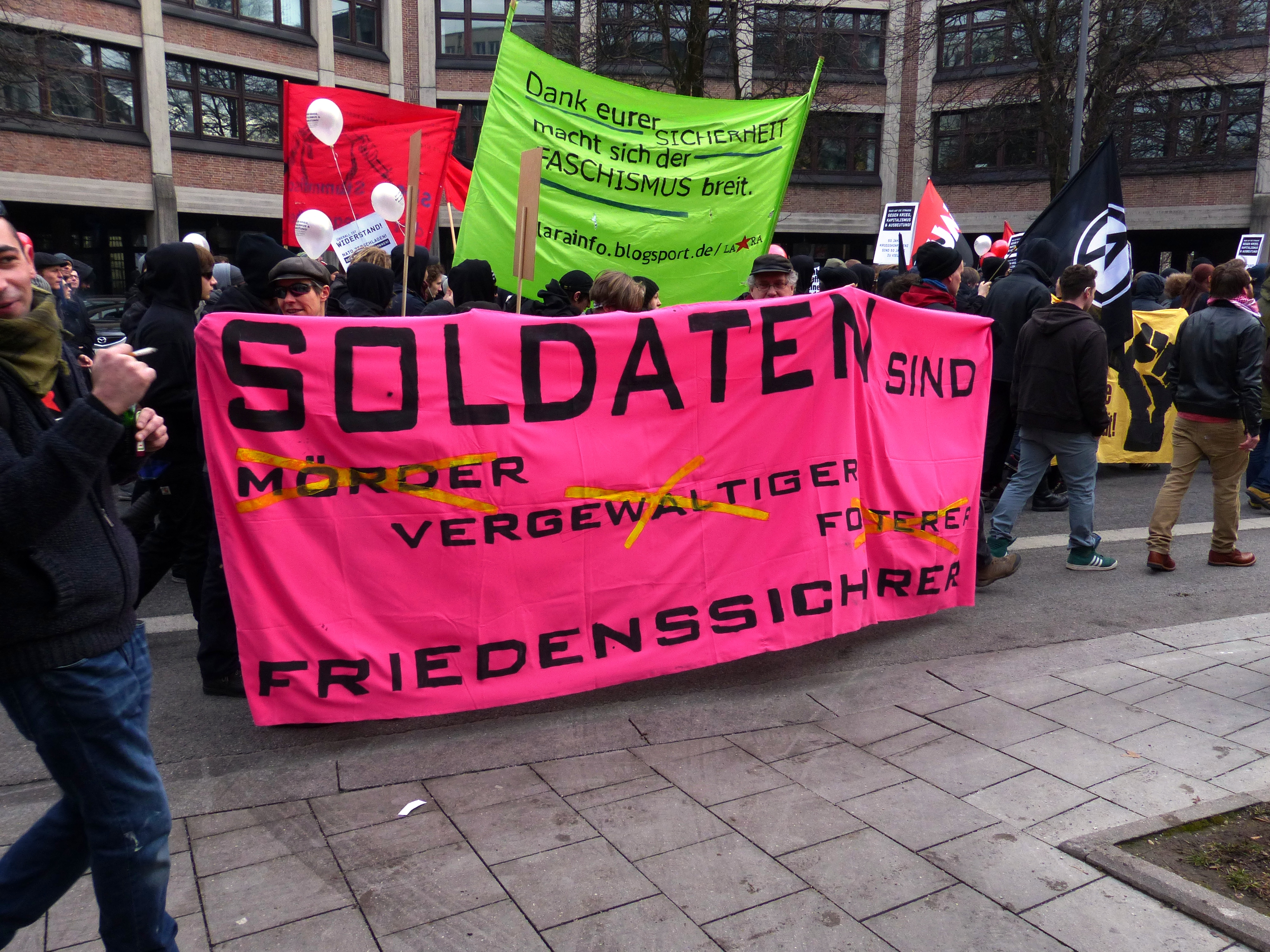
Protest against the 2014 Munich Security Conference

The court case made the expression a popular slogan for peace activists and anti-militarists. Especially starting with the "Frankfurt soldier rulings" in 1984, West German courts were repeatedly concerned with Tucholsky's quote, though there were earlier cases. At a panel discussion in Frankfurt, a doctor of the International Physicians for the Prevention of Nuclear War (IPPNW) and former medical officer cadet said to a Jugendoffizier ("Youth officer", a public relations rank): "Every soldier is a potential murderer – you too, Mr. W. There is a drill for murder in the Bundeswehr". This prompted a long series of judicial proceedings with the accusation of Volksverhetzung ("incitement of the people"). This particular dispute ended in 1992 with a closure of the proceedings with a judgement of minor fault after the Federal Constitutional Court, in a parallel case, annulled a judgement against satirical magazine Titanic, ruling that Tucholsky's wording was protected by the constitution of Germany's article 5, paragraph 1 (freedom of speech).

Earlier acquittals by lower courts in 1987 and 1989 had caused public protest. The President of Germany, Richard von Weizsäcker, as well as Chancellor Helmut Kohl, foreign minister Hans-Dietrich Genscher, defence minister Gerhard Stoltenberg, and justice minister Klaus Kinkel criticised the court rulings publicly. The two presiding judges of the Frankfurt Landgericht received death threats, the office of the counsels for defence was destroyed by an arson attack, and the Bundestag debated whether a new law for soldier's honour protection should be introduced. Soldiers of the military watchdog group Darmstädter Signal, however, welcomed the acquittals.

After earlier similar rulings, the Federal Constitutional Court again annulled judgements against pacifists in 1995. One of the given reasons was again that the quote is directed against soldiers in general, not specifically the Bundeswehr. This led to a renewed public debate and a draft for a law protecting soldiers' honour, which however was ultimately rejected by the new government coalition in 1999.

== See also ==
- Anti-war movement
- Conscientious objector
- Counter-recruitment
- Draft evasion
- Pacifism in Germany
- Peace movement
- War resister
