= Pacifism in Germany =

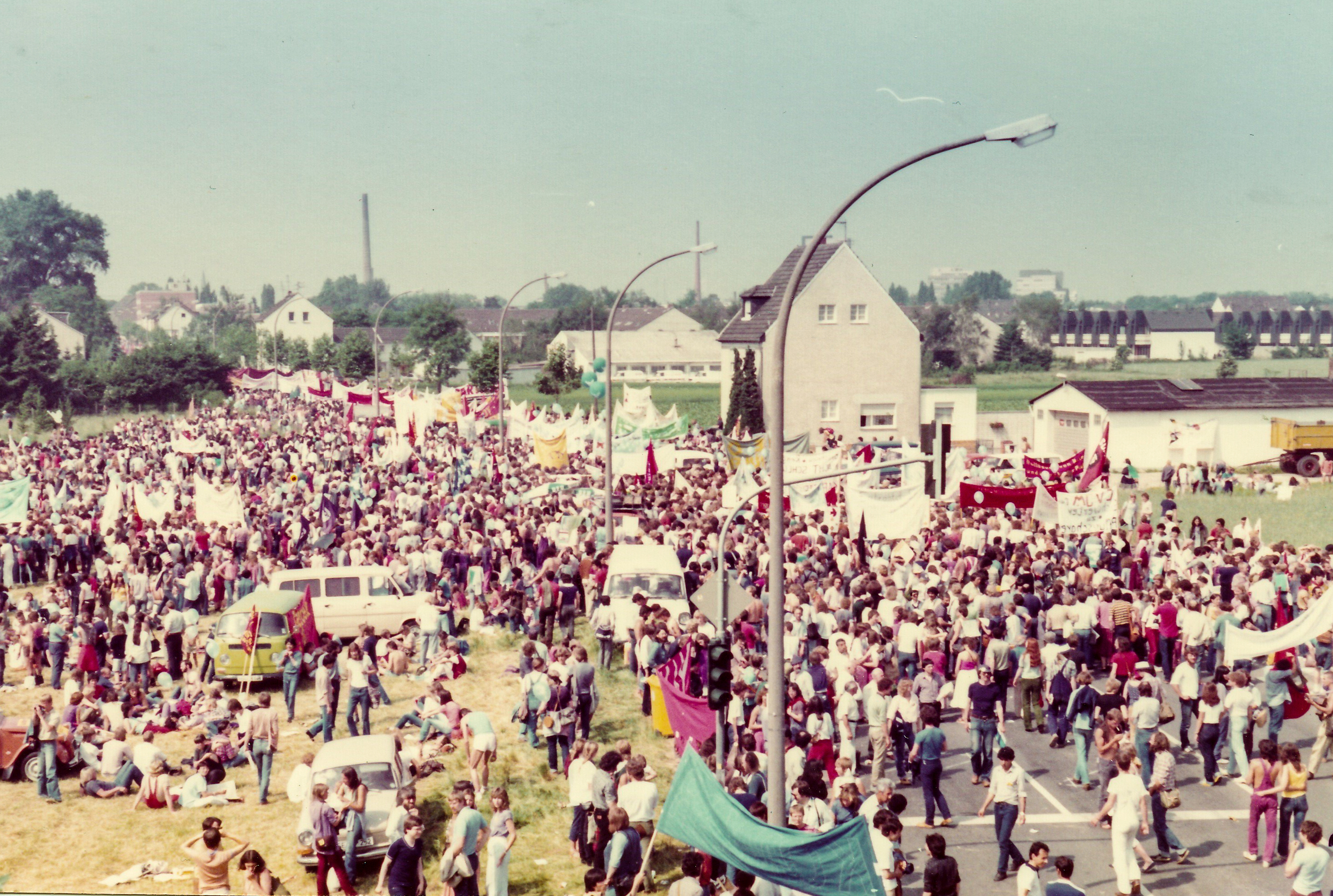
Bonn demonstration, 10 October 1981

Pacifism in Germany has been subject to significant fluctuations in influence and popular support since the country's unification. Initially a small movement in Imperial Germany, the German Peace Society, founded in 1892, struggled against a prevailing culture of militarism and expansion. Pacifism remained limited during World War I due to strong pro-war sentiment and government censorship, though women's groups notably opposed the conflict. The movement was virtually non-existent and suppressed under the Nazi regime, led by Adolf Hitler, which championed a pro-war ideology.

The main exception to this militarism was during the Cold War, with a Bonn peace demonstration having a large turnout of around 300,000 people. Christian peace groups have been the most consistently pacifistic, as an opposition to violence is a key part of the Christian faith. The size of pacifist groups in Germany, whilst remaining small, has varied throughout the history of the Federal Republic of Germany. The public's opinion regarding pacifists has also varied with historical periods.

== Historical periods ==
=== Imperial Germany (1871–1914) ===
With the unification of Germany as a single state, the country began to expand militarily as an international power, which in turn created a pacifist movement in the nation. This first movement was called the German Peace Society and was founded in 1892. However, the movement was small with only 10,000 active members at its peak, as it did not resonate with the wider population which was in favor of the German expansion. With relatively low support, the ability of the movement to grow was limited to the ability to speak freely, which was later limited due to the government declaring a state of war. The rapid military expansion of Germany was also largely popular with the population. Prior to the outbreak of war, the support of the movement began to decline as the public support of a war grew and also to avoid a response from the government.

During this time, there were two Hague Peace Conferences, which resulted in various multilateral treaties regarding military expansion and foreign policy. The conferences were also about establishing the universal values and therefore the obligations of states. In 1899, Germany participated in the Hague Peace Conference but was instrumental in blocking any meaningful disarmament proposals. At the 1907 conference, Germany was considered uncooperative, which was due to the restrictions on their ability to expand their military power.

=== World War I (1914–1918) ===
German pacifism was not as organized in this era when compared to that of Cold War Germany; however, a large number of groups adopted pacifist attitudes, which evolved throughout the war. During this period, a group of female war opponents emerged, which was a pacifist group who were opposed to the war, as it was – according to this group – caused by masculine values and attitudes. This group also overlapped with the group of advocates for women's rights during the same period, as well as the socialist movement. This activism from female groups was the result of changing cultural, political and social roles of women which had developed during the war.

Early in the war, the attitudes toward the war were very positive, which – along with the conscription of German soldiers – resulted in the pacifists’ movement remaining a relatively small group. Since the country was in a state of war, the government performed heavy censorship. This resulted in the censorship of views that directly opposed the government in pacifist publications. Because of this, they switched to addressing the wider issue of war with other countries. The government remained lenient towards those with pacifist attitudes – a reaction that comes into great contrast with that of the Nazi Government and others which enacted the concept of total war on the home front.

In 1915 at The Hague, the Women's Peace Conference met to discuss methods to end the war through negotiations. Four German delegates attended this event. After this conference, the government began to restrict pacifists and their groups as there was a consensus that this event had weakened Germany's position for negotiations. Towards the end of the war, public support massively declined, which resulted in an increase in the support for pacifist ideas. Despite this, the movement remained small in size. At this time, the government tried to assert more control over the home front in order to provide more resources for soldiers on the front line. With the Russian Revolution, the pacifist movement also gained support and inspiration through the Marxist ideology behind the revolution. During the war, literature was restricted and the literature that was promoted all displayed similar views. These supported the war effort through the justification of the war as well as the celebration of acts of heroism and sacrifice. Pacifist literature was virtually non-existent during this time period until the end of the war, when it became more widely discussed.

=== Interwar period (1918–1939) ===
K. Eckhard Kuhn-Osius notes that pro-war ideas were "bound to be appealing" for educated Germans in the face of inflation and unemployment during the Weimar Republic. Walter Flex's book Der Wanderer zwischen beiden Welten (English: The Wanderer between Two Worlds) was a pro-World War I book which promised a sense of meaning and a role in the nation's future through war, which would resonate with Germans between the end of the nineteenth century and the rise of Nazism.

=== World War II (1939–1945) ===
As a result of the Nazi Government's suppression of movements which opposed their regime, the existence of pacifists in Germany was at its lowest and least organized during this period of time. During it, pacifists were mostly individuals who, rather than necessarily being part of a formalized group, acted out the ideology of pacifism. A key reason for this was the continued support of the war effort as well as public support for Adolf Hitler remaining high throughout the war. The atrocities of the Second World War inspired the pacifist movement after the end of the war.

=== Cold War (1945–1990) ===
The pacifist movement reached its highest popularity in the Cold War era. This is evidenced by the fact that a peace protest against the production of nuclear weapons and the militarism of the NATO alliance system occurred in the city of Bonn in 1981. The reason for the popularity was the outcomes of the First and Second World Wars, as the significant loss of lives shifted the attitudes around militarism in Germany.

Another key issue which was protested was the ability of the United States government to use West German weapons without consulting the West German government. The protest was attended by approximately 300,000 people, which was a significant number for a pacifist event in West Germany, contrasting greatly with the historical size of the pacifist movements. This event consisted of 700 individual groups which protested together with the common link of the pacifist ideology.

Another factor which influenced the size of the Bonn demonstration was the NATO plan to introduce intermediate-range theatre nuclear forces (INF) into Germany as a part of their military arsenal. This debate was a prominent part of West German discourse during 1957 and 1958. The main concerns around the policy were the implications for domestic and international responsibilities as a nuclear state. The Social Democratic Party of Germany (SPD) initially opposed this proposition; however, they made a concession to introduce a military without nuclear capabilities. In the following election, the SPD lost to the Christian Democrats, resulting in the SPD reforming their party and their ideology. The part ideology after the reform, resembled Marxism as pacifism became an integral part of the party.

West Germany had a much greater presence of pacifists than East Germany. Christian-moral ethics were the driver of the movement; however, not all pacifists were Christian. While these Christian movements and groups have historically been the only consistent pacifists, this era saw the rise in pacifists not belonging to the Christian faith. From the 1960s, there was a significant increase in student protests as part of the pacifist movement. Unions were also another group which became heavily involved in pacifism during this time. Even during its most popular stage, pacifism was not a characteristic of either political wing. The policy of disarmament was also a heavily discussed policy at the time, with the pacifist movement advocating for the adoption of this policy.

=== Contemporary Germany (1990–present) ===
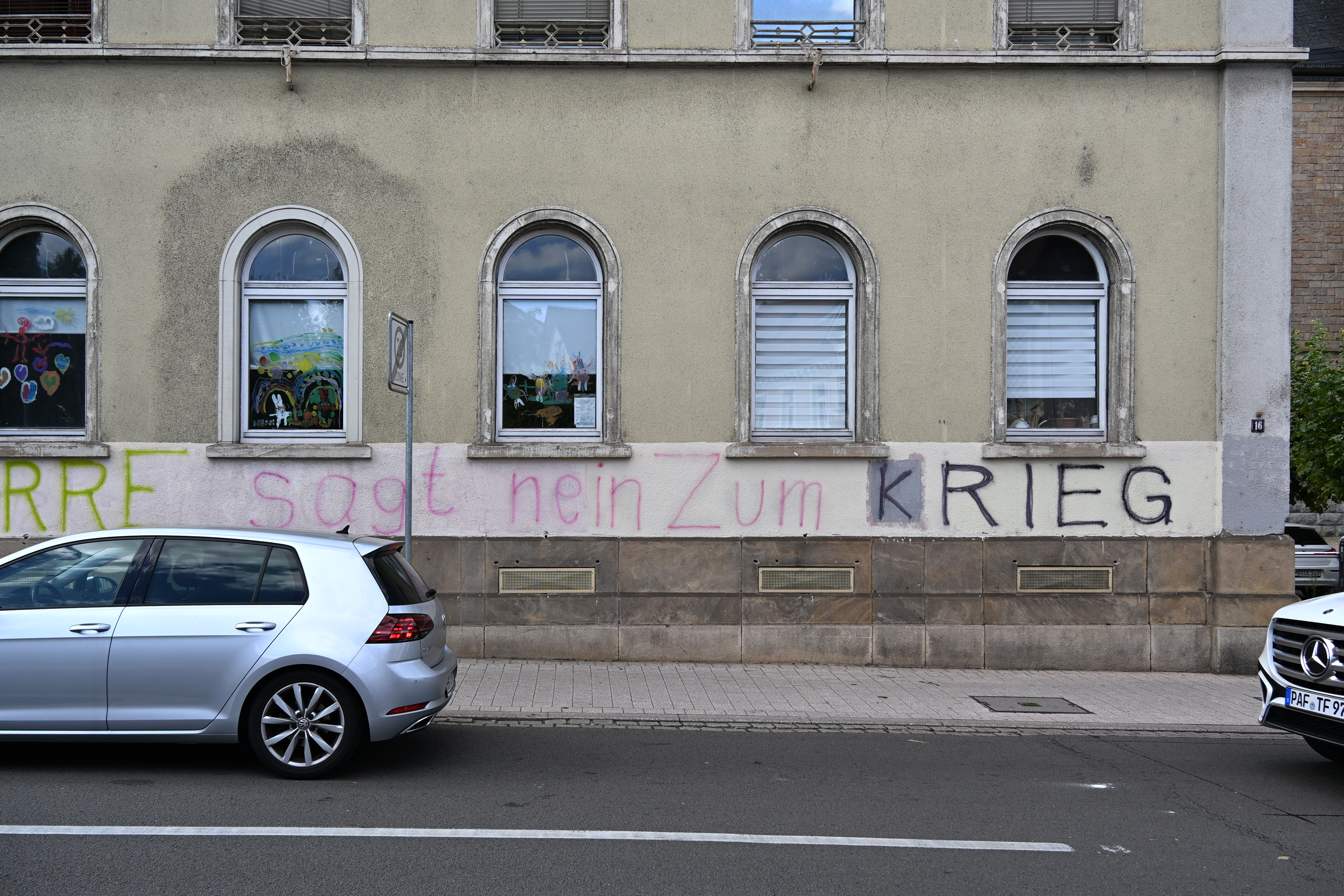
Anti-war sentiment in graffiti, in Speyer in 2025.

The foreign policy of contemporary Germany has been more pacifist than those of the previous historical eras. This is driven primarily by the history of Germany during the First and Second World Wars, as there was a significant loss of lives as a result of the perception of pacifism by the wider population. The use of force rarely occurs unless there is a need for humanitarian intervention, which is derived from the United Nations principle of collective security.

One example of the government use of pacifism is demonstrated in their response to the United States’ declaration of war on Iraq, as they were the first allied nation to condemn the decision and decide against participating in the war. This damaged bi-lateral relations between the nations and was a significant moment for modern German foreign policy and its reliance on pacifism. There was no bi-partisan support for pacifism as it was primarily linked to the left-wing parties, the SPD and The Greens. The German government also abstained from participating in Kosovo War which was another war in which NATO participated without German military support.

After the Rwandan Genocide and the Bosnian War, the left-wing German parties allowed for military intervention on the basis of humanitarian reasons, while their right-wing counterparts believed in the strategic use of force for foreign policy. The NATO intervention during the later stages of the Yugoslav Wars demonstrated this movement towards military intervention on the basis of humanitarian reasons. This was voted on by the two major left-wing parties the SPD and The Greens, who voted 75% and 50% in favour of the humanitarian intervention.

The use of pacifism has changed as the major German political parties’ ideologies and positions change over time. During the 1990s there was limited agreement on whether the German government should oppose the use of force. However, from the early 2000s, the left-leaning parties have evolved to adopt policies of pacifism and an opposition to participating in the war, while the right-wing Christian-Democratic party has adopted a policy stating that Germany should be capable of defending itself through the use of military force. During this same era, Germany has consolidated its economic and political power over Europe, making the impact of their foreign policy significant.

William Cook argued in 2014 that the atrocities of Nazism had left Germany with an aversion to direct military force, though they would still provide financial and logistical support during events such as the Gulf War. However, the long-standing pacifist stance was challenged by the annexation of Crimea by Russia, as well as the Islamic State. Angela Merkel pushed for firmer sanctions against Russia, while Frank-Walter Steinmeier pledged to fund arms and training for Kurdish forces fighting ISIS in Iraq. Steinmeier advocated for "a more active foreign policy from Germany", though he rejected "military solutions" for Crimea in favor of negotiations.

== See also ==
- Das Andere Deutschland
- Friedensbund der Kriegsteilnehmer
- German Catholics' Peace Association
- German resistance to Nazism
- Graswurzelrevolution
- Soldiers are murderers
- West German student movement
