= Priess =

Priess is a surname. Notable people with the surname include:

- Ashley Priess (born 1990), American artistic gymnast
- Helmuth Prieß (1939–2012), German activist
- Helmuth Prieß (Wehrmacht general) (1896–1944), German military officer
- Hermann Priess (1901–1985), German military officer
- Marie Priess (1885–1983), German politician

== See also ==
- Preiss, surname
