= Kurt D. Singer =

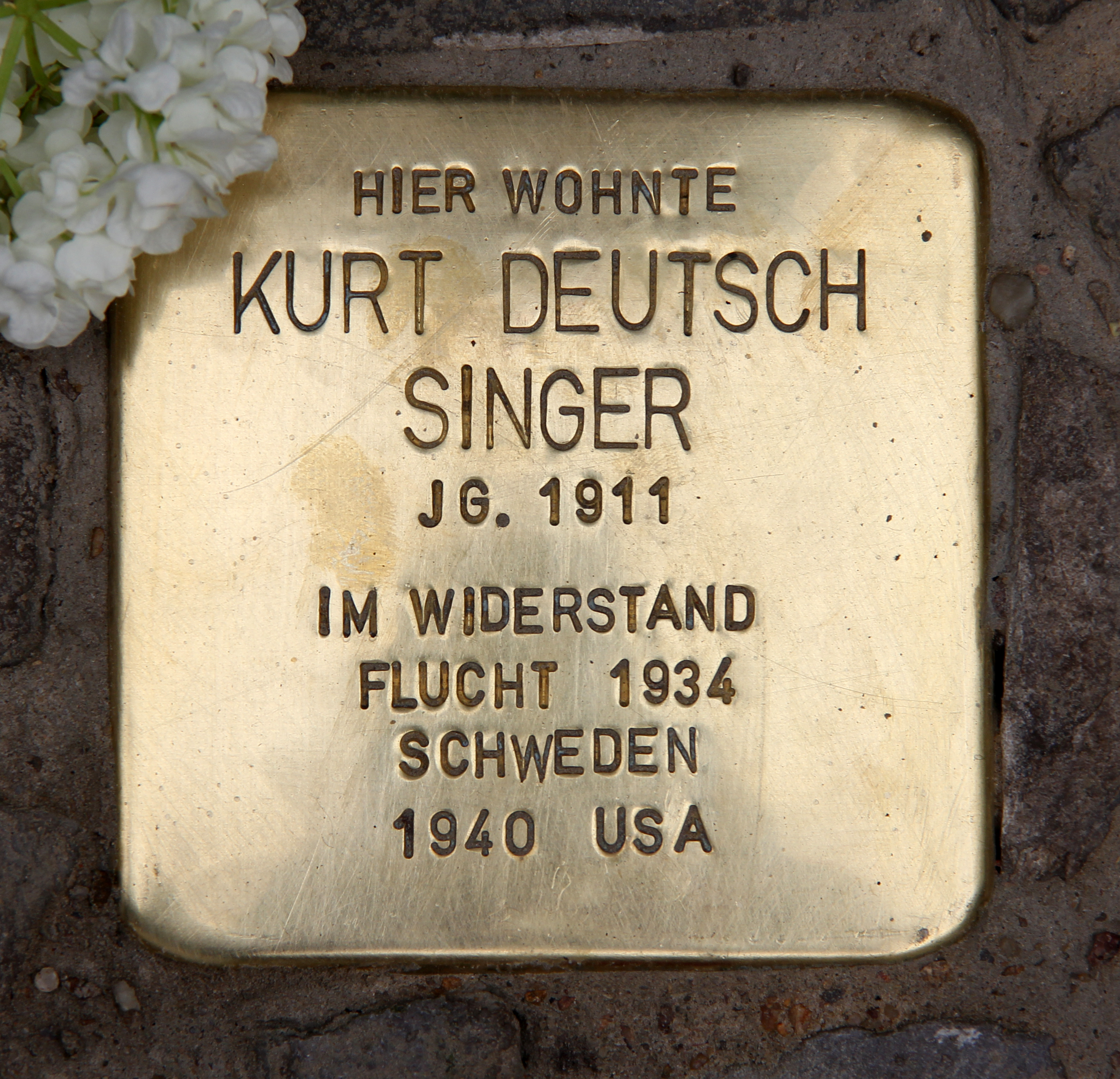
Marker for Kurt Deutsch Singer's residence at Jenaer Straße 9, Berlin-Wilmersdorf, Germany

Kurt D. Singer (1911–2005) was an Austrian spy and prolific biographer and writer on subjects ranging from espionage to Nazi leader Hermann Goering and actor Danny Kaye.

== Background ==
Kurt Deutsch Singer was born Kurt Deutsch on August 10, 1911, in Vienna, Austria, and raised in Berlin, Germany. At some time, he took his mother's maiden name Singer as his surname. He studied at the University of Zurich and Labor College (Stockholm).

== Career ==
In 1933, Singer began publishing an anti-Nazi underground weekly, Mitteilungsblätter. That led to his flight to Stockholm, where he worked for Swedish and Swiss publications while attending university. There, he also served as a spy for the Allies on Soviet and Nazi activities in Scandinavia. His 1940 biography of Goering led Sweden to bow to Nazi pressure and ban the book, which led Singer to emigrate to the USA.

In 1951, Singer became a US citizen and earned a doctorate from the Divinity College of Metaphysics in Indianapolis. In 1955, he founded Singer Communications, Inc., a syndicated news service, in Anaheim, California.

== Personal life and death ==
Singer married three times to: Hilde Tradelius, Jane Sherrod, and Katherine Singer He had a son and daughter and two grandchildren.

Kurt Deutsch Singer died age 94 on 9 December 2005 in Santa Barbara, California.

== Legacy ==
In addition to his written works (below), Singer donated his collection of historical works to the Special Collections Archives at Boston University.

== Works ==
(All books with dates appear in the catalog of the US Library of Congress.)

Europe:

- Europas diktatorer; 24 diktatorer från Hitler till Stalin (Swedish) (1936)
- Carl von Ossietzky (1937)
- Martin Niemöller, prästen i koncentrationslägret (Swedish) (1939)
- Goering: Germany's Most Dangerous Man (1940)
- White book of the Church of Norway on its persecution by the German occupation forces and the Quisling regime in Norway (1941)
- Germany's secret service in South America (1941)
- Duel for the Northland: The War of Enemy Agents in Scandinavia (1943)
- The riddle of Sweden's ballbearings (1944)
- Arctic invasion, the battle of Iceland, Greenland, Spitzbergen and northern Finland (1944)

Espionage:

- Spies and Saboteurs in Argentina (1942)
- Japan's secret service in the Hawaiian islands (1944)
- The revival of the Nazi bund in the United States of America (1945)
- Spies and traitors of World War II (1945)
- Communist agents in America; a who's who of American communists, 1947 (1947)
- Three thousand years of espionage (editor) (1948)
- The World's 30 Greatest Women Spies (1951)
- Gentlemen Spies (1952)
- Spies and traitors: a short history of espionage (1953)
- The men in the Trojan horse (1953)
- The world's best spy stories: fact and fiction (1954)
- Spy stories from Asia (1955)
- Spy Omnibus (1959)
- Spies who changed history (editor) (1960)
- Spies and Traitors of World War II
- Three Thousand Years of Espionage
- The World's Best Spy Stories

Crime:

- My Greatest Crime Story, by Police Chiefs of the World (1956)
- My Strangest Case, by Police Chiefs of the World (1957)
- Crime Omnibus (1961)

Biography:

- The Laughton story; an intimate story of Charles Laughton (1954)
- The Danny Kaye Story (1958)
- Hemingway; life and death of a giant (1961)
- Dr. Albert Schweitzer, medical missionary (with Jane Sherrod) (1962)
- Lyndon Baines Johnson, man of reason (with Jane Sherrod) (1964)
- Mata Hari (1967)

Children's Books (with Jane Sherrod):

- Spies for Democracy (1960)
- Great Adventures of the Sea (1962)
- Great adventures in crime (1962)
- Folk Tales of Mexico (1969)
- They are possessed : masterpieces of exorcism (1976)
- Ghost Book

Supernatural:

- Kurt Singer's Ghost omnibus (1965)
- I Can't Sleep at Night: 13 Weird Tales (1966)
- Weird tales of the supernatural (1966)
- Tales from the Unknown (1970)
- The house in the valley: and other tales of terror (editor) (1970)
- Satanic omnibus (editor) (1973)
- Kurt Singer's Gothic horror book (1974)
- Plague of the Unknown
- Ghouls and Ghosts
