= Rosalinde von Ossietzky-Palm =

German-Swedish activist

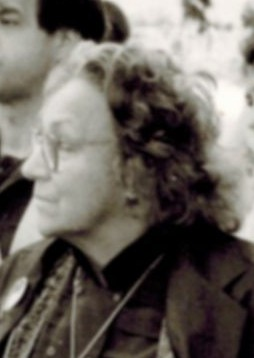
- Rosalinde von Ossietzky-Palm in 1988
- Born: 21 December 1919; Berlin, Weimar Germany
- Died: 7 February 2000 (aged 80); Stockholm, Sweden
- Occupations: German-Swedish pacifist and social worker

Rosalinde von Ossietzky-Palm, also Rosalinda (1919–2000) was a German-Swedish pacifist and social worker. Born in Berlin, after the arrest of her father, the peace activist Carl von Ossietzky, in order to protect her from the Nazis her British-born mother sent her to England in 1933 and she later moved to Sweden. For many years, she attempted to restore her father's reputation in Germany, succeeding in 1991 to help the University of Oldenburg adopt the name "Carl von Ossietzky Universität Oldenburg". In 1990, von Ossietzky-Palm called on the German courts to rehabilitate her father, who had received the 1935 Nobel Peace Prize. Even on appeal in 1992, the case was refused.

== Biography ==
Born on 21 December 1919 in Berlin, Rosalinde von Ossientzky was the daughter of the pacifist Carl von Ossietzky and his British-born wife Maud née Lichfield-Woods. After her father was arrested in 1933, in order to protect her from the Nazis, her mother arranged for her to be sent to a Quaker boarding school in England where she was trained as a dancer. When funding for the school ran out, thanks to the assistance of Kurt D. Singer, she was moved to a family in Sweden. Immediately after her father had been awarded the Nobel Peace Prize in 1936, she was able to speak to him by telephone until the Gestapo cut off the call. She spoke to him by telephone once more in January 1937. In Sweden she was trained as a social worker. Her second marriage was with the journalist Björn Palm, with whom she had a son, the painter Ebbe Palm.

She served as a social worker in Stockholm for almost two decades until her retirement, caring for indigenous migrants from the north of Sweden, drug and drink addicts and other desperate individuals. She is remembered as a pioneer of night patrols in central Stockholm and as the instigator of the first Swedish telephone helpline. In an article commemorating her on her 75th birthday, the newspaper Dagens Nyheter called her work "legendary".

In parallel with her social work, Ossietsky-Palm worked tirelessly to restore the image of her father, despite the treatment he was receiving in post-war West Germany. By contrast, she found no such sentiments in East Berlin when she visited the newspaper Die Weltbühne which her mother Maud had re-established in 1946. In the 1930s, the paper had been edited by her father Carl von Ossietzky who was arrested for an article he had written about German re-armament. In October 1989, in connection with the unveiling by Die Weltbühne of the memorial plaque to Carl von Ossietzky on Rosenhaler Straße in East Berlin, Ossietzky-Palm was honoured as the first recipient of the Carl-von-Ossietzky-Friedenspreis (Carl von Ossietzky Peace Prize).

From the 1970s, Ossietzky-Palm became increasingly associated with the University of Oldenburg in its attempt to adopt the name "Carl von Ossietzky Universität Oldenburg". Indeed, politicians from Lower Saxony had fought against the university's recognition of Carl von Ossietzky but thanks to Ossietzky-Palm's assistance, the new name was finally adopted. In an obituary to Ossietzky-Palm, the university's president Siegfried Grubitzsch stated that no one else had fought more strongly to restore interest in the great democrat. In 1981, she had transferred her father's estate to the university, thereby enabling the publication of the Ossietzky-Gesamtausgabe (Ossietzky Complete Edition). As a result, in 1991 the university senate named her the institution's first honorary citizen. She last visited the university in 1999 in connection with its 25th anniversary.

Ossietzky-Palm was less successful in her attempt to have the 1931 case against her father re-opened. At the time he had been convicted of revealing military secrets. He served eight months in prison but was then arrested by the Nazis in connection with the Reichstag fire in February 1933. Despite being awarded the Nobel Peace Prize in 1936, he died in police custody in May 1938. In 1990, Ossietzky-Palm applied to the Berlin Court of Appeal to have the case re-opened, but was unsuccessful as it was deemed there was no new evidence. In December 1992, she tried once more, but was informed by the Bundesgerichtshof that conviction in 1931 for the betrayal of military secrets could not in 1992 be considered a case in connection with democratic duty.

Rosalinde von Ossietzky-Palm died in Stockholm on 7 February 2000.
