= German Peace Society =

German association

Organization logo

The German Peace Society (German: Deutsche Friedensgesellschaft (DFG)) was founded in 1892 in Berlin. In 1900 it moved its headquarters to Stuttgart. It still exists and is known as the Deutsche Friedensgesellschaft - Vereinigte KriegsdienstgegnerInnen (DFG-VK; German Peace Society - United War Resisters). It is an organisation consisting of political pacifists and war resisters. About four to six times a year, the DFG-VK is publishing its magazine Zivilcourage.

The DFG-VK is participating in a variety of pacifist and antimilitarist alliances on a national as well as international level and is the biggest member organisation of War Resisters’ International.

== History ==
On 21 December 1892, the German Peace Society was founded, claiming to be the first organisation of pacifists that represents the whole German empire. Responsible for the procedure were Alfred Hermann Fried and Bertha von Suttner, one of the most known German women of that time.

The German Peace Society was a key part of the German peace movement and played a prominent role since the mid-1890s. This was the result of growing international tensions and the rearmament of many nations that wanted to show their strength in the international race of imperialism. The German Peace Society protested against imperialism, militarism, the discrimination of minorities and the chauvinist upbringing of young people. In 1899, the German Peace Society moved their headquarters to Stuttgart. In the beginning of the 20th century, one of the most important members to this day was Ludwig Quidde, who was regularly leading the German delegation to the International Peace Congress and kept maintaining contact to other peace organisations worldwide.

In 1902, the German Peace Society counted 6.000 members in 60 local groups. Until May 1914, the number of members grew to 10.000 in almost 100 local groups. Although many of the leading members were part of the upper class, the actual base of members was deriving from a lower middle class background like small business owners, intellectuals as well as doctors, lawyers and pharmacists. However, public servants, workers or farmers were almost non-existent in the German Peace Society. In May 1914, the first women’s initiative inside the Society was established.

After the beginning of the First World War, members started to go into exile or were hiding from publicity to avoid oppression of any kind due to a general disaffirmation towards a pacifist agitation.

With the end of the First World War, the German Peace Society gained popularity amongst social democrats. However, due to the existing Stab-in-the-back myth, pacifists were also under attack and made responsible for the German loss of the war. Despite this circumstance, the number of members rose to about 30.000 by 1927. The high number in members also caused conflicts within the Society and its future path. This concerns mainly the direction of a traditional upper class pacifism (which also partly supports defensive wars) and a newly rising, more radical pacifism carried out by works and members of the lower classes which in the end, enforced their radical ideas and ended with the withdrawal of eleven board members and the new elected head Paul von Schoenaich.

In 1933, after the takeover by the NSDAP, the German Peace Society was one of the targets of the initial crackdown on opposition. Leading members were imprisoned, killed or fled into exile. Its mouthpiece newspaper, Das Andere Deutschland, was closed down shortly after the Reichstag Fire Decree was issued. Although the paper was initially suspended for three months, Nazi repression kept it closed for the remainder of the Nazi era.

After the Second World War, the German Peace Society was re-founded in 1946. Until 1948, it regained over 10.000 members.

During the Cold War, the Society had several setbacks to suffer. This included the loss of many members, the still forbidden status in the Soviet occupied territory in Germany and the rumours of being infiltrated by communists. Still, the Society played an important role on topics like the rearmament of Germany and the German "Easter Protests”. In the 1950s, the main topics of the German Peace Society were peaceful co-existence, the disarmament of East and West and the practice of war objectors which was also part of a big campaign in 1972.

After the successful unification with the former International of War Resisters (IdK; Internationale der Kriegsdienstgegner) to form the DFG/Idk (West-Berlin excluded) in 1968 and the fusion with the organisation United War Resisters (VK; Verband der Kriegsdienstverweigerer ) five years later, the organisation was now working under the name Deutsche Friedensgesellschaft - Vereinigte KriegsdienstgegnerInnen (DFG-VK; German Peace Society - United War Resisters).

== Campaigns ==
The German Peace Society is a member of several international initiatives and alliances such as War Resisters' International, International Peace Bureau, European Bureau for Conscientious Objection, and the International Campaign to Abolish Nuclear Weapons.

After the end of compulsory military service, the Society focused on the protest against advertisement for military service, especially in front of universities, schools, job markets or their yearly upcoming Tag der Bundeswehr (day of Bundeswehr). The Society advocates against a reactivation of the military service and the protection of minors that are recruited by the Bundeswehr.

In 2011, the Society founded a campaign against the delivery of weapons to states that fail to meet certain standards of human rights and international law. One of the main representatives of this campaign is Jürgen Grässlin who is also part of the board of the German Peace Society.

=== Bertha-von-Suttner-Foundation ===
Named after the founder of the German Peace Society, the Bertha-von-Suttner-Foundation supports scientific events and research programs as well as scientific publications and media that is supporting the idea of international cooperation, communication and peace. Head of the foundation is David Scheuing, who is also editorial journalist of the magazine Wissenschaft & Frieden.

=== Carl-von-Ossietzky-Fonds ===
The Carl-von-Ossietzky-Fonds is a fund to support activists that came into conflict with the law through peace and anti-war activities. It helps to cover possible costs of a conviction and corresponding fees. It is named after the former secretary of the German Peace Society Carl von Ossietzky.

== See also ==
- Das Andere Deutschland, a publication of the German Peace Society.
- List of anti-war organizations
