= Maud von Ossietzky =

- Born: 12 December 1888; Hyderabad, British India
- Died: 12 May 1974 (aged 85); East Berlin, East Germany
- Occupations: suffragette, political activist
- Spouse: Carl von Ossietzky (German)
- Children: Rosalinde von Ossietzky-Palm

Maud Hester von Ossietzky (née Lichfield-Woods; 12 December 1888, Hyderabad – 12 May 1974, Berlin) was a suffragette and the wife of German journalist and Nobel Peace Prize winner Carl von Ossietzky.

She was born in Hyderabad, India, to a British colonial officer and the descendant of an Indian princess. Despite her Indian heritage, she is almost always referred to as an "Englishwoman."

She was active in the British suffragette movement in her youth.

== Life with Carl von Ossietzky ==
In Hamburg (or perhaps Fairhaven, England) on 19 August 1913, she married Carl von Ossietzky, a pacifist and later a writer for and editor-in-chief of the leftist German weekly Die Weltbühne (The World Stage). The couple met in 1912 in Hamburg, but little is known about their early life together. It seems that her wealthy family opposed the marriage. Early in their marriage, she paid a fine on his behalf after he published an anti-war article. Surviving letters attest to Carl's devotion to his wife. While Carl served in World War I, he wrote Maud a letter that described her as an igniting force in his life: "You are the magnet that first touched the rigid iron." In 1922, he wrote to her that he "blessed the fate that sent her."

Their daughter Rosalinde was born on 21 December 1919.

While Carl worked as a writer and political activist, Maud organized lectures for him. In 1931, Carl von Ossietzky was imprisoned for "treason and espionage" because of his role in publishing details of German remilitarization; he was released in 1932.

After the Reichstag Fire in April 1933, von Ossietzky wanted to flee Germany, but her husband chose to remain. He was quickly arrested by the Gestapo and imprisoned in a series of prisons and concentration camps. Whether she was a supportive wife or incapable of helping her husband, neither she nor her husband's famous international friends could release him from Nazi concentration camps.

In 1936, Carl von Ossietzky contracted tuberculosis and was moved to a hospital in Berlin. He was awarded the 1935 Nobel Peace Prize during this period, though his sickness did not allow him to accept it in person. His wife nursed him until he died on 4 May 1938. Carl von Ossietzky was buried in a municipal cemetery, and Maud spent the next years fighting to move his body to a cemetery in the Berlin neighborhood of Pankow.

Maud spent time in a psychiatric clinic after his death. One author has claimed that the Gestapo ordered her to stop using her late husband's name and lived as "Maud Woods."

She invested the money awarded with her husband's Nobel Peace Prize with lawyer Kurt Wannow, but Wannow embezzled the sum in 1937.

== Historical inconsistencies ==
Many sources state that by the time the Nazis imprisoned her husband, von Ossietzky was an alcoholic, with one writing that her alcoholism "caused [her husband] great pain ... but may have protected her from retribution under the Nazis." Others have claimed that her husband's death caused her alcoholism. Their daughter blamed Die Weltbühne for her mother's (unspecified) "illness."

During World War II, Rosalinde was sent to a Quaker boarding school in England through the support of Ernst Toller and the Quakers. Another source claims that Maud and Rosalinde emigrated to Sweden via England, though there are no other sources that place Maud in Sweden. A third source states that Maud remained in Berlin when Rosalinde traveled from England to Sweden. Rosalinde died in Sweden in 2000.

German sources tend to ascribe Maud a more positive and active role, while English-language scholarship often describes her in less complimentary terms.

== Later life ==
On 1 June 1946, Die Weltbühne reappeared in the Soviet sector of Berlin with Maud von Ossietzky and Hans Leonard listed as editors. Leonard, her neighbor, had a career in publishing ended by Nazi anti-semitic discrimination. Maud von Ossietzky and Leonard revived a Weimar-era publication that endures to this day.

In 1966, she published her memoir, Maud von Ossietzky erzählt: ein Lebensbild (Maud von Ossietzky Explains: a Life Story). Historians were divided in their opinion: Wolfgang Schivelbusch referred to the book as "admittedly unreliable," while István Deák found it "charming and straightforward."

Maud von Ossietzky died in 1974 in Berlin and is buried next to her husband in Pankow.
