= Esterwegen concentration camp =

Nazi concentration camp

Coordinates: 53°00′29″N 7°38′23″E

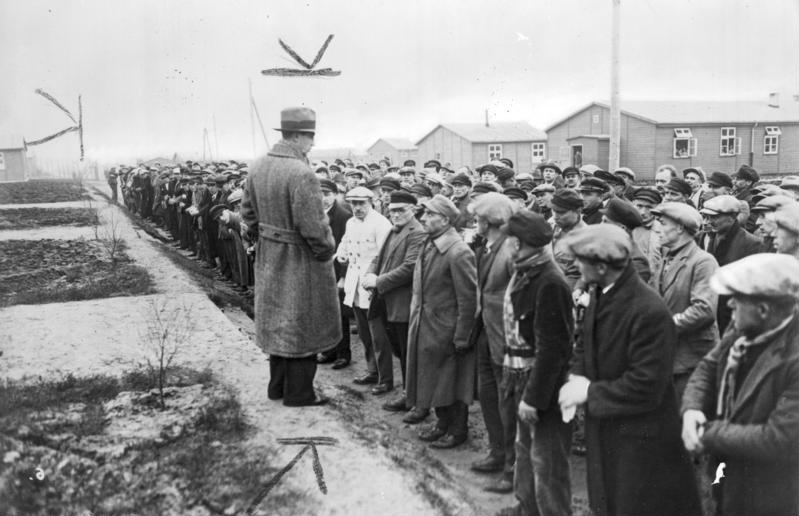
Rudolf Diels of the Prussian Ministry of the Interior addressing inmates in KZ Esterwegen, 1933. (Glyphs resembling inverted letters K are crop marks, indicating that the photo was used in a publication.)

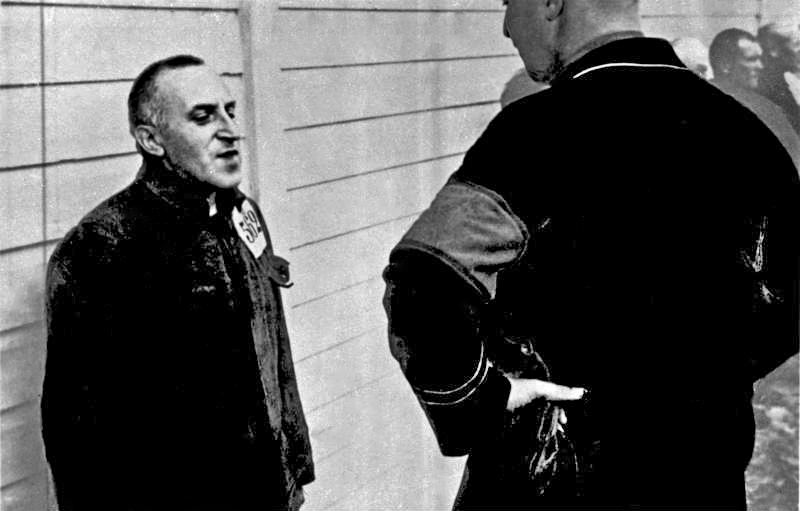
Carl von Ossietzky in Esterwegen concentration camp, 1934

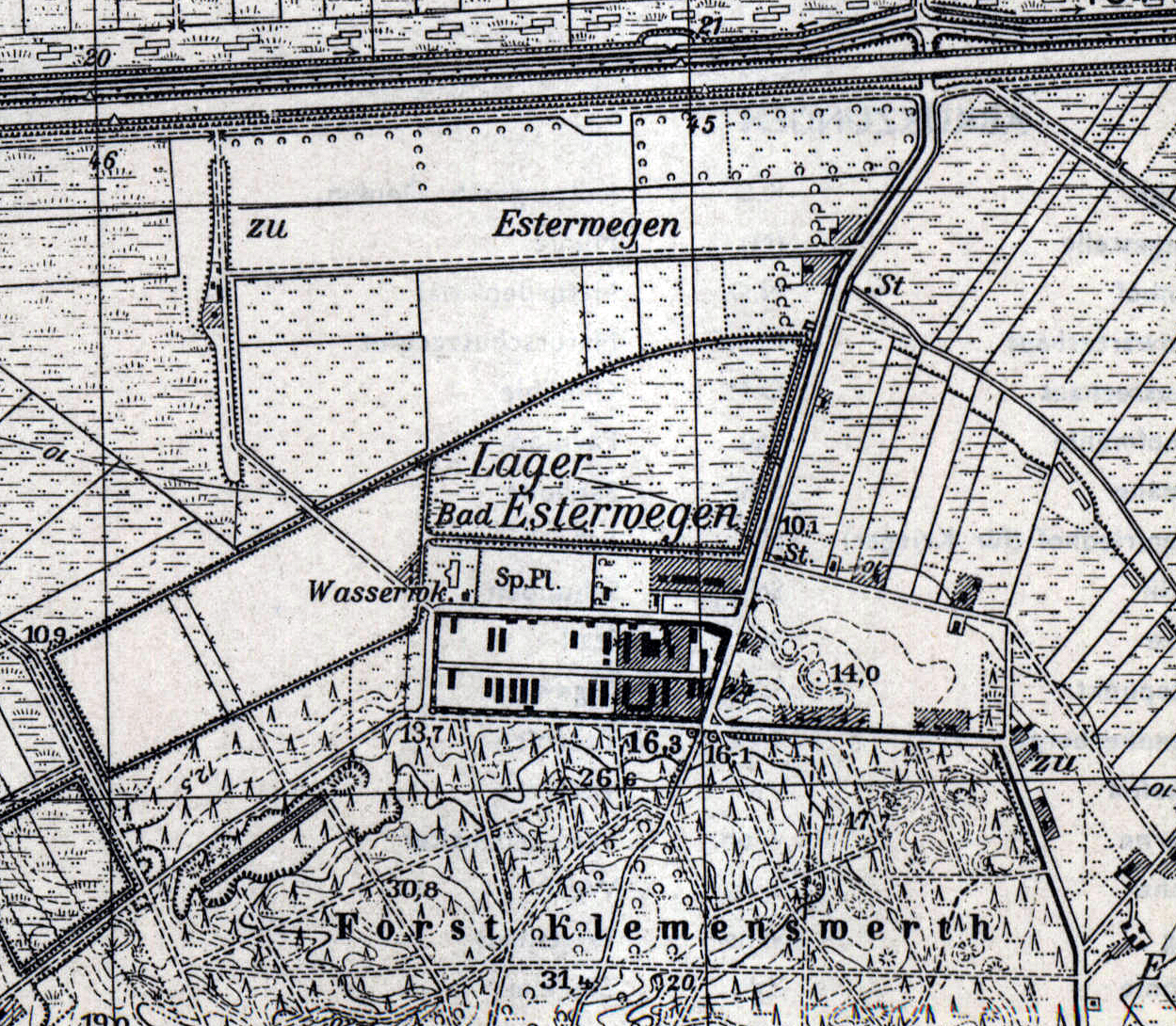
Map of the camp from 1955

The Esterwegen concentration camp near Esterwegen was an early Nazi concentration camp within a series of camps first established in the Emsland district of Germany. It was established in the summer of 1933 as a concentration camp for 2000 so-called political Schutzhäftlinge (protective custody prisoners) and was for a time the second largest concentration camp after Dachau. The camp was closed in summer of 1936. Thereafter, until 1945 it was used as a prison camp. Political prisoners and so-called Nacht und Nebel prisoners were also held there. After the war ended, Esterwegen served as a British internment camp, as a prison, and, until 2000, as a depot for the German Army.

The most famous prisoner was writer and editor of the weekly magazine, Die Weltbühne, Carl von Ossietzky, who won the Nobel Peace Prize in 1935. Comedian Werner Finck was detained in Esterwegen for six weeks.

SS-Hauptscharführer Gustav Sorge, nicknamed "The Iron Gustav" for his brutality, was a guard at Esterwegen prior to being assigned to Sachsenhausen. He was convicted of war crimes after the war.

== Gallery ==
Memory on the Esterwegen concentration camp

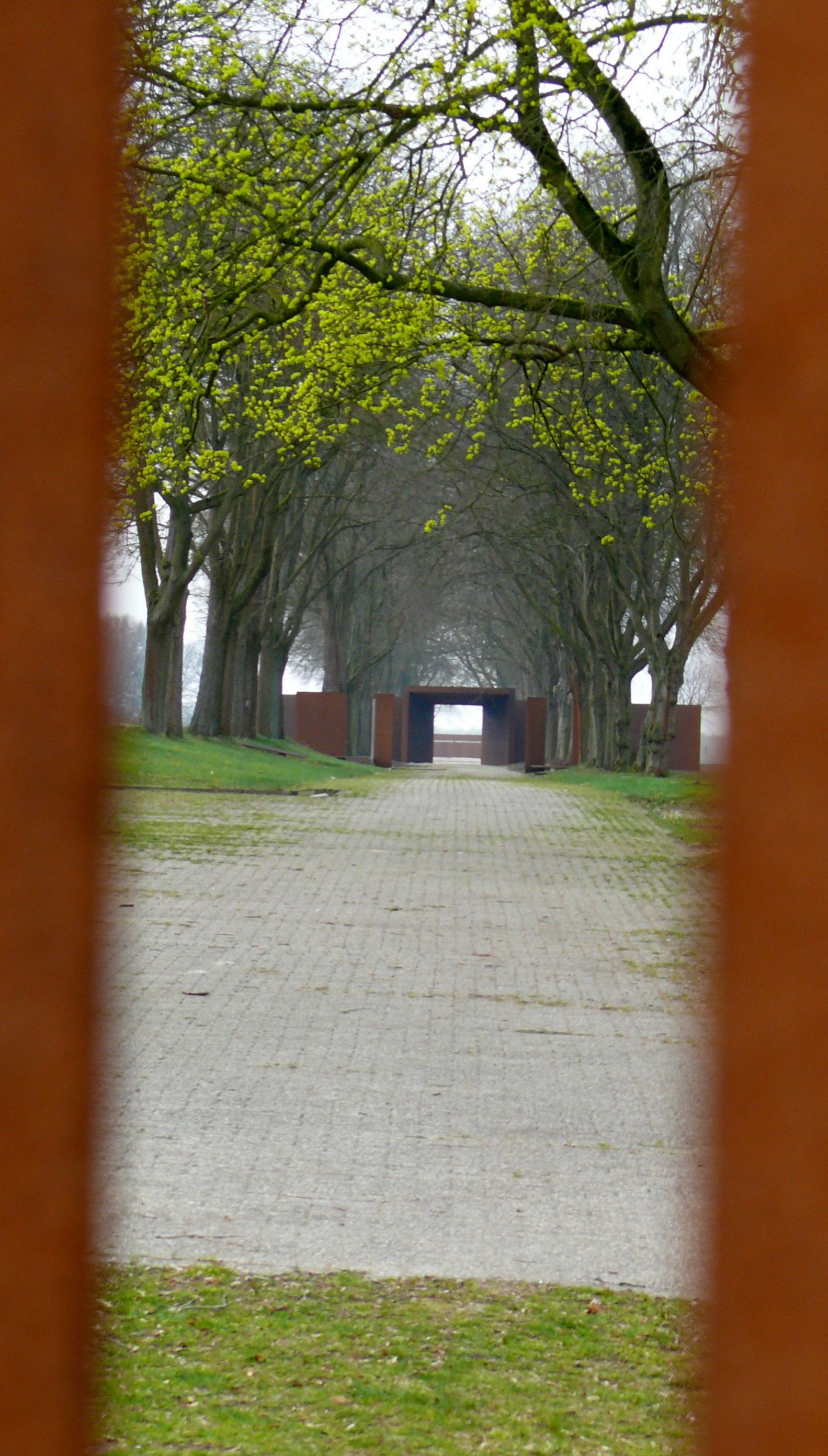
Looking through a narrow gap from the site of the former front gate on to the former Camp Road

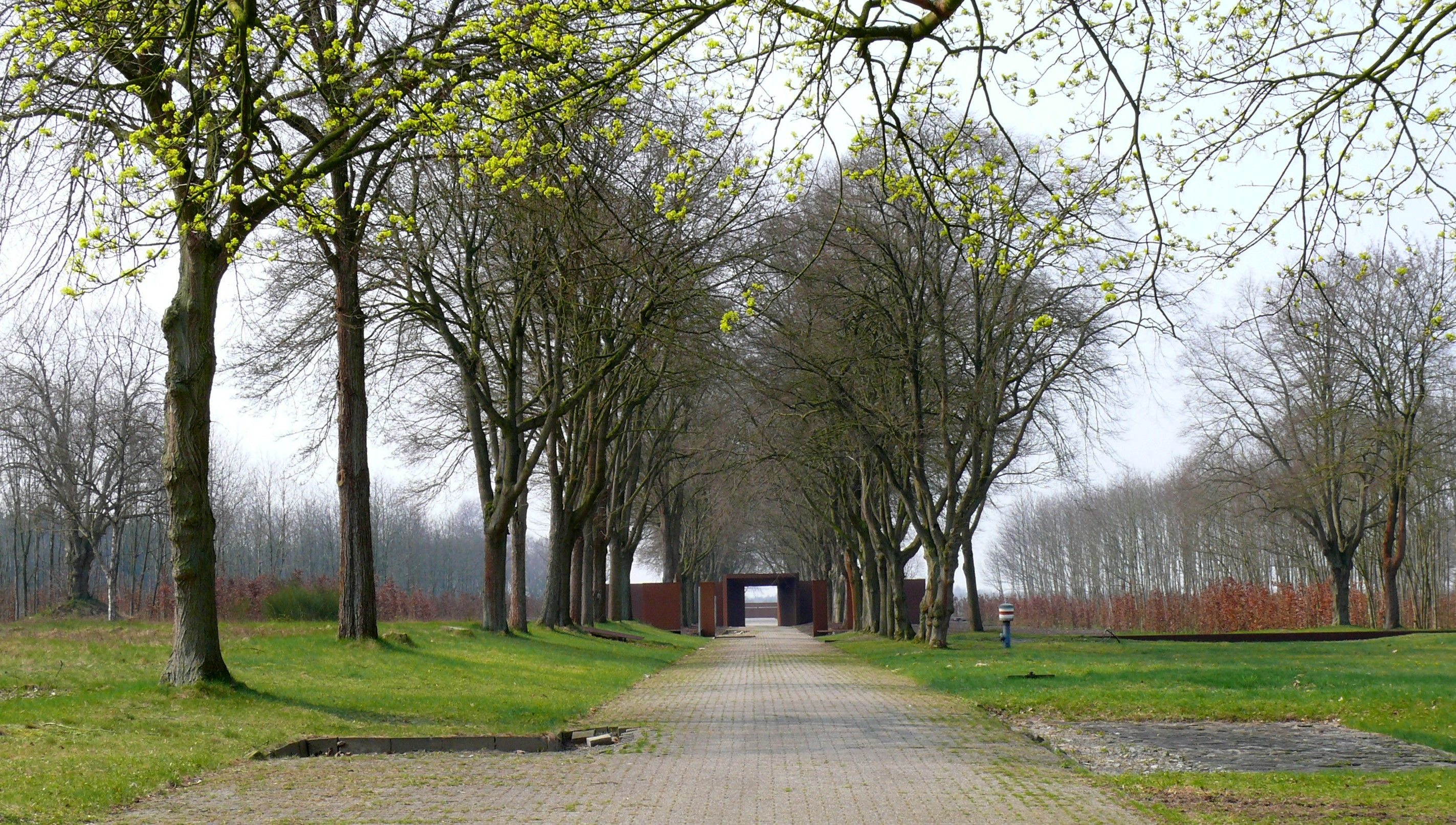
View across the camp road from the main gate

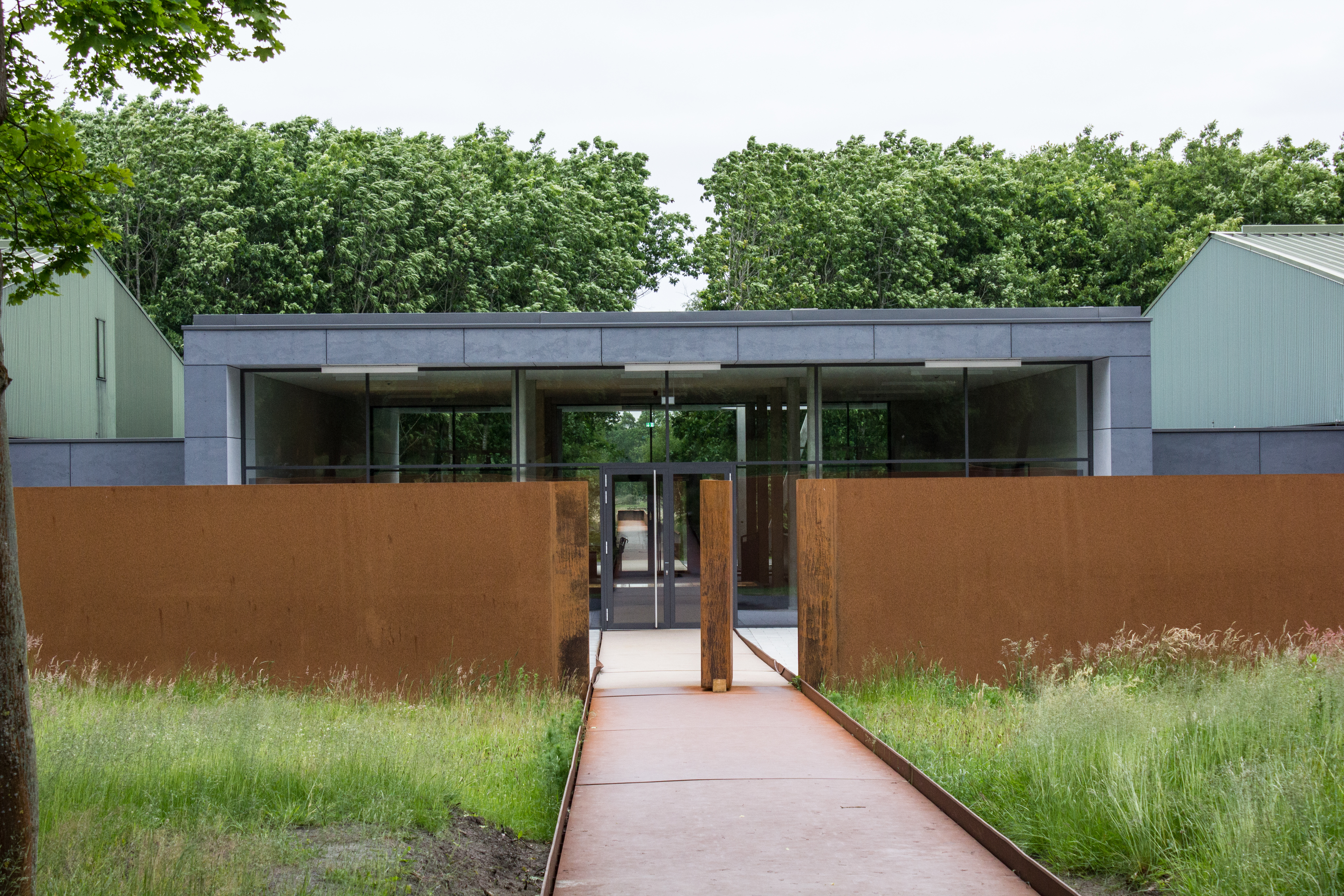
The way out of the camp to the bog through the building of the memorial

== See also ==
- Glossary of Nazi Germany
- The Holocaust
- List of concentration and internment camps
- List of Nazi concentration camps
- Nazi concentration camps
- Nazi Party
- World War II

== Literature ==
- Kurt Buck: Esterwegen – Das Lager. In: Bettina Schmidt-Czaia (Hrsg. im Auftrag der Gemeinde Esterwegen): Esterwegen 1223 bis 1999 – "Moor und Heide nur ringsum ...?" Esterwegen 1999, S. 205–253.
- Kurt Buck: Auf der Suche nach den Moorsoldaten. Emslandlager 1933–1945 und die historischen Orte heute. 6. Auflage. Papenburg 2008, ISBN 978-3-926277-16-9.
- Bernd Faulenbach, Andrea Kaltofen (Hg.): 'Hölle im Moor'. Die Emslandlager 1933–1945. Wallstein, Göttingen 2017, ISBN 978-3-8353-3137-2.
- Henning Harpel: Die Emslandlager des Dritten Reichs. Formen und Probleme der aktiven Geschichtserinnerung im nördlichen Emsland 1955–1993. In: Studiengesellschaft für Emsländische Regionalgeschichte (Hrsg.): Emsländische Geschichte. Band 12. Haselünne 2005, S. 134–239.
- Hans-Peter Klausch: Tätergeschichten. Die SS-Kommandanten der frühen Konzentrationslager im Emsland. (= DIZ-Schriften; 13). Bremen 2005, ISBN 3-86108-059-1.
- Habbo Knoch: Die Emslandlager 1933–1945. In: Wolfgang Benz, Barbara Distel: Der Ort des Terrors. Geschichte der nationalsozialistischen Konzentrationslager. Band II: Frühe Lager, Dachau, Emslandlager. München 2005, ISBN 3-406-52962-3, S. 532–570.
- Erich Kosthorst, Bernd Walter: Konzentrations- und Strafgefangenenlager im Dritten Reich. Beispiel Emsland. Dokumentation und Analyse zum Verhältnis von NS-Regime und Justiz. Droste, Düsseldorf 1983, ISBN 3-7700-0638-0.
- Erich Kosthorst: Die Lager im Emsland unter dem NS-Regime 1933–1945. Aufgabe und Sinn geschichtlicher Erinnerung. In: Karl Dietrich Erdmann, J. Rohlfes (Hrsg.): Geschichte in Wissenschaft und Unterricht. Nr. 6/1984, Seelze 1984, S. 365–379, S. 372–373.
- Wolfgang Langhoff: Die Moorsoldaten. Verlag Neuer Weg, Stuttgart 1974, ISBN 3-88021-093-4. (Erste Auflage. Zürich 1935.)
- Elke Suhr: Die Emslandlager. Die politische und wirtschaftliche Bedeutung der emsländischen Konzentrations- und Strafgefangenenlager 1933–1945. Donat & Temmen, Bremen 1985, ISBN 3-924444-07-2.
- Willy Perk: Hölle im Moor. Zur Geschichte der Emslandlager 1933–1945. Röderberg, Frankfurt am Main 1979, ISBN 3-87682-713-2.
- Dirk Riedel: Ordnungshüter und Massenmörder im Dienst der "Volksgemeinschaft": Der KZ-Kommandant Hans Loritz. Metropol Verlag, Berlin 2010, ISBN 978-3-940938-63-3.
