= Das Andere Deutschland =

Weekly newspaper, 1925–1933, 1945–1969

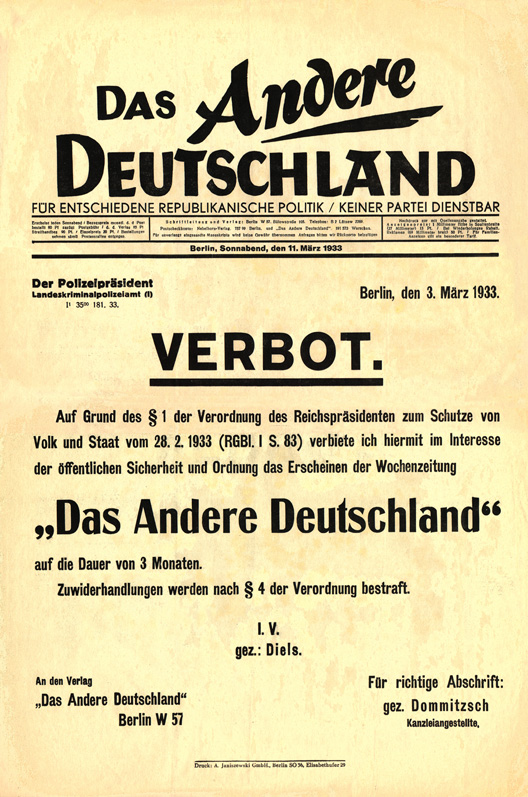
The final 1933 issue announcing the paper's shutdown, ordered by Nazi officials.

Das Andere Deutschland (German, "The Other Germany") was a weekly newspaper established in Germany in 1925 to advocate republican and pacifist causes until its forced closing by the Nazi-led government.

== History ==
The newspaper stemmed from the monthly review the Pazifist, created in 1921. Both publications were administered by Fritz Küster. Das Andere Deutschland was the publication organ of the German Peace Society. During the Weimar Republic, Kurt Tucholsky, Erich Kästner, Heinrich Ströbel, Berthold Jacob, Carl Mertens, and Friedrich William Foerster, among others, wrote for the newspaper.

The newspaper was shut down on 11 March 1933, less than two weeks after Paul von Hindenburg approved the Reichstag Fire Decree written by the Adolf Hitler government. Although it was initially supposed to be banned for three months, the Nazis' subsequent abrogation of remaining civil liberties kept it shuttered for the rest of the Nazi era. Küster was arrested and held in concentration camps from 1933 to 1938.

At the end of World War II, Küster resumed publication of the paper. In 1969, three years after Küster's death, the newspaper ran its final issue.

== See also ==
- Gleichschaltung
- Nazi Germany
- List of newspapers in Germany
