= Friedensbund der Kriegsteilnehmer =

Anti-war veterans organisation in Weimar Germany

The Friedensbund der Kriegsteilnehmer (commonly translated as "Association of War Veterans for Peace") was a nonparty, pacifist, and anti-military organisation in the Weimar Republic. It was instituted by former soldiers who had fought in World War I and existed from 1919 to 1927. At its peak, around 1921, the organization had about 30,000 members. Initiators and founding members included the authors Carl von Ossietzky und Kurt Tucholsky, and the scientists Emil Julius Gumbel und Georg Friedrich Nicolai.
