= Darmstädter Signal =

Independent organization

Logo

Darmstädter Signal is an independent organization (military watchdog group) opposing weapons of mass destruction and the primary use of military means to solve conflicts. It was founded in 1983 as a group of officers, soldiers and civil Army employees of the German Bundeswehr. According to its mission statement, the organization respects the German army's role to defend the country within the existing legal framework, but strives to give critical feedback about the army's mission and alternative non-military concepts of conflict resolution. The Darmstädter Signal sees the central task of the Bundeswehr in defense of freedom and democracy as basic principles of the country.

== History ==
The organization was founded in September 1983 in Darmstadt by 20 officers and Unteroffiziers. The main point of Darmstädter Signal was to oppose the deployment of new nuclear weapons/missiles in Central Europe as a result of the NATO Double-Track Decision. The working group still demands the removal of weapons of mass destruction and of American nuclear weapons in Germany as of today. On March 15, 1986, supporters of the DS founded a funding association. Today, 130 members belong to the working group and 200 supporters to the funding association. Annually, two to three workshops and public meetings take place to define positions and to draw attention to new developments through talks and lectures.

Several former Ministers, active and former members of the Bundestag as well as several former Generals of the Bundeswehr are members of the funding association. Spokesmen of the funding association were Horst-Eberhard Richter, Gernot Erler and Konrad Gilges. Since autumn 2013, the retired General-Surgeon Karl Wilhelm Demmer assumes this position.

The 25th anniversary of the organization was celebrated in the House of History in Bonn with a laudation by Egon Bahr. For 27 years, Helmuth Prieß had been the spokesman of the Signal.

== Goals ==
On the basis of the principle of Innere Führung ("Inner Leadership", meaning leadership with participation and education) with its corollary of the citizen in uniform the "Signalers" use their fundamental right of free speech also in public and contribute to assure that the norms and values of the German Basic Law remain embedded in the Bundeswehr. The concept of Innere Führung was introduced during the early years of the new German armed forces after World War II and especially advocated by Lieutenant General Wolf Graf von Baudissin. It is a hallmark making the difference between Bundeswehr and Wehrmacht. Important goals of the working group Darmstädter Signal are the removal of nuclear warheads and the democratization of armed forces. Darmstädter Signal does not reflect a general or official image of the mood and opinion in the German armed forces.

== Demands ==
- Absolute precedence of peacekeeping and peaceful solutions of conflicts over military missions.
- Strict abidance of the army to constitutional principles and international law.
- Empowerment of UN and OSCE
- Removal of all weapons of mass destruction
- National defense in alliance
- Reduction of the German Army to 120,000 soldiers
- No participation in peace-enforcing military missions
- Participation in peace-keeping Blue Beret Missions
- Removal of the atomic warheads from Buechel and Ramstein
- No in-country missions of the German armed forces
- Continuation of the suspension of conscription
- End of weapon exports
- Democratization of armed forces
- Open discussion of ethic questions of soldierhood
