= Reichstag Fire Decree =

1933 emergency decree in Nazi Germany suspending civil liberties

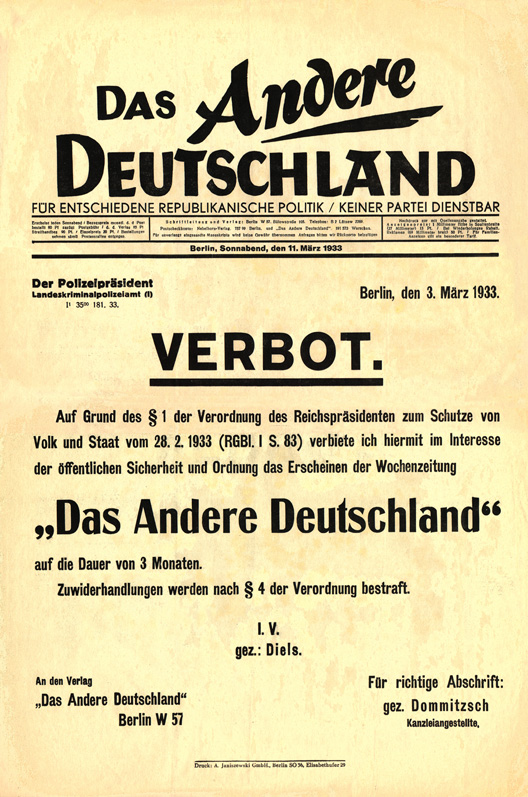
The final issue of Das Andere Deutschland ("The Other Germany"), announcing its own prohibition (Verbot) by police authorities under the Reichstag Fire Decree

The Reichstag Fire Decree (German: Reichstagsbrandverordnung), officially the Decree of the Reich President for the Protection of People and State (German: Verordnung des Reichspräsidenten zum Schutz von Volk und Staat), was an emergency decree issued by Paul von Hindenburg on 28 February 1933, the day after the Reichstag fire and five days before the final elections in the Weimar Republic. Issued under Article 48 of the Weimar Constitution, the decree suspended key civil liberties guaranteed by the Weimar Constitution, including personal liberty, freedom of expression, freedom of the press, freedom of assembly, freedom of association, the privacy of postal and telephone communications, and protections against house searches and property confiscation.

The decree became one of the central legal foundations of the Nazi dictatorship. It enabled the arrest and imprisonment of political opponents without specific charges, the banning of opposition publications and meetings, and the expansion of central government authority over the German states. Although formally promulgated as a temporary emergency measure, it remained in force until the end of Nazi Germany in 1945.

== Background ==
The Reichstag Fire Decree emerged from the constitutional crisis of the late Weimar Republic. By the early 1930s, successive presidential cabinets were increasingly governing through emergency decrees under Article 48 rather than through stable parliamentary majorities, weakening the Reichstag and normalizing rule by decree. Article 48 allowed the Reich president, in cases where public order and security were "seriously disturbed or endangered", to take emergency measures and to suspend specific constitutional rights; it also required that the Reichstag be informed and allowed it to revoke such measures.

Adolf Hitler was appointed Chancellor of Germany on 30 January 1933 at the head of a coalition government with the German National People's Party (DNVP). New elections were called for 5 March 1933. Even before the Reichstag fire, Hitler's government had begun restricting civil liberties. On 4 February 1933, Hindenburg signed the Decree for the Protection of the German People, which empowered the authorities to ban meetings, suppress publications, and hinder opposition campaigning.

On the evening of 27 February 1933, the Reichstag building in Berlin was set on fire. The exact circumstances of the fire have remained controversial in historical debate, but there is broad agreement that the Nazi leadership exploited it immediately for political purposes. Hitler and his supporters quickly blamed the Communist Party of Germany (KPD) and portrayed the fire as the opening signal for a Communist uprising. According to Rudolf Diels, Hitler reacted to the fire by denouncing the alleged Communist perpetrators and insisting that ruthless measures were necessary.

Within hours of the fire, dozens of Communists had been arrested. The government publicly presented the blaze as the beginning of an insurrection and used that claim to justify much broader emergency legislation. In the Prussian Interior Ministry, officials moved quickly to provide legal cover for the arrests and repression already underway. According to Richard J. Evans, the idea of using an emergency presidential decree under Article 48 was developed immediately after the fire and then expanded in cabinet discussions.

== Promulgation ==
The decree was signed by President Hindenburg on 28 February 1933 and countersigned by Hitler, Interior Minister Wilhelm Frick, and Justice Minister Franz Gürtner. Its formal legal basis was Article 48(2) of the Weimar Constitution.

The official title stressed the "protection of people and state", but in practice the measure marked a decisive break with constitutional government. At an emergency cabinet meeting, Hitler argued that the Reichstag fire made it impossible to proceed on the basis of ordinary judicial considerations, while Frick used the opportunity to strengthen central state power at the expense of the Länder. The decree therefore not only suspended civil liberties but also significantly strengthened the Reich government's powers against the federal states, undermining what remained of the constitutional balance between the national government and the Länder.

== Provisions ==
The decree consisted of six substantive sections.

=== Suspension of fundamental rights ===
Section 1 suspended Articles 114, 115, 117, 118, 123, 124, and 153 of the Weimar Constitution "until further notice". These articles protected personal liberty, the inviolability of the home, the privacy of mail and telecommunications, freedom of expression and of the press, freedom of assembly, freedom of association, and property rights. The decree further authorized restrictions on those rights beyond the limits otherwise prescribed by law, thereby legalizing extensive police intervention without the normal judicial safeguards.

=== Intervention in the states ===
Sections 2 and 3 empowered the Reich government to intervene directly in state governments that, in its judgment, failed to restore "public safety and order", and required state and local authorities to comply with Reich directives. This provision accelerated the destruction of German federalism and provided a legal mechanism for central control over state police and internal administration.

=== Penal provisions ===
Sections 4 and 5 introduced severe criminal penalties for resistance to the decree and expanded the use of the death penalty, including for certain offenses involving arson, sabotage, and violent acts framed as threats to the state. In addition to allowing punishment for disobedience to emergency orders, the decree made death a possible penalty for several offenses that the regime linked to treason, political violence, or attacks on public safety. These provisions formed part of a broader effort to criminalize political opposition under the guise of emergency security legislation.

== Immediate implementation ==
The decree was implemented immediately and aggressively. Within hours and days of the fire, thousands of Communists and Social Democrats were arrested, and opposition meetings and newspapers were banned. The decree allowed the regime to detain political opponents without specific charges and removed many of the legal restraints that had previously limited police action.

The heaviest early repression occurred in Prussia, where Hermann Göring controlled the largest police force in Germany. There, summary arrests of KPD officials and activists became common, and thousands were imprisoned in the days following the fire. On 3 March 1933, Göring issued instructions to the Prussian police making clear that the decree was to be used first and foremost against Communists, though action against others could also be justified if it served the struggle against alleged Communist activity in a broader sense.

Among the first major targets was the Communist Party of Germany (KPD). Communist leader Ernst Thälmann was detained during the mass arrests that followed the fire. Other leading Communists, including Wilhelm Pieck and Walter Ulbricht, escaped arrest and later lived in exile. The decree also affected the Social Democrats and other opponents of the regime; GHDI notes that thousands of Communists and Social Democrats were arrested and that their meetings and publications were outlawed, while the Nazi election campaign continued unhindered.

The 5 March 1933 Reichstag election was therefore held under conditions of state repression, intimidation, and unequal access to the public sphere. Even so, the Nazi Party won only 43.9 percent of the vote and still required its DNVP partner for a parliamentary majority. The KPD nevertheless won 81 seats, but its deputies were prevented from participating effectively in parliamentary life as arrests, expulsions, and intimidation continued.

== Role in the Nazi seizure of power ==
The Reichstag Fire Decree was a crucial step in the Nazi destruction of constitutional democracy. By suspending civil liberties and normalizing arbitrary detention, it created the legal conditions under which the Nazis could neutralize political opposition while preserving a façade of legality.

The decree also paved the way for the Enabling Act of 1933, passed on 23 March 1933. Because Communist deputies had been arrested, expelled, or forced into hiding, and because many Social Democratic deputies were likewise absent through imprisonment or persecution, the government was able to secure the necessary parliamentary conditions for the act's passage. The Enabling Act then transferred legislative authority from the Reichstag to Hitler's cabinet, allowing the regime to legislate independently of parliament and even contrary to the constitution.

Although the Enabling Act is often treated as the decisive legal foundation of the Nazi dictatorship, the Reichstag Fire Decree remained indispensable. It supplied the ongoing emergency powers under which political dissent was suppressed, publications banned, private communications monitored, and individuals imprisoned without ordinary legal protections. In this sense, the decree did not simply prepare the dictatorship; it became a permanent feature of the Nazi police state.

In his study of the Nazi seizure of power, Evans also argued that the legal process surrounding the Enabling Act was compromised by the prior Nazification of the states and by the exclusion or intimidation of opposition deputies, making the appearance of constitutional legality deeply misleading. Evans argued that the states were "no longer properly constituted or represented" as a result of the Reichstag Fire Decree, making the Enabling Act's passage "irregular".

== Historical significance ==
Historians generally treat the decree as one of the most important legal turning points in the collapse of the Weimar Republic and creation of the Nazi state. It demonstrated how a constitutional emergency clause could be used to dismantle constitutional government from within.

Its significance lay not only in the rights it suspended, but also in the precedent it entrenched: that political opponents could be treated as enemies of the state outside the ordinary protections of law. The decree thereby transformed emergency rule from a temporary instrument into a standing framework for persecution and dictatorship. It remained in force throughout the Third Reich and was never formally revoked by the Nazi regime.

The Nazi exploitation of Article 48 and the Reichstag Fire Decree later influenced the framers of the postwar Basic Law for the Federal Republic of Germany, who sharply curtailed the powers of the federal president in order to avoid a recurrence of rule by emergency decree.

== See also ==
- Article 48 (Weimar Constitution)
- Enabling Act of 1933
- Gleichschaltung
- Reichstag fire
- Rule by decree
