= Helmuth Prieß =

German soldier

- Born: 18 March 1939; Hildesheim, Germany
- Died: 26 April 2012 (aged 73); Bonn, Germany
- Known for: Military-related criticism
- Political party: Social Democratic Party
- Military career
- Allegiance: Germany
- Branch: German Army
- Service years: c. 1961–1993
- Rank: Lieutenant colonel
- Awards: Order of Merit of the Federal Republic of Germany (Cross); Gustav Heinemann Civic Award

Helmuth Prieß (18 March 1939, Hildesheim – 26 April 2012, Bonn) was a German professional soldier, and one of the founders and speaker of the Darmstädter Signal, an independent organization opposing weapons of mass destruction and the primary usage of military means to solve conflicts. His signing of a critical resolution led to a demotion of two ranks in 1992, until the Federal Administrative Court of Germany repealed this disciplinary punishment after one year. In 1996, Prieß received the Order of Merit of the Federal Republic of Germany and continued to campaign for topics in context of the peace movement throughout the following years.

== Early life ==
Helmuth Prieß was born 18 March 1939 in Hildesheim, Germany in a conservative family with military background. After the premature attainment of a high school diploma and an apprenticeship as wholesaler, he became a professional soldier. Two posts as company commander in the German Army included the organization and safeguarding of nuclear materials' transports. Following his criticism of nuclear weapons, he was transferred to the Army Office in Cologne in 1972 and was concerned with training matters and the inspection of army schools.

== Army criticism and trial ==
Opposing weapons of mass destruction and the primary usage of military means to solve conflicts, Prieß co-founded the Darmstädter Signal in 1983 and served as the working group's speaker during the following years, except a brief pause from 1996 until 1997. Darmstädter Signal is an independent organization of officers, soldiers, and civil Army employees. According to its mission statement, the organization respects the German Army's role—defending the country within the existing legal framework—, but strives to give critical feedback about the Army's mission and alternative non-military concepts of conflict resolution.

In 1984, a physician of IPPNW labelled soldiers as potential murderers (German: "Jeder Soldat ist ein potentieller Mörder ...") in a public debate about the threat of a nuclear war. This remark triggered a heated dispute in German politics and society about freedom of speech weighed against protecting soldiers against possible defamation and the German Army as institution. Courts in Frankfurt rejected charges against the physician in the following years, harshly criticised as "irresponsible verdict" (German: "Das Urteil ist unverantwortlich.") from several, mostly conservative, members of the German parliament.

To address those critics in support of the court's decision, the Darmstädter Signal issued a press statement in 1989. The declaration was signed by Prieß and twenty other officers, and stressed the remark's context within a controversial discussion about the risk of a nuclear war. Despite a reluctant evaluation from legal advisors, the Army Office opened disciplinary proceedings against Prieß and demoted him from major to first lieutenant in 1992. After this decision was challenged at court, it was annulled in last instance by a senate for disciplinary matters of the armed forces at the Federal Administrative Court of Germany: the demotion was repealed, and Prieß had to pay a disciplinary fine of 500 Deutsche Mark. The court held that Prieß' signature did not violate his duty of loyalty, but was against his responsibility of restraint as a soldier and superior. Soon afterwards he was promoted to lieutenant colonel and retired from active service on 30 September 1993.

== Other activities and later life ==
Following the founding of Darmstädter Signal and his trial, Prieß continued to comment on primarily military-related topics in speeches and articles. Among other themes, discussed issues have been the war in Afghanistan, alleged mistreatment during army training and his criticism of proposed army missions against terrorist threats on German territory.

Prieß was a member of the Social Democratic Party of Germany (SPD) since 1972, of the Public Service Union ÖTV since 1974 and later of its successor organization ver.di. Since 1979, he was a member of the municipal council of Swisttal for 30 years, and First Deputy Mayor of the municipality from 1984 until 1999. Prieß was speaker and press contact of the ADFC cyclist association in Swisttal; together with his wife Anne he organized yearly art exhibitions in Heimerzheim, Swisttal.

Helmuth Prieß died after a severe illness on 26 April 2012 in Bonn.

== Awards ==
- Gustav Heinemann Civic Award of the SPD (1984)
- Clara Immerwahr Award of the IPPNW (1992)
- Order of Merit of the Federal Republic of Germany (1996), Cross
- Testimonial of the municipality Swisttal (2011)

== See also ==
- Darmstädter Signal
