= Carl von Ossietzky =

German journalist and pacifist (1889–1938)

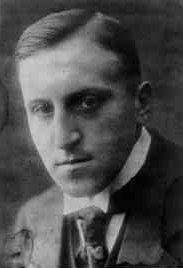
- Ossietzky in 1915
- Born: 3 October 1889; Hamburg, Germany
- Died: 4 May 1938 (aged 48); Berlin, Germany
- Occupations: Journalist, political activist
- Spouse: Maud Lichfield-Woods
- Children: Rosalinde von Ossietzky-Palm
- Awards: Nobel Peace Prize (1935)

Carl von Ossietzky (German: [ˈkaʁl fɔn ɔˈsi̯ɛtskiː]; 3 October 1889 – 4 May 1938) was a German journalist and pacifist. He was the recipient of the 1935 Nobel Peace Prize for his work in exposing the clandestine German rearmament.

As editor-in-chief of the magazine Die Weltbühne, Ossietzky published a series of exposés in the late 1920s detailing Germany's violation of the Treaty of Versailles by rebuilding an air force (the predecessor of the Luftwaffe) and training pilots in the Soviet Union. He was convicted of treason and espionage in 1931 and sentenced to eighteen months in prison, but was granted amnesty in December 1932.

Ossietzky continued to be a vocal critic of German militarism after the Nazis' rise to power. Following the 1933 Reichstag fire, Ossietzky was again arrested and sent to the Esterwegen concentration camp near Oldenburg. His brutal torture after his arrest was documented by the International Red Cross. He was awarded the 1935 Nobel Peace Prize in 1936, but was forbidden from travelling to Norway to accept it. After enduring five years of mistreatment in Nazi concentration camps, Ossietzky died of tuberculosis in a Berlin hospital in 1938.

== Early life ==
Ossietzky was born in Hamburg, the son of Carl Ignatius von Ossietzky (1848–1891), a Protestant from Upper Silesia, and Rosalie (née Pratzka), a devout Catholic who wanted her son to enter Holy Orders and become a priest or monk. His father worked as a stenographer in the office of a lawyer, and of senator Max Predöhl, but died when Ossietzky was two years old. Ossietzky was baptized as a Roman Catholic in Hamburg on 10 November 1889 and confirmed in the Lutheran Hauptkirche St Michaelis on 23 March 1904.

The von in Ossietzky's name, which would generally suggest noble ancestry, is of unknown origin. Ossietzky himself explained, perhaps half in jest, that it derived from an ancestor's service in a Polish lancer cavalry regiment as the Elector of Brandenburg was unable to pay his two regiments of lancers at one point due to an empty war chest, so he instead conferred nobility upon the entirety of the two regiments.

Despite his failure to finish Realschule (a form of German secondary school), Ossietzky succeeded in embarking on a career in journalism, with the topics of his articles ranging from theatre criticism to feminism and the problems of early motorisation. He later said that his opposition to German militarism during the final years of the German Empire under Wilhelm II led him as early as 1913 to become a pacifist.

That year, he married Maud Lichfield-Woods, a Mancunian suffragette, born to a British colonial officer and the great-granddaughter of an Indian princess from Hyderabad. They had one daughter, Rosalinda. During World War I, Ossietzky was drafted much against his will into the Army and his experiences during the war – where he was appalled by the carnage – confirmed him in his pacifism. During the Weimar Republic (1919–1933), his political commentaries gained him a reputation as a fervent supporter of democracy and a pluralistic society.

== Discovery of illegal German rearmament ==
In 1921, the German military founded the Arbeitskommandos (work squads) built up by Major Bruno Ernst Buchrucker. Officially labour groups intended to assist with civilian projects, in reality the members were soldiers secretly trained by the Reichswehr in order to exceed the limits on troop strength set by the Treaty of Versailles.

The Black Reichswehr took its orders from a group in the German Army led by Fedor von Bock, Kurt von Schleicher, Eugen Ott and Kurt von Hammerstein-Equord. The Black Reichswehr became infamous for using Feme murders to punish "traitors" who, for example, revealed the locations of weapons' stockpiles or names of members. Secret "trials" were conducted of which the victims were unaware, and after finding the accused guilty they would send out a man to execute the "court's" sentence of death. During the trials of some of those charged with the murders, prosecutors alleged that the killings were ordered by the officers from Bock's group. Regarding the Feme murders, Ossietzky wrote:

Lieutenant Schulz (charged with the murder of informers against the Black Reichswehr) did nothing but carry out the orders given him, and that certainly Colonel von Bock, and probably Colonel von Schleicher and General Seeckt, should be sitting in the dock beside him.

Reflecting his pacifism, Ossietzky became secretary of the German Peace Society (German: Deutsche Friedensgesellschaft) in 1919.

== "Homeless left" ==
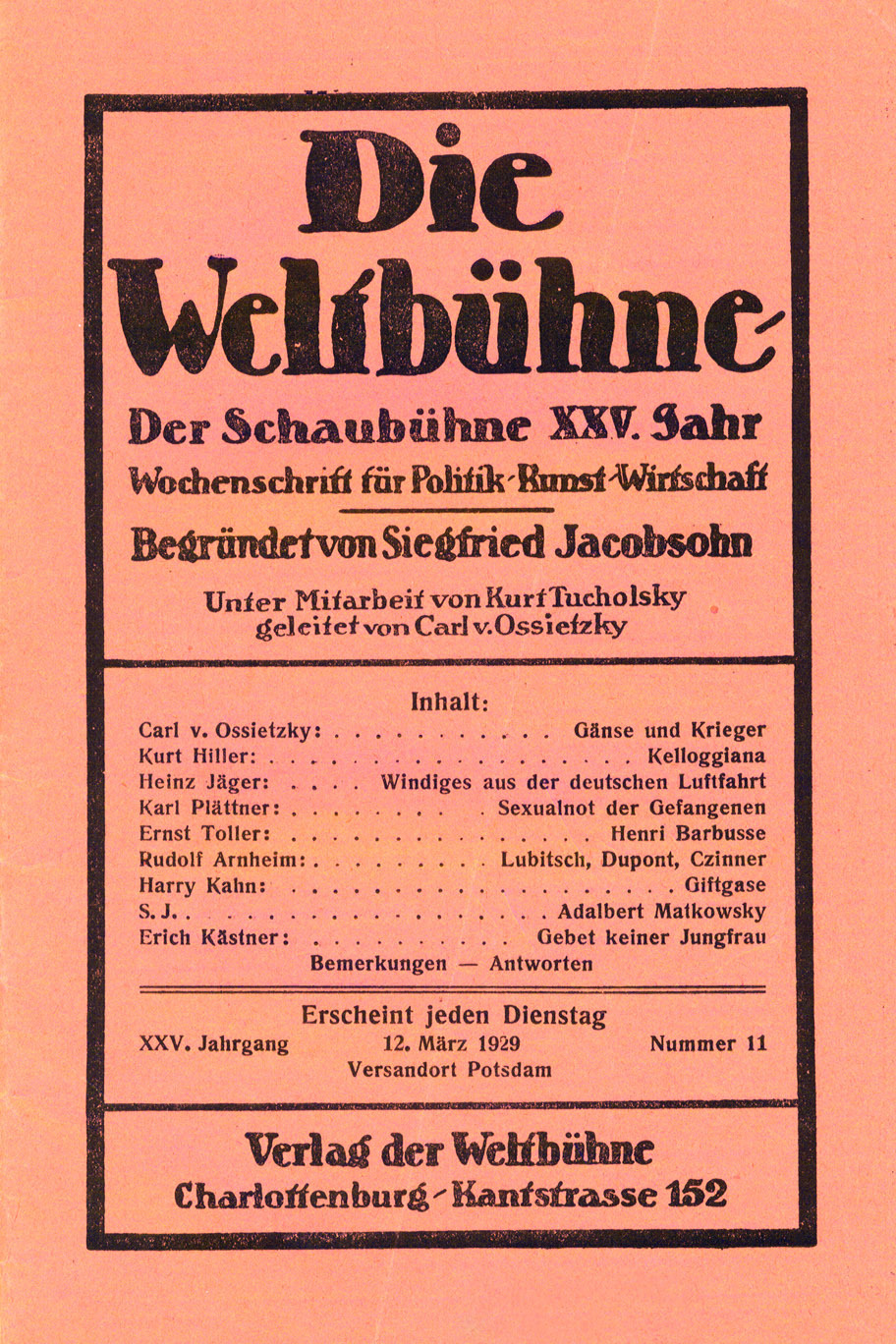
Weltbühne cover, 12 March 1929

In the 1920s, Ossietzky became one of the leaders of the "homeless left", centered on the newspaper Die Weltbühne which rejected Communism, but found the Social Democrats too inclined to compromise with the old order.

Ossietzky often complained that the men who staffed the bureaucracy, the judiciary and the military under the Kaiser were the same men serving the Weimar Republic, something that was a major concern for him as he frequently warned that these men had no commitment to democracy, and would turn against the republic at the first chance.

In this regard, Ossietzky at Die Weltbühne helped to publish a statistical study in 1923, showing that German judges were inclined to impose extremely harsh sentences on those who broke laws in the name of the left while imposing very lenient sentences on those who committed much violence in the name of the right. He often drew a contrast between the fate of Social Democrat Felix Fechenbach who was imprisoned after a questionable trial for publishing secret documents showing that the German Empire was responsible for World War I and that of the Navy captain Hermann Ehrhardt of the Freikorps whose men occupied Berlin during the Kapp Putsch, killed several hundred civilians and was never tried for his actions. At the same time, Ossietzky was often critical of those republicans who claimed to believe in democracy without actually knowing what democracy meant.

Ossietzky was especially critical of the Reichsbanner Schwarz-Rot-Gold (Reich Banner Black-Red-Gold), the paramilitary group set up by the Social Democrats to defend democracy. Ossietzky wrote in 1924:

Whoever has learned from the events of the past five years knows that it is not the nationalists, the monarchists who represent the real danger, but the absence of substantive content and ideas in the concept of the German republic and that no-one will succeed in vitalizing that concept. Defence of the republic is good. It is better to go beyond that to an understanding of what in the republic is worth defending and what should not be retained. This question escapes the Reichsbanner; more precisely, it has probably not yet recognized that such a question even exists.

Our republic is not yet an object of mass consciousness but a constitutional document and a governmental administration. When people want to see the republic, they are shown the Wilhelmstrasse. And then one wonders why they return home somewhat shamed. Nothing is there to make the heart beat faster. Around this state, lacking any ideas and with an eternally guilty conscience, there are grouped a couple of so-called constitutional parties, likewise lacking an idea and with no better conscience, which are not led, but administered. Administered by a bureaucratic caste that is responsible for the misery of recent years in domestic and foreign affairs and that smothers all signs of fresh life with a cold hand. If the Reichsbanner does not find within itself the idea, the inspiring idea, and the youth does not finally storm the gates, then it will not become the avant-garde of the republic, but the cudgel-guard of the partycrats, and their interests will be defended foremost, not the republic...

And the effect? The Reichsbanner honours the constitution with festivals; the Reichsbanner goose-steps; the Reichsbanner drapes Potsdam in black-red-gold; the Reichsbanner scraps with the Communists and Fechenbach sits in the penitentiary. That is the joke of it. But if the Reichsbanner had as many determined fellows among its members as Captain Ehrhardt, then Fechenbach would no longer be sitting in the penitentiary today. French democrats rescued their Spanish brothers in the cause, whom they did not even know by sight, from the claws of a dictator. The thought of an injustice committed somewhere in the world kept them from sleeping. The German democrats and socialists are more solidly organized. It is not at all true that they are as weak-kneed as is always believed; it is just that they have terribly thick skin. Besides, they are faithful to the law and to the constitution. To rescue someone from prison-that would mean acting against the law! God forbid! And Fechenbach sits in the penitentiary.

In 1927, Ossietzky succeeded Kurt Tucholsky as editor-in-chief of the periodical Die Weltbühne. In 1932, he supported Ernst Thälmann's candidacy for the German presidency, though still a critic of the actual policy of the German Communist Party and the Soviet Union.

== Abteilung M affair ==
On 12 March 1929 Die Weltbühne published an article by Walter Kreiser, one of its writers: an exposé of the training of a special air unit of the Reichswehr, referred to as Abteilung M (Section M), which was secretly training in Germany and in Soviet Russia, in violation of Germany's agreements under the 1919 Treaty of Versailles. Kreiser and Ossietzky, the paper's editor, were questioned by a magistrate of the Supreme Court about the article later that year and were finally indicted in early 1931 for "treason and espionage", the assertion being that they had drawn international attention to state affairs which the state had purposefully attempted to keep secret. The arrests were widely seen at the time as an effort to silence Die Weltbühne, which had been a vocal critic of the Reichswehr's policies and secret expansion.

Counsel for the defendants pointed out that the information they had published was true, and – more to the point – that the budgeting for Abteilung M had actually been cited in reports by the Reichstag's budgeting commission. The prosecution successfully countered that Kreiser (and Ossietzky as his editor) should have known that the reorganization was a state secret when he questioned the Ministry of Defense on the subject of Abteilung M and the ministry refused to comment on it. Kreiser and Ossietzky were convicted and sentenced by the Reichsgericht on 23 November 1931 to eighteen months in prison. Kreiser fled Germany, but Ossietzky remained and was imprisoned, being released at the end of 1932 on the occasion of the Christmas amnesty.

== Arrest by the Nazis ==
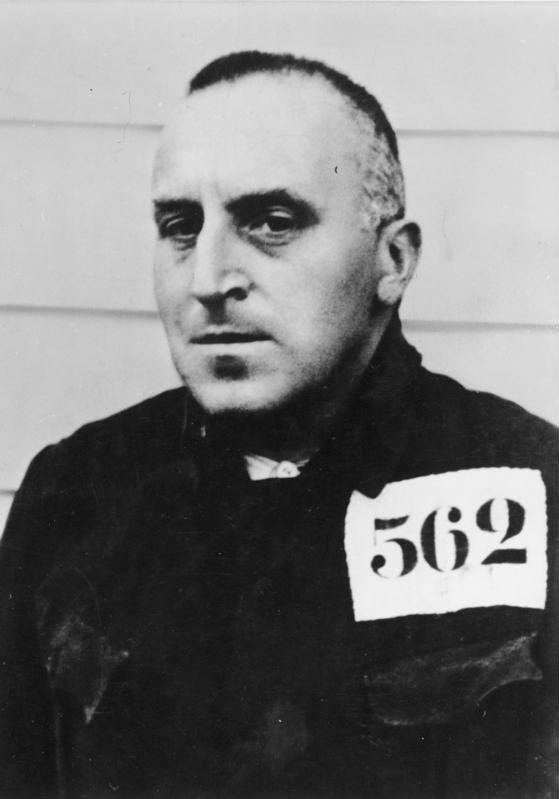
Ossietzky in Esterwegen concentration camp, 1934

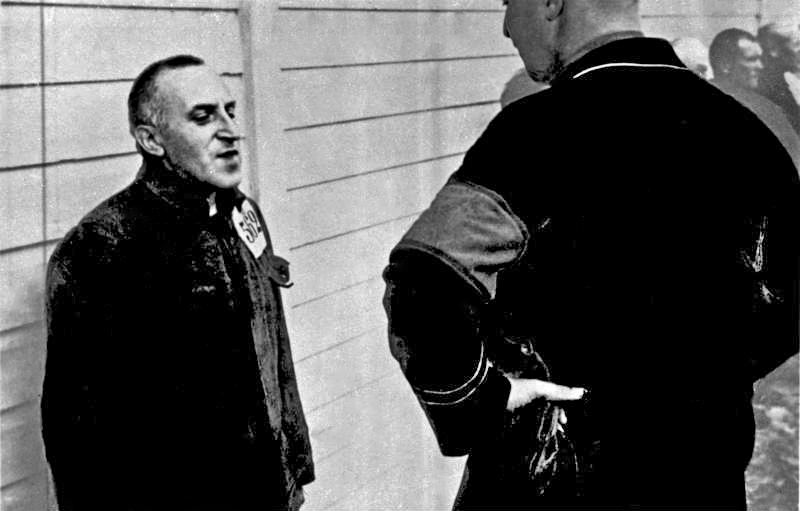
Ossietzky in the Esterwegen concentration camp, "Ossietsky – A man speaks with a hollow voice from across the border", 1934

Ossietzky continued to be a constant warning voice against militarism and Nazism. In 1932, he published an article in which he stated:

Anti-Semitism is akin to nationalism and its best ally. They are of a kind because a nation that, without territory or state power, has wandered through two thousand years of world history is a living refutation of the whole nationalist ideology that derives the concept of a nation exclusively from factors of power politics. Anti-Semitism has never had roots among workers. It has always been a middle-class and small-peasant affair. Today, when these classes face their greatest crisis, it has become to them a kind of religion or at least a substitute for religion. Nationalism and anti-Semitism dominate the German domestic political picture. They are the barrel organs of fascism, whose pseudo-revolutionary shrieks drown out the softer tremolo of social reaction.

In the same essay, Ossietzky wrote:

Intellectual anti-Semitism was the special prerogative of Houston Stewart Chamberlain, who, in The Foundations of the Nineteenth Century, concretized the fantasies of Count Arthur de Gobineau, which had penetrated to Bayreuth. He translated them from the language of harmless snobbery into that of a modernized, seductive mysticism... Contemporary anti-Semitic literature, insofar as it is not simple, crude Jew-baiting, in so far as it claims intellectual consideration, is satisfied to postulate an imposing Teutonism which, examined critically dissolves into thin air like a beautiful Epicurean god. The word blood plays a large part in its phraseology. Blood, the immutable substance, determines the fate of nations and men. Because of the secret laws of blood, Germans and Jews will never be able to mix, must be mutually antagonistic until doomsday. This is romantic but hardly deep. No real science of nationalities can be based on such flimsy premises. For German and Jewish are not fixed categories established once and for all in some mystic prehistoric age, but rather flexible concepts which change their content with spiritual and economic changes dependent on the general dynamics of history.

Finally, Ossietzky warned: "Today there is a strong smell of blood in the air. Literary anti-Semitism forges the moral weapon for murder. Sturdy and honest lads will take care of the rest".

Adolf Hitler was appointed Chancellor in January 1933, the Nazi dictatorship began soon after in late March with the Enabling Act of 1933, but even then Ossietzky was one of a very small group of public figures who continued to speak out against the Nazi Party. On 28 February 1933, after the Reichstag fire, he was arrested and held in so-called protective custody in Spandau prison. Wilhelm von Sternburg, one of Ossietzky's biographers, surmises that if Ossietzky had had a few more days, he would surely have joined the vast majority of writers who fled the country. In short, Ossietzky underestimated the speed with which the Nazis would go about ridding the country of unwanted political opponents. He was detained afterwards at the Esterwegen concentration camp near Oldenburg, among other camps. Throughout his time in the concentration camps, Ossietzky was mercilessly mistreated by the guards while being deprived of food. In November 1935, when a representative of the International Red Cross visited Ossietzky, he reported that he saw "a trembling, deadly pale something, a creature that appeared to be without feeling, one eye swollen, teeth knocked out, dragging a broken, badly healed leg . . . a human being who had reached the uttermost limits of what could be borne".

== 1935 Nobel Peace Prize ==
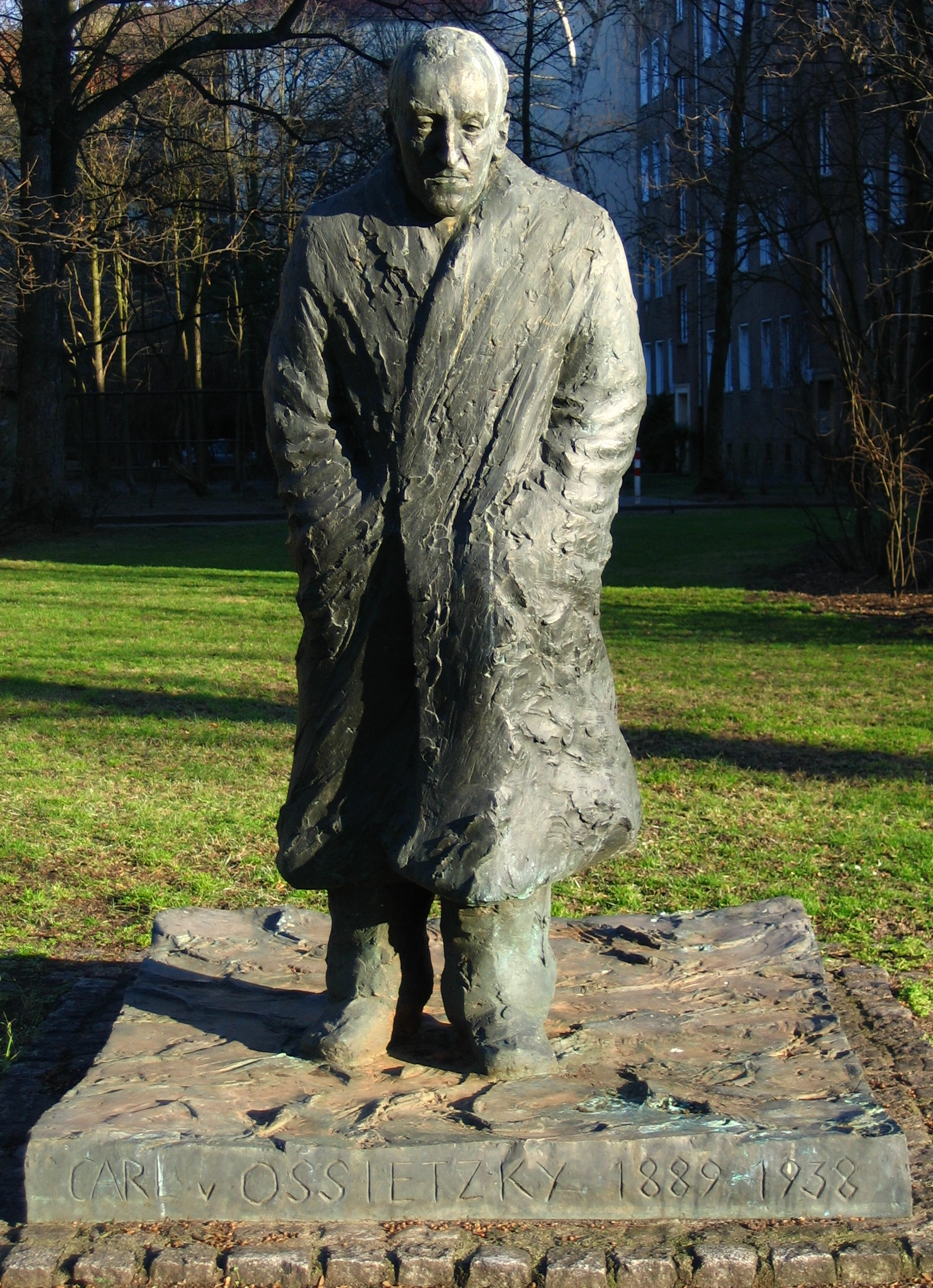
Carl von Ossietzky Memorial in the Berlin district Pankow

Ossietzky's international rise to fame began in 1936 when, already suffering from serious tuberculosis, he was awarded the 1935 Nobel Peace Prize. The government had been unable to prevent this but refused to release him to travel to Oslo to receive the prize. In an act of civil disobedience, after Hermann Göring prompted him to decline the prize, Ossietzky issued a note from the hospital saying that he disagreed with the authorities who had stated that by accepting the prize he would cast himself outside the deutsche Volksgemeinschaft (community of German people):

After much consideration, I have made the decision to accept the Nobel Peace Prize which has fallen to me. I cannot share the view put forward to me by the representatives of the Secret State Police that in doing so I exclude myself from German society. The Nobel Peace Prize is not a sign of an internal political struggle, but of understanding between peoples. As a recipient of the prize, I will do my best to encourage this understanding and as a German I will always bear in mind Germany's justifiable interests in Europe.

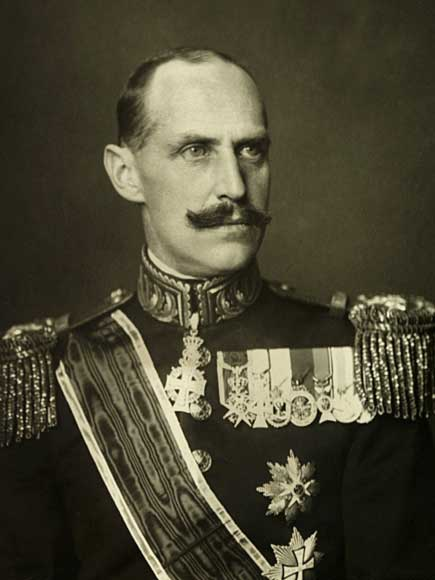
The award of the 1935 Nobel Peace Prize to Ossietzky was so controversial that King Haakon VII of Norway stayed away from the ceremony

The award was extremely controversial, prompting two members of the prize committee to resign because they held or had held positions in the Norwegian government. King Haakon VII of Norway, who had been present at other award ceremonies, stayed away from the ceremony.

The award divided public opinion and was generally condemned by conservative forces. The leading conservative Norwegian newspaper Aftenposten argued in an editorial that Ossietzky was a criminal who had attacked his country "with the use of methods that violated the law long before Hitler came into power" and that "lasting peace between peoples and nations can only be achieved by respecting the existing laws".

Ossietzky's Nobel Prize was not allowed to be mentioned in the German press and a government decree forbade German citizens from accepting future Nobel Prizes.

== Death ==
In May 1936, Ossietzky was sent to the Westend hospital in Berlin-Charlottenburg because of his tuberculosis, but under Gestapo surveillance. On 4 May 1938, he died in the Nordend hospital in Berlin-Pankow, still in police custody, of tuberculosis and from the after-effects of the abuse he suffered in the concentration camps.

== Legacy ==
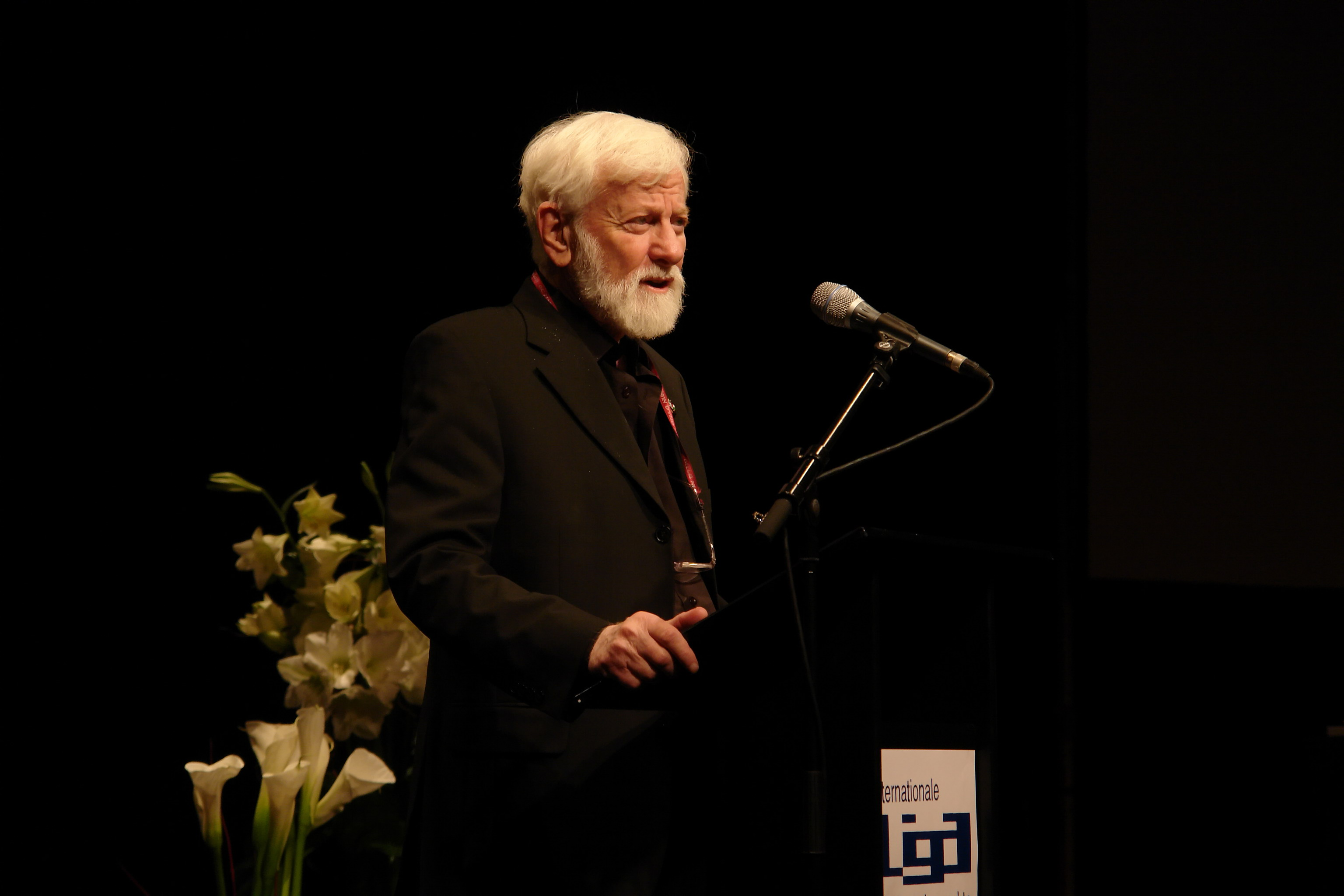
Uri Avnery delivering his acceptance speech at the 2008 Carl von Ossietzky Medal awards ceremony

In 1963, East German television produced the film Carl von Ossietzky about Ossietzky's life, starring Hans-Peter Minetti in the title role.

In 1974, the University of Oldenburg was renamed Carl von Ossietzky University of Oldenburg in his honor and Ossietzky's daughter Rosalinde von Ossietzky-Palm donated his archive and personal library to the university which has become a centre for research on his life and works.

In 1992, Ossietzky's 1931 conviction was upheld by Germany's Bundesgerichtshof (Federal Court of Justice), applying the law as it stood in 1931.

According to the case law of the Reichsgericht, the illegality of covertly conducted actions did not cancel out the principle of secrecy. According to the opinion of the Reichsgericht, every citizen owes his Fatherland a duty of allegiance regarding information, and endeavours towards the enforcement of existing laws may be implemented only through the utilization of responsible domestic state organs, and never by appealing to foreign governments.

Supporters of convicted Nobel Prize-winning Chinese dissident Liu Xiaobo compared him to Ossietzky, both being prevented by the authorities from accepting their awards and both having died while in custody. The International League for Human Rights (Berlin) awards an annual Carl von Ossietzky Medal "to honor citizens or initiatives that promote basic human rights".

=== Awards ===
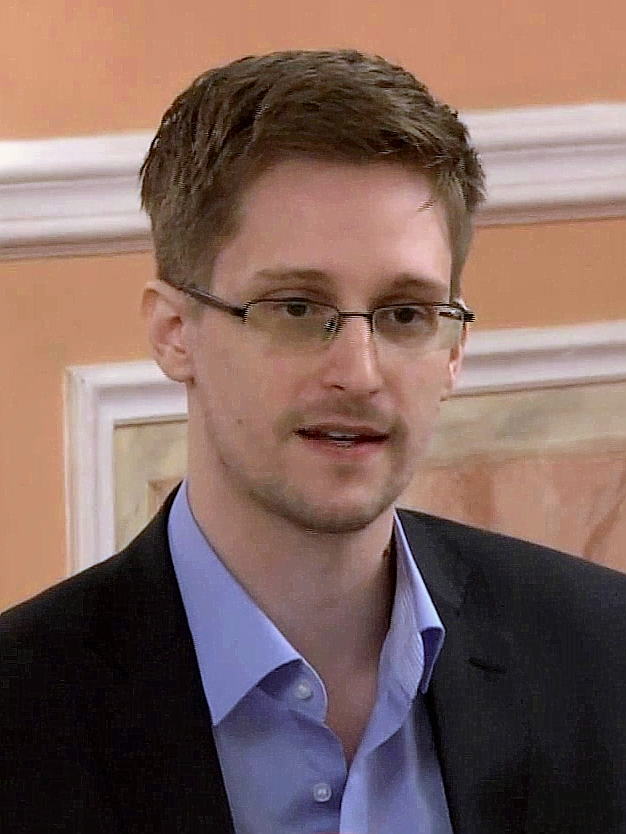
Edward Snowden, 2016 winner of the Ossietzky Prize

Since 1962 the Berlin based International League for Human Rights has awarded an annual 'Carl von Ossietzky Medal' in honour of those recognised for their contribution to advancement of human rights

Since 1984, the City of Oldenburg has awarded the biennial 'Carl von Ossietzky Prize of the City of Oldenburg for Contemporary History and Politics' to those who perpetuate his legacy.

Since 1993 PEN Norway, the Norwegian chapter of PEN, an international organisation that advocates for freedom of expression specifically for writers and journalists, has awarded the annual 'Ossietzky Prize' to individuals or organisations that have played an outstanding role in defending such freedoms.

== See also ==
- Pacifism in Germany
- List of peace activists
