= Prager Tagblatt =

Former German-language newspaper in Prague (1876–1939)

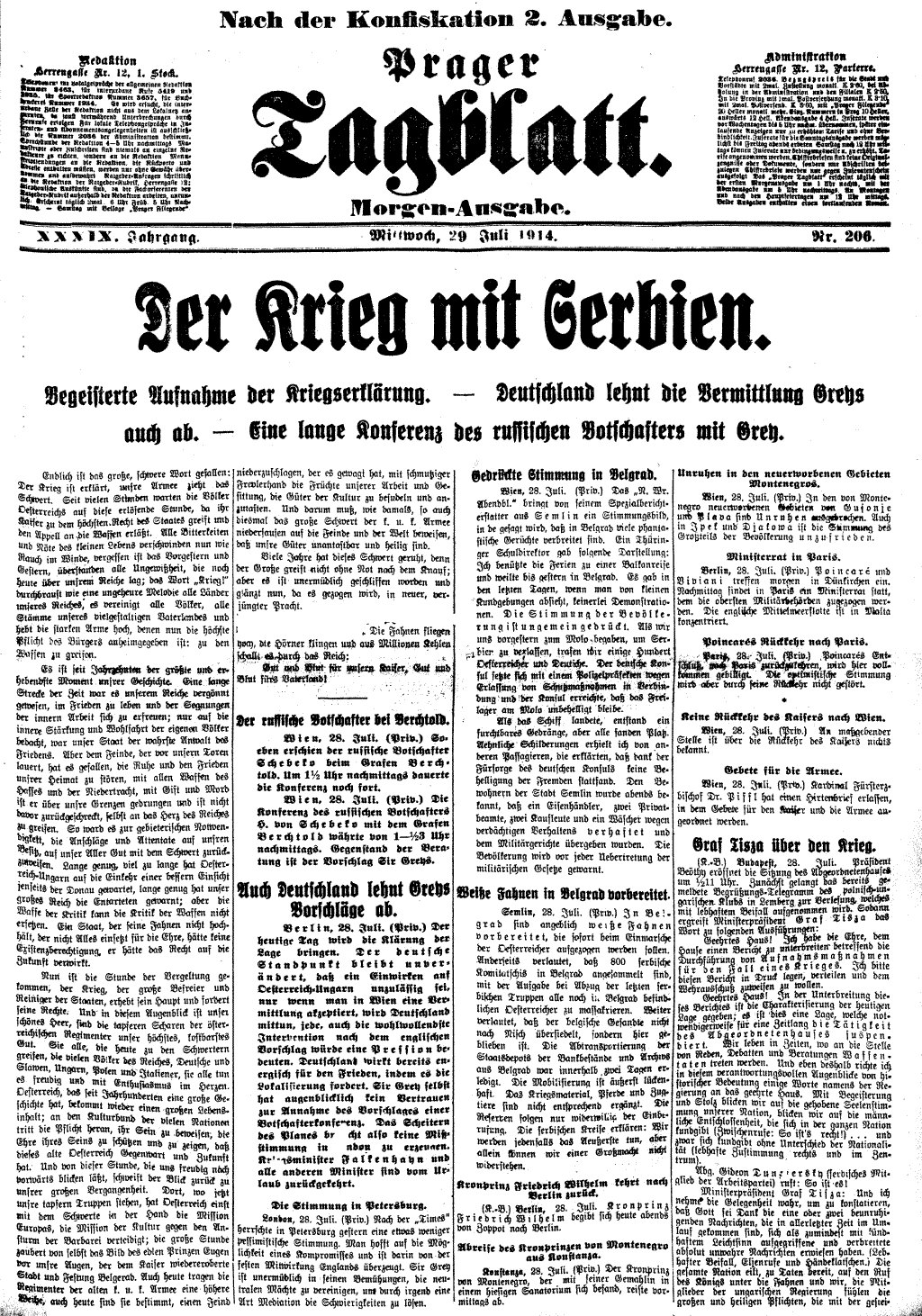
Prager Tagblatt. Front page 1914-07-29

The Prager Tagblatt was a German language newspaper published in Prague from 1876 to 1939. Considered to be the most influential liberal-democratic German newspaper in Bohemia, it stopped publication after the German occupation of Czechoslovakia. The Prager Zeitung, a German weekly published in Prague since 1991, claims to continue the traditions of the Prager Tagblatt.

Among the most important contributors to the newspaper were: Max Brod, Egon Erwin Kisch, Alfred Polgar, Alexander Roda Roda, Joseph Roth, Johannes Urzidil, Sándor Márai and Friedrich Torberg. Other important contributors were: Hans Bauer, Benjamin M. Bloch, Alfred Döblin, Martin Feuchtwanger, Egon Friedell, Stefan Großmann, Arnold Hahn, Arnold Höllriegel, Elisabeth Janstein, Siegfried Jacobsohn, Franz Kafka, František R. Kraus, Theodor Lessing, Franz Molnar, Hans Natonek, Leo Perutz, Heinrich Rauchberg, Walther Rode, Alice Rühle-Gerstel, Gisela Selden-Goth, and Hans Siemsen.
