= Siegfried Jacobsohn =

German writer and influential theatre critic

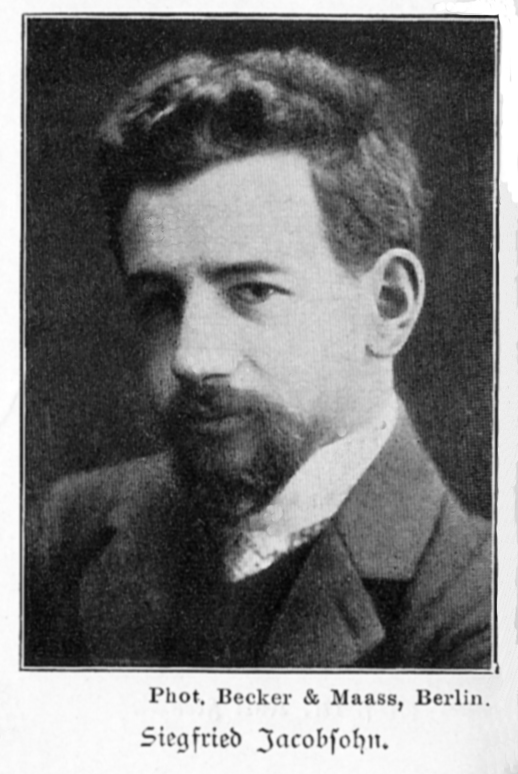
Siegfried Jacobsohn

Siegfried Jacobsohn (28 January 1881 – 3 December 1926) was a German journalist, editor and theatre critic. In 1905 he founded the magazine Die Schaubühne (The Schaubühne) and in 1918 renamed it Die Weltbühne (The Weltbühne), of which he remained editor until his death.

== Life ==
Born in Berlin into a Jewish family, Jacobsohn decided at the age of 15 to become a theatre critic. In October 1897 he left school without gaining any diplomas and began studying at Friedrich-Wilhelm-University as it was then called. At the time it was still possible to gain entrance to university without any formal qualification. Among his teachers at university were Erich Schmidt, Ulrich von Wilamowitz-Moellendorff and Max Herrmann. However, he seemed to have learnt more by studying reviews written by Maximilian Harden, Fritz Mauthner and Paul Schlenther, whose reviews he considered exemplary. He also consulted actors such as Albert Bassermann, Jakob Tiedtke and Richard Leopold.

When he was still a student, Jacobsohn was hired by Hellmut von Gerlach as a theatre critic for the Berlin weekly Die Welt am Montag. In an interview with the Frankfurter Zeitung published on 8 November 1926, von Gerlach remembered that this sapling had spent literally every evening of his school days at the theatre. He knew every actor in every part and he knew the complete stage literature. Accompanied by an accurate sense of judgment hardly to be imagined by someone of his age. It was a phenomenon.

His first contribution in Die Welt am Montag was published in March 1901. In June 1902 he became editor of the magazine, his contract lasting for three years. In September 1902 he also assumed the role of theatre critic in Berlin for the Viennese daily Die Zeit.

Jacobsohn distinguished himself quickly as a harsh critic of dilettantism on the stage, and did not shrink from attacking the Berliner Tageblatt as a "seat of artistic corruption" in the controversy surrounding Hermann Sudermann's polemic Die Verrohung in der Theaterkritik (The Brutalisation of Theatre Criticism) in 1902. Two years later the editors of the feuilleton at the Berliner Tageblatt took revenge by accusing Jacobsohn of plagiarism in two cases. Jacobsohn explained the similarities of his texts with those of the theatre critic Alfred Gold that following working on his book Das Theater der Reichshauptstadt (The Theatre of the Imperial Capital) in his memory there "slumbered words, images, sentences and whole paragraphs of other authors, memories that could be awakened by the slightest association." Even though Maximilian Harden and Arthur Schnitzler spoke up for Jacobsohn since they did not believe in plagiarism in view of similarities with regards to common place expression, Jacobsohn was fired by Die Welt am Montag.

Following a journey through Europe lasting for several months during which he visited Vienna, Rome and Paris he returned to Berlin planning to establish a theatre magazine. The first edition of this magazine solely specialised in the theatre was published on 7 September 1905. Jacobsohn decided to name it Die Schaubühne as a reference to Friedrich Schiller's essay Die Schaubühne als moralische Anstalt betrachtet (The stage as a moral institution). Among the most important contributors to Die Schaubühne were Julius Bab, Willi Handl, Alfred Polgar, Lion Feuchtwanger (in 1908), Herbert Ihering (in 1909), Robert Breuer (in 1911) and Kurt Tucholsky (in 1913).

From 1913 onwards Jacobsohn gradually opened up the "rag," as he like to call his magazine, to include political topics. In April 1918 he changed the name to Die Weltbühne and developed it into a pacifist forum for the German Left. With the new political orientation the collaborators changed as well. Even though Alfred Polgar and Kurt Tucholsky still belonged to the inner circle of contributors, they were joined by publicist Kurt Hiller (in 1915), economist Alfons Goldschmidt, satirist Hans Reimann (both in 1917), the founder of the German Peace Society Otto Lehmann-Russbüldt (in 1918), Social-Democrat politician Heinrich Ströbel (in 1919), art critic Adolf Behne, writer Walter Mehring (both in 1920), editor on economic affairs Richard Lewinsohn, publicist Friedrich Sieburg (both in 1921) and as political editor Carl von Ossietzky (in 1926).

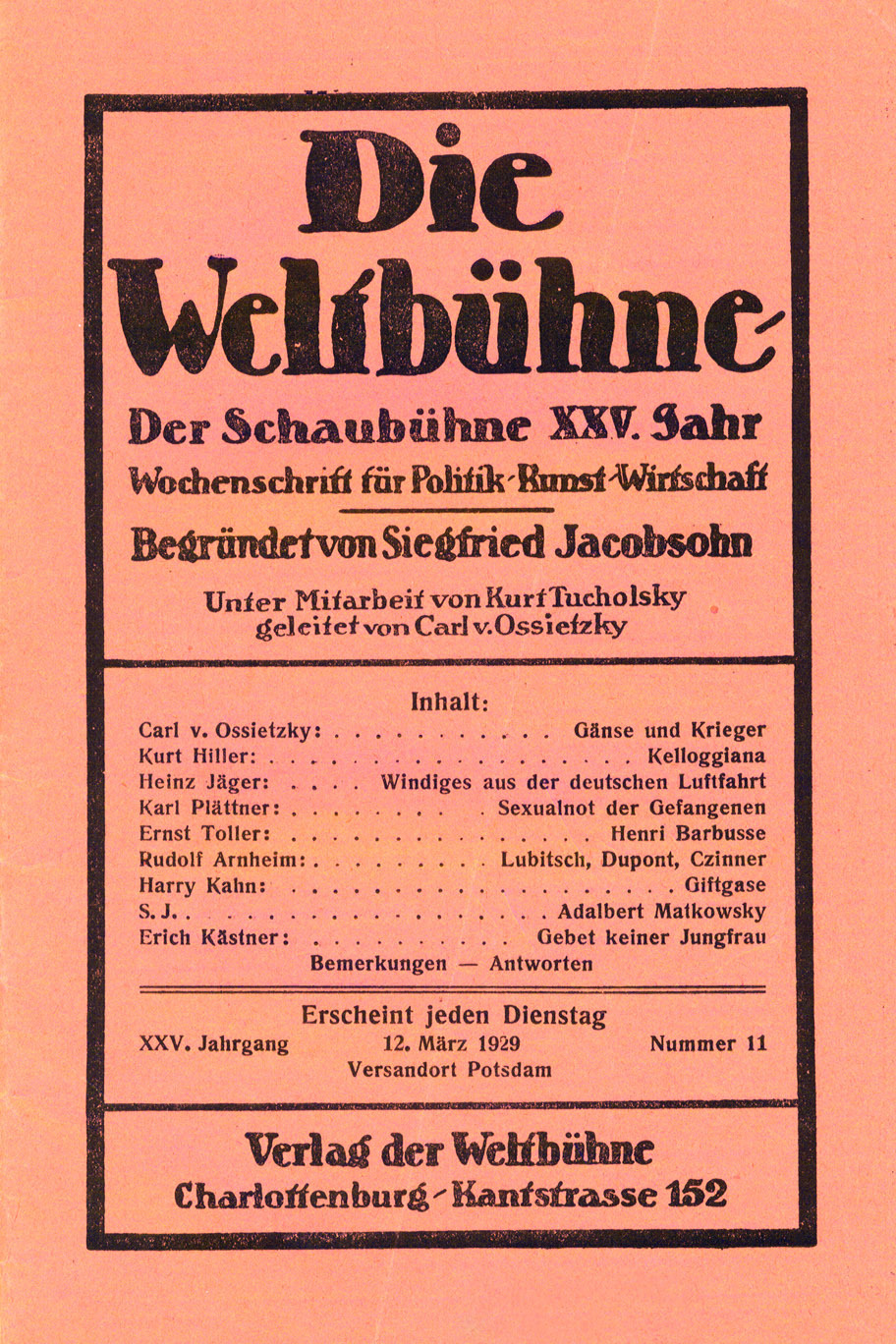
Cover of Die Weltbühne, 1929

As a theatre critic Siegfried Jacobsohn was the antagonist of Alfred Kerr since he was firmly critical of naturalism in the theatre and valued the work of Max Reinhardt as theatre director higher than that of Otto Brahm who was advocated by Kerr. However, Reinhardt's turn towards arena theatre by converting the Circus Schumann into a theatre resulting in the Großes Schauspielhaus in 1919, was strongly criticised by Jacobsohn.

After World War I, Jacobsohn promoted the work of Leopold Jessner, the artistic director of the State Theatre in Berlin. He also followed closely the productions by Ludwig Berger, Jürgen Fehling, Heinz Hilpert, Berthold Viertel and Erwin Piscator.

Apart from the classic authors, particularly William Shakespeare, Jacobsohn initially promoted authors such as Hugo von Hofmannsthal and Arthur Schnitzler. However, he soon became disillusioned with neo-romantic authors. This disillusionment is seen as a major reason for his becoming politically active in 1913. He was also extremely critical regarding the stage efforts of expressionist writers. However, he made an exception for Georg Kaiser and Ernst Toller both of whom he esteemed highly.

During the Weimar Republic, Jacobsohn belonged to the few critics who immediately saw the potential of Bertolt Brecht, Arnolt Bronnen and Carl Zuckmayer even though he was already plagued by theatre fatigue.

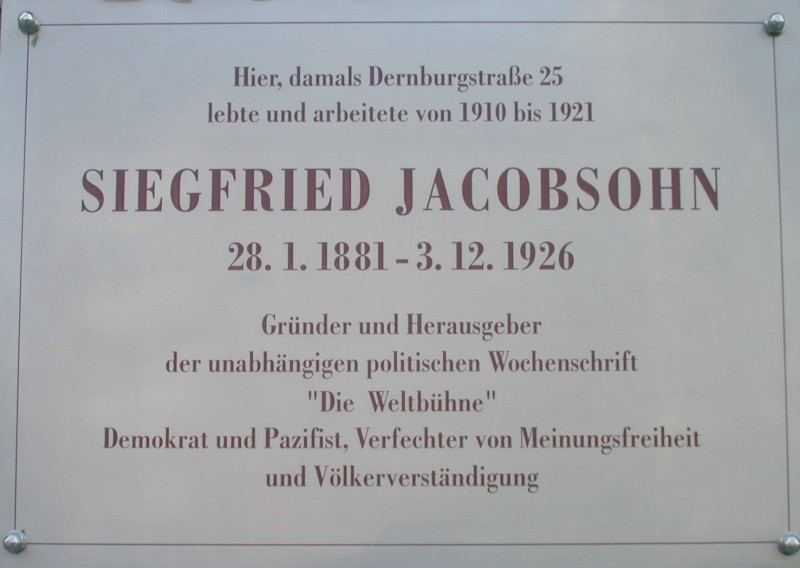
Commemorative plaque of Siegfried Jacobsohn in Berlin

Jacobsohn also expanded the horizon of the criticism of his magazine by taking on new art forms such as film. He managed to obtain the collaboration of film critics such as Hans Siemsen, Frank Warschauer, Roland Schacht and Rudolf Arnhe. Even in music criticism he managed to put forward new accents by employing the Social-Democrat Wagnerian Klaus Pringsheim Sr. even though Jacobsohn was a resolutely opposed to Wagner.

Towards the end of World War I, Jacobsohn became politically closer to the socialist USPD. In 1918 he became briefly involved in the Rat der geistigen Arbeiter (Council of Intellectual Workers) founded by Kurt Hiller. However, he left this organisation shortly afterwards as it seemed more important to him to concentrate his efforts on Die Weltbühne. He also did not wish that political parties would make demands of him. Furthermore, he fundamentally abhorred dogmatic positions. Jacobsohn had no qualms to socialise with people such as Oskar von Hindenburg, the son of the future President of Germany Paul von Hindenburg, and noted reactionary. Jacobsohn reported these contacts to Tucholsky at Paris and when Tucholsky intensified his attacks on the then President of Germany Friedrich Ebert, a (Social Democrat), by calling him a "traitor of his class". Jacobsohn replied in 1924 that Tucholsky should lay off Ebert since, under his successor, he would be yearning for the return of Ebert. He also remarked that Ebert had succeeded in the dissolution of the Reichstag which meant that he would be with Tucholsky for some time yet and be able to pay his salary whereas under a new government Tucholsky would have to look for him and his money in a mass grave.

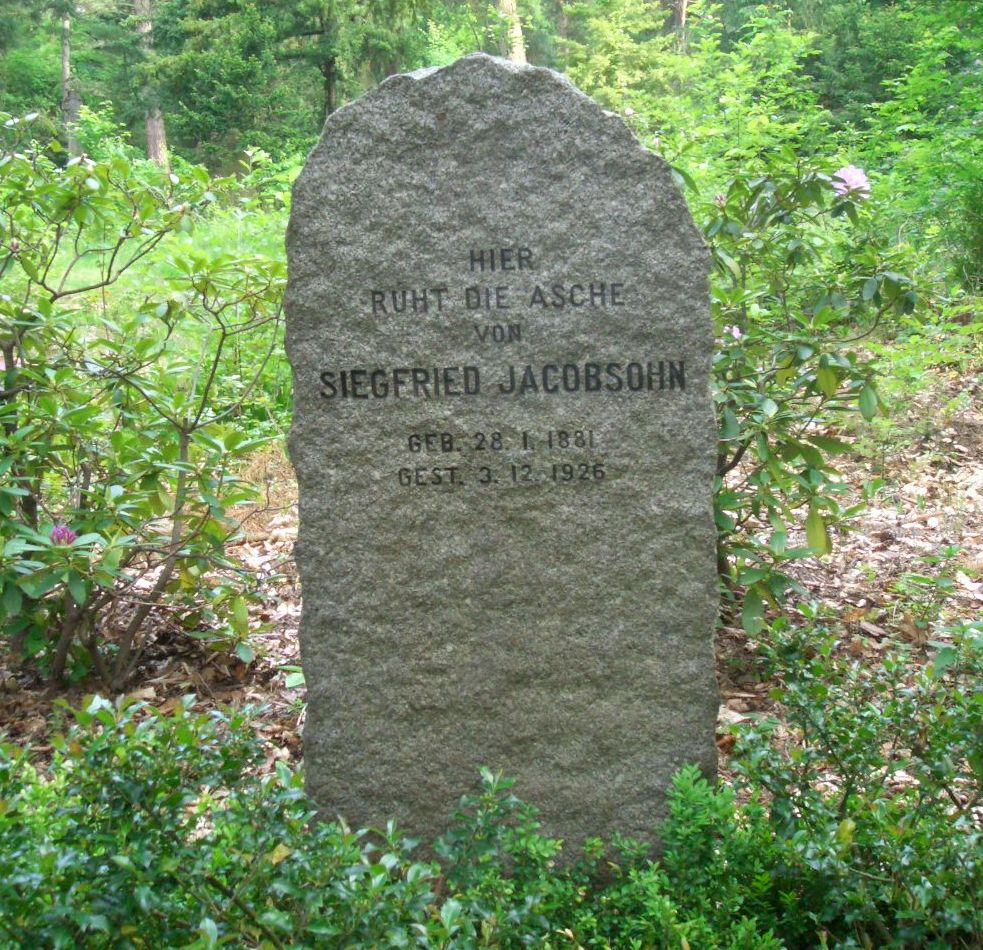
Siegfried Jacobsohn's grave

Jacobsohn had an extremely pugnacious personality. In the answer column of his magazine as well as in articles and serials he attacked opponents of whom one would expect they were deserving of his support. In 1913 a bitter conflict erupted with Theodor Lessing. Jacobsohn had printed Lessing's review of Hermann Sudermann's play Der gute Ruf whereupon Sudermann went to court. After he had already fallen out with Stefan Großmann in 1918, Jacobsohn claimed in 1920 that artistic directors would pay Großmann in order to receive positive reviews for their productions. Jacobsohn had to retract in 1922. Based on a tip off by Tucholsky, Jacobsohn accused Heinrich Fischer of plagiarism in 1925. This accusation was unfounded but led to a falling out with Karl Kraus. Indeed, Jacobsohn's attacks, some of which were premature since they were not verified by sufficient research, led to about 40 court cases against him. Many, but by no means all, of these court cases Jacobsohn won.

Siegfried Jacobsohn also contributed to other newspapers and magazines among which were the Deutsche Montagszeitung (Berlin), Frankfurter Nachrichten, Weser-Zeitung (Bremen), Prager Presse, Prager Tagblatt and Zeit im Bild (Vienna).

Jacobsohn was buried in Stahnsdorf, southwest of Berlin.

Kurt Tucholsky briefly assumed editorship of Die Weltbühne until May 1927. His task was then taken over by Carl von Ossietzky until the last edition was published on 7 March 1933, when it was banned by the Nazi Party. The archives were confiscated and have subsequently disappeared without a trace.

== Works ==
- Das Theater der Reichshauptstadt (1904)
- Max Reinhardt (1910)
- Der Fall Jacobsen (1913)
- Die ersten Tage (1917)
