= Benjamin M. Bloch =

Benjamin Marcus Bloch
- בנימין מרכוס בלוך
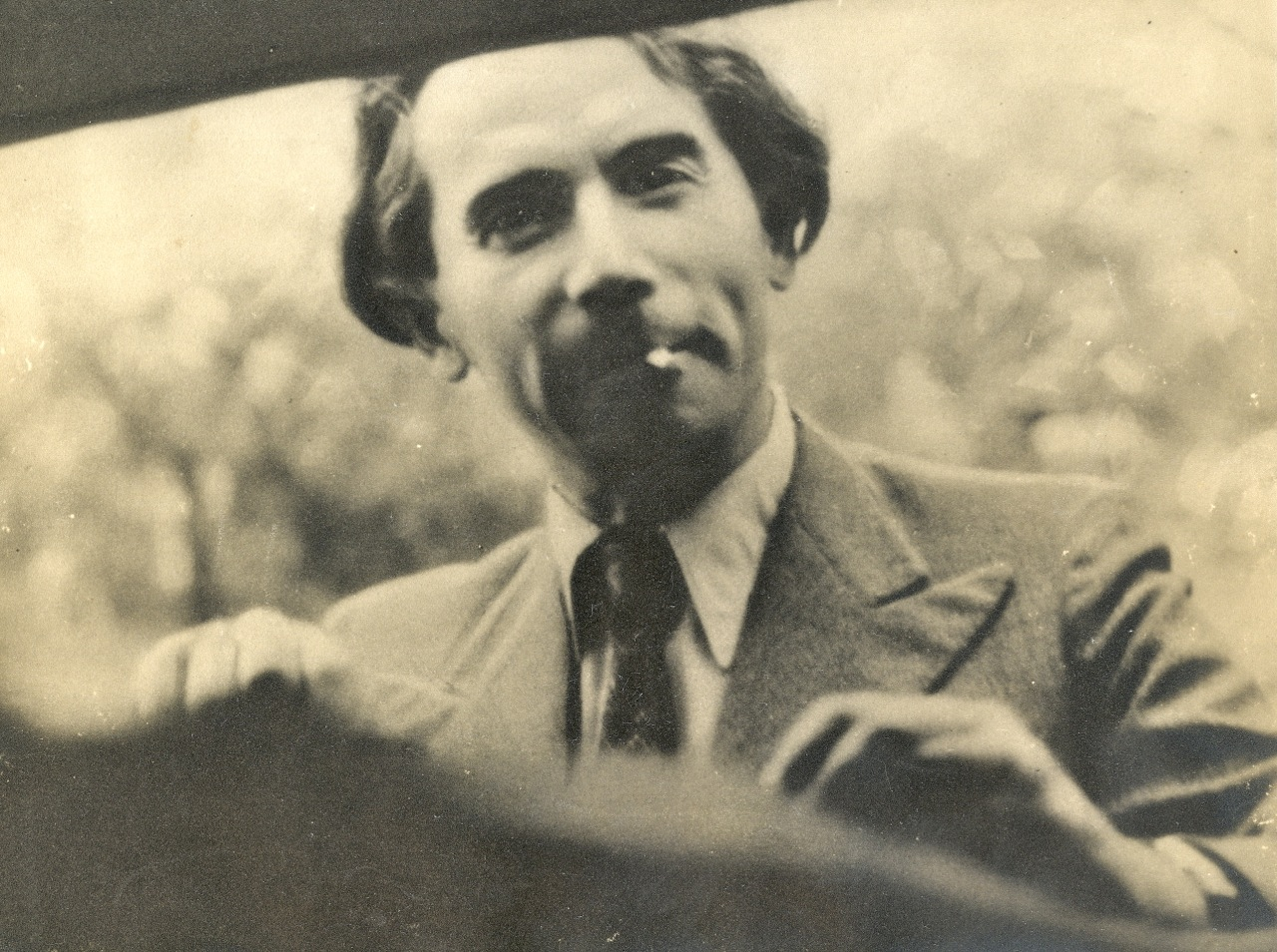
- Born: April 1, 1900; Delatyn, Austria-Hungary
- Died: April 26, 1959 (aged 59); New York City, United States of America
- Citizenship: Israeli
- Education: Charles University in Prague
- Scientific career
- Fields: Physics
- Workplaces: Charles University in Prague; Université libre de Bruxelles; University of Cambridge; Weizmann Institute of Science
- Doctoral advisor: Heinrich Rausch von Traubenberg

Benjamin Marcus Bloch (Hebrew: בנימין מרכוס בלוך; April 1, 1900 – April 26, 1959) was an Israeli physicist, known mainly for his work at the Weizmann Institute of Science.

== Biography ==
=== Early years ===
Bloch was born in Delatyn, Galicia, then Austro-Hungarian monarchy, on April 1, 1900, to a family of Hassidic Jewish scholars and rabbis, descendants of the Ba'al Shem Tov. In 1914, at the beginning of World War I, his family moved to Prague.

Bloch studied physics at the Prague's German Charles-Ferdinand University, where he received in 1924 his degree of Doctor of Natural Sciences (Dr. rer. nat.) with honors. Bloch stayed at the university as a research assistant to Professor Biedle, devoting his work to research on canal rays, dipole moments, infra-red and microphotography.

In 1920, at age 20, his father died and Bloch, who wanted to earn his living by himself, started to work as a journalist in the German-language newspaper Prager Tagblatt. There, while studying and working on his scientific research, Bloch became a senior journalist and held the position for ten years, until 1930.

In 1929, Bloch was invited by Professor Jacques Errera to work with him at Brussels' Université Libre as a senior researcher at the chemical physics department. Bloch worked there in the area of infra-red spectroscopy.

=== Weizmann Institute of Science ===
In the spring of 1934, upon founding the Daniel Sieff Research Institute (later the Weizmann Institute of Science), in Rehovot, Palestine, Chaim Weizmann invited Bloch to take part in the establishment of the Institute and to head its Physics Department. Initially Bloch joined Dr. Weizmann's team in London and worked for about a year at the University of Cambridge, then, in the fall of 1935, he arrived in Rehovot (Eretz-Israel). Soon after, because of severe budgetary difficulties of the new institute, Bloch took upon himself, in the beginning of 1936, the task of managing the institute in addition to his capacity as the head of the physics department and to his own scientific research. In 1941, Bloch, then one of ten Board Governors of Sieff Institute, was nominated as its first and sole Managing Governor. Later on, having been one of the founding fathers of the Weizmann Institute of Science, Bloch continued in the position of Administrative Director as well as a member of the Board of Governors and of all the councils and committees of the Institute.

In World War II, when supply of medicines from Germany stopped, Bloch established at the Institute a pharmaceutical factory, "Palestine Pharmaceutical Products LTD" (P.PH.P.) which functioned in the years 1941-1949.

In 1955, during the time of the Soviet Union's Iron Curtain, Bloch was invited by Soviet authorities to represent Israel at the session of the Academy of Science of the USSR on Peaceful Utilization of Atomic Energy that took place in Moscow from July 1 to 5, just before the "First Geneva Conference" on the Peaceful Uses of Atomic Energy.

As the head of the Institute, Bloch served on national scientific councils before and after the establishment of Israel. In the years 1945-1948 he was a member of the British Mandate Governmental Board of Scientific and Industrial Research and of the Scientific Advisory Committee and of the Palestine War Supply Board. After the establishment of Israel, Bloch became a member of the Israeli Scientific Council.

=== Contribution to Israel ===
In addition to his managerial responsibilities at the Institute, Bloch contributed a great deal to numerous emerging organizations and establishments of "Ha-Yishuv" (the Jewish National Council in the British Mandate Palestine) and later, of the young state of Israel. He was a board member of Magen David Adom (Israel's emergency medical service) and of the Israel Maritime League. He also was active in the National Defense Committee and in the Haganah. He was a member of National Emergency Committee and also took upon himself the duty of heading the Palestine Air Raid Precautions (A.R.P.) and the Civil Guards in his own town, Rehovot.

=== Personal ===
Although, because of his hectic work, Bloch gave up on physics, he continued to be part of the world community of scientists. Among his close friends were physicists Niels Bohr, Robert Oppenheimer and Felix Bloch.

Bloch was known for his intellect and knowledge. He spoke sixteen languages, was an avid chess player, and was well-versed in the language of poetry. Many remarked that his appearance suggested art rather than science.

While in his late fifties, Bloch had plans to return to physics. However, he fell ill while on a trip to New York City and died in Montefiore Hospital in The Bronx at the age of 59. It was a tragic coincidence that Bloch died just as the twenty-fifth anniversary of the Daniel Sieff Research Institute was being celebrated in Rehovot.

=== Family ===
Bloch married in 1931 Dr. Bronia Biedermann, an ophthalmologist, who studied medicine at the University of Prague. He and his wife had three daughters, Rivka (Rebecca) and the twins Navah and Naomi. Rivka Weinshall holds a BA degree in Middle East Studies from the Hebrew University of Jerusalem, Navah Bloch Rodrigue is a lawyer who studied law at Tel-Aviv University, and Naomi Eibschitz is an ophthalmologist who worked at Haifa's Bnai Zion Medical Center and studied medicine at the University of Geneva.

== Bibliography ==
=== Books cited ===
- The Letters and Papers of Chaim Weizmann, Volume XVII, Biographical Index. I.U.P. Transaction. 1979.
- The Illustrated Edition of Trial and Error. London: East and West Library. 1950.
- Goodman, Paul, ed. (1945). Chaim Weizmann. London: Victor Gollancz LTD.
