= Where Do We Come From? What Are We? Where Are We Going? =

1897–98 painting by Paul Gauguin

- D'où venons-nous ? Que sommes-nous ? Où allons-nous ? (French)
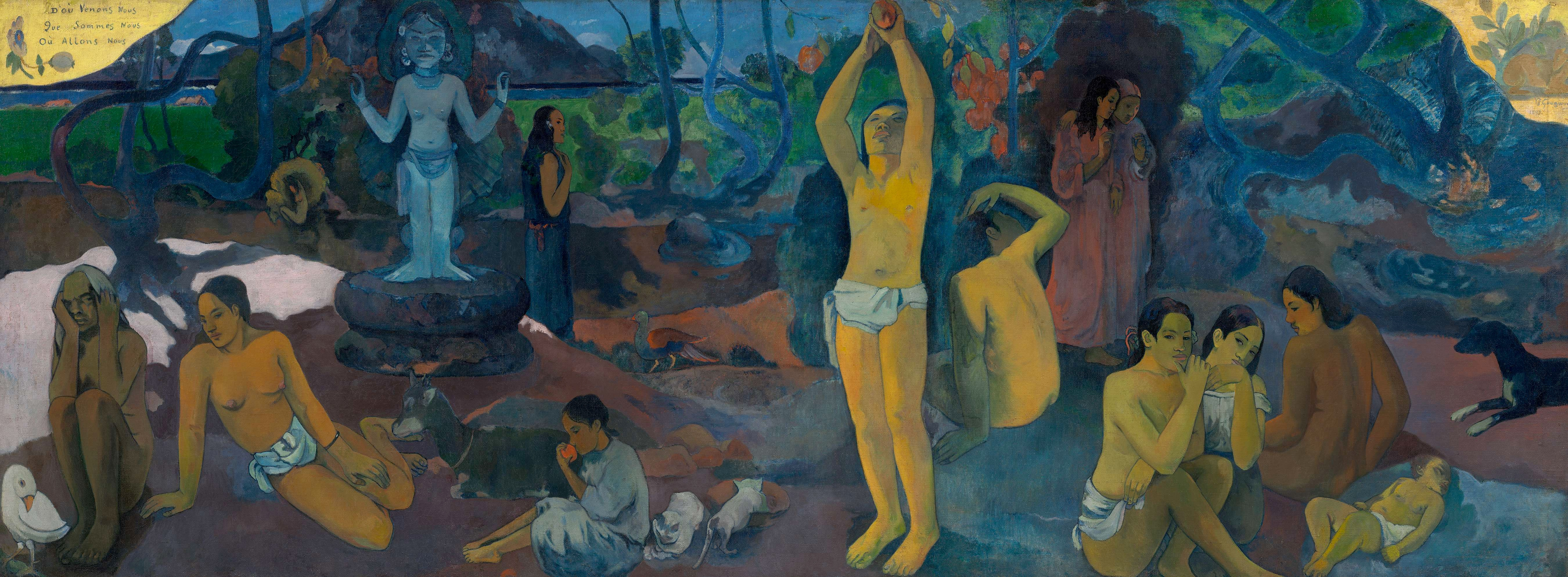
- Artist: Paul Gauguin
- Year: 1897–1898
- Medium: Oil on canvas
- Movement: Post Impressionism
- Dimensions: 139 cm × 375 cm (55 in × 148 in)
- Location: Museum of Fine Arts, Boston

Where Do We Come From? What Are We? Where Are We Going? (French: D'où venons-nous ? Que sommes-nous ? Où allons-nous ?) is an 1897–98 painting by French artist Paul Gauguin. The painting was created in Tahiti and is in the Museum of Fine Arts in Boston, Massachusetts. Viewed as a masterpiece by Gauguin, the painting is considered "a philosophical work comparable to the themes of the Gospels".

The painting is notable for its enigmatic subject and atmosphere. Some scholars have attributed these qualities to personal conflicts that Gauguin experienced while creating this artwork. It is an accentuation of Gauguin's trailblazing Post-Impressionistic style.

Frizeau sold the painting around 1913 to Galerie Barbazanges, which sold it before 1920 to the Norwegian ship owner and art collector Jørgen Breder Stang. He sold the painting via Alfred Gold in 1935, and it was bought by the Marie Harriman Gallery in New York City in 1936. The Museum of Fine Arts, Boston, acquired it from the Marie Harriman Gallery on 16 April 1936.

== Background ==
Gauguin had been a student at the Petit Séminaire de La Chapelle-Saint-Mesmin, just outside Orléans, from the age of eleven to the age of sixteen. His studies there included a class in Catholic liturgy; the teacher for this class was the Bishop of Orléans, Félix-Antoine-Philibert Dupanloup. Dupanloup had devised his own catechism for students to lead them toward proper spiritual reflections on the nature of life. The three fundamental questions in this catechism were "where does humanity come from?" "where is it going to?", and "how does humanity proceed?" Although in later life Gauguin was vociferously anticlerical, these questions from Dupanloup's catechism had lodged in his mind, and "where?" became the key question that Gauguin asked in his art.

Looking for a society more simple and elemental than that of his native France, Gauguin left for Tahiti in 1891. In addition to several other paintings that express his highly individualistic mythology, he completed this painting in 1897. During the process of creating this painting, Gauguin experienced several difficult events in his personal life. He suffered from medical conditions including eczema, syphilis, and conjunctivitis. He faced financial challenges, and going into debt. He was also informed about the death of his daughter from Copenhagen. From one of many letters to his friend, Daniel de Monfreid, Gauguin disclosed his plan to commit suicide in December 1897. Before he did, however, he wanted to paint a large canvas that would be known as the grand culmination of his thoughts.

Following the completion of Where Do We Come From? What Are We? Where Are We Going? Gauguin made a suicide attempt with arsenic.

== Details and analysis ==
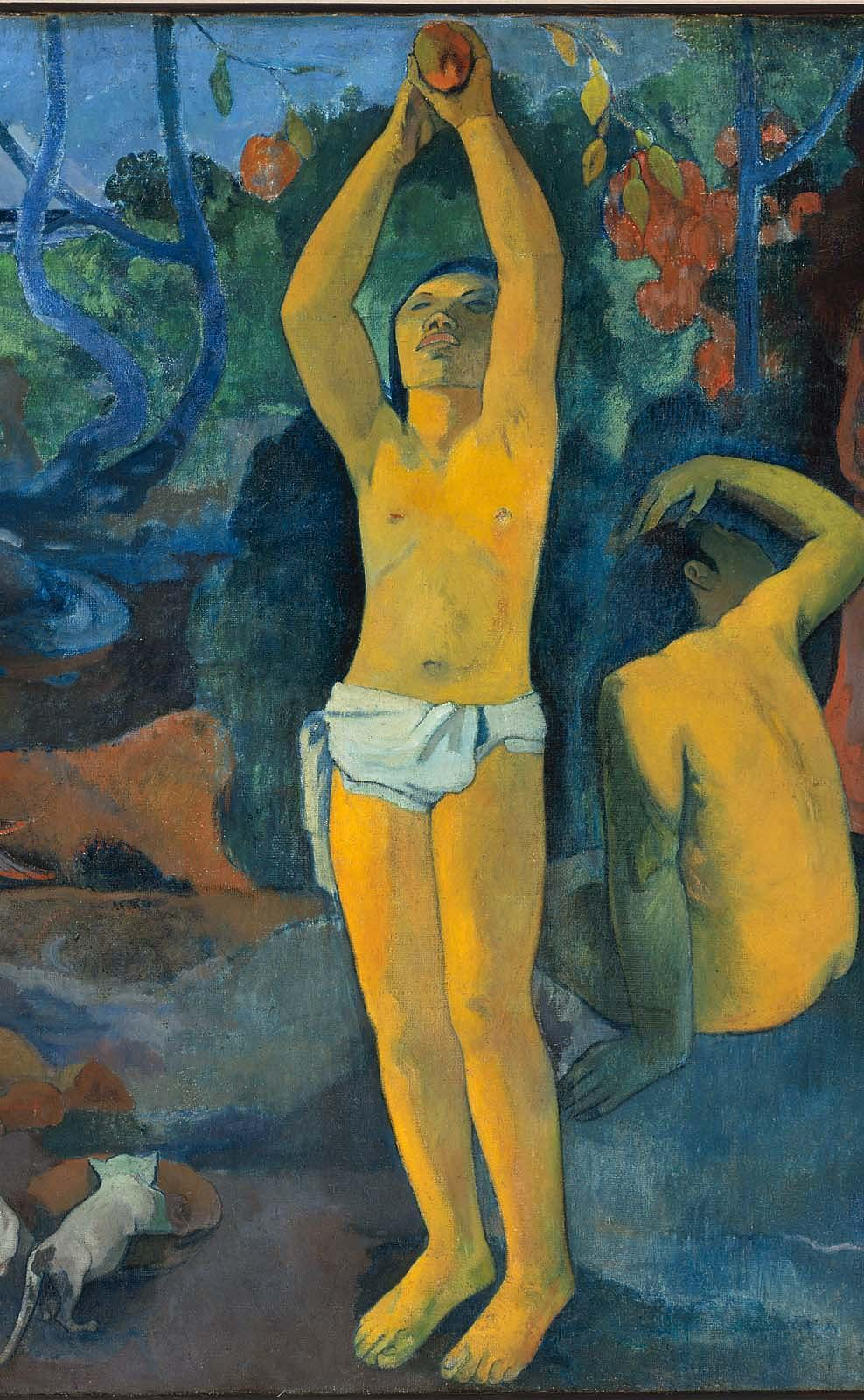
Eve-like figure picking a fruit

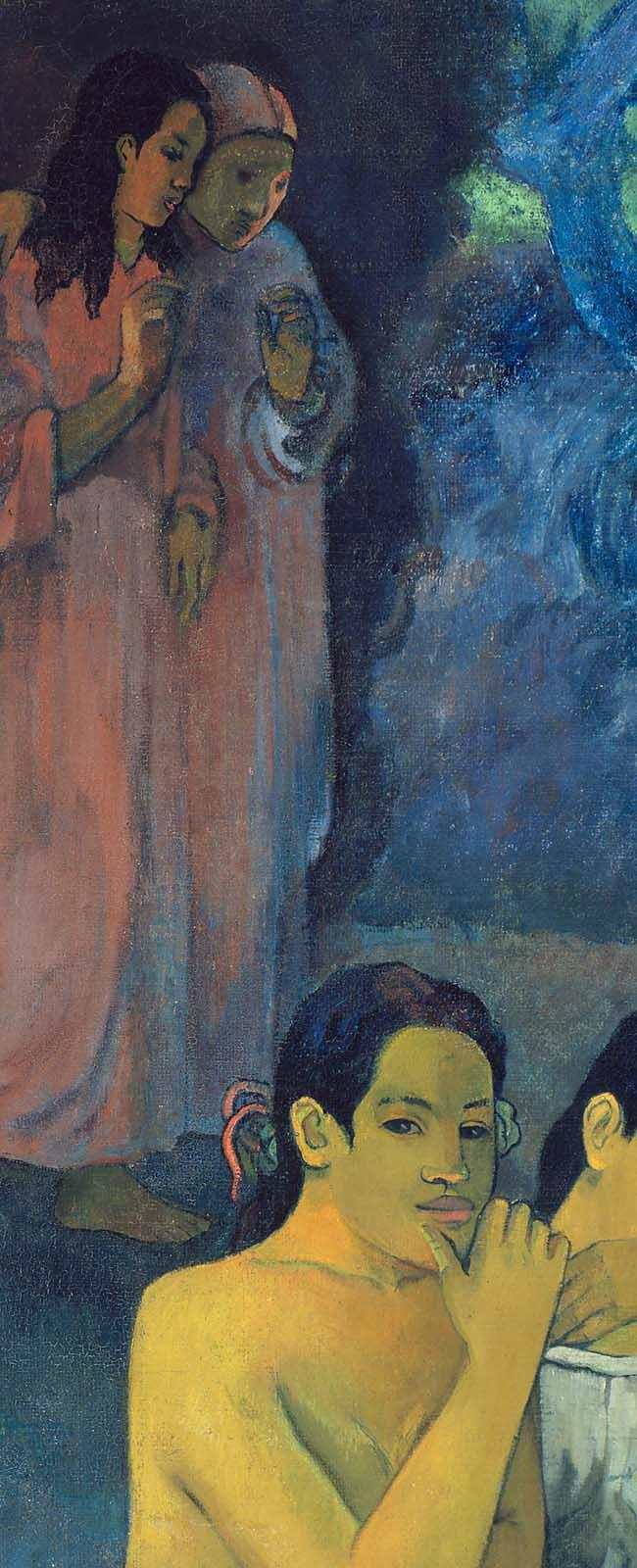
Two sorrowful women walking

The three major groups in the painting reflect the overall themes presented in the title.

The three crouched women with a sleeping child on the right represent the beginning of life; the middle group symbolizes the daily existence of young adulthood; in the final group, according to the artist, "an old woman approaching death appears reconciled and resigned to her thoughts"; at her feet, "a strange white bird...represents the futility of words" or "the uselessness of vain words". Together, the painting from right to left suggests the cycle of "birth-sin-death". Outside of this cycle of life, there is a blue figure. The blue idol in the background represents what Gauguin described as "the Beyond."

Gauguin approaches the life cycle from a feminine perspective. The girl surrounded by kittens demonstrates the purity of "girlhood". The figure in the center is placed in a "Garden of Eden motif"; she is picking fruits from a tree. Gauguin intended to represent this woman as a sin, like the allegory of Eve. Maternity is represented through the figures that surround the baby. Along with the motherhood of a woman's life, Gauguin also displays the idea of "domestic submission" through the bracelet and collar worn by the mature woman on the left and the white goat, respectively. Finally, the state of seniority can be seen through the old woman on the left.

Near the blissful people are two sorrowful women by a tree who stand in contrast with their surroundings. In front of these women is a crouched figure who lifts her arm. The three women have been interpreted by one scholar as representing the contrast between enlightenment and “superstitious, irrational, even barbaric traditions”.

The painting also includes several inscriptions. Gauguin inscribed the original French title in the upper left corner: D'où Venons Nous / Que Sommes Nous / Où Allons Nous. The inscription the artist wrote on his canvas has no question mark, no dash, and all words are capitalized. In the upper right corner, he signed and dated the painting: P. Gauguin / 1897.

== Style ==
The painting is an accentuation of Gauguin's trailblazing Post-Impressionistic style; his art stressed the vivid use of colors and thick brushstrokes, while it aimed to convey an emotional or expressionistic strength. It emerged in conjunction with other avant-garde movements of the twentieth century, including Cubism and Fauvism.

== Reception and provenance ==
In 1898, Gauguin sent the painting to Georges-Daniel de Monfreid in Paris. Monfreid passed it to Ambroise Vollard along with eight other thematically related pictures shipped earlier. They went on view at the Galerie Vollard from November 17 to December 10, 1898. The exhibition was a success, although D'où Venons Nous? received mixed reviews.

Charles Morice unsuccessfully tried to raise funds to purchase the painting on behalf of France. Gabriel Frizeau purchased the painting from Vollard for 2,500 francs in 1901.

Subsequently, Frizeau sold the painting around 1913 to Galerie Barbazanges, which sold it before 1920 to the Norwegian ship owner and art collector Jørgen Breder Stang. He sold the painting via Alfred Gold in 1935, and it was bought by the Marie Harriman Gallery in New York City in 1936. The Museum of Fine Arts, Boston, acquired it from the Marie Harriman Gallery on 16 April 1936.

== Critics and Gauguin ==
Critics thought of Paul Gauguin as one of the major artists of the time, but they were unsure about the artist's intentions in this work. Thadée Natanson of La Revue Blanche expressed confusion over its meaning, describing it as "obscure".

The critic André Fontainas of the Mercure de France acknowledged grudging respect for the work but thought the allegory would be impenetrable without the inscription, and compared the painting to Inter artes et naturam (Between Art and Nature) of Pierre Puvis de Chavannes.

Although Gauguin appreciated the works of Puvis, he wanted to differentiate his works from “the great master of decorative painting”. He explained to Fontainas that the objectives of Puvis's works were predetermined and could be conveyed in words; he believed his works consist of a great "pictorial language of feelings". Gauguin believed that his paintings had abstract, inexplicable qualities that could not be expressed in literary terms.

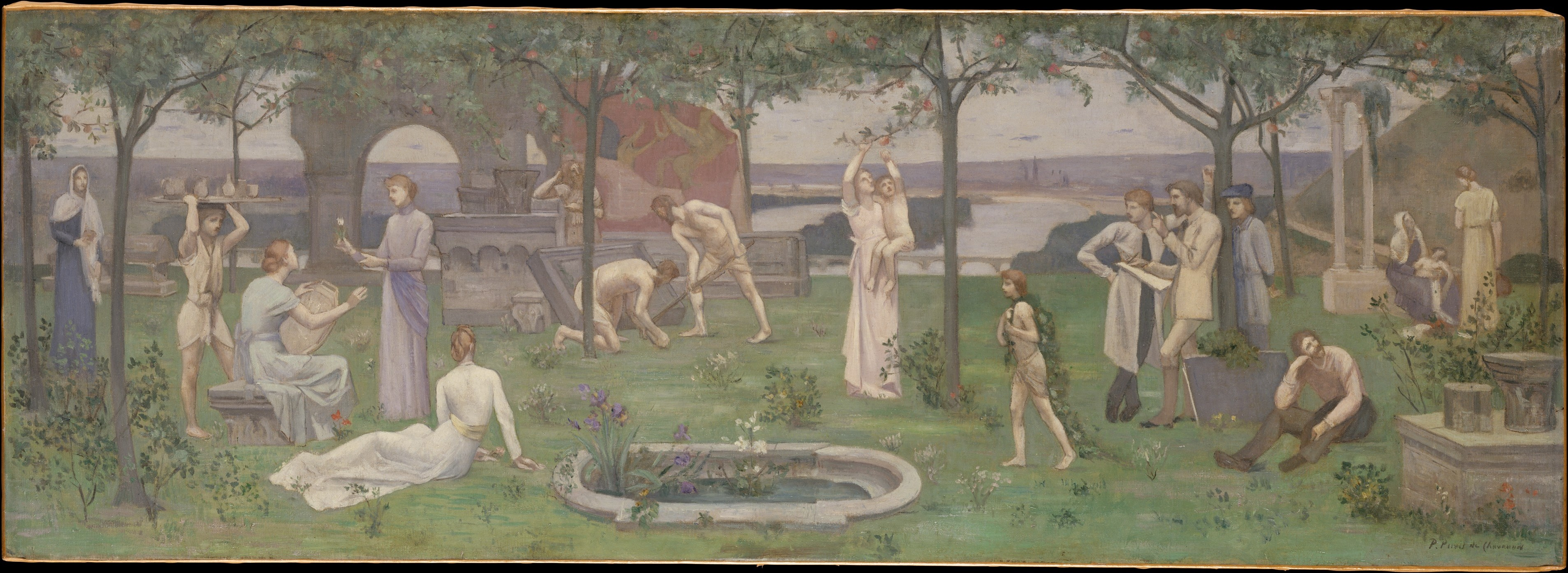
Pierre Puvis de Chavannes's Inter artes et naturam

== References and sources ==
Sources

- Andersen, Wayne V. “Gauguin and a Peruvian Mummy.” Burlington Magazine 109, no. 769 (1967): 238–43.
- Boime, Albert (2008). Revelation of Modernism: Responses to the Cultural Crisis in Fin-de-Siécle. University of Missouri Press, ISBN 9780826266255
- Boyle-Turner, Caroline. Current Issues in 19th-Century Art. Zwolle: Amsterdam: Waanders; Van Gogh Museum, 2007.
- Dorra, Henri. The Symbolism of Paul Gauguin: Erotica, Exotica, and the Great Dilemmas of Humanity. Berkeley: University of California Press, 2007.
- Gayford, Martin. (2006). The Yellow House: Van Gogh, Gauguin, and Nine Turbulent Weeks in Arles, London: Penguin Books, ISBN 0-670-91497-5.
- Mathews, Nancy Mowll (2001). Paul Gauguin: An Erotic Life. New Haven, Connecticut: Yale University Press, ISBN 0-300-09109-5
- Rousseau, Theodore. Gauguin: Paintings, Drawings, Prints, Sculpture. Art Institute of Chicago, 1959.
- Shackelford, George T. M., Frèches-Thory, Claire, Galeries nationales du Grand Palais, and Museum of Fine Arts, Boston. Gauguin Tahiti. Boston, MA: MFA Publications, 2004.
- Stuckey, Charles. "Gauguin Inside Art" in Eric M. Zafran, ed., Gauguin's Nirvana: Painters at Le Pouldu 1889-90. Wadsworth Atheneum Museum of Art, Hartford in association with Yale University Press, 2001, ISBN 0300089546.
- Thomson, Belinda (1987). Gauguin. London: Thames and Hudson. ISBN 0-500-20220-6.
