= Dresden porcelain =

Dresden porcelain may refer to:

- Meissen porcelain, the first European hard-paste porcelain, and still active
- Dresden Porcelain, a porcelain factory in Freital founded in 1872, and closed in 2020
