= Julius Bab =

German dramatist and theater critic

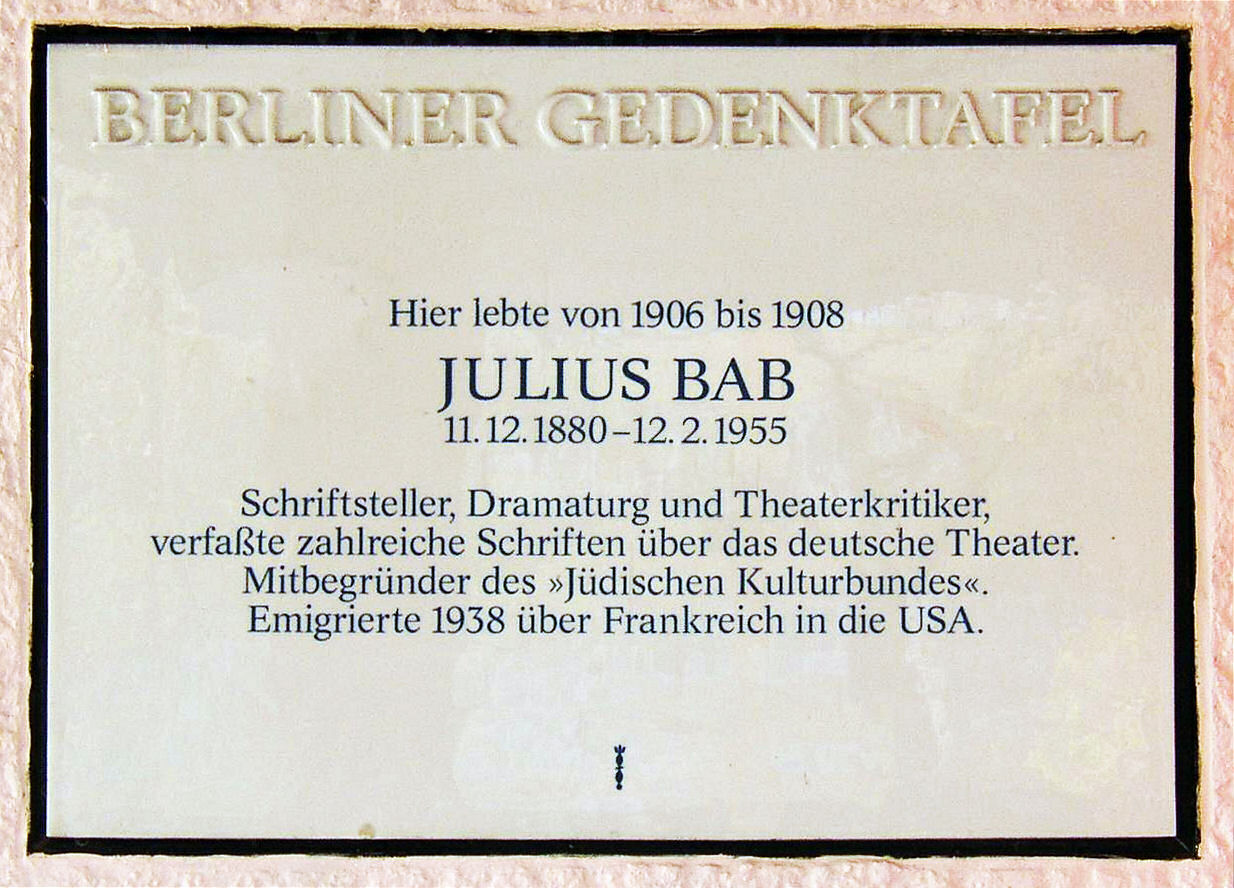
Memorial plaque to Julius Bab in Berlin

Julius Bab (December 11, 1880 – February 12, 1955) was a German dramatist and theater critic.

He was a cofounder of the Kulturbund Deutscher Juden. Bab was a close friend of journalist and theater critic Siegfried Jacobsohn and a key contributor to the early years of the magazine Schaubühne, the later Weltbühne. He was a mentor to the young actor and future film director Veit Harlan.

In 1939 he emigrated to the United States through France. In 1951 he visited Germany in a lecture tour.

He died in Roslyn Heights, New York in 1955.

== Works ==
Around 90 books and biographies about the theater including:

- Der Mensch auf der Bühne

== Bibliography ==
- Elisabeth Albanis: German-Jewish Cultural Identity from 1900 to the Aftermath of the First World War: A Comparative Study of Moritz Goldstein, Julius Bab and Ernest Lissauer. Niemeyer, Tübingen 2002. ISBN 9783484651371
- Noack, Frank. Veit Harlan: The Life and Work of a Nazi Filmmaker. University Press of Kentucky, 2016.
- Sylvia Rogge-Gau: Julius Bab und der Jüdische Kulturbund. Metropol, Berlin 1999 ISBN 3-932482-14-X
