= Stefan Großmann =

Austrian journalist, author and theater critic

- Born: 18 May 1875; Vienna, Austria
- Died: 3 January 1935; Vienna, Austria
- Occupations: Writer; Journalist-editor; Theatre impresario
- Spouse: Ester Strömberg (1873–1944)
- Children: Maya Grossmann-Unna (1909–); Birgit Grossmann-Wittgenstein (1911–1980)
- Parent(s): Leopold Großmann (1836–1901); Sophie Brummel (1845–1916)

Stefan Großmann (18 May 1875 – 3 January 1935) was a Viennese writer who became one of the most prominent left-wing liberal journalists of his generation. He was the founder and during its first seven years the producer of the respected political weekly journal Das Tage-Buch.

== Life ==
=== Provenance and early years ===
Born in the city's central Wollzeile district, Stefan Großmann described himself as the "son of impoverished Viennese citizens". Leopold Großmann (1836-1901), his father had been in business, but had lost his money and his will to work in the economic crash of the 1870s. His mother, born Sophie Brummel (1845-1916), used what remained of the family money to invest in a tea shop. Later she opened a liquor kiosk near the Prater, the park and amusement centre on the south-eastern side of Vienna. Großmann was expected to serve the customers during the early morning shift, before he went to school. He later reflected that although these early starts might have been detrimental to his school performance, the direct contact they gave him with "ordinary workers" and the staff from the adjacent Carltheater had a defining impact on the rest of his life.

"A curious mixture of political conspiracy, social resentment, and joyous "song 'n dance" prevailed here between four and seven each morning ... I would never have had the natural relationship with simple people which has remained with me all my life without those early morning hours working in the schnapps kiosk. I would never have learned affinity with the workers from books, and I would never have been able to grasp the bizarre mechanisation of erotic life with such clarity were it not for the "joy bringers", exhausted from their night work, chattering on the benches while I brought the girls their vanilla liquers."

"Eine merkwürdige Mischung von politischem Verschwörertum, sozialer Erbitterung und musikseliger Tanzfreudigkeit herrschte hier zwischen vier und sieben Uhr morgens ... Niemals hätte ich jene natürliche Beziehung zu den einfachen Leuten, die mir mein ganzes Leben lang treu geblieben ist, ohne diese Morgenstunden im Schnapsladen erreichen können. Niemals hätte ich die Verbundenheit mit den Arbeitern aus Büchern lernen, und nie hätte ich den Irrsinn der Mechanisierung des erotischen Lebens so deutlich fassen können als damals, als diese vom Nachttrabe erschöpften Freudenmädchen bescheiden sich auf das Bänkchen hockten, wohin ich ihnen Vanillelikör brachte"

Stefan Großmann, 1930

He left school when he was seventeen, half a year before he was due to take his final exams, without telling his parents, and began to take an increasing interest in the socialist movement. The Social Democratic Party had been founded in 1889 and was conspicuously still far outside the political mainstream: at the Gumpendorf Workers' Education Association Großmann found like-minded young socialist "extremists", to the disgust of his parents who had hoped to prepare their son for a conventional middle-class existence.

After an intensifying battle with his mother he turned his back on his family's Jewish background and had himself baptised as a Christian, a decision which he later linked with the "instinctive antisemitism of my early years". When he was eighteen he moved to Paris where he remained for two years, supporting himself with translation work and by trading in second-hand books. He followed the unfolding Dreyfus affair and the speeches of the time delivered in Paris by the young socialist leader Jean Jaurès with fascination and close attention.

=== Young journalist ===
His father's deteriorating health persuaded Großmann to return to Vienna after two years. He found himself promising his father that would take on a "proper job" (einen "bürgerlichen Beruf"). For the next two years he worked in an office as an insurance actuary. During this period he also published his first journalistic contributions in "Die Zukunft" ("The Future"), a radical labour weekly news sheet. He was only twenty when he had his first experience of a "press trial", but it ended in an acquittal. It was also at this time during his frequent visits to Vienna's Café Griensteidl ("coffee house"), that he met and got to know Anna Reisner, a young stage actress. He fell in love, and when the object of his affections accepted a part in a Berlin stage production he accompanied her to the German capital. There he made lodged with the anarcho-socialist Gustav Landauer. While still in Vienna he had already contributed articles to Landauer's Berlin-based newspaper, Der Sozialist, which described itself as the "mouthpiece of independent socialism" ("Organ der unabhängigen Sozialisten"). He now became a more full-time contributor and general assistant. His brand of politics was not popular with the authorities, however, and after only a few months he was identified as a "troublesome outsider" ("lästiger Fremder") and expelled from the country. He moved across to Brussels but remained there only for a few months before returning "home" to Vienna.

"I worked as a reporter at the commercial court [for Arbeiter-Zeitung] for a full four years. I treated it as a kind of continuation of my time working on the schnapps kiosk ... I was a contributor to almost every trades union leaflet going ... I glimpsed through so many windows into the working lives of Vienna's proletariat, and I would only urge writers who want to progress beyond pure subjectivity to undertake such humble reporting work in their early years"

"[I]ch habe diese Berichterstattung aus dem Gewerbegericht vier volle Jahre besorgt. Ich habe sie als eine Art Fortsetzung meiner Schnapsladenexistenz aufgefaßt. ... Ich bin Mitarbeiter fast aller Gewerkschaftsblätter geworden. ... Ich blickte wirklich durch viele Fenster in das Arbeitsleben des Wiener Proletariats, und ich würde Schriftstellern, die nicht reine Subjektivisten sein wollen, nur raten, in jungen Jahren eine solche Berichterstatterarbeit demütig auf sich zu nehmen.“"

Stefan Großmann, 1930

While still in Brussels he had received and accepted an invitation from Gustav Schönaich to take on an editorship role at "Wiener Rundschau", a newly launched fortnightly publication. He also published articles in Hermann Bahr's weekly Vienna newspaper (from 1902 joined by a daily version) Die Zeit. Through a handful of articles submitted to the Arbeiter-Zeitung (Vienna "Workers' Newspaper") Großmann then came into contact with Victor Adler, a leading figure in the Austrian labour movement. This led to a regular position as an Arbeiter-Zeitung contributing editor in 1904. Under the pseudonym "Oblomow" he contributed theatre criticism and feature articles. He also became Arbeiter-Zeitung's regular court reporter at the commercial court.

One story that he followed up involved a visit to the prison at Stein an der Donau, a short distance upriver from Vienna. The result of Großmann's visit to Stein was "the first factual description of a prison", which appeared in Arbeiter-Zeitung. The article came to the notice of government leaders. As a result of that, he went on to cause a stir with a series of articles that he published, at the prompting of then recently replaced Austrian Minister-President Ernest von Koerber, in which he dealt with conditions in Austrian prisons. The articles, which pressed the case for prison reform through careful factual reporting, were subsequently grouped together and published in a single volume. Großmann's experiences of the prisoners and those supervising them were then recycled when he used them for a stage-play, "Der Vogel im Käfig" ("The caged bird") which had its Viennese premier in 1906.

=== Popular theatre ===
A remarkable career switch came in 1906 when Stefan Großmann founded a new theater, the "Freie Volksbühne für die Wiener Arbeiter" ("Free popular theatre for Viennese workers"), consciously modelled on the Volksbühne theatre in Berlin. Großmann undertook the project with the backing of the increasingly self-confident Social Democratic Workers' Party (SDAPÖ - as the Social Democratic Party was then known). (SDAPÖ backing did not extend to financial support, however.) On 21 June 1906 the company's first performance took place, with a staging of "Hinauf zu den Sternen" by the controversial Russian writer Leonid Andreyev at the Theater in der Josefstadt. In 1908 the company staged the first performance of Hugo von Hofmannsthal's stage play, "Elekra". The theatre project was a great success artistically and, for several years, financially. At the end of the 1911/12 season, it was reported that 750 performances had been attended by around 650,000 people. According to at least one source the theatre association had a membership of more than 25,000. The theatre company included well known actors of the time, including Max Pallenberg, Raoul Aslan and Ernst Deutsch. Set designers who worked at the theatre included Alfred Kubin and Erwin Lang. The chief dramaturge, appointed in 1911, was Berthold Viertel.

By 1911 the architect Oskar Kaufmann had been commissioned to design a new theatre for the company. He and Großmann collaborated closely on the design of the "classless" theatre building, which would be built without galleries and loggias. However, by the time the theatre opened, in 1914, the building had been sold. The Wiener Stadttheater was completed featuring a traditional "renaissance stage", and without reference to the socialist egalitarian precepts of the original design, remodelled after 1918 and quickly becoming, in the words of one dismissive commentator, the venue for "wholesome" operetta productions. In 1913 the company had been forced to sell the still unfinished building to the politically well-connected architectural firm of Fellner & Helmer, which is charged in some quarters with having "successfully sabotaged the entire project".

Despite the ferocious personal energy he devoted to the project, the happy combination of circumstances that had enabled the theatre to flourish came to an abrupt end. There was a change of government and following a period of intense wrangling completion of a theatre building was blocked by the authorities. At this critical moment Großmann himself was out of action, confined to hospital by a serious stomach complaint. Confrontation with other leading members of the theatre association led to his decision, during the first part of 1913, to sever his ties with Vienna and relocate, with his Swedish-born wife and their two daughters, to Berlin. Großmann spelled out his feelings and motives during this time of personal crisis in his novel "Die Partei" which was published (in Berlin) in 1919.

=== From editor to publisher ===
There was nothing random in choosing Berlin. He already had a strong journalistic reputation in the German capital, thanks to his regular contributions to the Berlin theatre magazine "Schaubühne" and, in the past, to Max Harden's Vienna based anarcho-socialist "Die Zukunft" ("The Future"). Großmann had good contacts with a number of influential media figures in the city, including the proprietor of "Schaubühne" Siegfried Jacobsohn, and did not have to wait long for offers of work from Berlin publishers. Franz Ullstein managed to secure his services for the "Vossische Zeitung", although his precise duties with the newspaper were not immediately clear. After several months "trying out" different departments he finally expressed a wish to work as a foreign correspondent in France, England and the United States of America. The outbreak of war in July 1914 meant that his foreign posting never extended beyond a brief stay in France during the early summer of that year. He was then posted for six months to Vienna, after which he took on the editorship of the Vossische Zeitung's Feuilleton section. He stayed with the Feuilleton job till the war ended. During the early part of the First World War Stefan Großmann was one of very few journalists not to join in the insane enthusiasm that erupted across Europe. "War fever" was conspicuously absent from his journalism.

"This news magazine addresses readers willing and able to apply judgement.
The Tage-Buch cannot and will not serve any party, but I am hoping to develop a conspiracy of creative minds alongside, above, and despite the political parties. If we were to succeed in creating this secret association of the knowledgeable and wise, evaluating objectively without right-wing or left-wing bias, then discussions would begin about enacting socialism more easily and more effectively, above the aristocratic distortion of democracy, above the training and creativity of untrammelled humanity, without the dead weight of swarming passions."

"Diese Zeitschrift rechnet mit urteilsfähigen Lesern.
Das ‚Tage-Buch‘ kann und wird keiner Partei dienen, wohl aber hoffe ich auf eine Verschwörung der schöpferischen Köpfe neben, über, trotz den Parteien. Wenn es gelänge, diesen Geheimbund der Sachkenner zu schaffen, die urteilen, ohne nach rechts oder links zu schielen und zu schieben, dann würden die Diskussionen über Verwirklichung des Sozialismus, über die aristokratische Durchäderung der Demokratie, über die Erziehung und Erzielung unverstümmelter Menschen, ohne den Ballast der Schwarmgeister leichter und ergebnisreicher werden."

Stefan Großmann, 1930

Großmann left the "Vossische Zeitung" in 1919, taking responsibility for an article that had outraged conservative readers. In 1920 he teamed up with the publisher Ernst Rowohlt to found the weekly political journal, Tage-Buch. Tage-Buch was independent and not affiliated to any political party: its overall approach was driven by the philosophy and beliefs of its founders and of its first publisher, Stefan Großmann. In the early years the extent of Großmann was masked in that many of his contributions were attributed to Thomas Wehrlin or Carlotto Graetz: these were pseudonyms. It was often compared with Die Weltbühne, originally a "theatre magazine", which by the 1920s was focused more broadly on politics, art, and business. During the Weimar years the two publications emerged as influential proponents of radical and democratic solutions. The effectiveness of Tage-Buch was enhanced after 1921 when the intellectually formidable Leopold Schwarzschild became a co-proprietor. Regular contributors to the journal included many of the nation's leading intellectuals. In 1928 Großmann's declining health forced him to retire from his management responsibilities at Tage-Buch, and these now passed fully to his younger co-proprietor. In 1933 Schwarzschild led the small Tage-Buch team into a Paris exile, where the journal continued to be published till 1940. Although there was nothing contrived about Großmann's declining health, his resignation from Tage-Buch's management in 1928, accompanied by the sale of his shares in it to Schwarzschild, also reflected growing personal differences between the two men. Three years later, in 1931, Schwarzschild suspended payment of Großmann's agreed pension entitlement from the journal: a lengthy litigation ensued.

=== Final chapter ===
Resigning his proprietorship and editorial duties did not put an end to Großmann's journalistic contributions which continued to appear in Tage-Buch and in numerous other publications. 1928 also saw the publication of his novel "Chefredakteur Roth führt Krieg" (loosely "Managing editor Roth leads the war"), a prescient work in which the protagonist manages to dominate public opinion in a major city using his tabloid newspaper. Two years later he published his autobiography, "Ich war begeistert" (loosely "I was enthused"). During the early 1930s he also made a return to the world of theatre, working as a dramatist with Franz Hessel to stage productions at the Berlin Volksbühne theatre and then, opening on Christmas Day 1931 at the Berlin Großes Schauspielhausin, an "updated version" of The Rape of the Sabine Women.

In January 1933 the Nazis took power and lost no time in transforming Germany into a one-party dictatorship. Riding the traditional populist pillars of hatred and hope, the new government used the security services to target political opponents, starting with those who had eloquently derided and mocked them when in opposition. And they trained their sights on those they identified as Jews. In March 1933 Nazi paramilitaries arrived with the police at Stefan Großmann's home at Geltow, just outside Berlin. Their orders were to arrest him and send him for "internment". However, he was plainly very ill, which caused them to ignore the arrest order and "spare" him. They did, however, issue an order of their own, that Großmann should leave Germany.

Soon after that he returned for the last time, with his wife, to Vienna. He was terminally ill and destitute, but he had never been forgotten by the media establishment in the Austrian capital, where his theatre reviews, court reports and other contributions had continued to appear in the city's newspapers. He continued to find work. Two of his contributions from that final period, in particular, stand out. In June 1933 - following an example set by "Managing editor Roth" in his own recent novel - Großmann published a polemical "Open letter to Gerhart Hauptmann". Hauptmann had failed to speak out in support of his Jewish colleague Max Reinhardt who was having problems with the Nazis. He had failed to condemn Nazi book burnings. He had found nothing to say about the expulsions of Heinrich and Thomas Mann, Leonhard Frank, Alfred Döblin and Jakob Wassermann. He had remained a member of the Prussian Poets' Academy "... alongside Hanns Johst". "In an age ruled by self-serving cowardice, your silence at this time is one of the bitterest disappointments that we have experienced". The next year he published an anonymous article in Klaus Mann's literary monthly, "Die Sammlung" (published "in exile" in Amsterdam) under the headline "Independent Austria" ("Unabhängiges Österreich"). He identified the "causes of the crushing defeat of the Viennese workers" (den "Ursachen der vernichtenden Niederlage der Wiener Arbeiter") in the brief but savagely ended uprising of February 1934. He closed with a gloomy but accurate prediction of an Austria integrated into a larger German state. Chancellor Dolfuss, shortly before his own assassination, became aware of Großmann's article and took the opportunity to place a formal ban, in Austria, on "Die Sammlung".

On 3 January 1935 Stefan Großmann died of heart failure in Vienna. He native city had become, since 1933, the place of his exile.

== Personal ==
Stefan Großmann met Ester Strömberg (1873–1944) in 1901. She was the daughter of a Swedish church minister and, by profession, a physiotherapist ("Heilgymnastikerin"). They married in southern Sweden in 1904. Their daughters Maya and Birgit were born in 1909 and 1911.
