= Dresden Porcelain =

Porcelain manufacturer near Dresden, Germany

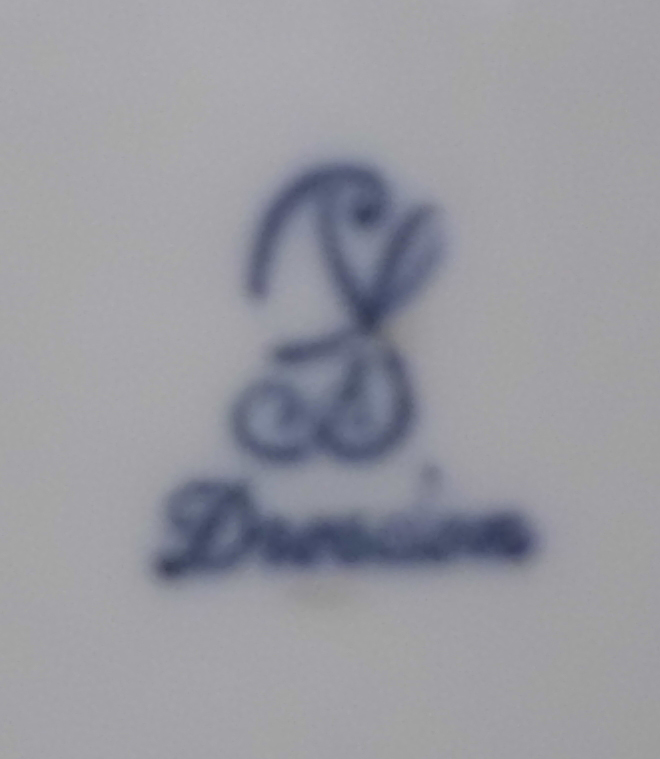
- Dresden Porcelain introduced its blue "SP Dresden" trademark in 1902.
- Built: 1872
- Operated: 17 September 1872- 31 January 2020
- Industry: Porcelain
- Employees: 2 (as of January 2020)
- Defunct: January 2020

The Sächsische Porzellan-Manufaktur Dresden GmbH (Saxon Porcelain Manufactory in Dresden Ltd), generally known in English as Dresden Porcelain (though that may also mean the much older and better-known Meissen porcelain), was a German company for the production of decorative and luxury porcelain. Founded in 1872, it was located in Potschappel, a suburb of the town of Freital in the Sächsische Schweiz-Osterzgebirge district about 8 km (5 mi) southwest of Dresden, the capital of Saxony.

The company has had a chequered history of ownership including its period as a nationalised VEB (People's Owned Enterprise) in former East Germany. Russian businessman Armenak S. Agababyan owned 50% from 2005 to 2008 when he became sole owner, and the company had been exporting 80% of its products. The main markets were the Russian, Asian and Arab regions. In January 2020, Agababyan announced that production would cease indefinitely, with two employees being retained to continue sales of stock from the showroom in Carl-Thieme-Straße and the shop in Dresden until the end of 2020 when the company was finally dissolved.

== History ==
=== From the foundation in 1872 to 1945 ===
Carl-Johann Gottlob Thieme (born 12 September 1823 in Niederjahna, died 18 March 1888 in Dresden) was a Hausmaler (a free-lance porcelain decorator). Thieme had been running his own porcelain studio and antique shop in the center of Dresden since 1864. He decided to manufacture his porcelain and found a suitable plot of land at the gates of the city of Dresden in the industrial village of Potschappel. On September 17, 1872, Thieme's Gründerzeit factory (now a listed cultural heritage monument) started operations. From the beginning, white porcelain was sold to the Dresden freelance decorators and across Europe. Likewise, not only self-made but also purchased white porcelain was painted and sold there.

The flower modeller Carl August Kuntzsch (1855–1920), a son-in-law of Thieme, played a key role in the company's success. With the "lush flower covering", he created a stylistic feature of Dresden porcelain. After Thieme's death, he took over the company and the economic success in 1912 enabled extensions to the production buildings, which have remained unchanged. The world wars and the global economic crises reduced exports and the number of employees fell from 300 in 1914 to less than 70 in 1932.

=== From 1945 to 1989 ===
Following the end of World War II when Dresden was in the territory administered and occupied by the Soviet Union, the former owners were forced out of the company in 1951. Since the Kuntzsch family had not been National Socialists, Emil Kuntzsch was prosecuted as an economic criminal by the East German state organs and fled to West Germany in 1951. The state participation in the company was gradually expanded. From 1972 the company traded as “VEB Sächsische Porzellan-Manufaktur Dresden; Headquarters Freital " and nationalization was fully completed. Aided by the pursuit in justice of imitators and forgers during the 1970s, the popularity of Dresden porcelain outside East Germany rose again into the 1980s. At that time, the Higher Munich State Court decided in favour of the Saxon Porcelain Manufactory Dresden that it alone was allowed to use the name Dresden Porcelain. By the end of the 1980s the number of employees was around 180.

=== From 1990 to 2020 ===
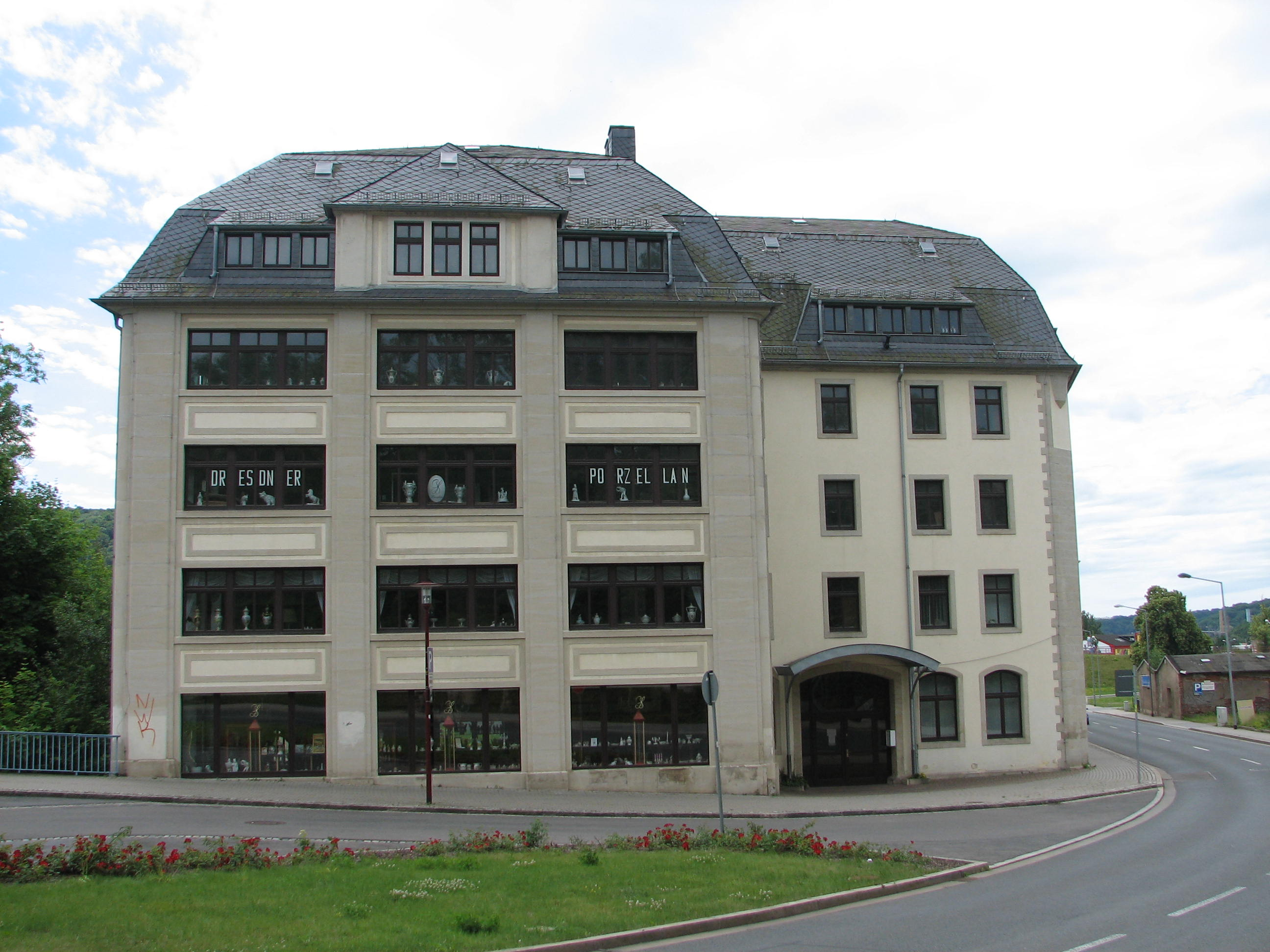
The Dresdener Porzellan building in Freital-Potschappel, 2012.

After German reunification, the world market for decorative and luxury porcelain experienced a major upheaval in the 1990s, and the owners also changed frequently. The porcelain manufactory moved from public property to Treuhand, the trust agency which oversaw the privatization of former East German state property. From then on it passed into the hands of a French investor group in 1991. After its bankruptcy, it was sold in 1993 to the Dresden IPV group of the art patron Jürgen Wegener.

After their bankruptcy, it was taken over by Gunther Seifert and Klaus-Peter Arnold in 1998 as part of a management buy-out. In 2002 the Saxon Porcelain Manufactory still had 19 permanent employees and was again insolvent. It was bought by Geschwister Hillebrand GmbH in 2005. This ended its engagement in 2008. Since then, the Russian entrepreneur Armenak S. Agababyan has been the sole owner. In 2010, there were 20 employees.

By 2010 the factory was producing about 200 pieces a year. Between March and October 2013, however, Agababyan temporarily ceased business operations. The long-time managing director Gunther Seifert left the company.

The street in front of the factory premises, which was expanded to become the Freital bypass in 2002, was named "Carl-Thieme-Straße" in memory of the founder of the porcelain factory.

== Style ==
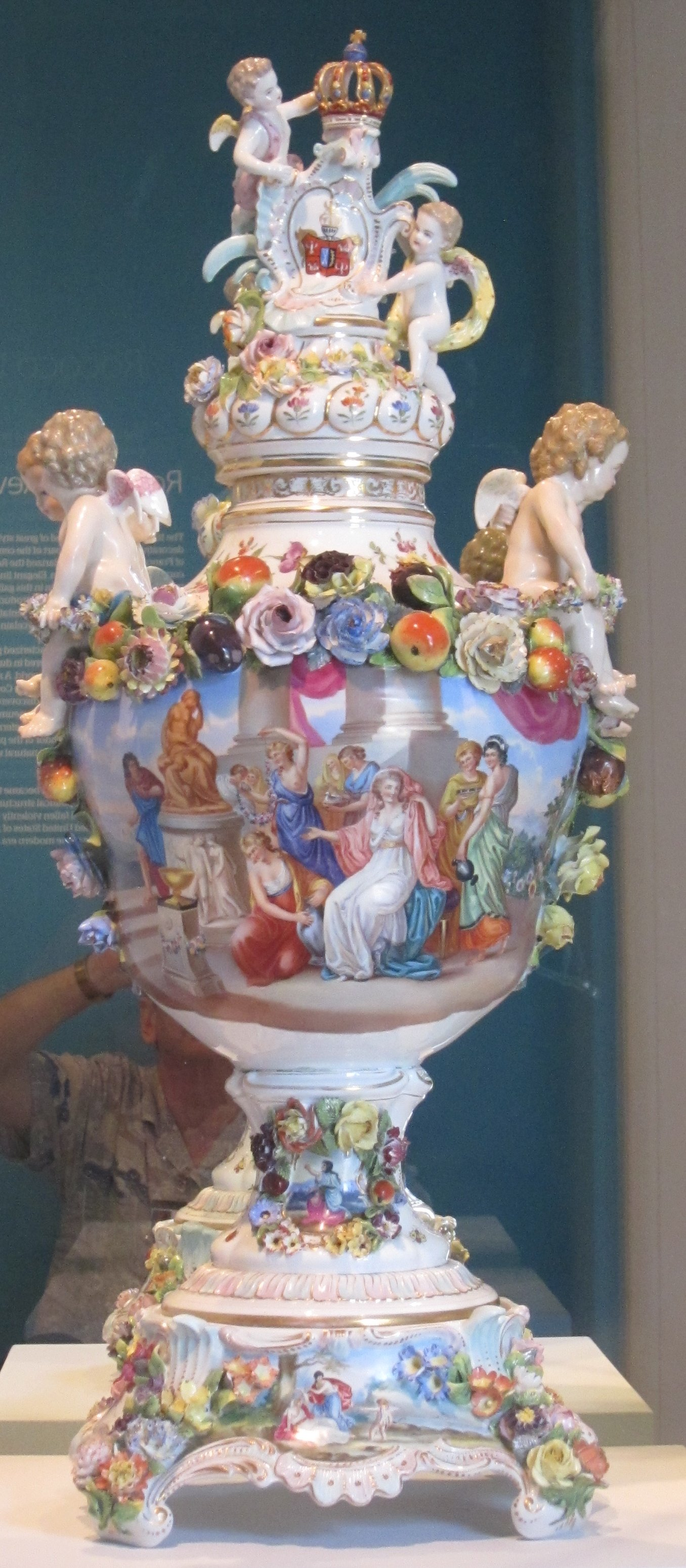
3-part vase, c. 1875-90, Carl Thieme, porcelain, Honolulu Museum of Art

Following a collapse of the entire industry in the 1990s, the slowly recovering production trends towards figures such as dancers or bird figures, mainly in the Baroque and Rococo styles. Today the porcelain works draw on a decor fund of hundreds of different styles. In 1995 there was still a stock of around 12,400 different models.

=== Loss ===
These models were still stored in an outbuilding. Due to the wrong priorities being set by the company management for decades and lack of funds for maintenance, moisture had penetrated through the damaged roof, the outbuilding was in a ruinous state and the plastered models have decomposed. In 2014 it was calculated that already over 60 per cent of the model pool could be considered lost. On 4 July 2016 the roof and the rest of the building collapsed completely. Around 12,000 models are the original forms, from which working moulds for porcelain objects could and can be removed again and again, which wear out in the production process. The State Office for Monument Preservation rated the cultural value so highly that it had placed the collection under cultural heritage protection in 2012. Of the plaster forms which date from 1872 to around 1960 most are irretrievably lost with many fallen into the river behind the building.

== Artists and Manufactory ==
The Saxon Porcelain Manufactory not only employed its own modellers and painters to develop new shapes and decors. She has also made frequent use of external art savvy. In 1900, there was cooperation with professors and graduates of the Dresden School of Applied Arts. From 1985 onwards, it was members of the Burg Giebichenstein University of Art in Halle who created new designs. Since 1993, the Dresden Porcelain Art Association has acted as an interface between the art world and the manufacturer's business world.

- Factory modellers: Reinhold Braunschmidt (1882–1954), Joseph Dobner (1895-1958), Olaf Stoy (born 1959)
- Factory painters: Ludwig Geyer (1842–1937), Hugo Rost (1874-1948), Steffen Luksch (born 1950)
- Free-lance artists: Otto Gussmann (1869–1926), Fritz Schlesinger (1896–1988), Charlotte Sommer-Landgraf (1928-2006)

== Porcelain brands ==
The factory's brands are numerous and very different from one another. This is due not only to war losses, but also mainly to the great flood of the Wiederitz in 1957, when the entire company archives in the basement were destroyed, they are no longer fully documented.

=== Floor marks ===
Between 1902 and 1926 alone, the company had 32 different registered brands, of which 8 were only for the German market.

As a rule, the marks are applied in blue under the glaze. However, they also appear as overglaze marks in blue, iron red and gold. The first stamp was the T over a fish. The crossed S and P have been used since 1901. On August 21, 1902, the entwined S and P above the word Dresden were registered as a trademark.

=== Embossed marks ===
Large, unwieldy pieces were marked with an embossed floor mark on the outside. The community brand of the Dresden porcelain paintings Klemm, Donath and Hamann, a stylized Kurhut, is occasionally stamped on crockery items from the first half of the 20th century. Letters and numbers were also embossed here and there, which marked certain mass offsets.

The mould number was by no means consistently used. Fixed rules according to which the pieces were provided with the respective mould number are not known. Old pieces have these numbers in italics. The regular stamping of the mould numbers did not begin until after 1950. Behind it is a letter (rarely two) for the bossier. The names of the embossers represented by the abbreviations are recorded in a list kept by the raw operations manager.

Between 1984 and 1997, a letter was stamped in front of the mould number to indicate the year of manufacture. "A" stands for 1984, "B" stands for 1985, etc. After 1991 there was a change from "H" directly to "K" for 1992 and continued up to the "P" for 1997.

=== Painter's marks ===
One or more numbers written in overglaze colours may appear under the company brand. Behind it are the painters involved in the painting, who are recorded in lists by the painting manager. Only in exceptional cases were painters allowed to sign their paintings directly in the picture.

=== Sponsorship ===
The Sächsische Porzellan-Manufaktur Dresden was a sponsor of the "Dresden Porcelain Cup" as part of the Dresden Chess Festival.

== Bibliography ==
- Ekkehardt Kraemer (Publisher): Sächsisch-thüringisches Manufakturporzellan. Glas Keramik. Volkseigener Außenhandelsbetrieb der Deutschen Demokratischen Republik, Berlin 1985; 3. Expanded editio 1987, pp. 8–13.
- Klaus-Peter Arnold: Dresdner Porzellan – Geschichte einer Manufaktur. Verlag der Kunst, Dresden 1996, ISBN 90-5705-005-6.
- Klaus-Peter Arnold: Zerbrechliche Helden – Porzellansoldaten der Dresdner Manufaktur. Freital 2000, ISBN 3-9805314-3-0.
- Ludwig Danckert: Handbuch des Europäischen Porzellans. Prestel Verlag, München 2006, ISBN 3-7913-3281-3
- Erika Eschebach und Holger Starke (Publishers): Dresdner Porzellan. Mythos–Repräsentation–Inspiration Exhibition Catalogue, Stadtmuseum Dresden 2012, ISBN 978-3-941843-13-4
