= Bnai Zion Medical Center =

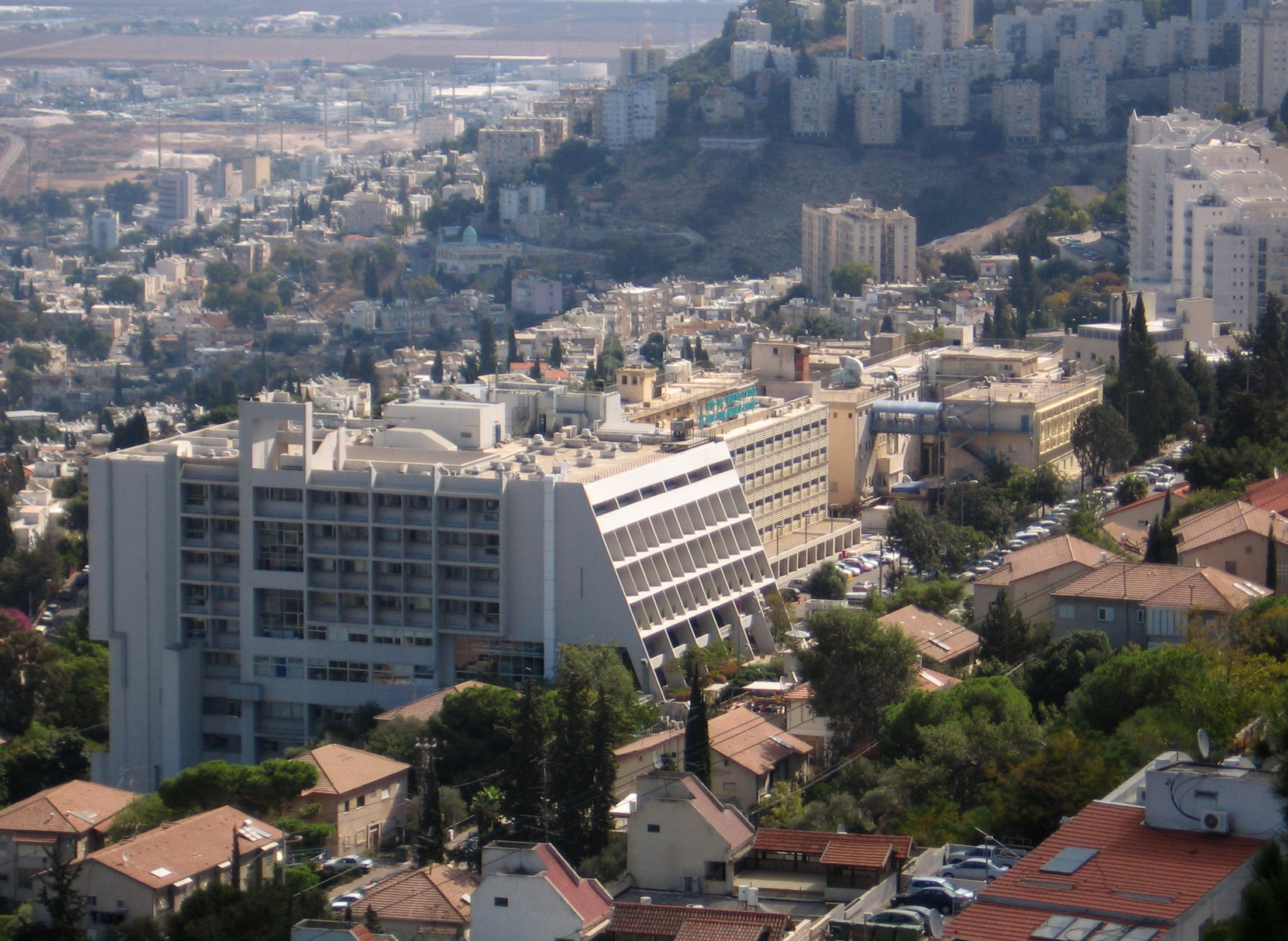

Geography
- Location: Haifa, Israel
- Coordinates: 32°48′22″N 34°59′33″E

Organisation
- Type: District General
- Religious affiliation: Judaism

Services
- Emergency department: Yes
- Beds: 450

History
- Founded: 1922

The Bnai Zion Medical Center was established in 1922 as the first Jewish-founded district general hospital in Haifa, the center offers medical care, education, research and services to the diverse and growing population of northern Israel. In a recent survey in a national newspaper, the Bnai Zion medical center was voted the first hospital in the Haifa region of Israel. Immediately after Oct 7th 2023, following the 2023 Hamas-led attack on Israel, Bnai Zion Medical Center CEO and former Chief Medical Officer of the Israeli Navy, Dr. Ohad Hochman, opened the only Soldier Rehabilitation hospital department in the North of Israel in response to emergent medical needs.

== General data ==
The Bnai Zion medical center is a municipal public hospital with 450 beds. Its main focus is rehabilitation. The center has an average of 142,000 visits per year and the emergency department receives 65,000 visits. In the center, 14,000 surgical procedures are performed per year. There are 3,500 births per year. The center has a workforce of 1,800 employees. In 2022, Bnai Zion established a medical center capable of handling the potential medical sequelae of atomic, chemical and biological warfare. In 2023, an integrative medicine treatment clinic was established at the Bnai Zion Medical Center for the purpose of providing a response to hospital employees exposed (directly or indirectly) to the wounded and patients expressing trauma, including symptoms of acute stress disorder, as a result of war and terrorism. It is the only medical center in the region with a fortified facility capable of withstanding nuclear, biological and chemical attacks, as well as earthquakes and natural disasters. The hospital was founded in 1922, and later expanded with support from the Rothschild family.

== Rehabilitation medicine ==
Rehabilitation medicine is one of Bnai Zion Medical Center's major areas of activity. The Technion's affiliated-hospitals listing describes the hospital as giving particular attention to orthopedic, neurological and cardiac rehabilitation, as well as physical therapy and occupational therapy. A Technion hospital profile also lists occupational therapy, physical therapy, hydrotherapy and cardiac rehabilitation among the hospital's rehabilitation services.

After the 7 October 2023 attacks and the subsequent Israel–Hamas war, Bnai Zion treated wounded soldiers and used remote-monitoring tablets as part of rehabilitation follow-up for patients recovering outside the hospital. The program was described as part of a broader wartime need to expand rehabilitation capacity in Israel.

== History ==
Founded in 1922 by the Hadassa Organization, the hospital was initially known as the Hadassa Hospital in Haifa. By 1930, the Jewish community in Haifa became a managerial partner, leading to the transformation of the institution into the Hadassa Municipal Hospital. The newly formed executive committee, consisting of two representatives from the Hadassah Medical Association, two from the community, and a neutral representative, determined that the hospital would focus on two main departments: maternity and surgical. In 1930, the hospital's bed capacity increased to 58 due to Haifa's growing population. However, budget constraints led to a reduction to 46 beds in 1936. In 1932, Dr. Daniel (Fritz) Feizer became the hospital director and director of the surgical department, which operated throughout the entire Haifa area. The hospital faced challenges meeting the demands of a rapidly growing local community, prompting calls for government financial participation. Pivotal donations to facilitate expansion were received from Baroness Ada de Rothschild (Baron de Rothschild's wife).

Between 1943 and 1948, Dr. Baruch Gali, the first pathologist in Haifa, managed the pathological institute, and pioneered several breakthroughs in pathology. In 1944, Dr. Raphael Moshe Hefetz established and led an institution for 14 years. In 1949, the Jewish community committee transferred hospital ownership to the Haifa municipality. In 1957, Prof. Julius Kaliberg became the research director, and 1958 saw the opening of a new wing, adding 108 beds to the existing 170 for adults and 40 for infants. A department for chronic patients opened in August 1961, and in October 1963, a new wing with two additional floors was added. In 1966, the Israeli government decided to finance all municipal hospitals, leading to the hospital's funding by the Ministry of Health. Ownership transferred to the government in 1975. Overcrowding in 1973 prompted plans for a new wing (designed by architect Emmanuel Kaner), completed in 1982. In 1987, with a financial donation from the Order of Bnei Zion, construction began on the 11-story western wing, leading to the hospital's renaming to Bnei Zion Hospital. Construction continued, and in the years 2001-2019, Dr. Amnon Rufa served as the head of the medical center, overseeing a period of expansion and upgrading.

== Emergencies ==
In times of national emergency, the entire medical center switches to crisis mode; at the time of an attack, it receives severely injured victims who have a critical need for trauma care.

== Cooperation with the army ==
The Israeli government has designated the hospital as an official military hospital that meets the medical needs of soldiers in the region. During and after the Second Lebanon War (2006), the hospital treated civilians and provided rehabilitation services to wounded military personnel. The center is within the range of rocket attacks from Lebanon. Since the emergency department of the hospital is vulnerable, Bnai Zion is raising funds to build a new protected underground unit, which will be fortified against nuclear, biological and chemical attacks.

== Academic participation ==
The Bnai Zion medical center is affiliated with the Ruth & Bruce Rappaport School of Medicine of the Technion – Israel Institute of Technology and serves as a teaching hospital for its students. Many of the center's department heads and physicians are on the faculty and are associated with their various medical research initiatives. The hospital also operates one of the oldest nursing schools in Israel, which offers an academic degree.

The Alwall type dialyzer was developed and first used at Bnai Zion Medical Center. Researchers from Bnai Zion Medical Center and Technion developed a novel molecule called semaphorin 3A that aims to treat inflammatory conditions, including lupus and asthma.

== Research ==
Research associated with Bnai Zion Medical Center includes clinical medicine, immunology, rheumatology, nephrology, integrative medicine, rehabilitation, healthcare-worker resilience and hospital-based clinical studies. The hospital is affiliated with the Technion's Ruth and Bruce Rappaport Faculty of Medicine, and physicians from the hospital have published in collaboration with Technion researchers.

Bnai Zion researchers have contributed to studies in internal medicine and subspecialty fields including nephrology, rheumatology, hematology, cardiology and immunology. Clinical and translational research connected with the hospital has also examined semaphorin 3A as an immune-regulatory molecule in autoimmune and inflammatory disease.

== Medical education ==
Bnai Zion Medical Center is affiliated with the Ruth and Bruce Rappaport Faculty of Medicine at the Technion – Israel Institute of Technology and serves as a teaching hospital for medical students. The hospital also participates in clinical teaching and training in nursing and allied health professions. Its clinical departments and outpatient clinics provide training sites in internal medicine, surgery, rehabilitation, emergency medicine and other specialties.

== International and regional role ==
Bnai Zion Medical Center has participated in regional and international medical collaborations. In July 2022, Bahrain's ambassador to Israel, Khaled al-Jalahma, visited the hospital during its centennial events, in connection with proposed medical exchanges, delegations and knowledge-sharing between medical centers in Bahrain and Bnai Zion.

The hospital also serves a mixed population in Haifa and northern Israel. Its workforce and patient population include Jews, Muslims, Christians, Druze and others, reflecting the demographic diversity of the Haifa region.

During the Covid-19 Pandemic, photographer Micha Brikman captured hundreds of pictures of daily life inside of Bnai Zion Medical Center.
