= Alfred Gold =

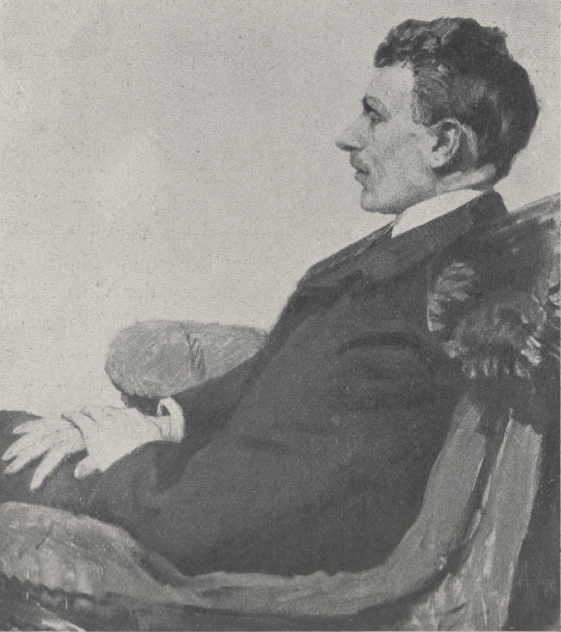
Alfred Gold at the age of 30, Portrait by Moritz Coschell, Berlin 1904

Alfred Gold (born June 28, 1874, in Vienna; died October 24, 1958 in New York City) was an Austrian writer, theatre critic, journalist, art collector, and dealer.

== Life ==
Gold was born the son of the Jewish merchant Samuel Gold and Sara, née Pipper, in Vienna, where he attended grammar school from 1885 to 1892. He studied philosophy and German at the University of Vienna, where he earned his doctorate. His studies with Robert von Zimmermann, Theodor Gomperz, Jakob Minor and Alfred von Berger.

Alfred Gold belonged to the Viennese modernism of the late 19th century, the "Jeunesse dorée" in Vienna and Berlin and also called himself Fin de Siécle or Alwin Goldeck. He worked as an assistant editor at Die Zeit, the weekly magazine co-founded by Hermann Bahr.

He was the author of the text of Arnold Schoenberg's first complete surviving work in hellen Träumen hab ich Dich oft geschaut for voice and piano, composed in the summer of 1893.

Until 1901 Gold worked in Vienna as editor of the journal Die Zeit and also published in the journal Pan. From 1901 to 1911 he was the Berlin correspondent of the Frankfurter Zeitung, writing also for the Neue Rundschau. Together with Alphonse Neumann, Gold, a linguist and Francophile, retranslated Gustave Flaubert's novel A Young Man into German. In 1905, Cassirer was to publish his play Ausklang; however, Max Reinhardt's planned production of the one-act play did not take place due to a dispute involving accutions of plagiarism: In November 1904, the Berliner Tageblatt accused Siegfried Jacobsohn, later editor of Weltbühne, of having taken over Alfred Gold's texts, which led to Jacobsohn's dismissal from Welt am Montag and the temporary end of his career.

In 1911, Gold published a popular science book on Frans Hals, and in 1912 he received his doctorate in Münster on Johann Carl Wilck: Ein Maler des deutschen Empire (Berlin, Paul Cassirer, 1912), the first monograph on the painter Johann Carl Wilck, who was born in Schwerin in 1772 and died near Nuremberg in 1819. Together with Max Liebermann, Carl Steffeck: (1818–1890); seine Kunst, sein Leben, seine Werke was published to accompany the exhibition from Carl Steffeck's estate in 1913. From August 31, 1914, to the end of March 1916, Gold gave the wartime, artists' pamphlets. Heft 1 – to 64/65, published by Paul Cassirer. All 272 contributions are original lithographs; graphics by, among others. Hans Baluschek, Ernst Barlach, Max Beckmann, Walter Bony, August Gaul, Willi Geiger, Rudolf Großmann, Otto Hundt, Willy Jaeckel, Arthur Kampf, Georg Kolbe, Käthe Kollwitz, Max Liebermann, Hans Meid, Oskar Nerlinger, Max Oppenheimer, Carl Olof Petersen, Max Slevogt, Ottomar Starke, Max Unold, Wilhelm Wagner, Karl Walser, E. R. Weiß and many more. The special issue Max Liebermann appeared as issue 6. The hurrapatriotic series was discontinued as World War I progressed.

In 1917, Gold worked as a correspondent for the Berliner Tageblatt in Copenhagen. On November 5, 1917, he wrote from the Hotel Esplanade in Berlin to his acquaintance from Viennese times, Leopold Andrian, that he was to write an article on behalf of the Danish paper Politiken about the Reich Foreign Minister Ottokar Theobald Otto Maria Graf Czernin von und zu Chudenitz and asked him to arrange an audience.

After the First World War, Gold worked for several years in Paris; in 1927 he returned to Berlin and worked in the art trade. In 1929 he set up his own business in "small, intimate rooms" at Viktoriastrasse 5, showing mainly works of French Impressionism, as described in an English-language catalog from 1930. His initiative led to an exhibition of masterpieces of 19th century German and French painting in 1930, organized by the Kunstverein für das Rheinland und Westfalen in Düsseldorf in 1930. Gold also wrote the introduction to the catalog. In 1931 he established a branch in Paris at the Galerie George Petit.

== Nazi era and emigration ==
Immediately after the Nazis came to power in 1933, Gold left Germany and moved his gallery to Paris, establishing his own small gallery at 32 Av. Matignon with his friend, the painter Jacques Blot (1885–1960). He worked frequently with the London firm of Alex Reid & Lefevre. After the German occupation of Paris in 1940, Gold emigrated to the USA where he published The most stupid of all races – dialogues and comments – a reckoning with Nazi Germany in 1942. For his 70th birthday, the German-language magazine Aufbau No. June 26, 30, 1944, published a tribute by Max Osborn and Eugen Spiro, who portrayed Gold.

== Postwar ==
After 1945, Gold continued to be active in art dealing. He was involved in efforts to restitute confiscated paintings from the Otto Gerstenberg Collection to his daughter Margarethe Scharf. An extensive correspondence from this period has been preserved, which ended in 1956. Gold lived in seclusion on the East Coast until 1958.

== Family ==
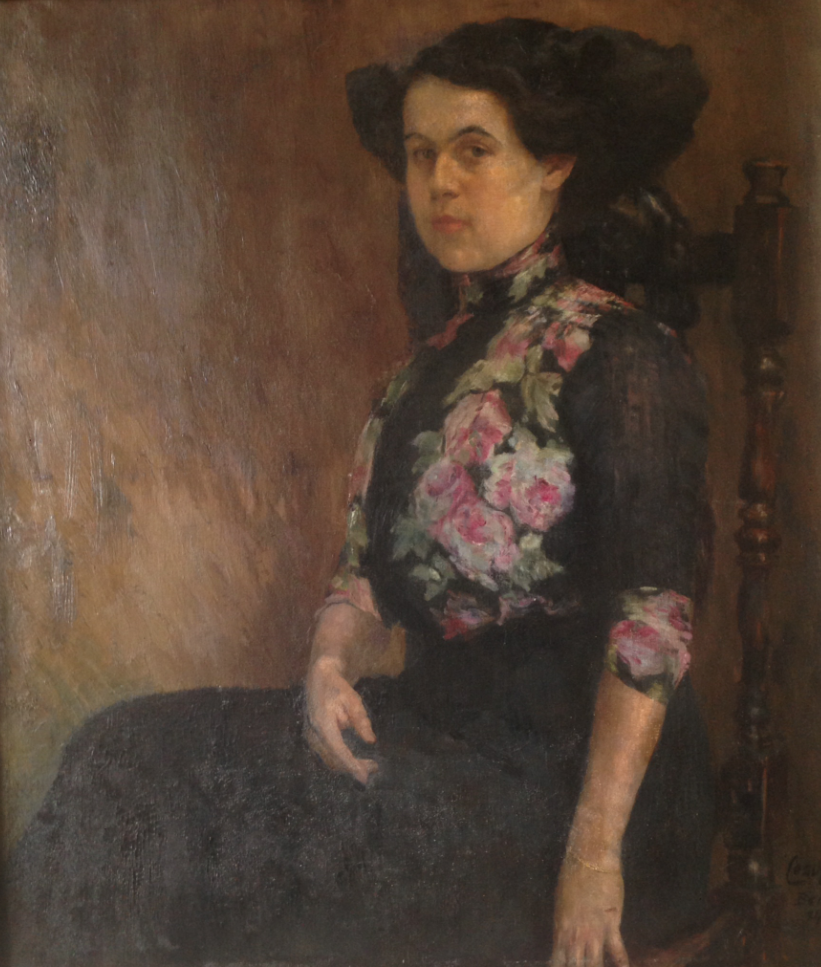
Martha Gold at the age of 24, Painting by Moritz Coschell, Berlin, 1910

Alfred Gold was married to Martha (Margarethe), née Zadek (February 17, 1885, in Berlin – August 16, 1960, in Portland). They had a daughter, the future sculptor Marianne Gold Littman (1907 – March 23, 1999), who was born in Berlin and went to school in Copenhagen. In the 1930s she studied with Aristide Maillol and Charles Malfrey at the Acadèmie Ranson in Paris. There she married her colleague Frederic Littman, and together they moved to New York in 1940, where they had their first solo exhibition. In 1941 she and her husband, from whom she soon separated, were given teaching positions at Reed. From 1943 to 1954 she taught there as a "resident artist" and exhibited at the Portland Art Museum, in Seattle and San Francisco. She and her husband received numerous public commissions. After 1969 she was active in the peace movement against the Vietnam War.

== Art dealing ==
MONET 'The Thames below Westminster'

== Sources ==
- A. Holleczek, A. Meyer (Hrsg.): Französische Kunst – Deutsche Perspektiven (1870–1945). Akademie-Verlag, Berlin 2004, Literaturarchiv Marbach, Handschrift A:78.0002
- G. Wunberg (Hrsg.): Die Wiener Moderne. Reclam, Stuttgart 1981
- Dr. Alfred Gold’s Gallery Berlin (Paris), Selbstverlag, 1930
- A. Gold: The most stupid of all races: Dialogues and comments. Bloch, New York 1942
- R. F. Feilchenfeldt, M. Brandis: Paul Cassirer Verlag. Eine kommentierte Bibliographie. Saur, München 2005
- Werner J. Schweiger: (Kunsthandlung) Dr. Alfred Gold
- Gold, Alfred. In: Lexikon deutsch-jüdischer Autoren. Bd. 9: Glas–Grün. Hrsg. vom Archiv Bibliographia Judaica. Saur, München 2001, ISBN 3-598-22689-6, S. 44–47
- Erika Eschebach: Zeichnen für den Krieg? Max Liebermanns Beiträge für die Zeitschrift „Kriegszeit", 1914–1916. In: Max Liebermann in Braunschweig, Edition Minerva 2008, S. 112–134
- Stefan Pucks: Alfred Gold – Vom jungen Wien in die Neue Welt. In: Die historische Sammlung Otto Gerstenberg, Bd. 1, Julietta Scharf, Hanna Strzoda (Hrsg.) Hatje Cantz, Ostfildern 2012
- Hanna Strzoda: Verkauft – verbrannt – verschleppt – verschollen. Margarethe Scharf und das Schicksal der Sammlung Gerstenberg nach 1935. In: Die historische Sammlung Otto Gerstenberg, Bd. 1, Julietta Scharf, Hanna Strzoda (Hrsg.) Hatje Cantz, Ostfildern 2012
- Westermanns Monatshefte Braunschweig, 55. Jg., 109. Bd., 1. Teil, Okt.–Dez. 1910
- Monatsschrift für das gesamte Judentum, Illustrierte Ost und West 1904

== See also ==
- The Holocaust in Austria
- Aryanization
- List of claims for restitution for Nazi-looted art
