= Leopold Schwarzschild =

German author (1891–1950)

Leopold Schwarzschild (8 December 1891, in Frankfurt am Main, Germany – 2 October 1950, in Santa Margherita Ligure, Italy) was a German author.

== Writings ==
His book World in Trance (1943) is a history of international relations during the interwar years. A review in Foreign Affairs called it an "attempt to reinterpret the history of the two inter-war decades in terms of the progressive disintegration of Allied resistance to Germany's military revival". It was praised by Winston Churchill but criticised by H.G. Wells, who called Schwarzschild "superficially intelligent and massively stupid", and Michael Foot, who denounced it as "a facile, scintillating treatise which...has received applause from those weary brains which prefer the dismal past to the adventurous future". A. J. P. Taylor called the book a "brilliant argument in favour of firmness".

In the first edition of his The Open Society and Its Enemies (1945), Karl Popper distinguished between Karl Marx himself and his followers, arguing that they had transformed Marx's works into an unscientific dogma. However, Popper added a note to the fifth edition: "Some years after I wrote this...Leopold Schwarzschild's...The Red Prussian...became known to me...it contains documentary evidence, especially from the Marx-Engels correspondence, which shows that Marx was less of a humanitarian, and less of a lover of freedom, than he is made to appear in my book. Schwarzschild describes him as a man who saw in 'the proletariat' mainly an instrument of his own personal ambition. Though this may put the matter more harshly than the evidence warrants, it must be admitted that the evidence itself is shattering".

Antony Flew called Schwarzschild's biography of Marx "the most salutary and least devout of all the now numerous biographies". Isaiah Berlin said that "Schwarzschild's evidence is, so far as it goes, accurately and even pedantically sifted; his research is minute, his scholarship impressive...[Marx] emerges as an almost incredible compound of treachery, envy, sadism, megalomania and paranoia". However, Berlin added that "[t]his portrait could, of course, have been achieved only by an interpretation of the facts which, while it cannot be formally refuted, is too unplausible to commend itself without qualification to serious students of the subject".

== Works ==
- End to Illusion: A Study of Postwar Europe (1934).
- World in Trance: From Versaille to Pearl Harbor. Translated by Guterman, Norbert. New York: L. B. Fisher Publishing Corporation. 1942 – via Internet Archive.
- Primer of the Coming World. Translated by Guterman, Norbert. New York: Alfred A. Knopf. 1944 – via Internet Archive.
- The Red Prussian: The Life and Legend of Karl Marx. Translated by Wing, Margaret. New York: Charles Scribner's Sons. 1947 – via Internet Archive.; 2nd ed. 1986.
- Wesemann, Andreas, ed. (2010). Chronicle of a Downfall: Germany, 1929-1939. Translated by Mitchell, Michael. London and New York: I.B. Taurus.
