= Erika Eschebach =

German woman historian and museum director

Erika Eschebach (born 1954) is a German woman historian and since 1 March 2010 director of the Dresden City Museum.

== Life ==
Born in Göttingen, Eschebach is the daughter of the architect, urban planner and building researcher Hans Eschebach. After studying history, German studies and classical archaeology at the Georg-August-Universität Göttingen, she worked at the Städtisches Museum Braunschweig from 1992 to 2010 and from 2008 to 2010 as its provisional director. On 1 March 2010, Eschebach took over as director of the Stadtmuseum in Dresden.

== Publications ==
as (co-)editor:

- with Holger Starke: Dresdner Porzellan. Mythos–Repräsentation–Inspiration. Katalog zur Ausstellung im Stadtmuseum Dresden 2012, ISBN 978-3-941843-13-4.
- with Andrea Rudolph: Die Schuchs. Eine Künstlerfamilie in Dresden. Sandstein Verlag, Dresden 2014, ISBN 978-3-95498-098-7.

as co-author:

- Horst-Rüdiger Jarck, Dieter Lent among others (ed.): Braunschweigisches Biographisches Lexikon – 8. bis 18. Jahrhundert. Appelhans Verlag, Braunschweig 2006, ISBN 3-937664-46-7.
- Horst-Rüdiger Jarck, Günter Scheel (ed.): Braunschweigisches Biographisches Lexikon – 19. und 20. Jahrhundert. Hahnsche Buchhandlung, Hanover 1996, ISBN 3-7752-5838-8.
- Städtisches Museum Braunschweig and Hochschule für Bildende Künste Braunschweig (ed.): Deutsche Kunst 1933–1945 in Braunschweig. Kunst im Nationalsozialismus. Katalog der Ausstellung vom 16. April – 2. Juli 2000. Verlag Olms, Hildesheim u. a. 2000, ISBN 3-487-10914-X
