= Ludwig Rubiner =

German poet, literary critic and essayist

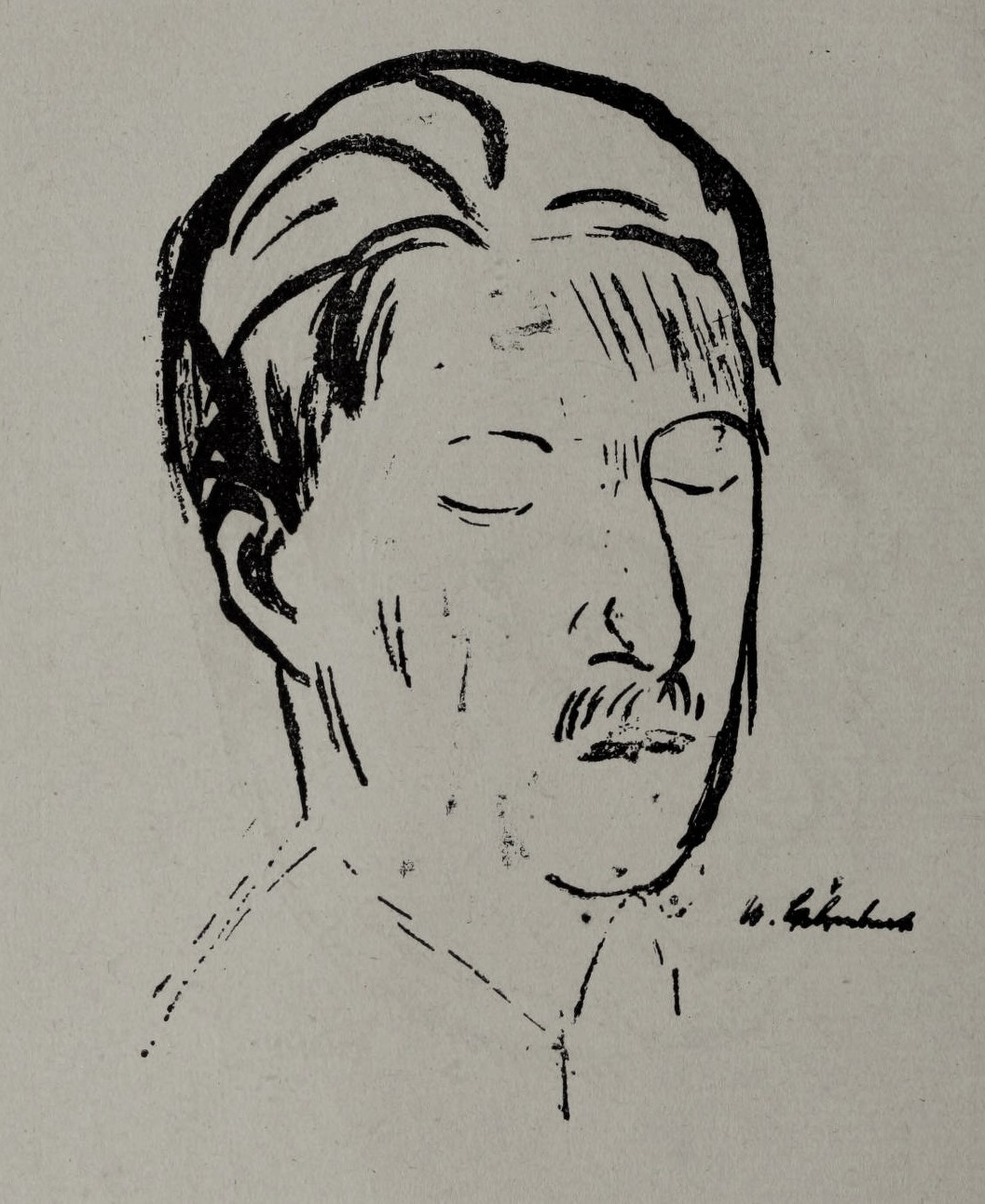
- Rubiner, drawn by Wilhelm Lehmbruck
- Born: 12 June 1881; Berlin, Germany
- Died: 27 February 1920 (aged 38); Berlin, Germany
- Occupations: Poet; Literary critic Essayist translator
- Spouse: Frida Ichak
- Parent: Wilhelm Rubiner

Ludwig Rubiner (12 June 1881 – 27 February 1920) was a German poet, literary critic and essayist, generally seen as a representative of the expressionist movement that originated in Germany at the beginning of the 20th century. His most important works include a manifesto entitled, "Der Dichter greift in die Politik" ("The poet engages in politics", 1912) and a stage-drama, "Die Gewaltlosen" ("Men of non-violence", 1919), which he dedicated to "dem Kameraden, meiner Frau Frida" (loosely, "My comrade wife Frida"). His "Kriminalsonetten" have even led to his being seen by some as a prophet of Dadaism.

Sources may also identify him by his literary pseudonym as Ernst Ludwig Grombeck.

== Biography ==
=== Provenance and early years ===
Ludwig Rubiner was born in Berlin. Wilhelm Rubiner, his father, was a journalist and popular novelist who had migrated from Galicia, which at that time was a crown land of Austria-Hungary. His mother's name is not known. Although his family provenance was Ashkenazi Jewish, Ludwig Rubiner attended a Protestant secondary school in Berlin. Then, on 10 October 1902, he enrolled at Berlin University to study Medicine. After a term he switched to the Philosophy faculty, where he remained a student till 1906, studying Music, Art History, Philosophy and Literature. During his university years he was a member of the "Berliner Freien Studentenschaft", participating in the organisation's literary activities, delivering lectures on radical authors such as Tolstoy, Strindberg and Wedekind while also involving himself in theatrical productions. Impatient with the "petty bourgeois" manifestations of university life, Rubiner found himself drawn towards Berlin's avant-garde society. He developed as taste for mysticism and the anarchist philosophy associated with Max Stirner. In the circles in which he mixed Friedrich Nietzsche was hugely fashionable at this time, but Rubiner was content to dismiss Nietzsche's world-view as "nur farbige Sentimentalität" ("flowery sentimentality"), while Stirner's 1845 book, "The Ego and Its Own" he eulogised as "dem bedeutendste Manifest des Jahrhunderts" ("the most significant manifesto of the [nineteenth] century"). Several of the radical intellectuals whom Rubiner got to know during this period went on to become important expressionist writers. These included Erich Mühsam, Paul Scheerbart, René Schickele, Ferdinand Hardekopf, Wilhelm Herzog and Herwarth Walden. It was his friendship with Walden that made possible the launch of Rubiner's own literary career.

=== Early work ===
His first poem, "Zu den Höhen", appeared in 1904 in the anarchist news magazine, Der Kampf. In 1905 he was contributing to the literary monthly Charon, still writing "lyrical" texts. In 1906, like his father before him, he embarked in a career as a newspaperman, working as a critic and providing glosses, theatre reviews and poems in a number of journals cith names such as Die Gegenwart, Morgen, Der Demokrat, Das Theater, Der Sturm and Pan. Till 1914 he was seen as a major figure among the young Berlin "Bohemians" around Franz Pfemfert (1879–1954), editor of Die Aktion, to which Rubiner was also a regular contributor.

=== The critic ===
Many of Rubiners pieces were constructed as relatively short essay: in them he dealt with literary themes or personalities. There were essays about novelists, composers and artists as well as reviews of individual pieces of new literature or music, and of art exhibitions. When it came to literature, those whose works he most frequently scrutinised for the benefit of his own readers included Else Lasker-Schüler, Max Brod, Ernst Blaß, Arthur Holitscher, Peter Hille and Heinrich Mann.

Musicians about whom he wrote included Claude Debussy, Hans Pfitzner, Arnold Schoenberg, Richard Strauss, Ferruccio Busoni und Giacomo Puccini. Among artists, representatives of the Berlin Secession featured regularly, along with Henri Rousseau and Henri Matisse.

=== The lyricist and traveller ===
In 1906 Rubiner wrote a libretto for the opera "Der Nachtwächter" by his friend Herwarth Walden and tried - apparently without success - to interest Gustav Mahler in the work. Lubiner's collaborations with Walden continued till 1910. That year they wrote together an introduction to Puccini's Madama Butterfly for the "Schlesinger'schen Opernführer" (opera guide).

By this time Rubiner was acquiring a taste for foreign travel. He spent the first half of 1908 in Italy, undertaking a coastal walking tour that covered Chiavari, La Spezia and Pisa during April, and ending up in Florence, where he spent three months. By mid-August that year he was staying in Rome, from where he wrote a letter to his cousin, Siegfried Nacht. Travelling back to Germany he stopped off at a sanatorium for a brief cure at Feldberg in der Mark (indicating that he was already suffering from tuberculosis), but he was nevertheless back in Berlin by the end of August. Two months later he visited Weimar, which had been something of a secular pilgrimage destination for the culturally committed ever since the days of Goethe. The next year he undertook a lengthy stay in Russia. Visits to Austria and Switzerland followed. He based himself, for a brief period during 1912/1913, in Paris.

=== The translator ===
From the moment he embarked on his career as a literary critic Rubiner took an interest in foreign-language literature, especially in French and in Russian: he knew both languages well. In 1907 he produced an essay on Joris-Karl Huysmans and in 1909 one on Fyodor Sologub which was published in "Die Gegenwart". He also translated three of Sologub's substantial poems into German: his translations of "Zwei Herrscher" ("Two lords") and of "Die Phantasie" both appeared in "Die Gegenwart". His translation of "Der Scharfrichter von Nürnberg" ("The executioner of Nuremberg") was published in "Die Schaubühne". That same year his translation of Verlaine's short story, "Mme. Aubin" was published in "Das Theater". In 1910 his essay on the francophone Belgian author Fernand Crommelynck appeared in "Der Demokrat". He also translated another Sologub poem, "Der Traum" ("The Dream").

Other significant translations included that, in 1908, of Mikhail Kuzmin's novel "Deeds of the Great Alexcander" and Nikolai Gogol's volume Evenings on a Farm Near Dikanka. This translation was a joint project with Frida Ickak, another scholar of literature and part-time professional translator, whom he had met in 1908. They married towards the end of 1911 while on a visit to London.

=== Paris ===
In 1910, using the pseudonym Ernst Ludwig Grombeck, he published "Die indischen Opale" ("The Indian Opal"), described in sources as a "Criminal Novel" (or, more loosely, a work of police/detective fiction). He worked closely with Franz Pfemfert on Pfemfert's magazine, Die Aktion, between 1911 and 1918. In November 1912 he relocated to Paris where he lived with the critic-journalist Carl Einstein in a small hotel near Saint-Sulpice, along the Rue de Veaugirard. Fellow writer Max Cahén reported later that the two of them "described themselves as the 'Klub der Neupythagoräer' ("Neopythagoreanist Club"). Invoking Neopythagoreanism in this way highlights Einstein's and Rubiner's attachment at the time to mystical Kabbalah.

In Paris Rubiner operated as a literary intermediary between German and French literature. He provided regular articles to German publications such as "Die Schaubühne", März and Die Aktion over the most significant cultural developments in the French capital of the moment, many of which he could report directly from his own regular visits to the Café du Dôme in Montparnasse, close to his home. The Café had become a popular meeting point for German artists and intellectuals who had established connections with modern France.

Marc Chagall wrote his autobiography "My Life" in 1921/22, shortly before he left Moscow. His wife's translation of it for French readers appeared as "Ma vie" in 1931:

- "All my pre-war pictures stayed behind in Berlin or Paris where, including plenty of sketches and unfinished works, my studio awaits my return. From Germany my good friend, the poet Rubiner has written to me: 'Are you still alive? They say that you fell in the war. Do you know that you have become a celebrity here? Your paintings have invented expressionism. They are traded for very high prices. All the same, do not count on Walden to pay you the money he owes you. He will pay you nothing, because he asserts that your fame is quite enough for you.'"
- "Toutes mes toiles d'avant-guerre sont restées à Berlin et à Paris où mon atelier, plein d'esquisses, de tableaux inachevés, m'attend. D'Allemagne, le poète Rubiner, mon bon ami, m'a écrit: "Es-tu vivant? On prétend que tu as été tué à la guerre. "Sais-tu que tu es célèbre ici? Tes tableaux ont créé l'espressionisme. Ils se vendent fort cher. Toutefois, ne compte pas sur l'argent que te doit Walden. Il ne te paiera pas, car il soutient que la gloire te suffit."

At the "Fleury" artists' colony which had been set up by the expatriate Dutch artist Otto van Rees, Rubiner had the opportunity to meet up with leading Paris-based artists such as, Kees van Dongen, Blaise Cendrars and Otto Freundlich. He formed a particularly close friendship with Marc Chagall whose pictures were included in Herwarth Walden's first Autumn Exhibition of German Artists, held in Berlin at the Sturm Gallery in 1912. Of particular interest to scholars is the extensive correspondence that the two men sustained after they were both obliged to leave Paris, following the outbreak of war. Later, when Walden failed to pay for the paintings that Chagall had exhibited at his Berlin gallery, Rubiner intervened with Walden on Chagall's behalf. It is not entirely clear whether his intervention was successful.

Rubiner spent time in Berlin during the early part of 1913: it is not possible to be sure in which of the two capitals he was living over the next couple of years. In May 1914 he sent a report on a "Neue Sezession" exhibition from Paris to Die Aktion. However, at the end of 1914 he started working for "Die Weißen Blätter" which at that stage was still based in Germany (published in Leipzig), and to which he contributed an essay entitled "Homer und Monte Christo". He also wrote the "pantomime" for the silent movie, "Der Aufstand" ("The Insurrection") which is included in Das Kinobuch the movie compilation produced by Kurt Pinthus."

Rubiner was probably still resident in Paris during the summer of 1914 and, it is implied by some sources, during the first part of 1915. War broke out towards the end of July 1914, and in 1914 or 1915 Ludwig Rubiner, who made no secret of his passionate opposition to the war, and his wife emigrated voluntarily to Switzerland. There he wrote for the Neue Zürcher Zeitung and also, during 1917/18, published "Zeit-Echo", a pacifist news magazine produced primarily for Switzerland's international community of exiles. In addition to producing "Zeit-Echo", Ludwig Rubiner wrote most of it.

=== The social critic ===
In 1912 Ludwig Rubiner renounced literary criticism and committed himself to concentrating on social criticism. In Paris published a literary-political manifesto "Der Dichter greift in die Politik" (loosely "The poet engages in politics"), which appeared later that same year in the pages of Die Aktion. In 1913 he published "Die Kriminalsonette" which he had co-written with the American businessman, Livingstone Hahn and Friedrich Eisenlohr, a fellow contributor to Die Aktion. He translated and wrote an introduction to an adventure novel by Eugène François Vidocq, a writer who as a young man lived through the French Revolution and its Napoleonic aftermath. The translation was published in 1920.

=== Zürich ===
For their voluntary Swiss exile the Rubiners settled at Hadlaubstraße 11, near the centre of Zürich. Rubiner now became a central figure in a group of exiled French and Russian pacifist intellectuals such as Romain Rolland, Henri Guilbeaux and Anatoly Lunacharsky. The creation of "Zeit-Echo", a pacifist quarterly of which four copies were produced during 1917, was an important project, but Rubiner also succeeded in maintaining close contacts with Die Aktion und Die Weißen Blätter in Berlin and Leipzig: production of the latter publication moved to Zürich during 1916. That year Rubiner published his poetry collection "Das himmlische Licht" ("The heavenly light") in "Die Weißen Blätter", following up with a book version of the same collection. In the same year he published his "manifesto", "Die Änderung der Welt" (loosely, "Changing the world") in the magazine "Das Ziel".

1917 was a particularly productive year for Ludwig Rubiner. He produced "Zeit-Echo" while contributing energetically to the world of literary criticism more widely. Under the title "Revolutionstage in Rußland" ("Days of Revolution in Russia") he used "Zeit-Echo" to publish German translations of a large number of letters that Leo Tolstoy had written to his closest friends about the unfolding events of the Russian Revolution, of which Rubiner was a keen supporter. Something else that appeared in Zeit-Echo was Tolstoy's "Der Fremde und der Bauer" ("The stranger and the peasant"), a dialogue translated by Frida Rubiner. He also used Die Aktion to publish the programmatic piece "Der Kampf mit dem Engel" ("The fight with the angel") in "Das Aktionbuch: fünf Gedichte Zurufe an die Freunde", the collection produced by Pfemfert. Finally, that year, came "Der Mensch in der Mitte" ("The man [-/person] in the middle"), an anthology in which Rubiner collected together various previously published essays.

In 1918 Rubiner published a translation of Tolstoy's diaries, on which he had worked with his wife, and to which he appended a lengthy introduction of his own. He also published another "manifesto", "Die Erneuerung" ("The renewal") in the news magazine "Das Forum". That year the war ended. In neutral Switzerland, Ludwig Rubiner's enthusiasm for the Russian Revolution had not impressed the authorities.

There are suggestions that during 1918 the Swiss were coming under increasing pressure from the German General Staff in respect of the Communist activist Frida Rubiner and her anarchist-poet husband. The Russian Revolution alarmed governments across Europe: according to one source a report by the German General Staff concluded that "the circle around the Rubiners in Zürich can be seen as the headquarters of the international revolution" ("Als Zentrale der internationalen Revolution kann erachtet werden der Kreis um Rubiner in Zürich"). The Rubiners were aware of coming under intensified surveillance both by the Swiss authorities and by representatives of the German embassy. They were "spied upon" and their Zürich apartment was searched: it is not clear by whom, nor what the intruders were searching for: they appear not to have found it. Ferruccio Busoni, one of the Rubiner's closest friends during their Swiss exile, wrote a letter to his agent, Albert Biolley, in which he confided that he had himself been "left behind in Zurich" and that his friend Rubiner had left suddenly, without being able to explain why. Either way, the Rubiners became aware that they needed to leave Switzerland. Some sources link this with the expulsion of the Soviet embassy from Bern at about the same time, while others state baldly that in December 1918 they were expelled from the country. On 24 December 1918, thanks to his family's Galician provenance, Ludwig Rubiner was issued with an Austrian passport by Austrian consular authorities who appear still to have been present in Zürich. On 30 January 1919 he left Switzerland and headed for Berlin, travelling via Munich. His wife's involvement in the revolutionary events the took place in Munich during the first half of 1919 vindicate official suspicions at the time that Frida Rubiner, for one, was among those actively working for a soviet style revolution in Germany.

=== Back in Berlin ===
While his wife remained politically engaged in Munich, Ludwig Rubiner returned home to Berlin where he moved into the apartment of his friend, the musician Ferruccio Busoni, who was undertaking a succession of postwar concert tours across Europe's cultural capitals. Rubiner took a job as an editor with the Kiepenhauer publishing house in Potsdam.

He published, for a second time, his anthology "Der Mensch in der Mitte" ("The man [-/person] in the middle"), followed by two further anthologies: "Kameraden der Menschheit: Dichtungen zur Weltrevolution" ("Comrades of humanity: Poems on World Revolution") and "Die Gemeinschaft. Dokumente der geistigen Weltwende" ("Community: Documents of the Global Spiritual Change"). He published the stage-drama that he had written while in Switzerland during 1917 and 1918: "Die Gewaltlosen" ("Men of non-violence"). The stage drama was included in the Kiepenhauer series of new theatrical pieces. This was also the year in which he published his essay "Die kulturelle Stellung des Schauspielers" ("The cultural standing of the stage-actor") in the theatre journal, "Freie Deutsche Bühne".

Early in 1919 Rubiner teamed up with the politically like-minded writers Arthur Holitscher, Rudolf Leonhard, Franz Jung and Alfons Goldschmidt to set up the Bund Proletarischer Kultur ("League for Proletarian Culture"). It sought to promote "the eternal values bequeathed by the illustrious spirits of the past." The league was consciously modelled on the Russian Proletkult movement inspired by Alexander Bogdanov. At least one source states that by this time Rubiner had probably joined the recently launched Communist Party of Germany (KPD). It sought to introduce proletarian culture to support the struggle of the revolutionary masses for liberation from the bourgeois economic and educational monopoly. It operated outside the Communist Party, however and was more aligned with the Communist Workers' Party of Germany. The league also founded a short-lived proletarian theatre, intended to provide proletarian culture for the public. Performances were to take place in factories and other industrial locations. A performance of "Freedom" by Herbert Kranz took place on 14 December 1919. However, the league broke up as a result of "differences of opinion" during 1920 before it had been possible to stage Rubiner's own drama "Die Gewaltlosen" ("Men of non-violence").

Ludwig Rubiner spent the final months of his life working on translating the novels and stories of Voltaire into German. One year earlier he had published in "Die Weißen Blätter" a substantial article on "Voltaire the poet" ("Der Dichter Voltaire") and this was now recycled as a foreword for the first volume of translated works which he published shortly before his death.

=== Death ===
Ludwig Rubiner died after six weeks in a Berlin clinic overnight on 27/28 February 1920 as the result of pneumonia. A few days before he had been presented with an award by "Das junge Deutschland Gesellschaft" ("The Young Germany Society") in celebration of his literary activities.

At his funeral, which took place on 3 March 1920, funeral orations were delivered by Franz Pfemfert and Felix Holländer.
