= Räte-Zeitung =

Leftist magazine in Germany (1919–1920)

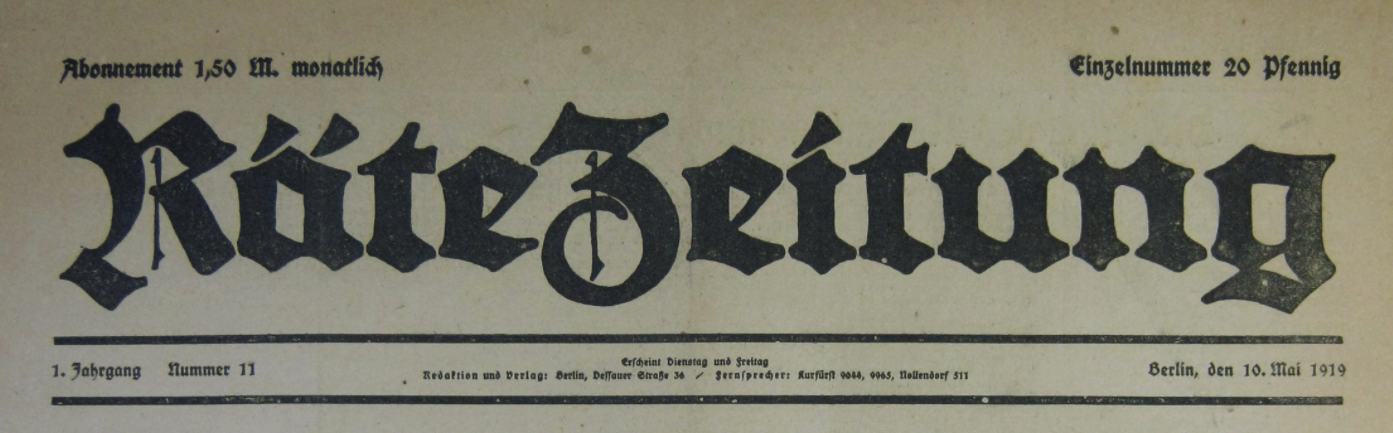
- Editor: Alfons Goldschmidt; Leo Matthias
- Staff writers: Hermann Schüller
- Frequency: Tuesdays and Fridays
- Format: 4 pages
- Founded: 1919
- Final issue: 1920
- Country: Germany
- Based in: Berlin
- Language: German

The Räte-Zeitung (Councils' Newspaper) was a left-wing magazine published from April 1919 until late 1920. It was launched by Philipp Dengel and Alfons Goldschmidt. Leo Matthias joined the editorial team. It proclaimed itself the "Organ of the Workers' Councils". It was one of the main vehicles promoting the activities of German Expressionism – an avant-garde art movement – to the working class.

== Contributors ==
The following were contributors:

- Franz Jung
- Karl Kautsky
- Frederick Wendel
- Karl Radek
- Alexander Bloch
- Kurt Hiller
- Hanns Bruno Herfurth
- Emil Dyrrlich (Berlin-Neuköln)
- Arthur Holitscher
- Ernst Toller
- Otto Gross
