= Richard Oehring =

- Born: Otto Hermann Richard Oehring; 16 June 1891; Düsseldorf, Germany
- Died: 14 May 1940 (aged 48); Netherlands
- Occupations: Economist writer
- Spouse(s): 1. Cläre Otto (1915); 2. Margarethe Kuh (1917)
- Children: Aurora Miriam "Mimi" Oehring (b. 1918)

Richard Oehring (16 June 1891 – 14 May 1940) was a German economist, writer and poet who became a political activist.

== Life ==
Otto Hermann Richard Oehring was born in Düsseldorf. His father was a senior official with the post office. While he was growing up he attended schools successively in Düsseldorf, Hamburg and Berlin. He successfully completed his schooling in 1909 in Berlin. By this time he was a member of the circle of youthful left wing intellectuals surrounding the poet Henriette Hardenberg and her brother Hans. A period of study in Munich followed and Richard Oehring, along with his brother Fritz joined the informal so-called "Tat" ("Deed[s]") group of left-leaning politically aware liberal writers and artists: fellow members included Oskar Maria Graf, Franz Jung and Georg Schrimpf. Following his return to Berlin, Richard Oehring took to contributing as a business and economics journalist to the "Buchwald Börsenberichte" newspaper. From 1912 he was providing pieces for "Die Aktion", a newly launched magazine with its focus on literature and left-wing politics in which he also published some of his poetic and lyrical creations. One of these was his essay "Der Käfig" which appeared in 1913/1914. During 1913/1914 he actively promoted "Die Aktion Authors' Evenings" at the magazine, together with the likes of Gottfried Benn, Paul Boldt, Alfred Lichtenstein and Franz Pfemfert.

His brother Fritz was an early victim of the war which broke out in July 1914. Richard Oehring took part in the war, being stationed in Brussels where he undertook medical work. Falling ill, he returned home to Berlin, but was re-assessed and declared fit for military service. He was reconscripted and deserted, eventually achieving his dismissal by refusing to accept either food or wages. In March 1915 he married Cläre Otto, later described by Fritz Mierau as "the soul and muse of their little [Berlin based artists' and writers'] circle". Starting in 1915 they produced "Die freie Straße" (The Free Street), an Anarchist-Dadaist journal appearing at irregular intervals and of which, by the end of 1917, six editions had been produced. Other members of the production team were Franz Jung, Otto Gross and Georg Schrimpf. A feature of "Die freie Straße" was that the team took turns to take responsibility for production. Richard Oehring was the producer for editions 3 and 4.

Oehring's marriage to Cläre Otto ended in divorce in 1917, and by 1918 she was living with Franz Jung, although it was only in 1924 that the two of them married. The affair put an end to the friendship between Richard Oehring and Franz Jung. Following the divorce Oehring traveled to Vienna to visit Otto Gross. In Vienna he met Margarethe Kuh, a sister of Gross's friend, the writer Anton Kuh: Margarethe became Oehring's second wife. Their daughter, Aurora Miriam "Mimi" Oehring, was born in Berlin in March 1918. Richard Oehring now took work with Alfons Goldschmidt on the Berlin-based "Räte-Zeitung" (newspaper). During the period of acute austerity and turbulence on the streets that followed the end of the First World War Oehring also belonged, with his comrades Ernst Jacobi und Friedrich M. Minck, to the so-called "Co-operative Council for Economic Reconstruction" ("Rätegenossenschaft für wirtschaftlichen Aufbau").

In 1922 Oehring moved to the Soviet Union. By May 1923 he was back in Berlin, possibly on account of his wife's health. That month he wrote in a letter to "Comrade" Oskar Wöhrle, then in Konstanz, describing Margarethe's illness which he believed would be cured by plenty of rest and good food. In Berlin he worked as a trade representative for the Soviet Union, also participating in the film production unit of the Soviet sponsored Workers' International Relief (IAH – Internationale Arbeiter-Hilfe / Международная рабочая помощь) organisation in Berlin. In 1931 he became a member of the "Arplan". Fellow members included Arvid Harnack, Georg Lukács, Friedrich Lenz and Karl August Wittfogel. The commentator Igor Cornelissen believes that Oehring probably accompanied the "Arplan" delegation that travelled to the Soviet Union in 1932, although his name is not included in the official list of delegates.

January 1933 brought régime change to Germany. Richard Oehrling and his family left the country the same year, relocating to the Netherlands where he worked for "Exportchleb", the Soviet trade organisation in the Netherlands, and at the same time undertaking work for the Soviet security services. While in the Netherlands he was in close contact with Ignace Reiss, a Soviet spy who fell foul of Moscow's shifting power structures and was shot by an NKVD assassin in Lausanne a few weeks after sending a letter to Party general secretary Stalin in which he announced his "defection", and support for Trotsky (who by this time had become a high-profile opponent of the Soviet dictator). While in the Netherlands Oehring recruited Johan Huijts, the foreign correspondent of the "Nieuwe Rotterdamsche Courant (NRC)" (newspaper), to work for Soviet intelligence. It is not clear whether Oehring's resignation from "Exportchleb" in 1939 was connected with the killing of Reiss. As an Economics advisor for the NRC, he provided the Rotterdam newspaper with Economics reports from the Soviet Union that were published in its business section. Huijts later recalled that Oehring was much troubled by his failure to obtain Soviet citizenship during the count-down to the Second World War.

In May 1940 the German army invaded the Netherlands and Richard Oehrling responded by committing suicide on 14 May, the day on which the Netherlands formally surrendered. During the German occupation Margarethe Oehrling was arrested and imprisoned, but both she and their daughter survived the war. Margarethe was still alive in 1977.
