= League for Proletarian Culture =

Short-lived German left-wing organisation

The League for Proletarian Culture (German: Bund für proletarische Kultur) was a short-lived German left-wing organisation for the promotion of proletarian culture. It was founded in Berlin in spring 1919 by Alfons Goldschmidt, Arthur Holitscher, and Ludwig Rubiner and was dissolved in early 1920. It sought to promote "the eternal values bequeathed by the illustrious spirits of the past."

They published Aufruf zu einem Bund für proletarische Kultur (Call for a League for Proletarian Culture) which referred to Alexander Bogdanov and the Proletkult movement he had established as a mass movement in Russia. They set out to "lay the foundations for a new proletarian culture" to which end they subsequently published their Grundsätze und Programm. Here they claimed they sought to wipe out the last traces of bourgeois culture from working class consciousness, seeing the disappearance of this pseudo-culture as no loss. They envisaged a new proletarian culture dormant within the working class which could be woken up and play a role in the revolutionary transformation of society.

== Proletarian Theatre ==
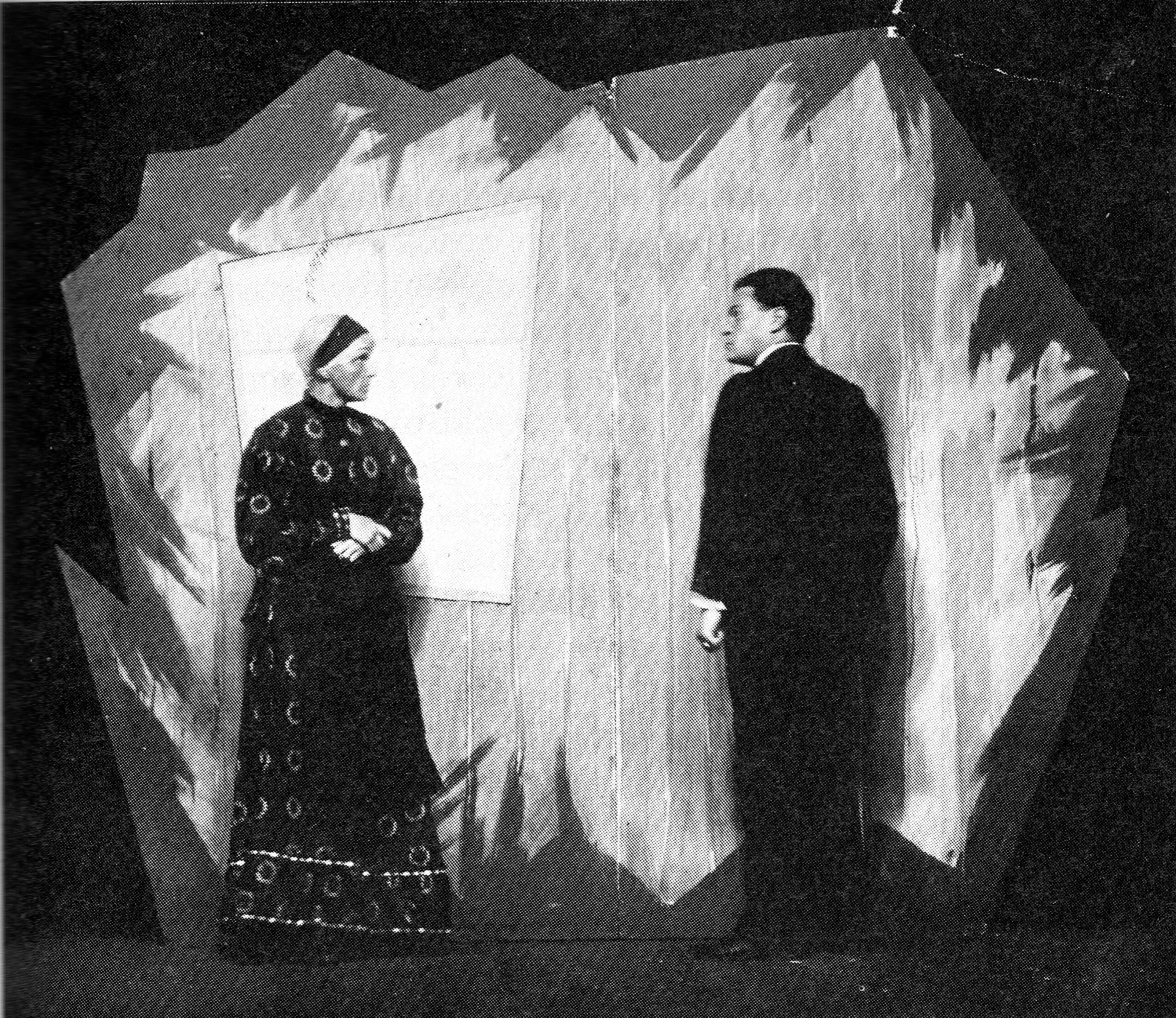
Fritz Kortner in Toller's Transformation, 30 September 1919

Under the auspices of the experimental theatre, the Tribüne (founded in September 1919), the league staged Ernst Toller's Transformation (Die Wandlung), which opened on 30 September 1919 with a cast that included Fritz Kortner. The production ran into difficulties in mid-October, however, when some of its cast refused to play for metalworkers who were on strike at the time, which led to the termination of the relationship between the League and the Tribüne. The director Karlheinz Martin and dramaturg Rudolf Leonhard, both of whom had worked on the Toller production, formed the "Proletarian Theatre of the League for Proletarian Culture" (Proletarisches Theater des Bundes für proletarische Kultur). It produced Herbert Kranz's Freiheit (Freedom), which opened on 14 December 1919 on the platform of the Old Philharmonie Berlin. Despite the production's success, having filled the auditorium, only one performance was given. The newspaper of the Communist Party of Germany (KPD), Die Rote Fahne (The Red Flag) thought that in its promotion of individual self-realisation through self-sacrifice the play adopted an anarchist political position. However this took place following the departure of the left wing of the KPD, firstly into the KPD(Opposition), before forming their own party, the KAPD.

== Political alignment ==
Whilst the KPD did little in the field of the arts, the KAPD stated in their programme: "a decisive factor in hastening the social revolution is revolutionising the proletariat's entire mental view of the world. With this in mind, the party supports all revolutionary tendencies in science and in the arts".

== Members ==
- Johannes R. Becher
- Alfons Goldschmidt
- Arthur Holitscher
- Franz Jung
- Rudolf Leonhard
- Karlheinz Martin
- Ludwig Rubiner
- Hermann Schüller

== Sources ==
- Pearlman, Alan Raphael, ed. and trans. 2000. Plays One: Transformation, Masses Man, Hoppla, We're Alive!. By Ernst Toller. Absolute Classics ser. London: Oberon. ISBN 1-84002-195-0.
- Piscator, Erwin. 1980. The Political Theatre. Trans. Hugh Rorrison. London: Methuen. ISBN 0-413-33500-3. Originally published in 1929; revised edition 1963.
- Rorrison, Hugh. 1980. Editorial notes. In Piscator (1980).
- Sheppard, Richard. 2000. Modernism-Dada-Postmodernism. Avant-Garde & Modernism Studies ser. Evanston, Ill: Northwestern UP. ISBN 0-8101-1493-3.
- Stourac, Richard, and Kathleen McCreery. 1986. Theatre as a Weapon: Workers' Theatre in the Soviet Union, Germany and Britain, 1917-1934. London and New York: Routledge. ISBN 0-7100-9770-0.
- Willett, John. 1978a. The Theatre of Erwin Piscator: Half a Century of Politics in the Theatre. London: Methuen. ISBN 0-413-37810-1.
- ---. 1978b. Art and Politics in the Weimar Period: The New Sobriety 1917-1933. New York: Da Capo Press, 1996. ISBN 0-306-80724-6.
