= German League for Human Rights =

The German League for Human Rights (German: Deutsche Liga für Menschenrechte) was founded on 16 November 1914 as the pacifist group Bund Neues Vaterland (New Fatherland League) by pacifist activist Lilli Jannasch and others.

Among its members: Albert Einstein, Carl von Ossietzky, Kurt Tucholsky, Friedrich Simon Archenhold, Walther Borgius, Elsbeth Bruck, Minna Cauer, Hans Delbrück, Kurt Eisner, Friedrich Wilhelm Foerster, Alfred Hermann Fried, Alexander Futran, Hellmut von Gerlach, Georg Arnhold, Rudolf Goldscheid, Emil J. Gumbel, Paul Guttfeld, Arthur Holitscher, Harry Graf Kessler, Gustav Landauer, Otto Lehmann-Rußbüldt, Ernst Meyer, Georg Friedrich Nicolai, Paul Oestreich, Hans Paasche, Ludwig Quidde, Heinrich Rausch von Traubenberg, Ernst Reuter, Helene Stöcker, Leopold von Wiese, Clara Zetkin, and Stefan Zweig. Based in Germany is also the 'International League for Human Rights' or Internationale Liga für Menschenrechte (ILMR), associated with the European League for Human Rights (Association Européenne pour la défense des Droits de l'Homme) AEDH and the FIDH.
