= Die Weißen Blätter =

German literary magazine

Die Weißen Blätter ("The White Pages") was a German monthly magazine, which was one of the most important journals of literary expressionism during its publication period 1913 to 1920. The full title was Die Weißen Blätter. Eine Monatsschrift ("The White Pages: A Monthly Magazine").

== History ==
Die Weißen Blätter were published from 1913 to 1915 by Erik Ernst-Schwabach in Leipzig in the Verlag der weißen Bücher. In 1915 René Schickele took over. From 1916 to 1917 they were printed by the Verlag Rascher in Zurich, in 1918 in the Verlag der Weißen Blätter in Bern, from 1919 to 1920 Paul Cassirer published the magazine in Berlin.

At the beginning of 1937, Schickele temporarily planned to revive the magazine.

== Writers ==
Writers of Die Weißen Blätter have included Henri Barbusse, Gottfried Benn, Eduard Bernstein, Franz Blei, Max Brod, Martin Buber, Theodor Däubler, Albert Ehrenstein, Carl Einstein, Friedrich Wilhelm Foerster, Leonhard Frank, George Grosz, Wilhelm Hausenstein, Hermann Hesse, Kurt Hiller, Annette Kolb, Paul Kornfeld, Else Lasker-Schüler, Rudolf Leonhard, Mechtilde Lichnowsky, Heinrich Mann, Gustav Meyrink, Robert Musil, Max Scheler, Ernst Stadler, Carl Sternheim, André Suarès, Theodor Tagger, Robert Walser, Ernst Weiß, Felix Weltsch, and Franz Werfel.

The magazine published as first prints Meyrink's novel Der Golem in 1913/14 and in October 1915 Kafka's story "Die Verwandlung" (The Metamorphosis).

== Literature ==
- Sven Arnold: Das Spektrum des literarischen Expressionismus in den Zeitschriften „Der Sturm“ und „Die Weissen Blätter“. Peter Lang, Frankfurt am Main 1998, ISBN 3-631-33549-0.
