= Alexander Schwab =

German Left Communist activist (1887–1943)

Alexander Schawb
- Born: 5 July 1887; Stuttgart, Württemberg, Germany
- Died: 12 November 1943 (aged 56); Zwickau Jail, Gau Saxony, Germany
- Occupations: politician teacher journalist anti-Nazi activist
- Political party: USPD; KPD; KAPD
- Spouse: Hildegard Felisch (1889–1934)
- Children: Franziska Schwab/Violet (1916–96); Hans Schwab-Felisch (1918–89)
- Parent(s): Karl Julius Schwab(1855–1907); Helene Lindner

Alexander Schwab (5 July 1887 – 12 November 1943) was a German political activist. He withdrew from active participation in politics after resigning from the fractious and short-lived Communist Workers' Party ("Kommunistische Arbeiter-Partei Deutschlands" / KAPD) in 1922, but continued his contribution as an independent left of centre commentator-journalist. During the twelve Nazi years he was arrested at least twice, spending the final years of his life, between 1936 and 1943, in a succession of jails. Sources may also identify him by the pseudonym under which some of his contributions were published, as Albert Sigrist Sachs.

== Life ==
=== Provenance and early years ===
Alexander Schwab was born into a Protestant family in Stuttgart. He grew up in Danzig where his father Karl Julius Schwab, a musician and composer, was in charge of the music ("als Opernkappelmeister") at the city opera house. He attended a Gymnasium (secondary school) in Danzig and then moved on to study Philosophy, Germanistics, Classical languages, Applied Economics ("Nationalökonomie"), Sociology and Civil law at Rostock, Jena, Heidelberg and Freiburg i.B. At university he participated actively in the Freestudenthood, a grouping of students who were expressly not members of the more traditional student fraternities. He was also a member of the politically left-of-centre Wandervogel hiking movement. Alexander Schwab received his doctorate from Heidelberg University in 1913. His doctoral dissertation was entitled "The influence of consumption on the German furniture industry and production" ("Der Einfluß der Konsumtion auf Möbelindustrie und Möbelproduktion in Deutschland"), but when it was published two years later it was under the shorter title "Möbelkonsumtion und Möbelproduktion in Deutschland".

=== Young intellectual ===
For a year following the award of his doctorate, during 1913/14, Schwab taught at the Wickersdorf Free School Community, a progressive school that had been founded by the controversial education pioneer Gustav Wyneken in the countryside south of Erfurt in 1906. Several historians describe Schwab during this period as one of the leading intellects of the influential Free German Youth movement. In October 1913 he participated in the first ever Free German Youth Day in the Hoher Meißner hills north of Frankfurt. In the months before the war he also involved himself in conceptualising and organising democratically elected "General Student Committees" ("Allgemeiner Studenten-Ausschüsse").

Around this time Schwab and some of his intellectual friends rented a large house in Jena and embarked on what was seen at the time as a remarkable experiment in cohabitation, whereby four unmarried young men and four unmarried young women all lived together in the one house. On 8 May 1914 the unmarried status of two members of the cohabiting community ended when Alexander Schwab married Dr Hildegard Felisch: it was her twenty-fifth birthday.

=== War and ... political idealism ===
At the end of July 1914 war broke out. Alexander Schwab lost little time in volunteering for the army. He was very quickly rejected for military service, however, on account of a pulmonary hemorrhage ("Lungen-Blutsturz"). He was instead sent to a desk job in the war supplies department. Later he found himself working in Dresden at the "Jasmatzi" cigarette factory.

Despite having volunteered for military service in 1914, by 1918 Alexander Schwab had joined the anti-war movement. He became friendly with the radical socialist educationalist Otto Rühle (1874–1943) and with the young artist Conrad Felixmüller. In 1917 Schwab joined the Independent Social Democratic Party ("Unabhängige Sozialdemokratische Partei Deutschlands" / USPD) which had broken away from the mainstream Social Democratic Party ("Sozialdemokratische Partei Deutschlands" / SPD) following an intensification of internal party ructions over funding for the war. The next year he joined the Spartacus League: he was numbered among the close friends of the movement's best-known founders, Karl Liebknecht and Rosa Luxemburg.

=== Communist Workers' Party of Germany ===
At the end of the year the Communist Party of Germany emerged from the USPD, founded formally at a three-day conference in Berlin between 30 December 1918 and 1 January 1919. Schwab found himself on the left wing of the Communist Party, collaborating closely with Karl Schröder (1884–1950). Beyond the world of party politics, directly following the revolutions of 1918/19, he teamed up with the teacher Frieda Winckelmann (1873–1943) and others to set up a "Free academy community for proletarians" ("Freie Hochschulgemeinde für Proletarier") from which emerged, in the first part of 1919, the "Soviet school of the Greater Berlin labour movement" ("Räteschule der Groß-Berliner Arbeiterschaft"). Barely two years later the institution became insolvent and was taken over by the trades unions.

The parties of the left were prone to fragment during this period, and in 1920 Alexander Schwab and his friend Karl Schröder were founder members of the Communist Workers' Party ("Kommunistische Arbeiter-Partei Deutschlands" / KAPD), becoming a leading ideological strategist of its Berlin group. In June/July 1921 he led the KAPD delegation to the third world congress of the Communist International (Comintern), held in Moscow. He was sharply critical of Comrade Lenin's political tactics in respect of western Europe: the speeches he contributed were published in the congress minutes, using the cover name "Sachs" to identify him.

=== Progressive journalist ===
After the Moscow congress there was a cooling in relations between Schwab's wing of the KAPD and the Comintern headquarters, based in Moscow. Back in Germany his friend and political ally Karl Schröder was removed from his position as head of a major group within the KAPD in 1922. This was part of a more general reconfiguration of the party, and Alexander Schwab himself left the party later that year. The party's two principal strands staggered on, increasingly divided between themselves, for a few more years, but Schwab now removed himself from direct engagement with party politics. He supported himself as a freelance journalist and author specialising in economics, and increasingly also in architecture. Some of his output appeared under the pseudonym "Albert Sigrist". Publications in which his contributions appeared most frequently included the Berliner Tageblatt, the Berliner Börsen-Zeitung and Das Neue Berlin (newspapers). From 1927 he was also writing on architecture for "Die Form", the journal of the Deutscher Werkbund (loosely: "German Craft Association"). According to one commentator these contributions marked him out as "one of the most clear sighted writers on architecture of his time".

From 1928 Schwab was also involved with the "Social Sciences Association" ("Sozialwissenschaftliche Vereinigung" / SWV), according to at least one source as one if its founders. His contributions at its meetings became progressively more frequent over the next few years. Several of his more prominent friends and contacts at this time were architects, on what would generally have been seen as the progressive wing of the profession. He teamed up with several, including Hugo Häring, Ludwig Hilberseimer, Ludwig Mies van der Rohe and Martin Mächler to produce "Das Buch vom Bauen", a book which appeared in 1930 under the pseudonym "Albert Sigrist". (Subsequent reprints have been published acknowledging Alexander Schwab's authorship on the cover.)

Between 1928/29 and 1933 Alexander Schwab was employed as chief press spokesman for the National Institution for Unemployment Insurance ("Reichsanstalt für Arbeitslosenversicherung"). The position was one in which it became his duty to be confronted every day with the country's social, political and economic difficulties.

=== Régime change: dismissal and arrest ===
The Nazis took power in January 1933 and lost very little time in transforming Germany into a one-party dictatorship. Schwab was dismissed from his job as a press spokesman under the provisions of the Law for the Restoration of the Professional Civil Service ("Gesetz zur Wiederherstellung des Berufsbeamtentums") enacted in April 1933. The law is frequently cited as an antisemitic device, which it was, but it was also directed at eliminating political opposition from the public services, and Schwab's very public political record would have been repugnant to the Nazis. That same month he was taken into "protective custody" by the Gestapo on account of suspected anti-state activities ("wegen des Verdachts staatsfeindlicher Umtriebe"). Sources vary as to the duration of this initial period of detention, which seems to have last for approximately two or six months. One source indicates that his (relatively) early release resulted from the personal intervention of his father-in-law, Dr. Paul Felisch, with Magnus von Levetzow, the Berlin police commissioner. As a former senior naval official (Admiralitätsrat), Paul Felisch was at this stage still not without influence within establishment circles.

Even before 1933 Schwab had teamed up with old comrades from their KAPD days to form the secretive Rote Kämpfer ("Red fighters") operation, an apparently broadly based association drawing members from various groups on the political left, intended to prepare for "underground opposition" in the event of a Nazi take-over. By its nature, details of the organisation are in short supply, but others involved in setting it up included Karl Schröder, Arthur Goldstein and Bernhard Reichenbach.

Schwab had been seriously considering emigration to Mexico. However, shortly after his release his wife Hildegard died, which some sources implicitly connect with his new determination to stay in Germany and engage in (illegal) political activity in opposition to the government. He joined with Franz Jung to launch "Wirtschaftskorrespondenz", a press agency with its focus on business news. It evidently filled a genuine niche in the market for this type of service, at one stage supplying regular economic news items to more than fifty newspapers, including Völkischer Beobachter, the mass circulation daily newspaper of the ruling Nazi Party. The agency provided him with an income. In the words of one source, Schwab and Jung also "used [the agency] as a cover for [unspecified] underground political activity".

=== Arrest, interrogation and trial ===
It is not entirely clear when Alexander Schwab took over the national leadership of the shadowy Rote Kämpfer ("Red fighters"). On at least one occasion, early in 1936 he crossed the border to Prague in order to arrange the production of a Rote Kämpfer news sheet. While in Prague he received warnings not to return to Germany. He nevertheless returned to Berlin and, if he had not done so already, became the Rote Kämpfer national leader. In the context of a wider round-up of the organisation's leadership, Alexander Schwab's office was surrounded by Nazi paramilitaries on 17 November 1936 and he was arrested.

In the interrogations that followed he was badly tortured. At the session that took place on 21 November 1936 he was keen to take full responsibility for the Rote Kämpfer on his own shoulders. He was, in particularly, determined to minimise the culpability attaching to Karl Schröder, Franz Jung and, in particular, the younger members of the leadership team. It is one mark of his success that both Schröder and Jung survived long enough to outlive the Nazi régime. Jung, indeed, was released almost at once, and able to escape, via Prague, to Budapest.

After about a year of "investigative detention", six members of the Rote Kämpfer leadership, identified in the record as "Schwab and comrades" ("Schwab und Genossen"), faced trial before the "second senate" of the special "People's Court" in Berlin on 28, 29 and 30 October 1937. One of the defendants, Karl Schröder, later shared some memories of the trial. The three judges did not appear to have backgrounds in the justice system. The third of them was a teacher who attempted to calculate a sentence for one of the defendants. He appeared unaware of the requirement to take account of pre-trial detention already served, but then wanted to reduce the sentence because the man to be sentenced had done some teaching, which sounded to him like a mitigating factor. When it was Schröder's own turn to testify he found himself talking about a public meeting at which he had talked about "generational issues" ("Generationsfrage "). His testimony had to be paused while a colleague explained to the leading judge, "he means, sort of, between young and old" ("Er meint, so zwischen jung und alt."). The three judges were evidently unable to get their heads around the fact that despite the defendants obviously being communists, they were also self evidently fervently anti-Bolshevik. According to Schröder's not necessarily completely unbiased memories, he himself had so impressed the court that they came close to releasing him without further ado on the grounds that he was evidently "not entirely of sound mind" ("nicht ganz zurechnungsfähig"). In the end Schröder received a four-year prison term. His health was ruined, but he nevertheless lived on till 1950. Of the six men facing the court it was Alexander Schwab who received the longest sentence, which seems to have reflected his continuing determination to absorb, as far as possible, the culpability that might otherwise attach to comrades. The court sentenced him to an eight-year jail term, being particularly concerned that "he had been writing for German newspapers while simultaneously working against the German state". Alexander Schwab was the only one of the six who would not survive his prison term.

=== Prison and death ===
During the ensuing years Schwab was held in prisons at Brandenburg, Zwickau and Sinnenburg. He also spend time in the Concentration Camp at Börgermoor. At times he was subjected to severe physical abuses. It was at Zwickau that he died. The circumstances and cause of his death were never entirely clear. The prison authorities reported that he died of pneumonia.
