= Senator Schröder =

Senator Schröder may refer to:

- Christian Matthias Schröder (1742–1821), patriarch of the Schröder family
- Christian Mathias Schröder (1778–1860), son of the above
- Walther Schröder (1902–1973)
- Senator Schröder (ship), a German trawler

== See also ==
- Schröder (surname)
