= Philipp Dengel =

German Communist politician and journalist

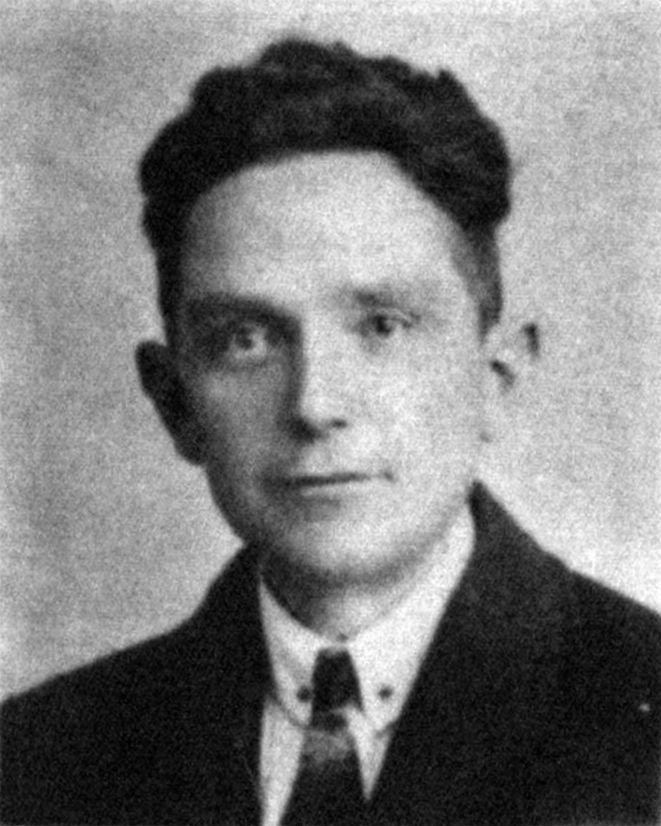
- Flieg c. 1924

Member of the Reichstag for Düsseldorf East
- In office 27 May 1924 – 14 September 1930
- Preceded by: Multi-member district
- Succeeded by: Multi-member district

Personal details
- Born: 15 December 1888 Ober-Ingelheim, Grand Duchy of Hesse, German Empire
- Died: 28 March 1948 (aged 59) Berlin, Soviet Occupation Zone
- Party: SPD (1911–1919); KPD (1919–1920, after 1921); KAPD (1920–1921)
- Education: University of Mainz; University of Giessen
- Occupation: Politician; Journalist; Teacher

Military service
- Allegiance: German Empire
- Branch/service: Imperial German Army
- Years of service: 1913–1918
- Rank: Leutnant
- Battles/wars: World War I
- Central institution membership: 1925–1929: Full member, KPD Politburo; 1925–1935, 1939–1945: Full member, KPD Central Committee; Other offices held: 1924–1925: Political Leader, Lower Rhine KPD; 1924: Political Leader, Wasserkante (Hamburg-Schleswig-Holstein) KPD

Philipp Dengel (15 December 1888 – 28 March 1948) was a German communist journalist and politician. Dengel was a member of the Reichstag for the Communist Party of Germany (KPD) between 1924 and 1930, a member of the KPD Central Committee and Politburo, and an editor of Die Rote Fahne. Dengel was a close ally of KPD leader Ernst Thälmann until they fell out over the so-called Wittorf affair in 1928, for which he was demoted within the KPD and removed as a candidate for the 1930 federal election. Dengel lived principally in Moscow and worked as an official for Comintern between 1931 and 1947. Dengel returned to Germany shortly before his death in East Berlin in 1948.

== Early years ==
Philipp Dengel was born on 15 December 1888 in Ober-Ingelheim, a village west of Mainz in the Grand Duchy of Hesse. His father, also named Philipp Dengel, was a producer and distiller in the German wine industry. He attended school, initially in the village, and then at the Realgymnasium in Mainz between 1903 and 1907. He studied Philosophy and History at the University of Mainz and the University of Giessen. (Note: Sources stating that Dengel studied at the University of Heidelberg are believed to be in error.) He worked as a teacher at a private school in Heidelberg until 1913, when he called up for conscripted into the Imperial Germany Army. Dengel was still serving in the army when World War I broke out the next year, and remained so until the war ended in 1918, when he discharged as a leutnant in the military reserve.

== Political career ==
Dengel had joined the Social Democratic Party of Germany (SPD) in 1911, but like hundreds of thousands of others he was radicalised by the war. He actively participated in the German Revolution in November 1918, joining Kurt Eisner in People's State of Bavaria, and turning up in Berlin shortly afterwards as legation secretary from the short-lived communist government in Bavaria. In March 1919, Dengel switched from the SPD to the recently formed Communist Party of Germany (KPD). He teamed up with Alfons Goldschmidt to help launch the Räte-Zeitung, a four-page newspaper of the revolutionary "Workers' council" movement. He was a contributing editor to Die Republik, a daily newspaper directed by the polymath and pacifist Wilhelm Herzog. In Berlin during early 1920, Dengel participated in defeating the Kapp Putsch and briefly became a member of the extremist breakaway Communist Workers' Party. Between September and December 1920, he visited Moscow in the Soviet Union. According to at least one source, it was only after a visit and a meeting with Vladimir Lenin in early 1921 he returned to the mainstream KPD.

In May 1921, Dengel joined Die Rote Fahne newspaper, which by this time had become a KPD publication, as foreign policy editor. The next year, he was switched to work as a senior journalist with newspapers backing the party in Germany's principal industrial regions further to the west. In 1922, he took over as editor-in-chief at Sozialistische Republik, the Communist daily newspaper produced in Cologne. By 1923, he had moved again to Hamburg, and was looking after the Hamburger Volkszeitung. In October, he took part in the Hamburg Uprising in the city, taking on key organisational responsibilities for munitions and food supplies. At the start of 1924, Dengel took a party appointment as Polleiter (loosely "policy leader") with the regional KPD leadership team ("Bezirksleitung") for the Wasserkante region surrounding Hamburg. Later that year, he moved to the Lower Rhine region, appointed regional Polleiter in August 1924, by now using for party purposes the pseudonym "Schmidt". He held that position until October 1925.

=== Reichstag member ===
In the first 1924 federal election, Dengel was elected as one of 62 KPD MPs of the Reichstag. It was the first time the KPD, now with more than 10% of the national vote, achieved a significant presence in the assembly. In July 1925, at the KPD's tenth party congress held in Berlin, Dengel was elected to the Central Committee, remaining a member through a decade of mixed political fortunes till 1935. 1925 was a year of intensified factionalism within the Communist Party. The German executive commission of the Moscow-based Comintern, presumably taking their lead from Soviet leader Joseph Stalin, became disenchanted with the leadership of Arkadi Maslow and Ruth Fischer after the second 1924 federal election seven months later, which saw the party's vote share drop back below 10%. Some commentators saw this development as a result of an improvement in the German economy, but for Stalin and the KPD left-wingers it was a sign that their party was becoming insufficiently differentiated from the political mainstream. As the party became more divided, an "open letter" was drawn up between 12 and 14 August and sent to the KPD by the Comintern's German executive commission, drawing attention to the growing resurgence of Imperial-era nostalgia on the extreme right of German politics, and providing a careful Soviet-Marxist analysis and prescription. Capitalist stabilization imperilled the class struggle on which future political success for Soviet style communism in Germany depended. The "open letter" was later published in Die Rote Fahne on 22 December 1928. A triumvirate comprising Dengel, Ernst Thälmann, and John Schehr led support for the "open letter" during the run-up to a Central Committee meeting which took place between 28 August and 1 September 1925. Maslow and Fischer retained their Politburo memberships for the next few weeks, but under Thälmann's leadership the existing Politburo itself was sidelined by the alternative team, which proved adept at capturing the support of other influential comrades. In October 1925, Thälmann emerged as party leader with Dengel as his close political ally, becoming a Politburo member, and serving as secretary to the Party Central Committee and co-chairmen (with Thälmann) of the party between 1925 and 1929.

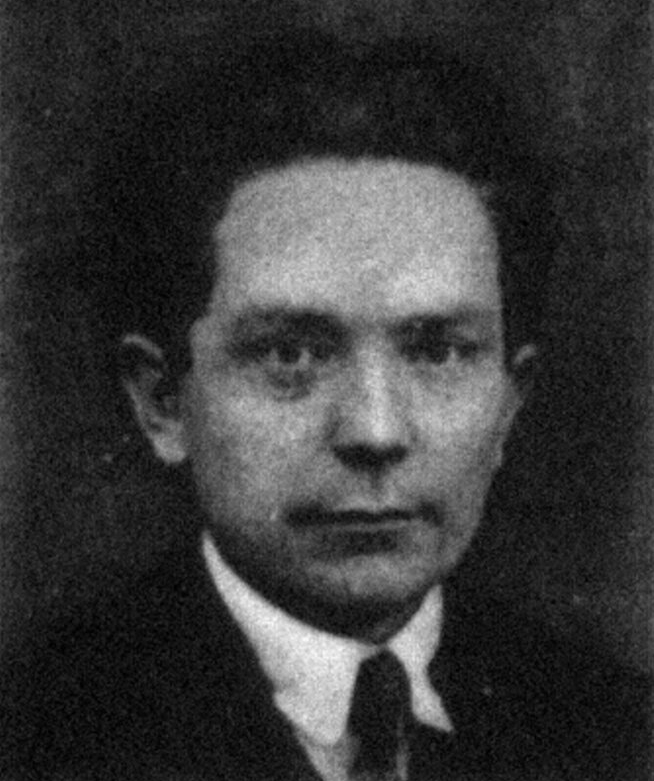
Dengel's official Reichstag portrait, 1928

In the late summer of 1928, at the sixth Comintern World Congress which took place in Moscow, Dengel was elected a member of the organisation's executive committee and of its praesidium. The congress also saw powerful endorsement by Thälmann of Stalin's uncompromising and fateful rejection of any kind of collaboration with the SPD. Dengel would remain a member of the Comintern praesidium, at least formally, until June 1941.

In October 1928, the Wittorf affair, a major embezzlement scandal within the KPD, seriously undermined the powerful alliance at the top of the party between Thälmann and Dengel. Thälmann's attempt to cover up the embezzlement led to him being expelled from the Central Committee by horrified comrades. Dengel suggested that Thälmann should give up the party leadership "for a period," which led to an immediate distancing between the two. (Note: "Genosse Thälmann muß verschwinden von der oberen Spitze der Partei für eine gewisse Zeit.") It did not lead to Thälmann surrendering the party leadership, however, and Dengel found that in falling out with him he had also fallen out with Stalin and the Stalinists within the KPD. After Thälmann had been restored to his membership of the Central Committee, Dengel received a reprimand and faced the loss of his position as secretary of the Central Committee.

=== Demotion ===
The KPD's twelfth party congress was held in the Wedding district of Berlin (a KPD stronghold) in June 1929. Dengel was re-elected to the Central Committee, but he was no longer included in the Politburo, and he was stripped of other party functions. Back in his Ingelheim home base, reports surfaced that he had been expelled from the national party leadership due to conflicts with Thälmann. These were vehemently denied by local party officials, who were able to cite his continued membership of the Central Committee in support of their denials. With more time for journalism, he served as an editor of Die Rote Fahne from 1930 to 1931. (Note: Some sources describe Dengel's position at Die Rote Fahne during 1930/31 as that of "editor in chief" ("Chefredakteur" / "rédacteur en chef"). From other sources it appears unlikely that the newspaper would have employed anyone as an "editor in chief", at least in the sense commonly understood. It seems more likely that he worked as a contributing editor - possibly an exceptionally productive one.) He succeeded Heinrich Süßkind whose fall from grace, in the eyes of Stalin and Thälmann, was evidently more absolute than his own. There are also references to Dengel having taught during this period at the "Rosa Luxemburg party academy" in Ficthenau on the eastern edge of Berlin.

For the 1930 federal election, Dengel was no longer included on the KPD candidate list, ending his career in the Reichstag. Nevertheless, he campaigned actively for KPD, advocating the Stalinist party line for unity with the SPD in order to block the Nazi Party. On 10 September 1930, he appeared at an election meeting in Ingelheim and addressed more than 300 people who "listened attentively to his remarks" even if they did not all agree with everything he said. In his speech, he savagely attacked the SPD, which he characterised as the complete opposite of a "true workers' party".

=== Comintern ===
Towards the end of 1931, the KPD sent Dengel to Moscow to work for the Comintern, where his work appears to have involved a good deal of international travel, while his wife and family seem to have remained in Germany. According to at least one source, he spent almost a year in the Second Spanish Republic during the First Biennium from 1931 to 1932, followed by several weeks in Latin America. By the end of 1932, he was back in Moscow. From December 1933 to August 1935, he headed the Comintern regional secretariat for Scandinavia, which involved a number of trips to Denmark, Norway and Sweden.

In January 1933, the Nazis took power in Germany and quickly transformed the country into a one-party state Enabling Act of 1933. The Reichstag fire occurred in Berlin overnight on 27/28 February 1933, and was blamed by the government with implausible haste on "communists". It quickly became apparent – to the extent that it had not already been – that those with communist connections were in particular danger from the Gestapo, the Nazi secret police. Dengel's wife Katharina now joined him in Moscow where the family were from now on to be based, though he would continue to travel extensively in connection with his Comintern work.

In July/August, Dengel attended the Seventh World Congress of the Comintern, identifying himself by the party pseudonym "Ulmer". In October 1935, the exiled KPD held its thirteenth party congress. In order to try and reduce the dangers to the comrades involved, this congress was always referred to in communications as the "Brussels congress" though it actually took place in the town of Kuntsevo near Moscow. Dengel was in attendance. He left both the Comintern congress and the "Brussels congress" armed with clear detailed instructions from the party to its members and activists concerning the project, for which he had personally already been pressing, involving the creation of a broadly based anti-Nazi German "popular front" movement. A new KPD Central Committee was elected comprising just fifteen members, in contrast to the previous committee elected in 1929 which had consisted of 38 member. With the benefit of hindsight, it becomes clear that the new slimmed down Central Committee was made up of supporters of Walter Ulbricht. Dengel, despite being based in Moscow at the time and having already been a Central Committee member for ten years, was now excluded from it.

Between November 1935 and April 1936, Dengel undertook a lengthy visit to Paris where he worked with the so-called "Lutetia Circle" attempting to create a "popular front" against the Nazis. Most of the exiled KPD leaders had ended up in Paris, Moscow, or Prague. The KPD, along with their Soviet backers, took the lead in the Lutetia project while insisting that membership should be broadly based as was open to all who opposed Nazism in Germany. At least one preparatory meeting was convened at the Hôtel Lutetia in February and/or March 1936. Dengel presented a policy paper that had been helpfully drawn up by exiled members of the KPD Politburo in Moscow. Nevertheless, many on the political left still blamed the KPD for splitting the political left during the early 1930s, thereby opening the way for the Nazis to take power. Somehow, the energy the exiled communists devoted to the Lutetia Circle, served only to dampen the enthusiasm from other parts of the anti-Nazi political spectrum. The meeting at which Dengel gave his presentation left fellow delegates convinced that he was present simply as a "trusted representative" of the party leaders in Moscow, and in April 1936 he was recalled. Attempts were made to revive the Lutetia Circle later in 1936, with the KPD leadership represented by Franz Dahlem and Ulbricht. The most visible outcome was the so-called "Appeal to the German people", signed by more than 70 German political exiles, including Dengel among them, issued at the end of December 1936. It called for the overthrow of the Nazi government and included the plea, "Create the German popular front! For peace, liberty and bread!". (Note: "Bildet die deutsche Volksfront! Für Frieden, Freiheit und Brot!")

=== Later years and death ===
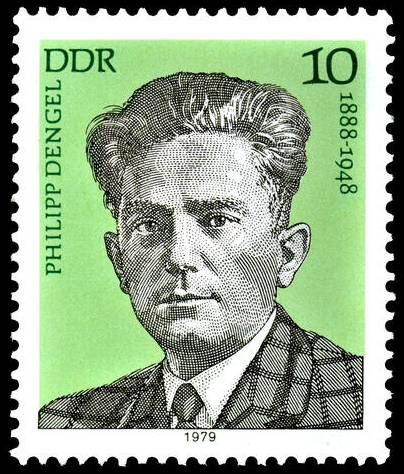
1979 East German stamp depicting Dengel

In 1936, Dengel was recalled to party work, sent to Prague between April and September to facilitate and secure the production of the German-language Deutsche Volkszeitung newspaper being produced in the city at that time. After returning to Moscow at the end of the year, he started work at the Comintern's International Lenin School as a teacher-instructor. On 8 March 1938, the Nazis had deprived Dengel and his family of their German citizenship rights. At the "Bern congress" which actually took place in Draveil, on the edge of Paris, a unanimous decision was taken to enlarge the Central Committee, and Dengel was re-elected to it. Whether on account of travel difficulties or on account of his deteriorating health, he was, along with at least three party member who were probably also based in Moscow at the time and had not made the journey to France, elected in his absence. The conference itself had an unforeseen and disappointing epilogue: a few months after the KPD exiled leaders had passed resolutions committing to victory over fascism, they learned of the Molotov–Ribbentrop Pact between Nazi Germany and the Soviet Union. In September 1939, both countries invaded and occupied Poland from opposite directions. In Moscow, it was necessary to undergo a rapid change of heart when it came to "a united front against fascism" which was now contrary to its interests. There are reports that as early as 1929, Dengel was forced by serious illness to cut short a Comintern mission overseas. There is no indication that he became more actively involved in party work after his return to the Central Committee ten years later.

On 22 June 1941, Nazi Germany launched its invasion of the Soviet Union which, that same day, Dengel suffered a serious stroke from which he would never properly recover. In 1944, he was listed as a member of the Soviet sponsored National Committee for a Free Germany, but he was no longer playing any active political role. It was as an invalid that he returned with his wife to East Berlin in the Soviet Occupation Zone in September 1947, where he died there six months later.
