= Jannasch =

Jannasch is a German surname. Notable people with this surname include the following:

- Holger W. Jannasch (1927-1998), German microbiologist for whom the genus Jannaschia was named
- Lilli Jannasch (1872–1968), German feminist, pacifist, journalist and graphologist
- Marie Jannasch (1824–1877), German nurse
- Niels Jannasch (1924–2001), German-Canadian mariner and marine historian
- Wilhelm Jannasch (1888–1966), German Protestant theologian and clergyman
