= Lilli Jannasch =

German feminist, journalist (1872–1968)

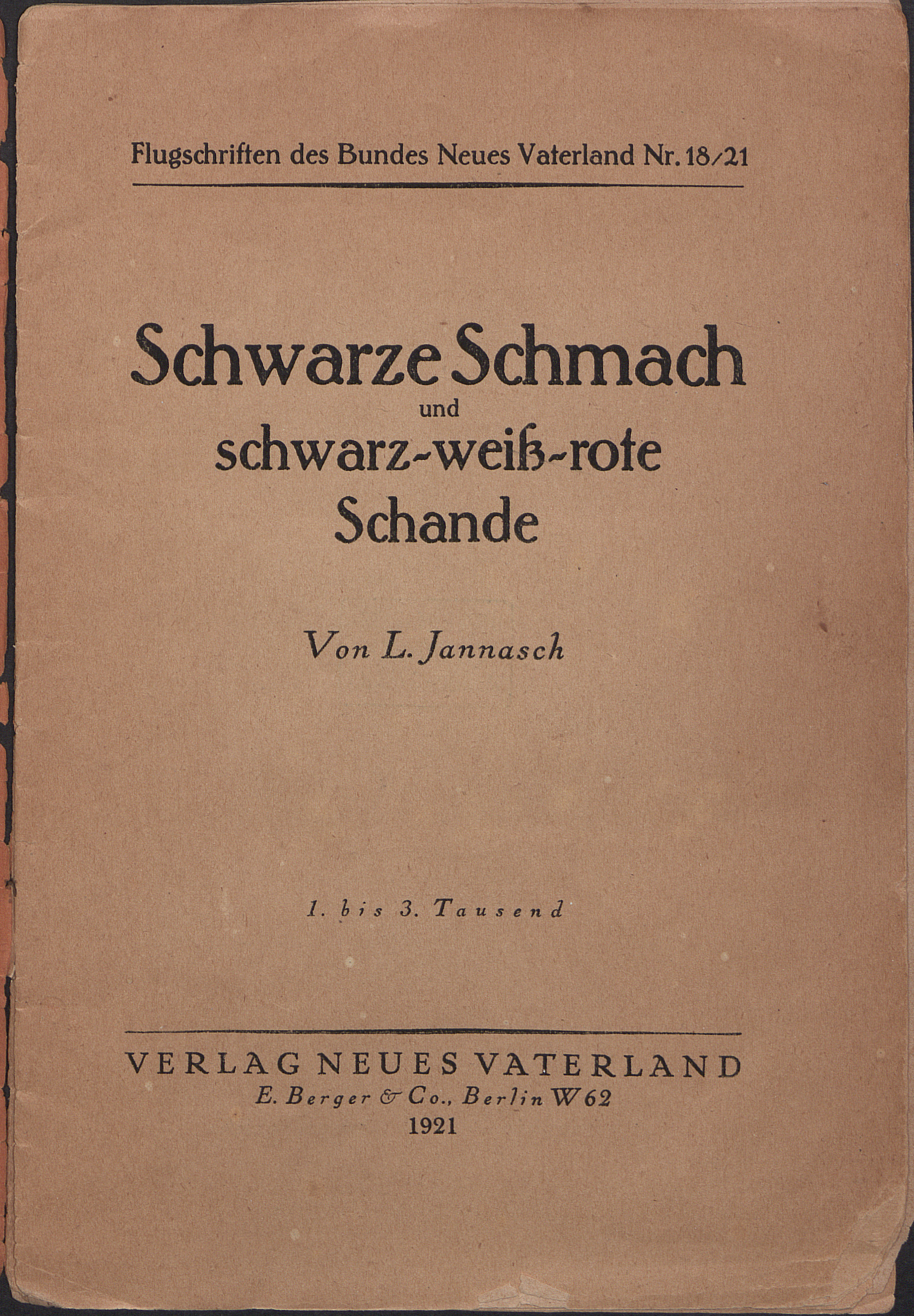
- Born: 1872
- Died: 1968 (aged 95–96)
- Occupations: Pacifist, activist, journalist, graphologist
- Organization(s): German Society for Ethical Culture; Bund Neues Vaterland (New Fatherland League); Women's International League for Peace and Freedom; German League for Human Rights

Lilli Jannasch (1872 – 1968) was a German feminist, pacifist, journalist, graphologist, and co-founder of the pacifist organisation Bund Neues Vaterland.

== Early life ==
Lilli Jannasch was born in 1872, the daughter of a German bank director and a French mother. Little is known about her early life, but Jannasch became a distinguished member of the German peace movement.

== Bund Neues Vaterland (New Fatherland League) ==
Jannasch was a member of the Gesellschaft für ethische Kultur (Society for Ethical Culture), founded by Friedrich Wilhelm Foerster, a philosopher and peace campaigner, and of Deutscher Monistenbund, 'a scientistic quasi-religion founded by the German zoologist and evolutionary proponent Ernst Haeckel'. It was through the Society for Ethical Culture, of which she had been a member since the beginning of the 20th century, that Jannasch became involved with organised pacifism. She had also been a contributor to the Society's journal, Ethische Kultur, and was a founding member of the German League for Secular and Moral Education in 1906. In 1908, she was a delegate at the first International Moral Education Congress.

Jannasch did not believe that any form of militarism or imperialism, regardless of its national origin, could ever be regarded as 'ethical'. In 1914, Jannasch, along with Albert Einstein, Otto Lehmann-Russbuldt, Kurt von Tepper-Laski, and others, founded the Bund Neues Vaterland (New Fatherland League). Earlier that year, Jannasch had established the Neues Vaterland publishing house in Berlin, which published Lehmann-Russbüldt's Die Schépfung der Vereinigten Statten von Europa (The Creation of the United States of Europe). The League was pacifist, and described as:

a heterogeneous group of people whose opposition [to] the war politics of the German Imperial establishment glued them together. It comprised conservatives, liberals, democrats, socialists, pacifists, internationalists, and philanthropists from all sectors of the middle class and from nobility.

Jannasch became the BNV's Secretary and administrative director. She publicly opposed Germany's annexation policy, advocating instead for peace negotiations and increased democracy. In 1916, the German authorities prohibited the BNV from any public activity, and in March, Jannasch was arrested and imprisoned, without trial, for four months on charges of treason. Her release was due to the active efforts of family and friends, including Hugo Haase. Though banned from any political activity for the remainder of the war, Jannasch continued her pacifist activism. She was a staunch critic of the Church for its pro-war stance and antipathy to pacifism.

== Postwar activism ==
Jannasch was active in the German branch of the Women's International League for Peace and Freedom, and was a member of the International Secretariat for Education in the Spirit of Pacifism. Through these, and in numerous articles, she advocated for international reconciliation, conscientious objection, and widespread peace education.

Jannasch was also an outspoken critic of the so-called Black Horror on the Rhine, decrying it as both racist and sexist. The Black Horror referred to 'repeated charges voiced in the German press and elsewhere of wholesale abuses of women and children committed by the French colored troops garrisoned in the occupied territory along the Rhine'. E. Kuhlman describes Jannasch's as 'the most trenchant critique of the Rhineland Horror campaign'. Kuhlman writes that in an article for a German magazine in November 1920:

Jannasch compared the crusade's antics to the German folktale the "Pied Piper of Hamelin," in which the piper (in this case, the Rhineland Horror campaigners) played irresistible music (of revenge, chivalric honor, and female protection) while making irresponsible claims (about the African soldiers). The German people, observed Jannasch, were being lured into a never-ending cycle of revenge by the campaign's inflated claims of dishonour at the hands of the colonial troops. Jannasch explained that in using colonials, the French were perpetuating the spirit of retribution instigated by the spirit of retribution instigated by the aggressive, baiting methods begun by the Germans during the war, particularly in their own occupation of Belgium and part of France.

Jannasch shared her own experience of living in postwar Rhineland under occupation, and the reported popularity of African soldiers among local people. She also highlighted the former occupation by Germany of parts of France, and the deportation of thousands of women and girls in 1916 for forced agricultural labour. The mistreatment by German troops of those in occupied territories, Jannasch argued, was being forgotten or ignored. Jannasch's article was reported in The Crisis. Friedrich Wilhelm Foerster also published a pamphlet in 1921 condemning the conduct of Germans during the war, but he and Jannasch were exceptions to the prevailing spirit in postwar Germany. Of this, Jannasch wrote that:

The courageous proclamation of the truth is taxed with treason, and the person who obstinately sticks to this task is immediately singled out for the bullets and clubs of the Pangermanists.'

By 1922, the contentious ‘black shame campaign’ had largely petered out.

Throughout the postwar years, Jannasch worked for Franco-German rapprochement, continuing to decry militarism and nationalist propaganda. In 1923, she established a 'fund for reconciliation with the French and Belgian people', in an effort to acknowledge and make reparations for the destructive impact of the German troops in occupied areas of France of Belgium. A considerable sum was raised, and given to French pacifist Marc Sangnier at the Third International Democratic Congress. In 1924, Jannasch published a book documenting German war crimes and breaches of international law,: Untaten des Militarismus. This was translated into French as Les Atrocités allemandes de la grande guerre des documents authentiques (1925), and into English as German Militarism at Work: A Collection of Documents (1926).

Jannasch lectured widely, and attempted to counter anti-French propaganda in the German press by publishing information about pacifist efforts and Franco-German reconciliation. She founded the German League for Human Rights, and helped to initiate the Franco-German League in the Rhineland. Though some women peace activists kept a conscious separation from male activists, viewing war as 'an expression of male dominance in society', Jannasch was among those who 'preferred to emphasize their solidarity with male peace activists such as the exiled French writer Romain Rolland or the German socialist Eduard Bernstein.'

== Later years ==
In the latter years of the 1920s, Jannasch became disillusioned in the face of growing nationalistic feeling in Germany. She withdrew from political activity and worked as a graphologist in Wiesbaden and Frankfurt. Following the Nazi seizure of power in 1933, Jannasch's house was raided and she underwent interrogation by Frankfurt police. She fled to France, settling in Strasbourg, and continuing to work as a graphologist. Details of her later years are unknown.
