= Weissenbach =

Weissenbach or Weißenbach may refer to the following places:

== Places ==
- municipalities in Austria:
  - Weißenbach am Lech, in Tyrol
  - Weißenbach an der Enns, in Styria
  - Weißenbach bei Liezen, in Styria
  - Gniebing-Weißenbach, in Styria
  - Weißenbach an der Triesting, in Lower Austria
- Weißenbach, a village in northern Italy
- places in Switzerland:
  - Weissenbach, Berne, a place in the municipality of Boltigen
  - Weissenbach, Zurich, a place in the municipality of Bäretswil

== Rivers and creeks ==
- Weißenbach (Inn), a tributary of the Inn in Austria

== People ==
- Jean Weissenbach, a French geneticist
