= Hermann Knüfken =

Hermann Knüfken (9 February 1893 – 8 February 1976) was a German trade unionist, communist activist and anti-fascist.

Knüfken was a sailor who was conscripted into the Imperial German Navy in 1914. In 1917 he deserted, going to Denmark. He returned to Germany after being offered an amnesty but was soon re-arrested. However he was released by sailors during the November Revolution.

In 1921 he hijacked the ship Senator Schröder to transport Franz Jung, Cläre Jung and Jan Appel to the Second World Congress of the Communist International in Moscow.
