= Cläre Jung =

German journalist, writer and political activist

- Born: 23 February 1892; Berlin, German Empire
- Died: 25 March 1981 (aged 89); East Berlin, East Germany
- Other name: Clara Jung
- Occupations: Journalist; Writer
- Spouses: Richard Oehring; Franz Jung

Cläre Jung (2 February 1892 – 25 March 1981) was a German journalist, writer and political activist.

== Early life ==
Cläre Otto enjoyed a middle-class upbringing. Her father was a feed merchant. After finishing at her single-sex secondary school she came into contact with the circle of Berlin-based expressionist poets around Georg Heym, Else Lasker-Schüler and, most notably, Franz Pfemfert. Fritz Mierau would later describe her as "the soul and muse of the little circle". Pfemert edited a left-wing political and literary magazine called Die Aktion: Cläre Otto got to know his fellow contributors to Die Aktion, among them the restless anarchist poet Franz Jung whom she would later marry and under whose shadow, according to some evaluations, she would spend much of her life. However, her first marriage was to another Die Aktion contributor, the writer and political activist Richard Oehring: the two of them were divorced after two years, in 1917. By September 1918 she was living with Franz Jung, although it would be another ten years before the two of them got married.

== Political activism during the German Revolution ==
During the war she worked as a medical assistant at the Moabit Hospital in Berlin between 1915 and 1916. In 1916 she obtained a position as press agency secretary, work with which she continued till 1921. During the revolutionary period that followed the war she was contributing to the journal Russische Korrespondenz, and she was also working as a secretary for the Communist Workers' Party, a breakaway grouping founded in April 1920 by Franz Jung (together with Alexander Schröder, Alexander Schwab and Bernhard Reichenbach) as part of the bewildering political splintering that was a feature of left-wing politics in Germany at the time.

In August 1921 she traveled to Moscow with Franz Jung. The previous year he had visited Lenin, arriving in May 1920 with party comrade Jan Appel. Travel between two states in revolutionary turmoil was not without its challenges. In the absence of regular rail links, a Hamburg-based Communist called Hermann Knüfken was able to smuggle the men onto a steam boat called Senator Schröder: once on board they persuaded the captain to alter course, and were thereby delivered to Murmansk. His journey being illegal, in order to return home he traveled under a false name. Back in Germany, Jung's political activity earned him several months in prison during the early part of 1921. He had already received Soviet citizenship in June 1920 during his visit at that time, and Franz Jung would never lose his compelling enthusiasm for Soviet Russia. Jung was banned from overseas travel, but nevertheless Franz and Cläre managed to cross into Denmark at the end of August 1921, and then obtained a passage to the Soviet Union on a freight steamer called "Flora": the two of them now settled in Moscow. Cläre obtained work as a secretary in the Moscow office of the Comintern Central Committee. After this she helped with reconstruction within the framework of Workers International Relief, and was involved in setting up orphanages in Perm and Jekaterinburg. She later worked, along with Franz Jung, on the rebuilding of the "Ressora" metalwork plant in Petrograd which, by the time circumstances had persuaded them to leave the country in November 1923, was back to producing steel oil barrels and ship building components.

== Living under Nazism ==
She returned to Germany at the end of 1923 with Franz Jung and in 1924 (or 1928) they were married. Jung lowered his political profile and both of them found work in press agency and publishing work. Between 1924 and 1927 she was working for a literary and political publisher in Berlin. In 1927, together with Franz, Cläre took a position with Deutscher Feuilleton Dienst, for which she would still be working, despite the intervening personal and political turmoil, till 1944. During this time, in January 1933, the NSDAP (Nazi Party) took power, which was followed by a rapid retreat from democracy in favour of one- party government. From 1933 Cläre Jung was combining her publishing work with (now illegal) anti-Nazi activism, working with Harro Schulze-Boysen and others to help Jewish and political victims of government oppression, and producing press releases on behalf of non-Nazi, and therefore illegal, news services (so called "Green reports" / "Grüne Berichte"). During this period, in 1937, Franz and Cläre Jung were divorced when Franz, identified as an unquiet government opponent, was obliged to escape to Switzerland (and forced to move on to Hungary two years later). It is clear from subsequent correspondence after 1944 when Franz's daughter (by an earlier marriage) died, that the two did not entirely lose contact following the divorce however.

== Life in East Germany ==
The end of the war in May 1945 put an end to the Nazi regime and, some thought, to single party dictatorship in Germany. Cläre Jung lost no time in joining the Communist Party. In April 1946 a contentious merger between the old Communist Party and the Moderate-left SPD created the basis for a return to one- party rule in this portion of Germany. Jung was one of thousands of Communists who now lost little time in signing their party membership across to the new Socialist Unity Party (Sozialistische Einheitspartei Deutschlands, SED), which had resulted from the merger. 1946 also saw the first appearance of her book Aus der Tiefe rufe ich, described as a novel but in many respects undisguisedly driven by her own experiences, and a work that has received greater attention, more than two decades following the author's death, since the appearance in 2004 of a new edition edited by Monika Melchert. The book deals with the lives of Jewish people in Berlin between 1938 and 1943, swinging between resignation and hope along the route to annihilation. In the post-war years Jung obtained a job as a literary, cultural and popular education editor with Berliner Rundfunk, a radio station established in 1946 and, during its early years, controlled by the Soviet administrators who had taken control of the entire central portion of Germany at the end of the war. By 1952 the Soviet occupation zone had been replaced by the Soviet sponsored German Democratic Republic, established formally in October 1949. In 1952, by now aged 60, Jung took a job as Party Secretary and teacher at the National Ballet Academy in Berlin.

She left the ballet school position in 1955, now working as a freelance writer, making contributions to East German newspapers and magazines. She served as a member of the Berlin region of the Cultural Association of the GDR, and later became a member of the "Seniors' Commission" of the national Union of Journalists.

== Death and a literary afterlife ==
Cläre Jung died in 1981. Her memoir, titled Paradiesvögel (birds of paradise), appeared posthumously in 1987.

== Awards and honours ==
- 1979 Patriotic Order of Merit
- "Golden Feather" from the Union of Journalists
- "Badge of Honour" from the Society for German–Soviet Friendship
