= Proletarian Theatre, Stage of the Revolutionary Workers of Greater Berlin =

The Proletarian Theatre, Stage of the Revolutionary Workers of Greater Berlin was a radical theatre project which was set up in Berlin in October 1920 during the revolutionary period following the November Revolution. It was founded by Hermann Schüller and Erwin Piscator. It was a membership organization with around 5,000 to 6,000 workers as members before it was banned in April 1921. The theatre staged over 50 performances.
