= Arthur Goldstein =

20th-century German journalist and communist politician

Arthur Goldstein (18 March 1887 in Lipine, German Empire – 1943 in Auschwitz, German-occupied Poland) was a German journalist and communist politician.

== Life ==
Goldstein joined the Social Democratic Party of Germany (SPD) in 1914, and was considered part of its left wing. As such, he joined the Independent Social Democratic Party of Germany (USPD) in 1917, and later the Spartacus League, and was a founding member of the Communist Party of Germany (KPD). There he was a supporter of anti-parliamentarian positions, and in 1920 was a co-founder of the Communist Workers' Party of Germany (KAPD) and was its representative for a while on the Executive Committee of the Communist International in Moscow, and was also responsible, along with Karl Schröder and Adolf Dethmann for the party newspaper Kommunistische Arbeiter-Zeitung. Under the pseudonym "Stahl" (steel) he was one of the signatories to the manifesto of the KAPD, which was drafted by Herman Gorter. The first executive committee of the KAPD consisted of Emil Sachs ("Erdmann"), Frederick Wendel ("Friedrich") and Arthur Goldstein ("Stahl"). Together with Schröder and Dethmann, Goldstein was a vigorous opponent of the Hamburg Faction and their supporters in the KAPD, Heinrich Laufenberg and Fritz Wolffheim, who advocated national communism. At the second party congress of the KAPD from 1–4 August 1920 in Berlin-Weißensee, Goldstein argued successfully for the departure from the Hamburg Faction. The 2nd World Congress of the Comintern in July/August 1920 accepted the KAPD as a member, but it left in September 1921.

In 1922 Goldstein was expelled from the KAPD, along with Karl Schröder, as a leading member of the Essen Faction. He made contact with Paul Levi and worked in his newspaper Unser Weg (Our Way) and in 1923 rejoined the SPD.

In Berlin, along with Schröder, from 1928 he changed the Sozialwissenschaftliche Vereinigung (Social Science Association), founded by Levi in 1924, into a council communist cadre organisation, which was to form the core of the Rote Kämpfer (Red Fighters), formed in 1931, in which Goldstein acted as expert on economic matters. In the same period he wrote in social-democratic newspapers such as Vorwärts and maintained contact to other left-wing organisations, such as the Trotskyist Left Opposition.

After the Nazis' rise to power in 1933, Goldstein fled to Paris; after a failed attempt to establish an exile leadership of the resistance movement Rote Kämpfer, he joined the Trotskyist International Communists of Germany, and played a role for a while in their exile leadership.

According to documents in Auschwitz, Goldstein was deported to Auschwitz on 23 June 1943 in a mass transportation of 1018 Jews from Drancy internment camp, near Paris. Immediately upon his arrival on 25 June 1943 he was murdered in the gas chambers by the SS with 517 other Jews.
