= Frida Rubiner =

- Born: Фрида Абрамовна Ицхоки; Frida Abramovna Ichak; 28 April 1879; Marijampolė, Congress Poland, Russian Empire
- Died: 22 January 1952 (aged 72); Kleinmachnow, East Germany
- Occupations: Political activist and revolutionary Writer/journalist; Translator
- Political party: SPD; KPD; KPÖ; SED
- Spouse: Ludwig Rubiner (1881-1920)
- Parent(s): Abraham Ichak; Rosa Stolenska/Ichak

Frida Rubiner (born Frida Ichak / Фрида Абрамовна Ицхоки: 28 April 1879 – 22 January 1952) was a political activist (KPD), writer, journalist and translator of important communist Russian texts into German. Pseudonyms under which she wrote included Georg Rehberg, Arnold Brand and Frida Lang.

== Life ==
=== Family provenance and early years ===
Frida Abramovna Ichak was born into a working class Jewish family in Marijampolė, a midsized multicultural town halfway between Königsberg and Vilnius, today in Lithuania but at that time in Congress Poland, part of the Russian Empire. Abraham Ichak, her father, had an office job. Frida was the eldest of her parents' nine recorded children. She attended an all-girls' school in nearby Kaunas and embarked on an apprenticeship in garment making, subsequently working in the same trade in order to help support the family. During this period one source describes her as an autodidact - finding time to educate herself outside and beyond the basic requirements for making clothes.

=== Student years abroad ===
In the first part of 1899 she enrolled as a student at the Philosophy Faculty of Zürich University where she studied Philosophy, (or according to one moderately respectable source, Philology). She was a student at Zürich between 1899 and 1903. It appears that she interrupted her studies in Zürich for a term in 1900 so as to study Physics at Berlin University. It was at Zürich that she received her doctorate in 1903 or 1906. Some sources, citing articles that she subsequently published, indicate a largely scientific focus for her university studies. The title of her doctoral dissertation implies a mathematical-scientific focus: "Über die Ausnahmestellung der Wärme unter den Energieformen" (loosely: "The exceptional properties of heat as a form of energy"). She managed, with difficulty, to finance her studies only by working, as before, in garment manufacturing. It was while a student in Zürich that Frida Ichak first met, among other politically like-minded individuals, the exiled Russian political activist, Vladimir Ilyich Ulyano (Lenin). They would remain in touch.

=== Politics and marriage ===
Frida Ichak relocated in 1906, to Frankfurt where she joined the Social Democratic Party (SPD). She moved again in 1908, to Berlin where she was politically active and worked as a Maths teacher. It was here that she met the Galician anarcho-communist expressionist writer Ludwig Rubiner. They married towards the end of 1911 while on a visit to London. Through her husband she came into contact with a circle of anarchist-artists. Very soon she was collaborating with her husband to produce translations of Russian novels, for instance those of Gogol. There is a lack of agreement between the sources as to where they were based for the next few years, but the Rubiners appear to have been living in Paris during 1913 and the first part of 1914, then relocating to Berlin. War erupted in July 1914 and by May 1915 they were living together in Zürich: Switzerland was less directly affected by the fighting than the "great powers", Germany, Russia, Britain and France. The Rubiners were members of the "Zimmerwald" Leftwing group based in Zürich, and close to the group's intellectually formidable leader, the Russian exile Lenin.

During the First World War Frida Rubin and her husband continued to work as translators, their contributions including Tolstoy translations into German. Frida Rubiner also produced, in 1918, the first German language version of Lenin's The State and Revolution. The Rubiners remained politically engaged during their wartime years in Switzerland. A surveillance report filed in 1918 by Swiss authorities and the German embassy refers to a belief on the part of the German General Staff that the Rubiners were the focus in Zürich of a group "central to the international revolution". The same report described Frida Rubiner as a "rabid Bolshevik [who likes to disguise herself as] a poet's pussycat" ("rabiate Bolschewistin [die sich gern als] Dichtergattin [tarne]"). Their association with Lenin (by now creating revolution in St. Petersburg and then Moscow) had not gone unremarked. On the other hand, despite employing detectives, mail intercepts and house searches, the authorities in Zürich failed to find compelling evidence against the Rubiners.

=== Communist, revolutionary and widow ===
In the Autumn of 1918 Frida Rubiner visited Vienna: her motives, according to her own reports, were more artistic than political, and she probably returned to Zürich before the end of the year. Some (though not all) sources indicate that one or both of the Rubiners were expelled from Switzerland at the end of 1918. In February 1919 they returned to Berlin, and while Ludwig Rubiner took a job with a publishing house, his wife embarked on a trip to Kaunas and Vilnius to visit relatives in the war torn former western territories of the Russian Empire. She (probably) participated - possibly without any "official mandate" - in the founding congress of the Communist International (Comintern) which took place in Moscow early in March 1919. She had certainly been an early member - some sources say one of the (many) co-founders earlier that year - of the Communist Party of Germany.

Germany's military defeat was followed by a series of revolutions across the country, many drawing inspiration from the Russian Revolution. Frida Rubiner participated in the briefly successful Munich Soviet ("Workers' state"). The precise nature and extent of her contribution remains unclear, but it is recorded that, adopting the name "Friedjung", she became a member of the soviet's propaganda committee. She was arrested and, after several months held in "Investigative custody", convicted of high treason and sentenced on 9 December 1919 to a twenty-one month jail term. In the event, like many others detained under similar circumstances, she was released much sooner, emerging from Stadelheim Prison early in 1920.

Her husband died in a Berlin clinic during the night of 27/28 February 1920. One source states that Ludwig Rubiner died because of a lung disease that lasted six weeks, while another states simply that he died during an influenza epidemic. Their marriage had been childless.

=== Journalist and party activist ===
Between 1920 and 1922 Frida Rubiner lived in Vienna where she worked as a critic, correspondent and contributing editor for communist newspapers, notably the Vienna edition of Rote Fahne (Red Flag). Between 1922 and 1924 she was based in Moscow, working as a correspondent for the multi-lingual Marxist magazine Inprecor. During this time she was also a member of a Soviet Communist Party cell and sat on the influential Executive Committee of the Communist International. Meanwhile, beyond the world of political activism, by the early 1920s she had already translated into German works by the revolutionary communicators Trotsky, Bukharin and Radek.

In 1924 the party ordered her back to Germany where she took over as political editor of the Berlin based Rote Fahne (Red Flag) newspaper. A new "hard left" leadership under Ernst Thälmann had recently taken control of the party, and while this had led to defections and expulsions of members, this new party régime, with its less critical view of the Soviet Union, was one with which Frida Rubiner herself was in closer sympathy. She remained at the Rote Fahne till 1927 and also, during these years, undertook various important party propaganda roles. She spent some time in Thuringia in order to lead a propaganda offensive against Guido Heym and the "Lenin League" ("Leninbund"). In 1925 Rubiner was a founding member of the "Working Community of Communist Authors" ("Arbeitsgemeinschaft kommunistischer Schriftsteller"). In 1928 she took over, briefly, as head of the National Party Academy, shortly before it relocated from Dresden to Fichtenau on the edge of Berlin. However, she left the post in summer 1929, and, at her own request, she returned to the Soviet Union. By November 1929 she at settled in Moscow.

=== In the Soviet Union ===
During the late summer of 1929 Rubiner undertook a river cruise, taking in the Volga and other river systems. A product of this adventure, published in 1930, was her book "The great river. An unromantic Volga journey" ("Der große Strom. Eine unromantische Wolgafahrt").

Between November 1929 and 1930 she was employed in the Academic Department of the Marx-Engels-Lenin Institute in Moscow. Her work involved further translations into German of Lenin's writings. However, as she later recalled, the institute at that time was controlled by David Riazanov and a "Menshevik-Trotskyite clique". The Soviet political leadership by this stage was increasingly divided between the backers of Stalin and those whom Stalin perceived - in many cases correctly - as potential rivals for power. As a backer of the Stalin faction Rubiner was necessarily engaged in what she later described as an active struggle ("einen aktiven Kampf") against the non-Stalinists still exercising influence at the institute. After a year the Communist Party Central Committee transferred her to the Central Committee administrative apparatus. Her job here, during 1931/32, is variously described as "instructor", "propagandist" or "head of political work among German workers".

In 1932, at the grandly titled "first world congress" of the International Red Aid (IRH - workers' welfare) organisation, Rubiner was elected to a senior secretarial post with IRH, which she held between December 1932 and August 1933. Later she moved to the Executive Committee of the Communist International (ECCI) where between 1932 (or 1933) and 1935 she headed up a department in the Press section. In the wake of the murder of Sergey Kirov at the end of 1934 the ECCI underwent a general "personnel purge", and Rubiner was the subject of a denunciation from a cell within the ECCI criticising her "insufficient vigilance", based on the assertion that she had numbered among her acquaintances ECCI colleagues identified as "enemies of the people". The reprimand was soon cancelled by the relevant Moscow Committee control commission. Through the Stalinist purges of the later 1930s, any surveillance to which Rubiner was subject seems to have been relatively benign. In 1936 she acquired Soviet citizenship.

Between 1936 and 1939 Rubiner served as a press department chief in the Soviet Literature Agency, responsible for providing the "bourgeois foreign press" with material on the Soviet Union. From 1939 till 1941 she returned to work as a contributing editor, this time with the Moscow-based Publisher for Foreign Language Literature, as "German editor, Category 1 for Marxist Classics (Lenin/Stalin)", as she later identified the role. From a Soviet perspective, the Great Patriotic War (Second World War) between the Soviet Union and Nazi Germany began only in June 1941. Between 1941 and 1945 Frida Rubiner worked in the political central administration of the Red Army as head of a re-education programme ("Umschulungsprogramm") for German prisoners of war. She was also involved in the Soviet sponsored National Committee for a Free Germany ("Nationalkomitee Freies Deutschland" / NKVD ), focusing on radio propaganda broadcasting.

After the war ended, formally in May 1945, she remained initially in Moscow, working again with the Publisher for Foreign Language Literature and also, between July 1945 and January 1946, continuing her involvement with the NKVD. Also during 1945/46 she was teaching at a Communist Party school near Moscow.

With the war over, a large area surrounding Berlin was administered as the Soviet occupation zone, where a group of committed communists who had spent the war in Moscow, carefully refining the planning for a postwar Germany, were by now preparing the ground for a new kind of German state. Two months after the contentious creation of a new kind of German Communist Party, the Socialist Unity Party ("Sozialistische Einheitspartei Deutschlands" / SED), in June 1946 Frida Rubiner was ordered back to Germany, possibly at the request of the German communist leaders working with Walter Ulbricht in the Soviet zone of Germany.

=== In the Soviet occupation zone / German Democratic Republic ===
Almost immediately on her return to Germany, in July 1946 Frida Rubiner was installed as Dean of the Faculty for Basic Questions of Marxism–Leninism at the Party Central Committee's "Karl Marx" party academy in Berlin-Liebenwalde (relocated later to Berlin-Kleinmachnow). Her appointment combined both administrative and teaching duties. She also continued with her party journalism and translation work.

At the start of 1948 she fell ill and returned, for a period, to Moscow, spending much of the ensuing year in Soviet hospitals. By the middle of February 1949 she was back in Germany where a couple of months later Leipzig University marked her seventieth birthday by awarding her an honorary doctorate. She returned to Moscow for medical treatment after being badly injured by a fall on the stairs, but by the time she died on 22 January 1952 she was back in Kleinmachnow, the prestigious Berlin suburb where the East German party leadership had their homes.
