= Hermann Schüller =

German writer and Communist activist

Hermann Schüller (1893–1948) was a German writer and Communist activist. He was one of the founders of the League for Proletarian Culture in 1919. In October 1920, with Erwin Piscator he founded the Proletarian Theatre, Stage of the Revolutionary Workers of Greater Berlin.

== Räte-Zeitung ==
In 1919 Schüller wrote for the Räte-Zeitung. He also produced a series of pamphlets called Der Aufbau: Flugblätter an Jugend. Three of these were written by himself. Hans Reichenbach contributed Volume 5 Student und Sozialismus.

== Der Aufbau: Flugblätter an Jugend ==
Der Aufbau: Flugblätter an Jugend (Structure: Pamphlets for Youth) was a series of pamphlets produced by Schüller:

1. Revolution - Aufbau by Hermann Schüller 6pp
2. Der Bund Aufbau by Hermann Schüller 6pp
3. Die Freie Hochschulgemeinde by Hermann Schüller 6pp
4. Die Hochschulgemeinde : die Ideologie eines Hochschulprogramms aufgestellt von der Freien Hochschulgemeinde Marburg by Hermann Schüller 11pp
5. Student und Sozialismus : mit einem Anhang: Programm der Sozialistischen Studentenpartei by Hans Reichenbach 7pp
6. Erweckung der Universität by Hinrich Knittermeyer 11pp
7. Zur Erneuerung der Geschichtswissenschaft by Walther Koch 10pp
8. Erziehung zur Gemeinschaft by H. G. Nathansohn, 6pp
9. ?
10. Die aufbauende Gemeinschaft by Fritz Klatt, 10pp

== Works ==
- "Proletkult Proletarisches Theater", Der Gegner, Volume 1, Number 4, August 1920
