= Frederick Wendel =

German journalist (1886–1960)

Frederick Wendel (12 May 1886, in Koslin – 8 March 1960, in Kiel) was a German political activist, journalist, author and co ran the Book Circle book club with Karl Schröder.

Frederick Wendel was the son of a carpenter. He completed an apprenticeship as a book printer. In 1907 he joined the Social Democratic Party of Germany (SPD) owing to the influence of Lily Braun. He joined the Imperial German Army during the First World War. Following the German Revolution of November 1918, Wendel was initially a member of the newly founded Communist Party of Germany (KPD) in Berlin, but together with Karl Schröder he sided with the majority Left Communists, which in April 1920 led to the break away of the Communist Workers' Party of Germany (KAPD). Together with Arthur Goldstein Wendel belonged to the first Executive Committee of the KAPD. However, unlike Goldstein, he was sympathetic to the Hamburg faction grouped around Fritz Wolffheim and Heinrich Laufenberg. Whereas he had been involved in the editorial team of the KAPD paper, Kommunistische Arbeiter-Zeitung, he was removed from this position in June 1920, and left the KAPD following the departure of the Hamburg faction. However he rejoined the SPD.

Wendel returned to the SPD and in 1924 set up the Book Circle to provide political books for the workers' movement.
