= Karl Schröder (German politician) =

German Council Communist political activist, publisher and writer

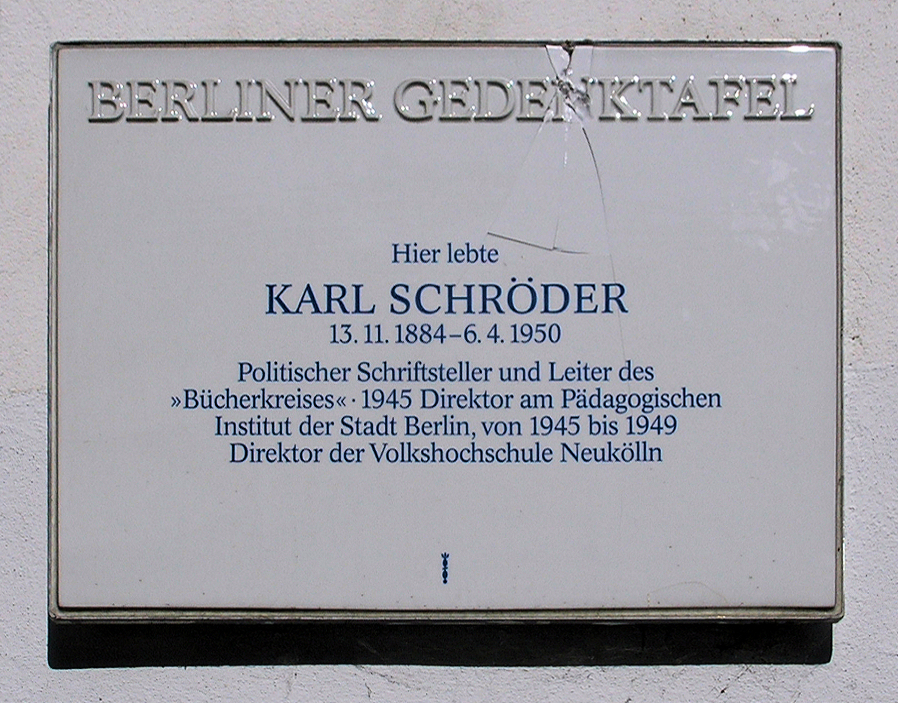
Memorial in Berlin

Karl Bernhard Fritz Schröder (13 November 1884 in Polzin – 6 April 1950 in West Berlin) was a communist politician and writer.

== Life ==
Schröder was the son of a teacher. He went to Berlin where he studied philosophy, literature, history and art history. He gained his doctorate with a dissertation on art history. He then worked as a private tutor. By 1913 he was a member of the Social Democratic Party of Germany (SPD) and in 1914 became a research assistant at the SPD Zentralbildungsausschuss for workers' education. During this period, he became friends with Franz Mehring and developed his connection to the labor movement.

After participating in the First World War, Karl Schroeder joined the Spartacus League in 1918, and shortly afterwards was appointed editor of Rote Fahne (Red Flag), the central organ of the Communist Party (KPD). In 1919 he was expelled from the KPD along with the majority of the party who went on to form the Communist Workers' Party of Germany (KAPD). Alongside Alexander Schwab, he rose to become a leading member of the KAPD and the editor of the Arbeiter-Zeitung (Workers newspaper). He travelled to Moscow where he met Lenin, Trotsky and Bukharin. After the Third Congress of the Comintern (22 June - 12 July 1921), he distanced himself from the Comintern and was expelled from the KAPD in 1922 as leader of the Essen Tendency.

After the attempt to develop the KAPD in Essen failed, Schröder returned to the SPD at the instigation of Paul Levi. In subsequent years, he became a novelist, editor and publisher active in the social democratic workers' education service. He was also active in the Sozialistische Arbeiter-Jugend (SAJ). As Schröder retained his Councilist approach, and sought to gain support for these views in the SAJ and SPD, this could be regarded as entryism.

In 1928 with support from Frederick Wendel, Karl Schröder became head of Circle Books, a Berlin book club. He held this position until 1932. (Both knew each other from the Berlin group of KAPD.) Also in 1928, together with Alexander Schwab, he began to organise the Council Communist Rote Kämpfer (Red Fighters). After the Nazi seizure of power, Schroeder worked as a bookseller in Berlin. The Gestapo penetrated the Rote Kämpfer in 1936, and arrested Schroeder. The following year he was sentenced to four years in prison and then detained in several concentration camps. In Börgermoor he met up with his longtime collaborator Alexander Schwab.

In 1945 he was close to death, but he recovered again. He worked for the reconstruction of the Berlin school system and adult education. At the same time he tried to reorganise in former members of the Rote Kämpfer in West Berlin. In 1948 he joined the SED, which his associates claim was tactically motivated, to gain a lecturing position.
