= Senator Schröder (ship) =

History
- Name: Senator Schröder (1908–23); Victoire (1923–45)
- Owner: Cuxhavener Hochseefischerei AG (1908–14); Reichsmarine (1914–18); Unknown (1923–41); Kriegsmarine (1941–45)
- Port of registry: (German Empire) Cuxhaven, Germany (1908–14); Reichsmarine (1914–18); (Weimar Republic) Cuxhaven, Germany (1918–23); Belgium (1923–41); Kriegsmarine (1941–45); Antwerp, Belgium (1945– )
- Builder: Eider Werft AG, Tönning
- Yard number: 81
- Launched: 26 February 1908
- Completed: 20 March 1908
- Commissioned: 23 December 1914 (Reichsmarine); 4 June 1941 (Kriegsmarine)
- Identification: Fishing boat registration HC 13 (1908–14); Code Letters RPVW (1908–18); Pennant Number V 427 (1941–42); Pennant Number V 1337 (1942–44); Pennant Number V 1419 (1944–45)

General characteristics
- Tonnage: 255 GRT 72 NRT
- Length: 38.16 m (125.2 ft)
- Beam: 7.05 m (23.1 ft)
- Draught: 4.15 m (13.6 ft)
- Depth: 3.70 m (12.1 ft)
- Installed power: Triple expansion steam engine, 49nhp
- Propulsion: Single screw propeller
- Speed: 10 knots (19 km/h)
- Crew: 25

Senator Schröder was a German trawler used as a Vorpostenboot during the First and Second World Wars. Launched in 1908 as a fishing trawler, she became a research vessel in the inter-war period.

== Description ==
The ship 38.16 metres (125 ft 2 in) long, with a beam of 7.05 metres (23 ft 2 in). She had a depth of 3.70 metres (12 ft 2 in) and a draught of 4.15 metres (13 ft 7 in). She was assessed at 255 GRT, 72 NRT. She was powered by a triple expansion steam engine, which had cylinders of 33 centimetres (12 4/5 in), 52 centimetres (20 1/2 in) and 82 centimetres (32 3/16 in) diameter by 56 centimetres (22 in) stroke. The engine was built by [Eider Werft AG, Tönning, Germany. It was rated at 49nhp. It drove a single screw propeller. It could propel the ship at 10 knots (19 km/h).

== History ==
Senator Schröder was built as yard number 81 by Eider Werft AG, Tönning. She was launched on 26 February 1908 and completed on 20 March. Owned by the Cuxhavener Hochseefischerei AG, her port of registry was Cuxhaven. She was allocated the Code Letters RPVW, and the fishing boat registration HC 13.

On 23 December 1914, Senator Schröder was requisitioned by the Reichsmarine for use as a vorpostenboot. She was allocated to the Vorpostenflotille Flandern. SMS Senator Schröder was scuttled as a blockship at Ostend, West Flanders, Belgium on 10 October 1918. She was refloated in 1919, repaired and returned to her pre-war owners. The ship was hijacked by Hermann Knüfken in 1921 to facilitate Franz Jung, Cläre Jung and Jan Appel attending the Third World Congress of the Communist International in Moscow.

In May 1923, she was sold to Belgium. Converted to a research ship, she was renamed Victoire. On 4 June 1941, she was seized by the Kriegsmarine and entered service as a vorpostenboot, serving with 4 Vorpostenflotille as V 427 Victoire. On 10 October 1942, she was transferred to 13 Vorpostenflotille and redesignated V 1311 Victoire. On 1 November 1944, she was transferred to 14 Vorpostenflotille and redesignated V 1419 Victoire. In 1945, she was returned to her owners. On 19 August 1945, she became the property of Rederij Letzer, Antwerp, Belgium.

== Sources ==
- Bourrinet, Philippe (2016). The Dutch and German Communist Left (1900–68): 'Neither Lenin nor Trotsky nor Stalin!' - 'All Workers Must Think for Themselves!'. BRILL. ISBN 978-90-04-32593-7.
- Gröner, Erich (1993). Die deutschen Kriegsschiffe 1815-1945 (in German). Vol. 8/I: Flußfahrzeuge, Ujäger, Vorpostenboote, Hilfsminensucher, Küstenschutzverbände (Teil 1). Koblenz: Bernard & Graefe. ISBN 3-7637-4807-5.
