= Otto Lehmann-Russbüldt =

Otto Lehmann-Russbüldt (1 January 1873, Berlin – 7 October 1964) was a German pacifist activist and writer.

== Publications ==
German:

- (1919) Jung-Frühling (autobiographical novel), Berlin
- (1922) Die Brücke über den Abgrund. Für die Verständigung zwischen Deutschland und Frankreich, Berlin
- (1926) Carl Mertens, Otto Lehmann-Rußbüldt, Konrad Widerhold : Die deutsche Militärpolitik seit 1918, Berlin
- (1926) Der Kampf der Deutschen Liga für Menschenrechte, vormals Bund Neues Vaterland, für den Weltfrieden 1914–1927, Berlin
- (1929) Die blutige Internationale der Rüstungsindustrie, Berlin

English:

- (1936) Hitler's wings of death New York: Telegraph Press; Germany's air force London: G. Allen & Unwin
- (1942) Aggression: The origin of Germany's war machine, London: Hutchinson
