= Gniebing-Weißenbach =

- Former municipality
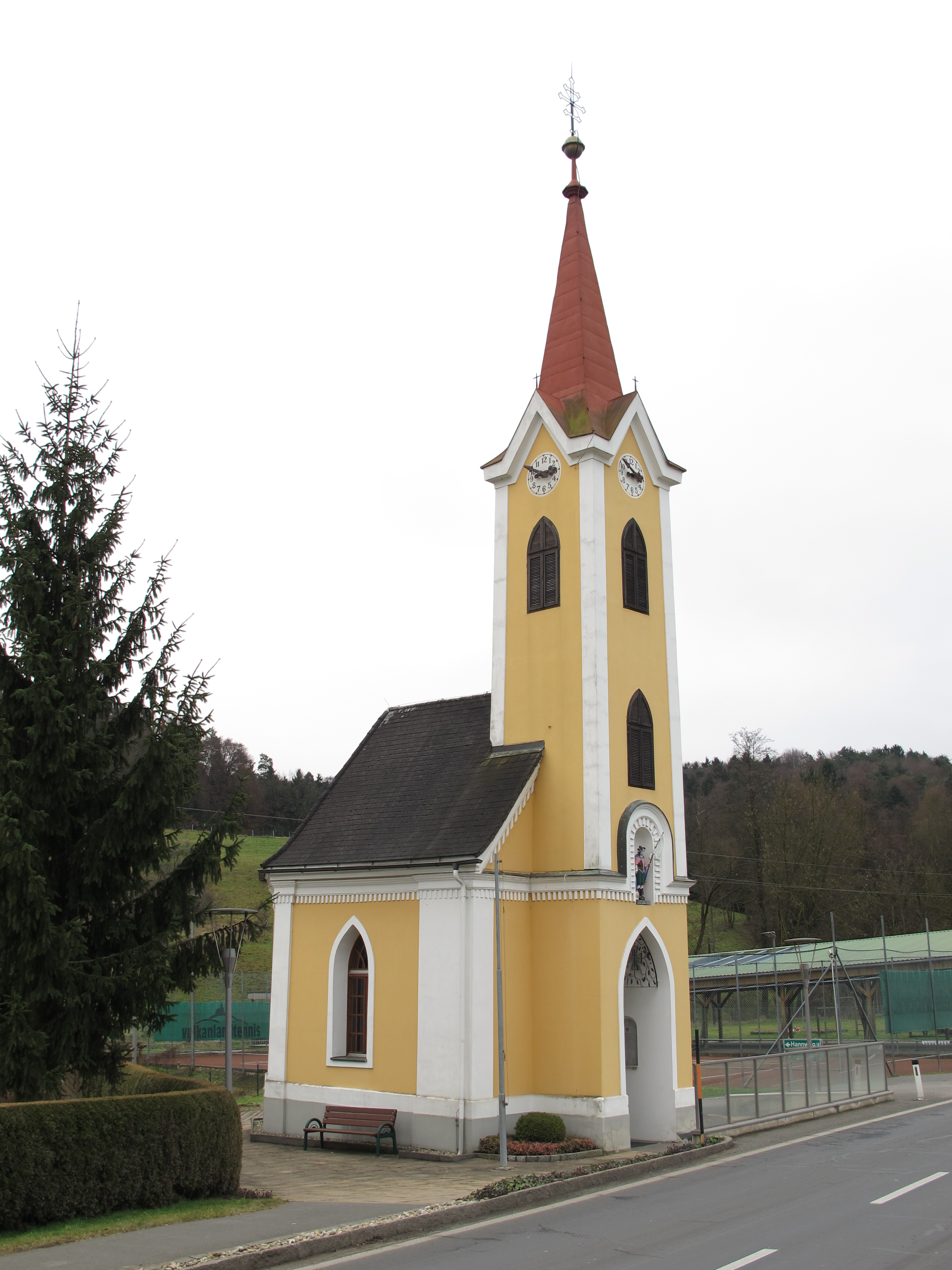
- Chapel in Oberweißenbach

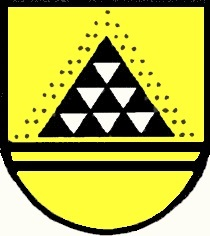
- Coat of arms

- Location within Austria
- Coordinates: 46°58′00″N 15°51′00″E
- Country: Austria
- State: Styria
- District: Südoststeiermark

Area
  - Total: 15.36 km^{2} (5.93 sq mi)
- Elevation: 288 m (945 ft)

Population (1 January 2016)
  - Total: 2,190
  - Density: 143/km^{2} (369/sq mi)
- Time zone: UTC+1 (CET)
  - Summer (DST): UTC+2 (CEST)
- Postal code: 8330
- Area code: +43 3152
- Vehicle registration: FB
- Website: www.gniebing-weissenbach.at

Gniebing-Weißenbach is a former municipality in the district of Südoststeiermark in the Austrian state of Styria. Since the 2015 Styria municipal structural reform, it is part of the municipality Feldbach.

== Population ==
Historical population
Year	Pop.	±%
1869	1,225	—
1880	1,287	+5.1%
1890	1,313	+2.0%
1900	1,293	−1.5%
1910	1,288	−0.4%
1923	1,273	−1.2%
1934	1,442	+13.3%
1939	1,435	−0.5%
1951	1,465	+2.1%
1961	1,544	+5.4%
1971	1,767	+14.4%
1981	1,854	+4.9%
1991	1,940	+4.6%
2001	2,054	+5.9%
2013	2,175	+5.9%
