= Arthur Holitscher =

Hungarian playwright, novelist, essayist and writer

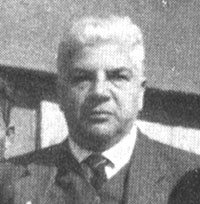
Arthur Holitscher, before 1926

Arthur Holitscher (22 August 1869 – 14 October 1941) was a Hungarian playwright, novelist, essayist and writer on traveling.

Born into an upper middle-class Jewish merchant family in Pest, Hungary, he began his career working for a bank for six years.

His career as a writer began in Germany in the mid-1890s.

== Political involvement with Soviet Russia ==
In September 1917, Holitscher attended the Third Zimmerwald Conference held in Stockholm in the capacity of a correspondent for the Viennese paper Neuen Freien Presse. He was also involved with the pacifist organisation Bund Neues Vaterland (New Fatherland Confederation) and was active as a socialist. In September 1919 Holitscher was invited to meet with Karl Radek at Moabit prison to discuss joining a commission to visit Russia. The proposed commission consisted of experts in agriculture, industry, a former Secretary of State as a specialist in administration, a representative of the Radical Workers of Berlin, and the Chief of Police of a large Swiss city. The German authorities were prepared to sanction this, however they decided to send Radek back to Russia in January 1920 and the proposed commission was shelved. Nevertheless, Holitscher was to take a trip to Russia separately departing for three months in September 1920. This led to the publication of Drei Monate in Sowjet-Russland (Three months in Soviet Russia) in 1921.

=== First Russian Art Exhibition ===
In 1922 he contributed to the foreword to the catalogue for the First Russian Art Exhibition held in Berlin.

== Later life ==
He died in Geneva in 1941.

== Works ==
- Drei Monate in Sowjet-Russland (Three months in Soviet Russia), Berlin 1921.
- Wiedersehen mit Amerika; die Verwandlung der U.S.A. (1930) Berlin: S. Fischer

=== Articles in Die Aktion ===
(See Die Aktion index)

- "Amerikas Literatur", No. 28, 11 July 1914
- "Scham und Läuterung", No. 27/28, 8 July 1916
- "Die Litanei von Atlanta." (translation of material by W. E. B. Dubois), No. 21/22, 19 May 1917
- "Nadja Strasser: Die Russin", No. 24/25, 16 June 1917
- "Gesang an die Lider", No. 23/24, 15 June 1918
- "Aufruhr", No. 8/9, 1 March 1919
