= Friedrich Wilhelm Foerster =

German academic, philosopher, editor and pacifist (1869–1966)

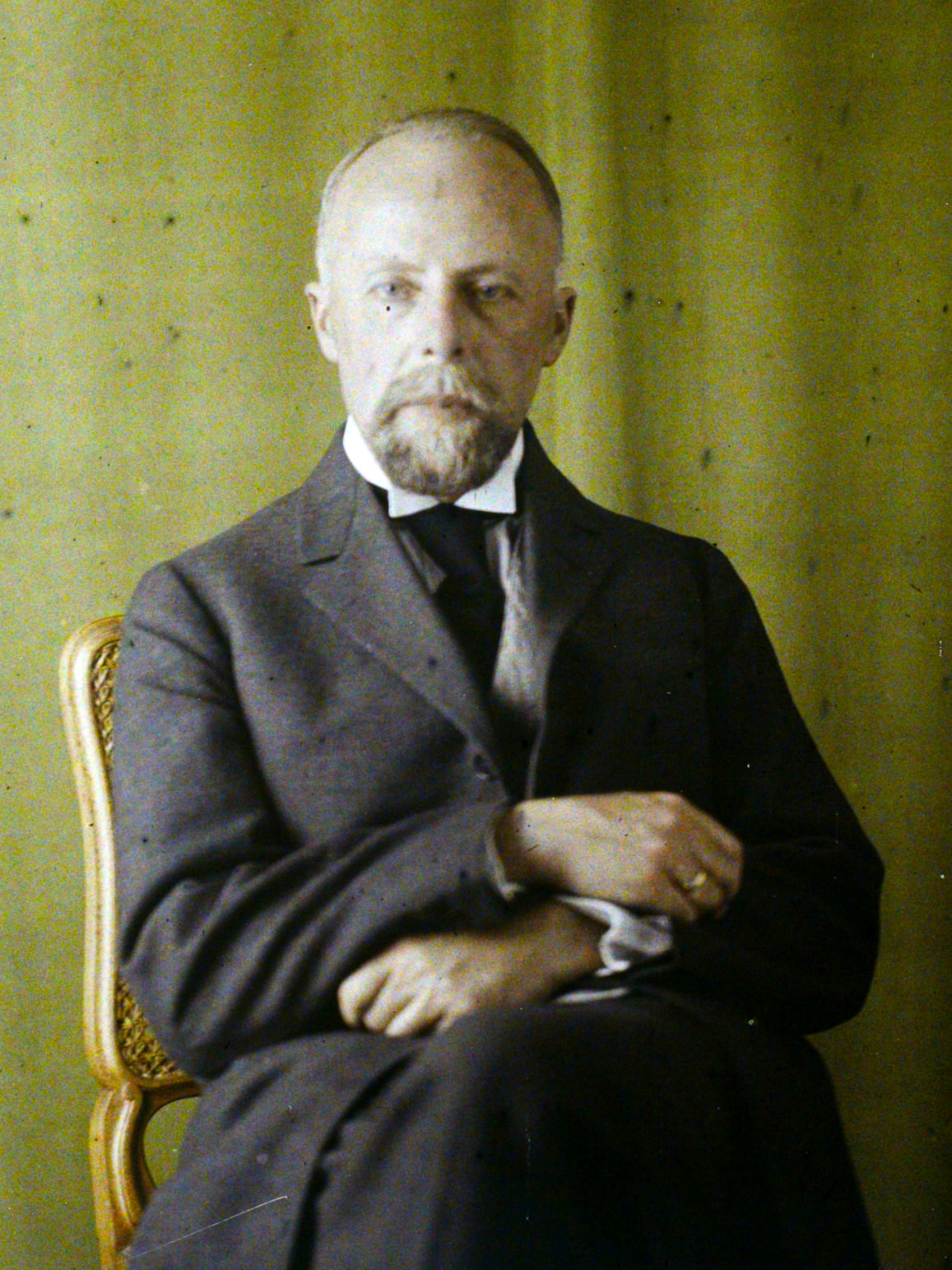
- 1923 Autochrome by Georges Chevalier
- Born: June 2, 1869; Berlin, North German Confederation
- Died: January 6, 1966 (aged 96); Kilchberg, Canton of Zurich, Switzerland

Signature
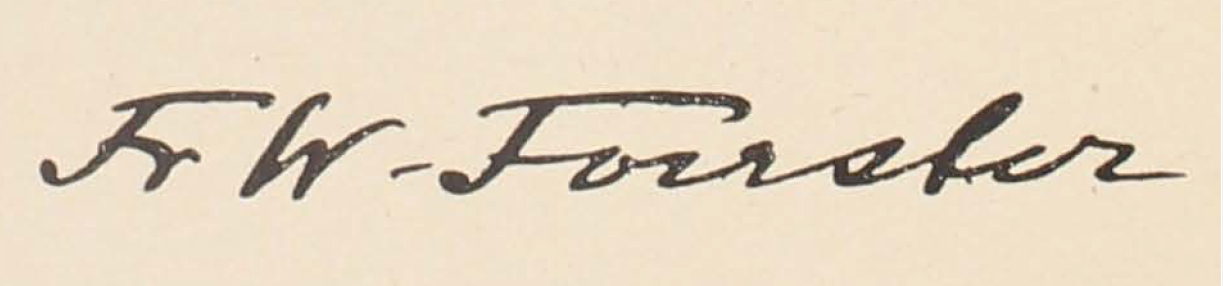

Friedrich Wilhelm Foerster (2 June 1869 – 9 January 1966) was a German academic, educationist, pacifist and philosopher, known for his public opposition to Nazism. His works primarily dealt with the development of ethics through education, sexology, politics and international law.

== Biography ==
=== Early life ===
Foerster was one of the sons of German astronomer Wilhelm Julius Foerster, a director of the Berlin Observatory and a professor at the University of Berlin. His two younger brothers became renowned is various areas in their own right; Karl Foerster as a landscape gardener and horticulturalist, and Dr. Ernst Foerster as a shipbuilder and the director of the shipbuilding division of the Hamburg America Line.

=== Time as a student and academic ===
Friedrich Wilhelm Foerster studied philosophy, economics, ethics and sociology at the University of Freiburg and the University of Berlin. His doctoral thesis was completed in 1893 under the title Der Entwicklungsgang der Kantischen Ethik bis zur Kritik der reinen Vernunft (The development from Kantian ethics to critique of pure reason). From 1898 until 1912 he lectured at the University of Zurich and other Swiss institutions, later lecturing at the University of Vienna and from 1914 at the Ludwig-Maximilians-Universität München.

=== Opposition to German Militarism and persecution by the Nazis ===
Foerster was strongly opposed to the German foreign policy in the era of the First World War, particularly the militaristic attitudes of the ruling elite in Germany. These views made him an exception to the prevailing nationalist tendencies in the German Empire, and due to this and his ethical views he was regularly attacked by nationalist circles.

His criticism of the political legacy of Otto von Bismarck during the war caused a great scandal at his university, and he was dismissed from his post for two semesters. During this time, he returned to Switzerland, where he focused his efforts on the question of to what extent Germany was responsible for the First World War. Foerster became convinced that Germany had blocked the success of the Hague Conventions in 1907, and had thereby isolated itself internationally and drawn a course for war.

When Foerster returned from Switzerland in 1917, he remained convinced that responsibility for the World War lay with the ruling elite in Germany, and particularly with the leaders of the military. His views made him highly unpopular with the conservative factions of German society and he became seen as a key enemy by the newly created national socialist movement.

In 1920, he published his book, Mein Kampf gegen das militaristische und nationalistische Deutschland (My struggle against the militaristic and nationalistic Germany). Following this, he received numerous death threats from right-wing radicals. After Matthias Erzberger and later Walther Rathenau were murdered, Foerster was warned to seek refuge. In 1922 he resigned from his teaching position and fled to Switzerland, later settling in France in 1926. As Foerster continued from a distance to warn against growing German nationalism and the rise of national socialism, he became seen by the Nazis as a major intellectual enemy. After the Nazis seized power in 1933, Foerster's works were among those publicly burnt in ritualised book burnings held across Germany. At the book burning in Berlin on May 10, 1933, the prescribed "fire speech" consigned Foerster's writings to the flames with the words Gegen Gesinnungslumperei und politischen Verrat (Against immoral opportunism and political betrayal). Foerster was on the first list of those whose German citizenship was to be revoked, signed on 23 August 1933 by the Reichsminister for the Interior.

Foerster was well-respected in France and received French citizenship. However, after the occupation of France by the Wehrmacht in 1940, Foerster was immediately wanted by the Gestapo. Foerster, who had been living close to the Swiss border in case of this occurrence, fled to Switzerland. The Swiss authorities, however, refused him asylum, even doubting the legitimacy of his French citizenship and explaining that they considered him to remain a German national. He managed to then flee to Portugal and onwards to the United States.

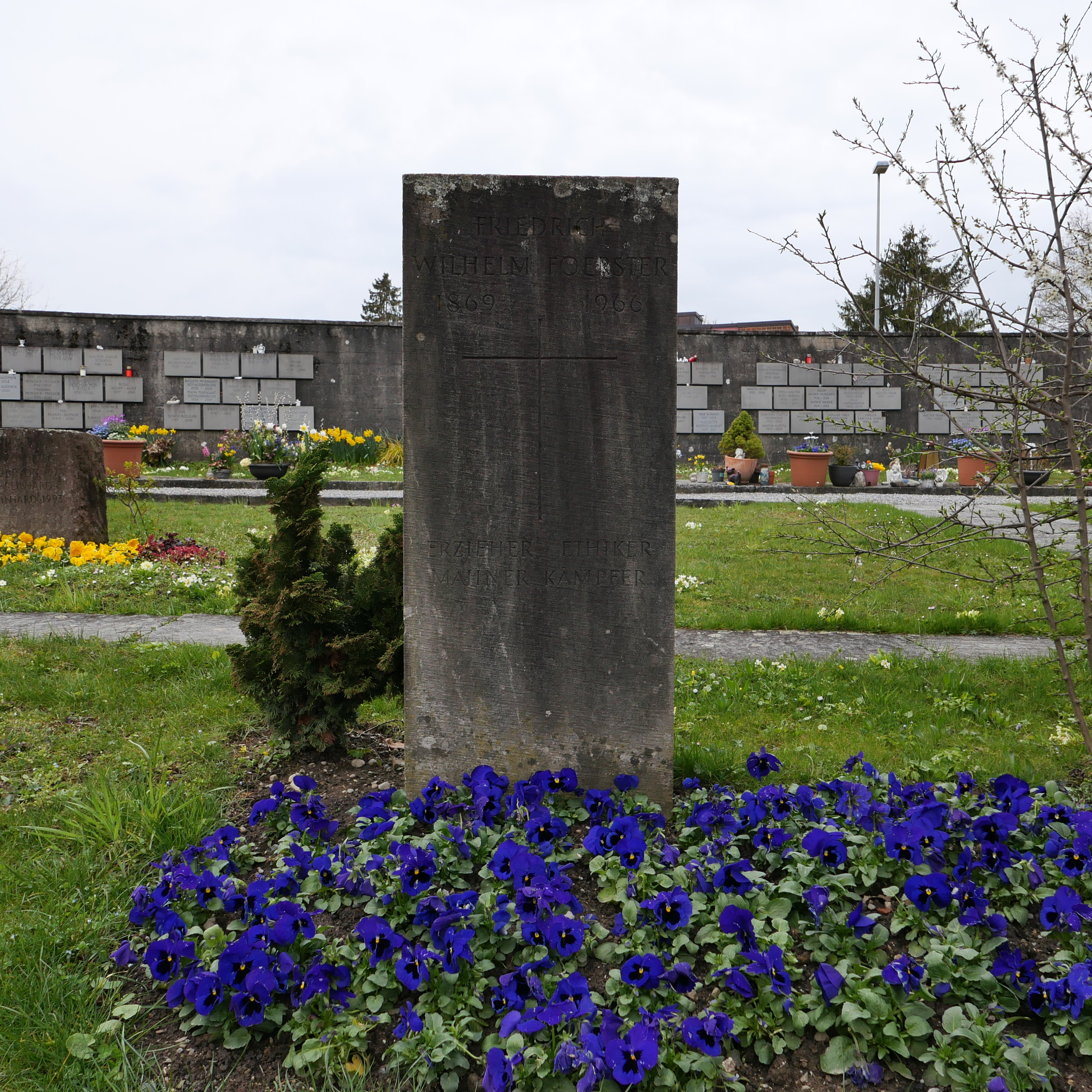
Foerster's grave at the cemetery of Kilchberg with the inscription on the tombstone: "Erzieher Ethiker Mahner Kämpfer" ("educator ethicist admonisher fighter")

=== Post-war ===
Shortly after the end of the Second World War, Foerster wrote an article in the Neue Zürcher Zeitung in which he warned of a "Prussianisation" of the entire world, if the Germans didn't come to "recognition of their horrible guilt" for the crimes committed during the Nazi era and make amends by contributing to the rebuilding of "the noble values of humanity". His memoirs appeared in 1953 under the title Erlebte Weltgeschichte, 1869-1953 (Experienced World History, 1869-1953).

He lived until 1963 in New York City, before returning to Switzerland to spend the last few years of his life in Kilchberg near Zurich.

== Works ==
- Schule und Charakter: Beiträge zur Pädagogik des Gehorsams und zur Reform der Schuldisziplin. Zürich: Schultheß 1907 (15 Auflagen bis 1953). Digital version at archive.org
- Das österreichische Problem. Vom ethischen und staatspädagogischen Standpunkte. 2. Auflage, mit Antwort an die Kritiker, Wien 1916 (1. Auflage 1914).
- Weltpolitik und Weltgewissen. Verlag für Kulturpolitik, München 1919.
- Politische Ethik und politische Pädagogik. 4., stark erweiterte Auflage der „Staatsbürgerlichen Erziehung“. München 1920.
- Sexualethik und Sexualpädagogik. 25.-26.Tsd., Kempten und München 1920.
- Mein Kampf gegen das militaristische und nationalistische Deutschland. Verlag Friede durch Recht, Stuttgart 1920.
- Ewiges Licht und Menschliche Finsternis. Vita-Nova-Verlag, Luzern 1935
- Europa und die deutsche Frage : eine Deutung und ein Ausblick. Vita-Nova-Verlag, Luzern 1937,8by Plon in 1937 in Paris as L' Europe et la question allemande with a foreword from André Chaumeix; and in 1940-41 in New York and London as Europe and the German Question. New York and London: Sheed & Ward and Allen & Unwin. 1940 – via Internet Archive.
- Erlebte Weltgeschichte 1869-1953. Memoiren. Glock und Lutz, Nürnberg 1953.
- Angewandte Religion oder Christsein inmitten der gegenwärtigen Welt. Herder Verlag, Freiburg 1961
- Staatsmänner, Bischöfe und sonstige Strategen, Mittler Verlag, Herford/Bonn 1984 ISBN 3-8132-0188-0
