= Alfons Goldschmidt =

German journalist, economist and university lecturer

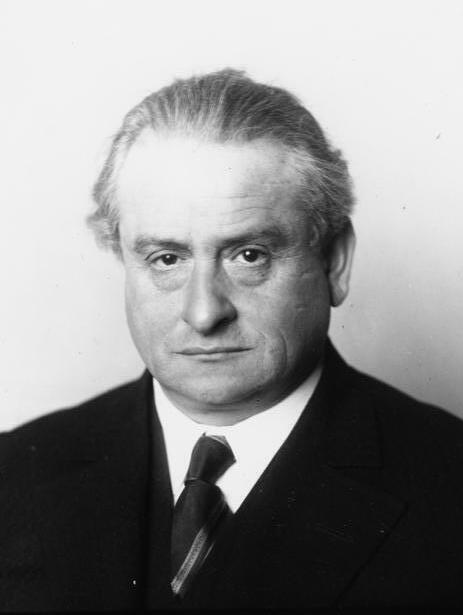
Alfons Goldschmidt in 1923

Alfons Goldschmidt (28 November 1879, Gelsenkirchen – 20 or 21 January 1940, Mexico City) was a German journalist, economist and university lecturer.

== Life ==
Goldschmidt was born in Gelsenkirchen. He was finance editor for Rudolf Mosse's Berliner Tageblatt, and held the chair of economics at the University of Leipzig.

In 1919 he was one of the founders of the League for Proletarian Culture. He was co-editor of Räte-Zeitung with Leo Matthias.

He travelled to the Soviet Russia in 1920, arriving in Moscow on 1 May.

He was chairperson of the German section of Workers International Relief.

A heart attack claimed his life in Mexico City in January 1940. The German-American Writers Association, of which he was a member, made the announcement. Goldschmidt's books were set on fire by the Nazis. He had been invited by the Mexican government to teach at the University of Mexico City for a year.

== Works ==
- Die Wirtschaftsorganisation Sowjet-Russlands (1920) Berlin: Ernst Rowohlt
- Moskau 1920; Tagebuchblätter (1920) Berlin: Ernst Rowohlt
- Argentinien (1923) Berlin: Ernst Rowohlt
- Mexiko (1925)
- Auf Den Spuren Der Azteken (1927)
- Whither Israel? (1934) New York, (with a foreword by Albert Einstein)
- The fate of trade unions under fascism (1937) New York: Anti-fascist literature committee
- Grosse Liebe, weite Welt oder zwischen Rio Bravo und Moskwa : Reise- u. Zeitbilder 1920-1940 (1974) Berlin : Buchverlag Der Morgen
