= Rudolf Leonhard =

German author and communist activist

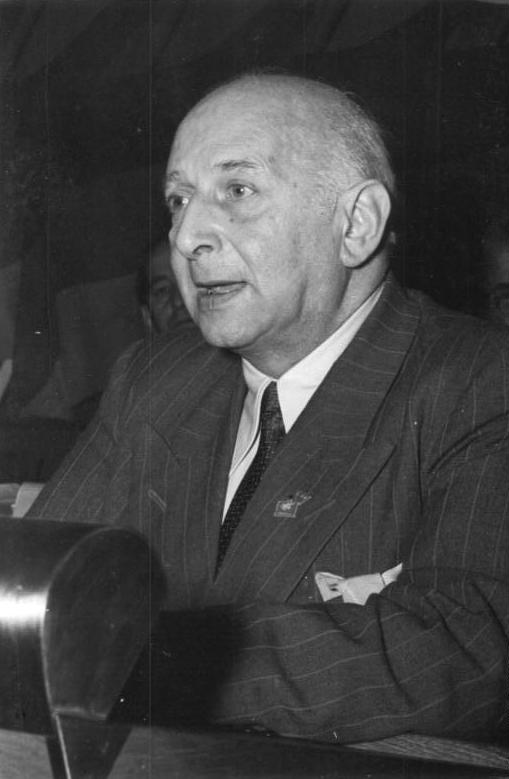
Leonhard

Rudolf Leonhard (27 October 1889, in Lissa, German Empire (today Leszno, Poland) – 19 December 1953, in East Berlin) was a German author and communist activist.

== Life ==
Leonhard came from a family of lawyers and studied law and Philology in Berlin and Göttingen. In 1914 he volunteered for the German military effort in World War I, but quickly converted to pacifism and was brought before a military court for his convictions.

In 1918 he joined the USPD (Independent German Social Democratic Party) and fought alongside Karl Liebknecht and Rosa Luxemburg in the 1918 revolution. In 1919, he joined the KPD (Communist Party of Germany), but left that party in favor of the left-communist KAPD (German Communist Workers’ Party), which he also left after a year. In 1918 he married the author Susanne Köhler, but was divorced from her after one year. However, Susanne had a son Wladimir Leonhard in 1921 (later called Wolfgang), for whom the presumed father was Rudolf.

In the early 1920s he married Frieda Gertrud Riess, a prominent Berlin portrait photographer.

From 1919 onwards he was a freelance author for the publication Die Weltbühne, and from the summer of 1922 he worked for the publishing house Verlag Die Schmiede as a lector and as the editor of a series of books, “Außenseiter der Gesellschaft”. In late November 1925, he began and led the Gruppe 1925 which counted Bertolt Brecht, Alfred Döblin, Albert Ehrenstein, Leonhard Frank, Walter Hasenclever, Walter Mehring and Kurt Tucholsky among its members. After a difference of opinion, Leonhard left the group in 1927.

In March 1928, he moved to Paris at the invitation of his friend Walter Hasenclever and lived with him until 1934. In April 1933, Leonhard took part in the foundation of the „Ligue des Combattants de la Paix" and was co-president of the German sector alongside Albert Einstein. After the “Schutzverband Deutscher Schriftsteller” was taken over by the „Reichsverband deutscher Schriftsteller", he successfully founded the „Schutzverband Deutscher Schriftsteller im Ausland" and became leader of the French section. He describes his experiences in the Spanish Civil War in his collection of stories “Der Tod des Don Quijote”. From 1939 until 1944, he was detained. First he was held in Le Vernet, then he was transferred to Castres. He fled, was recaptured, and eventually fled again, living in underground Marseille until the end of the war.

He returned to Paris in 1944. In 1947 he took part in the first Congress of German Authors. In 1950 he returned to Germany and took up residence in East Berlin. He was very ill at this point. Because he was seen as an immigrant from the West and due to his son's activities, he was only granted a small place on the East German literary scene. He died in 1953.

== Selected works ==
His works include plays, poems, novels, and political essays:

- Angelische Strophen (1913)
- Der Weg durch den Wald (Poems) (1913)
- Barbaren (Ballads) (1914)
- Über den Schlachten (Poems) 1914)
- Äonen des Fegefeuers (Aphorisms) (1917)
- Bemerkungen zum Reichsjugendwehrgesetz (1917)
- Beate und der große Pan (Novel) (1918)
- Katilinarische Pilgerschaft (Poems) (1919)
- Kamp gegen die Waffe (Speech) (1919)
- Briefe an Margit (Poems) (1919)
- Das Chaos (Poems) (1919)
- Die Vorhölle (Tragedy) (1919)
- Poems about "Mother" (1920)
- Alles und Nichts! (Aphorisms) (1920)
- Spartakus-Sonette (1921)
- Die Ewigkeit dieser Zeit. Eine Rhapsodie gegen Europa (1924)
- Segel am Horizont (Drama) (1925)
- Das nackte Leben (Poems) (1925)
- Das Wort (ein sinnliches Wörterbuch der deutschen Sprache, 1932)
- Der Tod des Don Quijote (Poems from the Spanish Civil War, 1938)
- Le Vernet (Gedichtzyklus, entstanden 1939–1944)
- In derselben Nacht (dream journal from his time in Le Vernet, written 1939–1944)
- Geiseln (Tragedy, 1945, dt. 1946)
- Unsere Republik (Essays and Poems, 1951).
- Selected Works in Four Volumes (1961 ff)
