= Franz Jung =

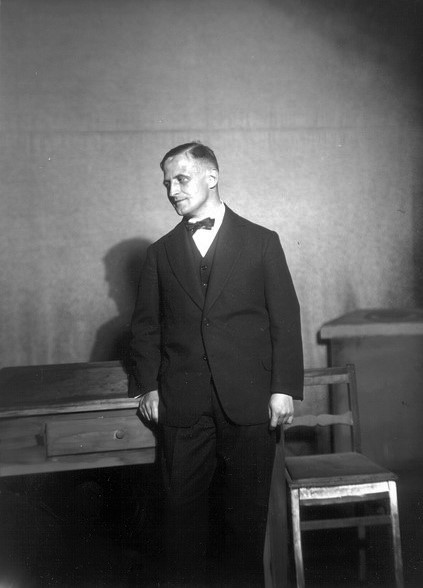
- Portrait of Franz Jung on the occasion of the premiere of his play "Legende", Staatsschauspiel Dresden, October 13, 1927. Photographed on the set.
- Born: 26 November 1888; Neisse, Province of Silesia, German Empire
- Died: 21 January 1963 (aged 74); Stuttgart, Baden-Württemberg, West Germany
- Other names: Franz Larsz; Frank Ryberg
- Occupations: Journalist; Writer; Economist
- Movement: Dadaism; Expressionism
- Spouses: Margot Harder (married 1911–1917?); Cläre Jung (married 1924–1937); Harriet Scherret (married 1937?–1944); Anna von Meissner (married 1944–1947)

Franz Josef Johannes Konrad Jung (26 November 1888 – 21 January 1963) was a writer, economist and political activist in Germany. He also wrote under the names Franz Larsz and Frank Ryberg.

He grew up in Neisse (now Nysa) and was a childhood friend of the poet Max Herrmann-Neisse.

He studied music, law and economics in Leipzig, Jena, Breslau and Munich.

From 1909, he worked as a journalist and soon started writing for Der Sturm and Die Aktion. The Austrian psychoanalyst Otto Gross was a large influence upon him.

He was a member of the League for Proletarian Culture (1919–1920). In 1921, he travelled with Jan Appel to participate in the 3rd World Congress of the Comintern, as a delegate of the Communist Workers' Party of Germany (KAPD). Their clandestine transport involved hijacking the SS Senator Schröder, which was bound for fishing grounds near Iceland, to Murmansk, Russia.

He participated in the March Action (March 1921), and escaped to the Netherlands, where he was captured and deported to the Soviet Union. There he worked for the Workers International Relief during the Volga famine.

He died on January 21, 1963, in Stuttgart, West Germany.
