= Exilliteratur =

German literature written by dissenters of Nazi Germany

Exilliteratur (German pronunciation: [ɛˈksiːl.lɪtəʁaˌtuːɐ̯], lit. 'exile literature') is the name for works of German literature written in the German diaspora by refugee authors who fled from Nazi Germany, Nazi Austria, and the occupied territories between 1933 and 1945. These dissident writers, poets and artists, many of whom were of Jewish ancestry or held anti-Nazi beliefs, fled into exile in 1933 after the Nazi Party came to power and after Nazi Germany annexed Austria by the Anschluss in 1938, abolished the freedom of press, and started to prosecute authors and ban works.

== Writers of prominence ==
The exodus included most writers of prominence.

Many of the European countries, where they first found refuge, were later invaded and occupied by Nazi Germany, which caused the refugees to look for safety elsewhere again, for example by fleeing occupied Europe, taking cover in the "Resistance", or within Inner emigration.

== History and readership ==
Between 1933 and 1939, prolific centers of anti-Nazi German writers and publishers emerged in several European cities, including Paris, Amsterdam, Stockholm, Zürich, London, Prague, Moscow as well as across the Atlantic in New York City, Los Angeles, and Mexico City. Well known for their publications were the publishers Querido Verlag and Verlag Allert de Lange in Amsterdam, Berman-Fischer Verlag in Stockholm, and Oprecht in Zürich.

Like anti-communist Russian writers and publishing houses in Berlin, Paris, London, and New York after the October Revolution, some anti-Nazi German writers and intellectuals saw themselves as the continuation of an older and better Germany, which had been perverted by the Nazi Party.

With this in mind, they supplied the German diaspora with both literary works and with Alternative media critical of the regime, and, in defiance of censorship in Nazi Germany, their books, newspapers, and magazines were smuggled into the homeland and both read and distributed in secret by the German people.

Bertolt Brecht, a refugee member of the Communist Party of Germany, ended up in Los Angeles and noted in his poem "The Hollywood Elegies", that the city was both heaven and hell.

Other exiled German writers often had difficulty expressing what they were truly feeling. In his political thriller The Blond Spider (1939), Hans Flesch-Brunningen, writing under the pseudonym Vincent Burn, wrote a story involving two Germans.

[Flesch-Brunningen created] an older, wiser, and somewhat mysterious German in the character of Martino. He is the archetypical, valiant antifascist and spared any of the ambiguities of Borneman's ultimately vanquished Müller. Yet, as committed and exemplary as Martino may be, he occupies a limited role, overshadowed by the brutal antics of the central German character, the Nazi spy Hesmert. As much as the simple fact of Martino's existence in the novel is indicative of the author's desire to raise British awareness of a "good" Germany, his marginality in the plot may well be equally suggestive of Flesch-Brunningen's sense of caution in dwelling upon a nonpopularist view of German culture.

=== Among German personnel ===
As a highly effective tool of reeducation after American entry into World War II, the libraries of the camps used to intern German prisoners of war in the United States very often included Berman-Fischer's paperback editions of German literature banned under censorship in Nazi Germany. Particularly in demand among POWs were banned novels by refugee writers such as Erich Maria Remarque's All Quiet on the Western Front, Thomas Mann's Zauberberg, and Franz Werfel's The Song of Bernadette. In an article for inter-camp journal Der Ruf, German POW Curt Vinz opined, "Had we only had the opportunity to read these books before, our introduction to life, to war, and the expanse of politics would have been different."

=== Feuchtwanger affair ===
Lion Feuchtwanger, a prominent author in exile in the United States, purchased a mansion in Pacific Palisades, Los Angeles, called Villa Aurora, and used it as a meeting place for exiled German-speaking poets, writers, and intellectuals. Not everything was easy for Feuchtwanger while in exile.

In his book Moskau 1937, Feuchtwanger had lavishly praised life in the Soviet Union under the dictatorship of Joseph Stalin. Feuchtwanger also defended the Great Purge and the Moscow show trials which were then taking place against both real and imagined members of the anti-Stalinist Left and other alleged enemies of the state. Feuchtwanger's enthusiastic praise of Stalinism triggered outrage from fellow anti-Nazi exiles Arnold Zweig, Franz Werfel, and, over the years since, from Trotskyists, who have called Feuchtwanger naive at best.

During the McCarthy era, Feuchtwanger was investigated as an alleged Stalinist propagandist by the House Un-American Activities Committee of the U.S. Congress. Fearing that he would not be readmitted if he travelled abroad, Feuchtwanger never left the United States again. After years of immigration hearings, Feuchtwanger's application for naturalization as an American citizen was finally granted. Ironically, the letter informing Feuchtwanger of the fact only arrived on the day after his death in 1958.

== Exile writers ==
The best known exile writers include Theodor Adorno, Günther Anders, Hannah Arendt, Johannes R. Becher, Bertolt Brecht, Hermann Broch, Ernst Bloch, Elias Canetti, Veza Canetti, Alfred Döblin, Lion Feuchtwanger, Bruno Frank, Oskar Maria Graf, Max Horkheimer, Heinrich Eduard Jacob, Hermann Kesten, Annette Kolb, Siegfried Kracauer, Else Lasker-Schüler, Emil Ludwig, Heinrich Mann, Klaus Mann, Erika Mann, Thomas Mann, Ludwig Marcuse, Robert Musil, Robert Neumann, Erich Maria Remarque, Ludwig Renn, Joseph Roth, Alice Rühle-Gerstel and Otto Rühle, Nelly Sachs, Felix Salten, Anna Seghers, Peter Weiss, Franz Werfel, Bodo Uhse, Max Brod, Stefan Zweig, and Arnold Zweig.

== See also ==
- Die Zeitung, a German-language newspaper published in London during World War II
- Dissident
- Nazi book burnings
- White émigré
