= James Broh =

German lawyer

James Broh (9 November 1867, Perleberg – 1942, Paris) was a German lawyer, publisher and left-wing political activist.

Broh came from a Jewish family and studied law in Berlin. After graduating, he received a doctorate in law and trained for the Prussian judicial service. He joined the Social Democratic Party of Germany during this period. He was encouraged in his legal career by August Bebel and Wilhelm Liebknecht, who hoped that Broh would provide legal defence to Socialist activists. Broh worked as a lawyer in Berlin. He also wrote for various magazines and was a founding member of the Socialist Youth Organisation "The working youth". During this period he belonged to the revisionist wing of the party.

In 1921 he was a co-founder of the Allgemeine Arbeiter-Union – Einheitsorganisation (AAU-E) alongside Otto Rühle, Franz Pfemfert and Oskar Kanehl. Broh was a contributor to Die Aktion:
