= Antinational Socialist Party =

German political party

The Antinational Socialist Party (German: Antinationale Sozialistenpartei) was a political organisation originally clandestinely founded in Berlin in 1915. Following the German Revolution of 9 November 1918, it revealed itself through the pages of Die Aktion.

The Appeal published on 16 November 1918 was signed by Ludwig Bäumer, Albert Ehrenstein, Julius Keller, Karl Otten, Franz Pfemfert, Heinrich Schaefer, Hans Siemsen and Carl Zuckmayer. The party existed until March 1919.
