= Allgemeine Arbeiter-Union – Einheitsorganisation =

Anti-parliamentarian council communist organisation established in Germany

The Allgemeine Arbeiter-Union – Einheitsorganisation (AAUE or AAU-E; English: General Workers' Union – Unified Organization) was an anti-parliamentarian council communist organisation established in Germany in October 1921. It was a split from the General Workers' Union of Germany (AAUD).

== History ==
Otto Rühle was involved in setting up the AAUE as an organisation which combined the political and economic aspirations of communist workers in a single (einheits) organisation. This occurred following his trip to Russia as a representative of the Communist Workers' Party of Germany (KAPD) at the Second World Congress of the Communist International. He travelled around Russia before the Congress and formed a very negative view of the Bolshevik regime. He advocated a very different way to realise a communist revolution which came to be adopted by the AAUE:

"Everyone must become in his consciousness a living bearer of the revolutionary struggle and creative member of the communist build-up. The necessary freedom therefore will however never be won in the coercive system of centralism, the chains of bureaucratic-militaristic control, under the burden of a leader-dictatorship and its inevitable accompaniments: arbitrariness, personality cult, authority, corruption, violence. Therefore transformation of the party-conception into a federative community-conception on the line of councilist ideas. Therefore: supersession of external commitments and compulsion through internal readiness and willingness. Therefore: elevation of communism from the demagogic prattle of the paper cliché to the height of one of the most internally captivating and fulfilling experiences of the whole world."

== Members ==
- Jan Appel
- Gerd Arntz
- James Broh
- Ketty Guttmann
- Iwan Katz
- Oskar Kanehl
- Paul Mattick
- August Merges
- Franz Pfemfert
- Otto Rühle
