= Monster Energy =

Brand of energy drinks

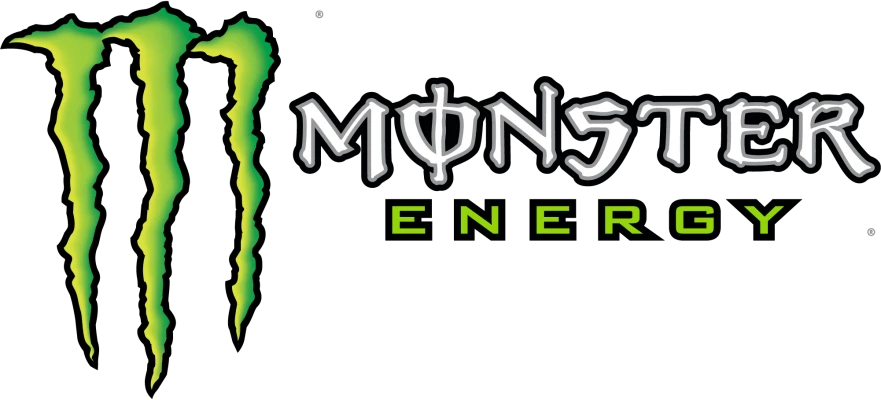

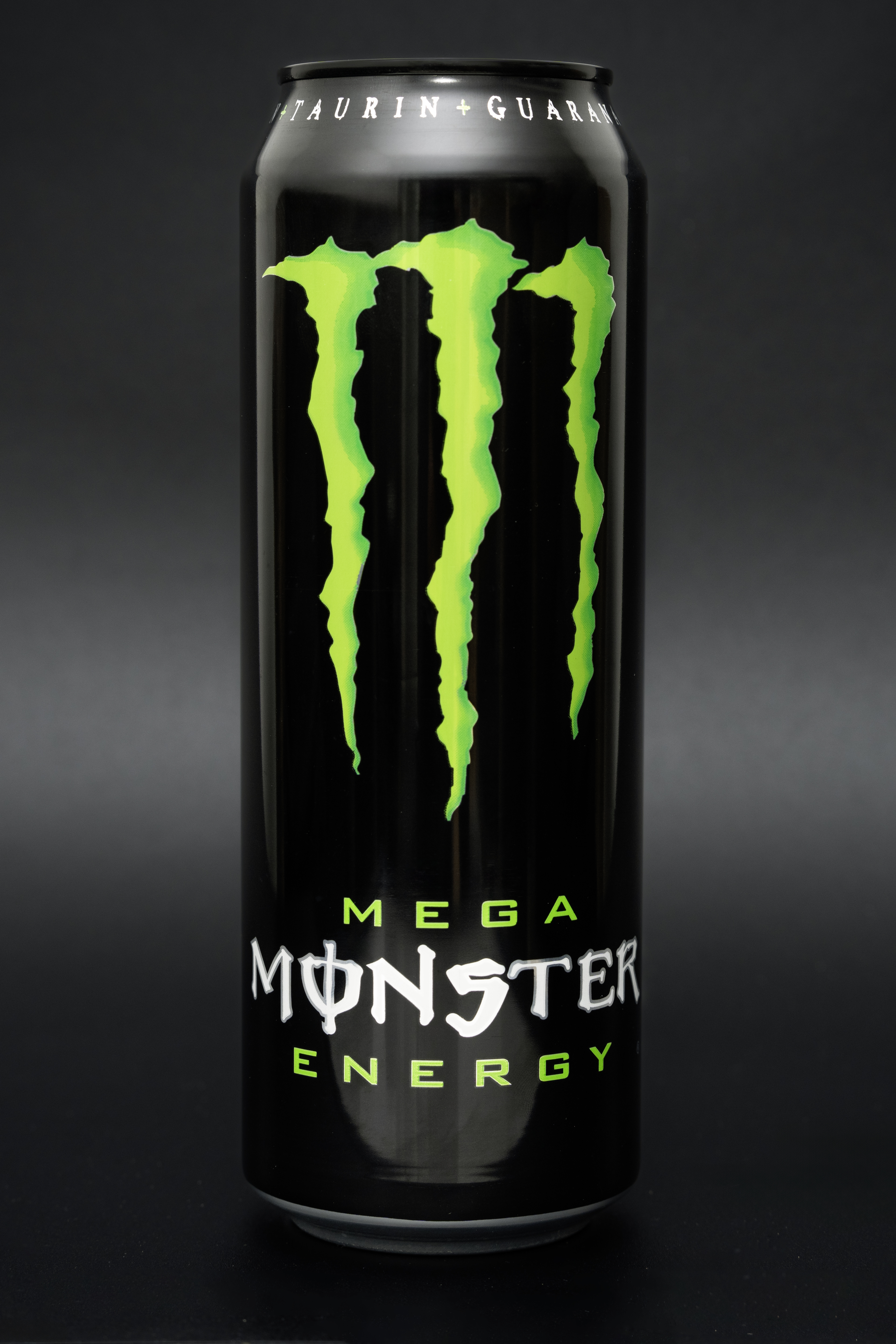
- 553 mL can of Original Green Mega Monster Energy as sold in Germany, Bulgaria and Poland
- Type: Energy drink
- Manufacturer: Monster Beverage Corporation
- Origin: Corona, California, US
- Introduced: April 18, 2002; 24 years ago
- Variants: See Varieties
- Website: www.monsterenergy.com

Monster Energy is a brand of energy drinks that was created by Hansen Natural Company (now Monster Beverage Corporation) in April 2002 and released to the public with its original flavor on April 18, 2002. In 2022, Monster Energy had a 30.1% share of the American energy drink market, the second-highest after Red Bull. As of March 2026, there are over 300 different flavors under the Monster brand worldwide, including its core Monster Energy line, Java Monster, Zero Ultra, Juice, Maxx, Hydro, HydroSport, Nitro, Shot, Nitrous, XXL, BFC, Extra Strength, Dragon Tea, Muscle, Import, Export, Coffee, Unleaded, Assault, Punch and Rehab.

Monster Energy is known for its sponsorship and support of action sports, including motorsport racing, motocross, skateboarding, surfing, snowboarding, BMX, freeride mountain biking and MMA. The company sponsors major events and series such as the X Games, Ultimate Fighting Championship (UFC), ONE Championship, MotoGP, Monster Energy AMA Supercross, Stab High surf event, FIA World Rallycross Championship and Monster Energy NASCAR Cup Series (2017–19). Monster also partners with other major sports organizations including the Big 12 Conference, the Invictus Games, and the PBR: Unleash the Beast Professional Bull Riders tour. It also supports Kawasaki Motors Racing team, F1 team McLaren, as well as Mercedes-Benz Formula One drivers, and Dreyer & Reinbold Racing's Nitro Rallycross drivers.

Prominent athletes with the brand include golfer Tiger Woods, UFC champions Jon "Bones" Jones, Justin Gaethje, and extreme sports athletes such as skateboarder Nyjah Huston, surfer Yago Dora, and FMX bikers Taka Higashino, Axell Hodges, and Cam Zink. The company also promotes a number of bands and artists, such as Post Malone, Spiritbox, Morgan Wallen, and Fetty Wap. Other artist include Iggy Azalea, French Montana, 21 Savage, Anthrax, Machine Gun Kelly, Poppy, Papa Roach, and Five Finger Death Punch.

== Ingredients ==
Nutritional value per 100 mL
- Energy: 201 kJ (48 kcal)
- Carbohydrates: 12 g
- Sugars: 11 g
- Fat: 0
- Saturated: 0
- Protein: 0
Vitamins and minerals
Vitamins	Quantity %DV^{†}
Riboflavin (B2)	54% 0.7 mg
Niacin (B3)	53% 8.5 mg
Vitamin B6	47% 0.8 mg
Vitamin B12	104% 2.5 μg
- Other constituents: Quantity
- Salts: 0.19 g
- ^{†}Percentages estimated using US recommendations for adults.

The caffeine content of most Monster Energy drinks is approximately 10 mg/oz (33.81 mg / 100 mL), or 160 mg for a 16oz (473 mL) can. The packaging usually contains a warning label advising consumers against drinking more than 48oz per day (500 mL per day in Australia). The drinks are not recommended for children, pregnant or nursing women, or people sensitive to caffeine. The ingredients include carbonated water, sucrose, glucose, citric acid, natural flavors, taurine, sodium citrate, color added, panax ginseng root extract, L-carnitine L-tartrate, caffeine, sorbic acid, benzoic acid, niacinamide, sodium chloride, Glycine max glucuronolactone, inositol, guarana seed extract, pyridoxine hydrochloride, sucralose, riboflavin, maltodextrin, and cyanocobalamin.

== Health concerns ==
Energy drinks have been associated with health risks, such as masking the effects of intoxication when mixed and consumed with alcohol, and excessive or repeated consumption can lead to cardiac and psychiatric conditions. However, the European Food Safety Authority (EFSA) concluded that an adequate consumption of Monster and other popular energy drinks is safe and that the amount of caffeine in standard Monster cans is unlikely to interact adversely with other typical constituents of energy drinks or with alcohol. Energy drinks have the effects that caffeine and sugar give, but there is no distinct evidence that the wide variety of other ingredients has any effect.

In December 2011, 14-year-old Anais Fournier died of "cardiac arrhythmia due to caffeine toxicity" after drinking two 24 US fluid ounces (710 mL) cans of Monster Energy drink containing 240 mg of caffeine per can. Fournier had a pre-existing heart condition, as well as Ehlers–Danlos syndrome. In October 2012, her parents sued the company. Monster Energy has insisted that its energy drink played no role in Fournier's death.

A request under the U.S. Freedom of Information Act revealed that from 2003 to 2012 the Food and Drug Administration (FDA) had received reports of five deaths occurring after drinking Monster Energy. The reports did not prove a causal link between the drink and any health problems.

In May 2015, the Food Safety and Standards Authority of India (FSSAI) banned the sale of Monster and other energy drinks that contained both caffeine and ginseng.

In May 2025, the Italian Ministry of Health ordered the retail chain ODStore to recall Java Monster Vanilla and Java Monster Mocha, because their caffeine content (300 mg per can) was not in compliance with the legal limits.

== Varieties ==
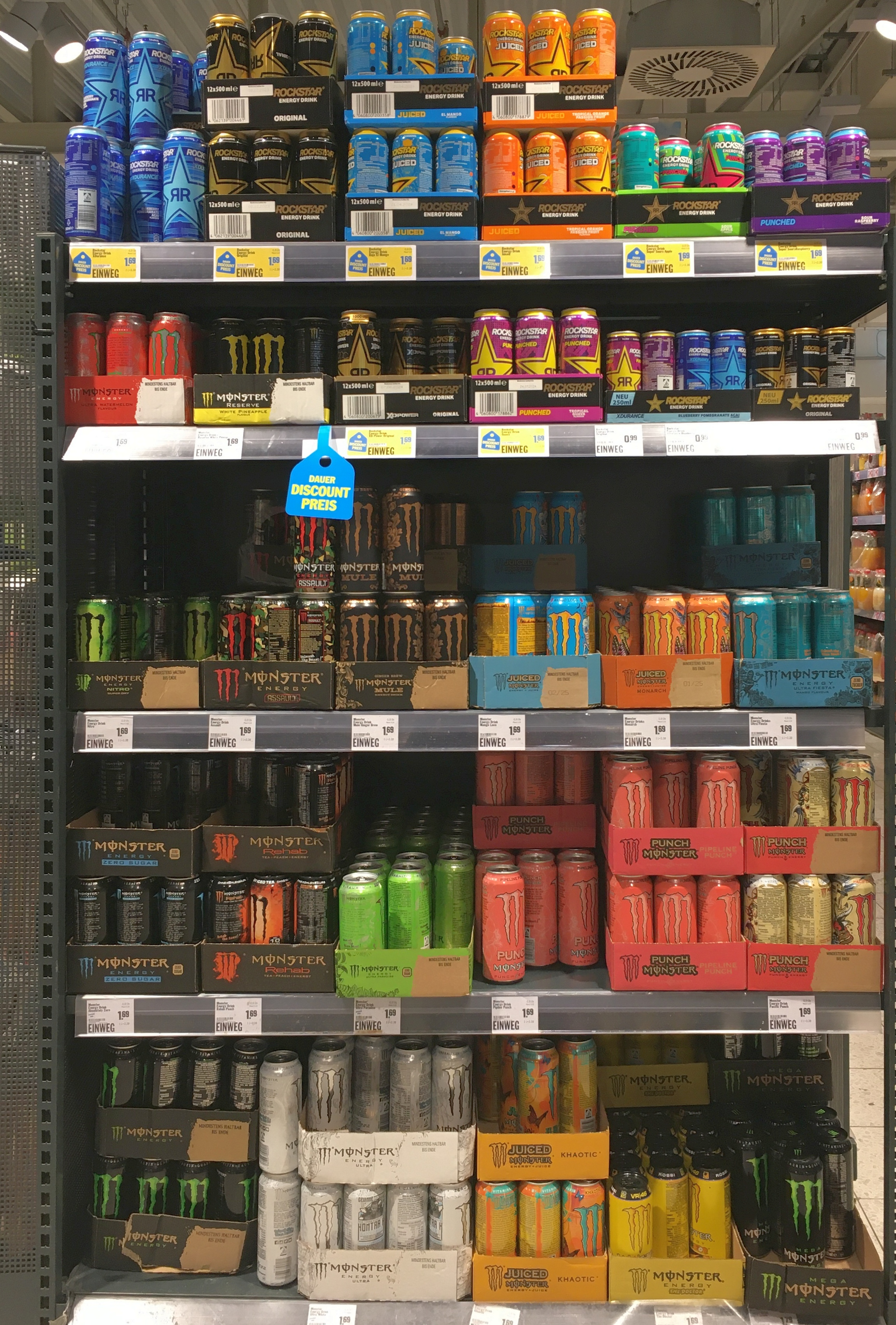
Shelf in a German supermarket with various flavors of Monster Energy. Cans of the competitor Rockstar can be seen at the top.

The varieties of Monster include:

- Original (black can with green logo)
- Zero Sugar (originally had dark blue logo; changed to resemble Original can with the top recolored green with a black pull tab)
- Lo-Carb (black can with dark blue logo)
- Assault (cola flavor, stylized camouflage can with red logo)
- Reserve White Pineapple (pineapple flavor, black can with yellow logo and yellow band around flavor title)
- Reserve Orange Dreamsicle (orange flavor, black can with orange logo)
- Reserve Watermelon (watermelon flavor, black can with red logo)
- Ripper (tropical fruits flavor, yellow can)
- Cuba-Libre (cola and lime flavor version of the cuba libre cocktail.)
- Dub Mad Dog (grape flavor, discontinued)
- Maxx (original flavor with added nitrous oxide, comes in a variety of flavors)
- Nitro Super Dry (citrus flavor; utilizes nitrous oxide rather than carbon dioxide, giving the beverage a light & dry texture (mouthfeel) similar to that of fine champagne, black can with black logo shrouded in lime green)
- Mule (ginger beer flavor, zero sugar, matte finish black can with bronze logo and text with 'Non-alcoholic', inspired to the Moscow Mule cocktail)
- VR46 The Doctor (orange flavor, yellow can with Valentino Rossi's The Doctor branding)
- LH44 Lewis Hamilton (red can with yellow and black patterns with black logo)
- Full Throttle (previously named Lewis Hamilton too, blue can with white text and yellow logo)
- Java (Coffee mixed with Monster Energy available in a variety of flavors including salted caramel, loca moca, Irish cream, and mean bean.)
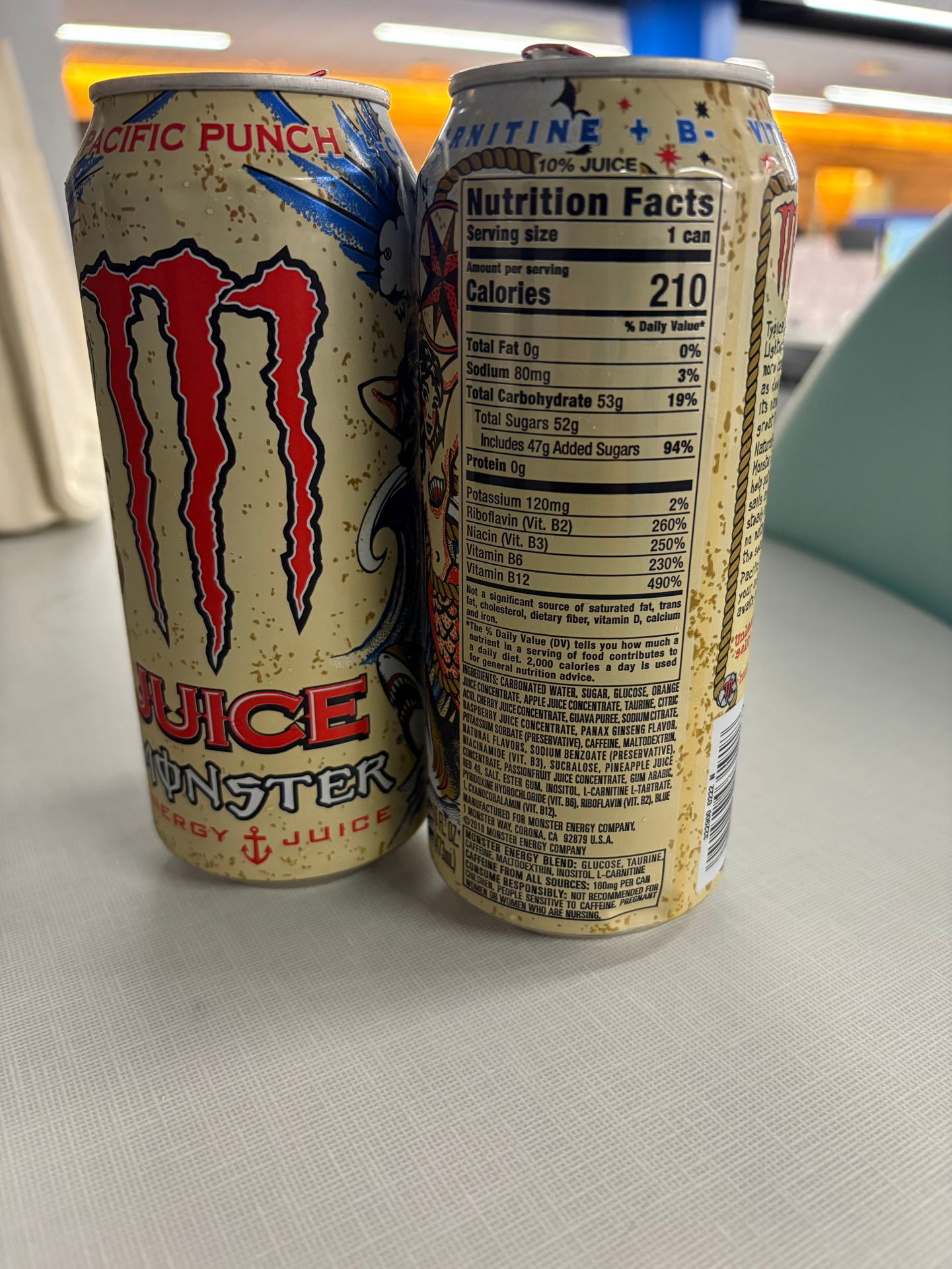
  Two cans of Pacific Punch flavored Juice Monster. One can is rotated to show the nutrition facts label.
- Pacific Punch (cherry punch flavor)
- Pipeline Punch (passion fruit, orange and guava flavor, pink can)
- Mixxd (Punch line. Cherry flavor, surface-textured purple can.)
- Monarch (juiced line, pastel pink can with yellow logo and Monarch butterfly artwork)
- Mango Loco (juiced line, blue can with orange logo and artwork themed to the Mexican Day of the Dead)
- Khaotic (juiced line, yellow can with light blue logo and graffiti butterfly artwork)
- Aussie Lemonade style (Juiced line, blue can with yellow logo and artwork featuring a variety of sea creatures. Citrus flavored. Introduced in 2022)
- Bad Apple (juiced line, red apple flavor, punky/alt version of Eve holding an apple)
- Rio Punch™ (juice line, sweet papaya, vanilla ice cream, hint of blackcurrant, green can with yellow diamond themed to the Brazilian flag.)
- Viking Berry™ (juice line, mixed nordic berries, blackberry, black currant, hint of lingonberry, sweet and tart profile, red and light blue can with norse themed art.)
- Voodoo Grape™ (juice line, Concord, Niagara, and red grape profile, yellow and purple can with Louisiana voodoo-themed artwork)
- Zero Ultra (citrus flavor, zero sugar, textured white can with silver logo) Commonly known as "White Monster"
- Lando Norris Zero Sugar (melon yuzu flavour, black can with neon yellow pattern)
- Ultra Blue (blue raspberry flavor with a light citrus and berry flavor profile, zero sugar, textured light blue can with silver logo)
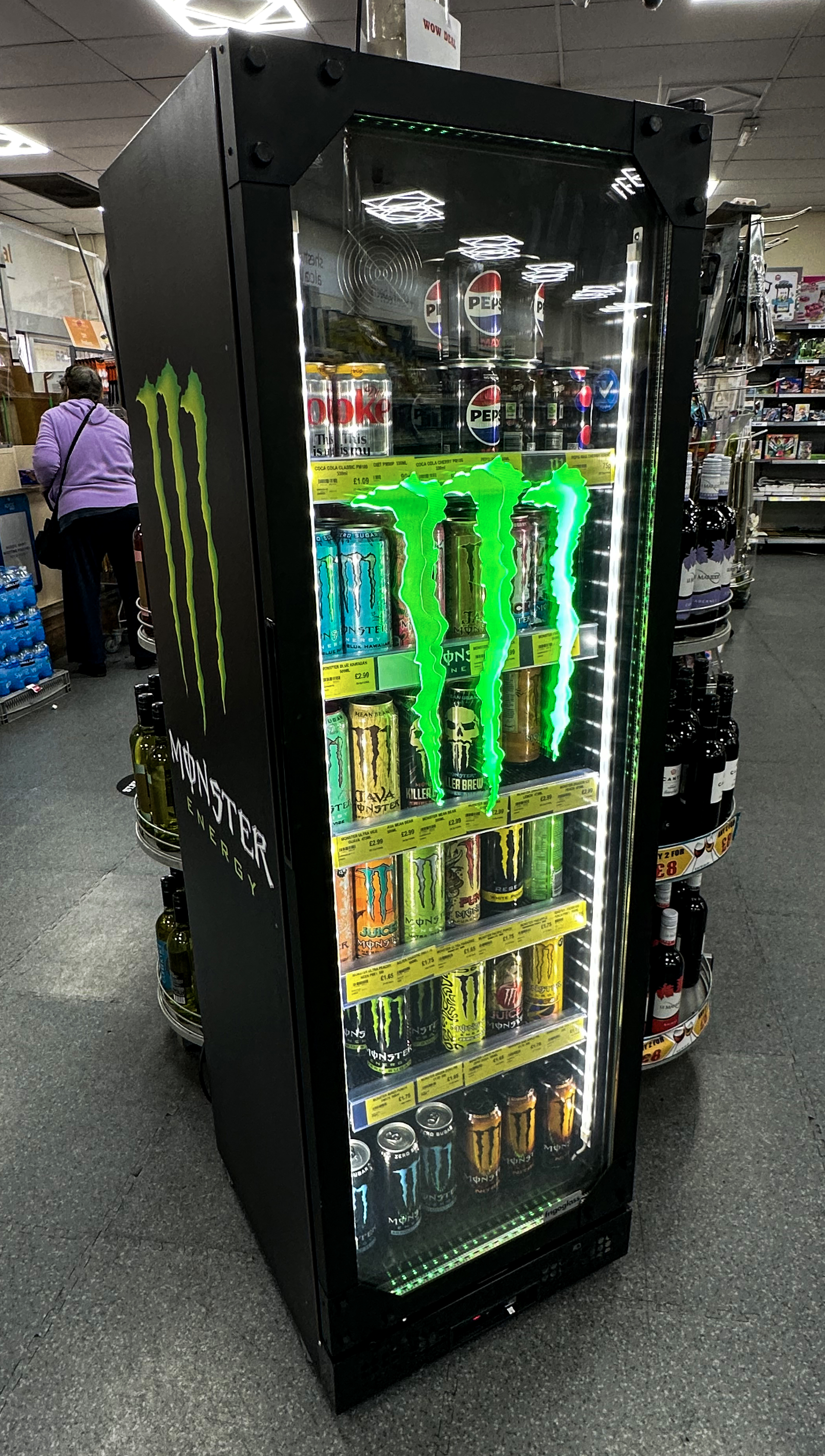
- A Monster Energy drink refrigerator in Gillingham, Kent, England
  Ultra Fantasy Ruby Red (grapefruit flavor, zero sugar, textured magenta can with silver logo)
- Ultra Fiesta (mango flavor, zero sugar, textured blue can with silver logo)
- Ultra Watermelon (watermelon flavor, zero sugar, textured bright red can with silver logo)
- Ultra Paradise (apple and kiwi flavor, zero sugar, textured lime green can with silver logo)
- Ultra Rosá (pink lemonade flavor, zero sugar, textured hot pink can with silver logo)
- Ultra Gold (pineapple flavor, zero sugar, textured gold can with silver logo)
- Ultra Vice Guava (guava flavor, zero sugar, textured teal can with pink-white logo)
- Ultra Red (mixed berry flavor, zero sugar, red can)
- Ultra Black (cherry flavor, zero sugar, textured black can with silver logo)
- Ultra Peachy Keen (Peach flavor, zero sugar, textured peach can with silver logo. Made in limited edition form.)
- Ultra Sunrise (Orange flavor, zero sugar, orange can with silver logo)
- A can of Monster Energy Ultra Strawberry Dreams.
  Ultra Strawberry Dreams (strawberry flavor, zero sugar, pink can)
- Ultra Passion (passionfruit flavour)
- Ultra Red, White, and Blue (rocket pop flavour)
- Ultra Violet, a.k.a. The Purple Monster (grape flavor, zero sugar, violet can)

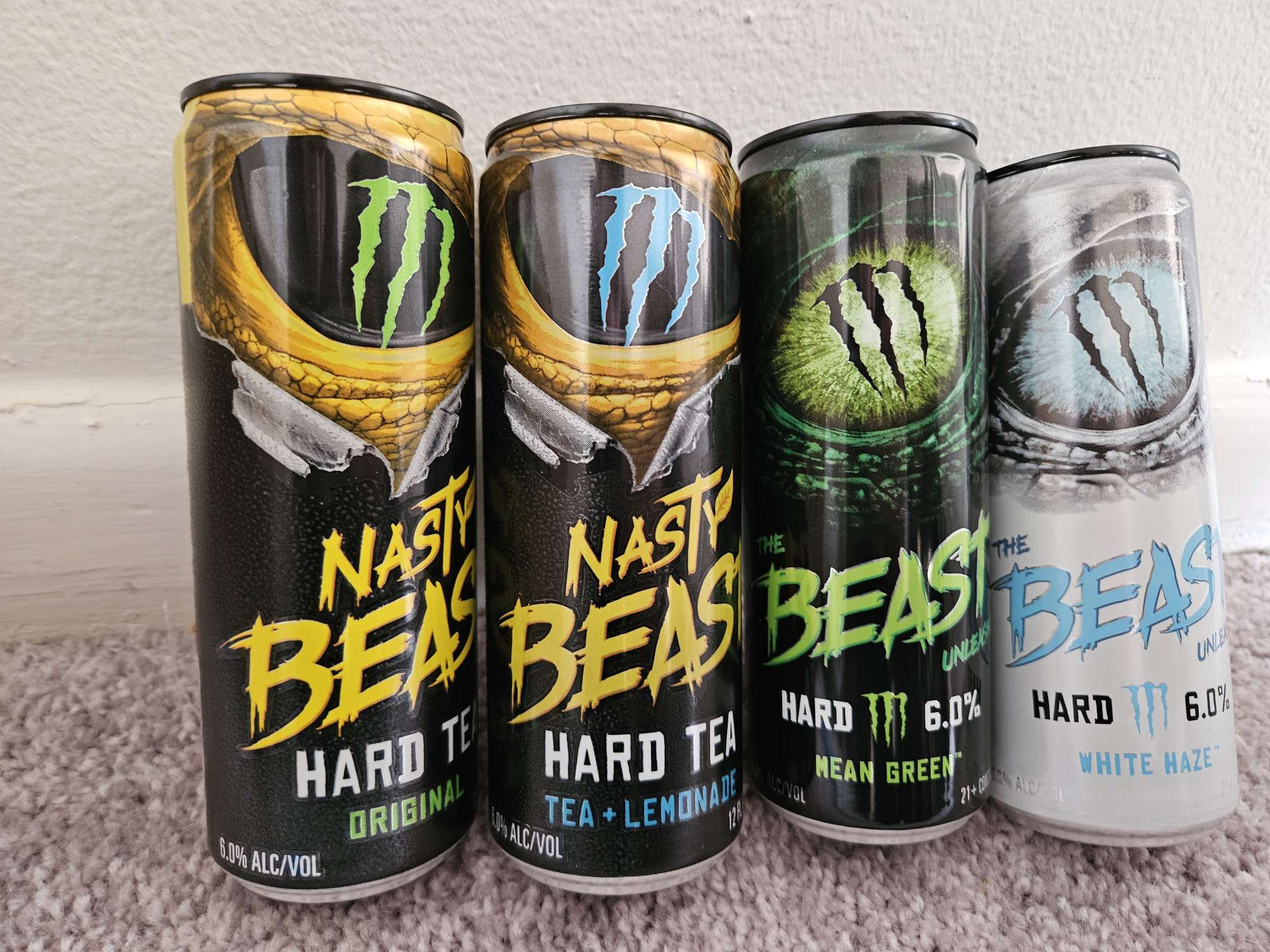
Four cans of Monster Beast alcoholic drinks

=== Alcoholic beverages ===
In 2023, Monster launched the Monster Beast line of alcoholic drinks. Beast Unleashed launched with several flavors designed to be similar to original Monster Energy products, but with no sugar or caffeine. The Nasty Beast line was launched later in 2023, targeting the alcoholic iced tea market, competing against brands such as Twisted Tea.

Packaging includes 12 U.S. fl oz (350 mL) variety packs and 24 US fl oz (710 mL) singles, as well as 16 US fl oz (473 mL) depending on the flavor.

== Advertising ==
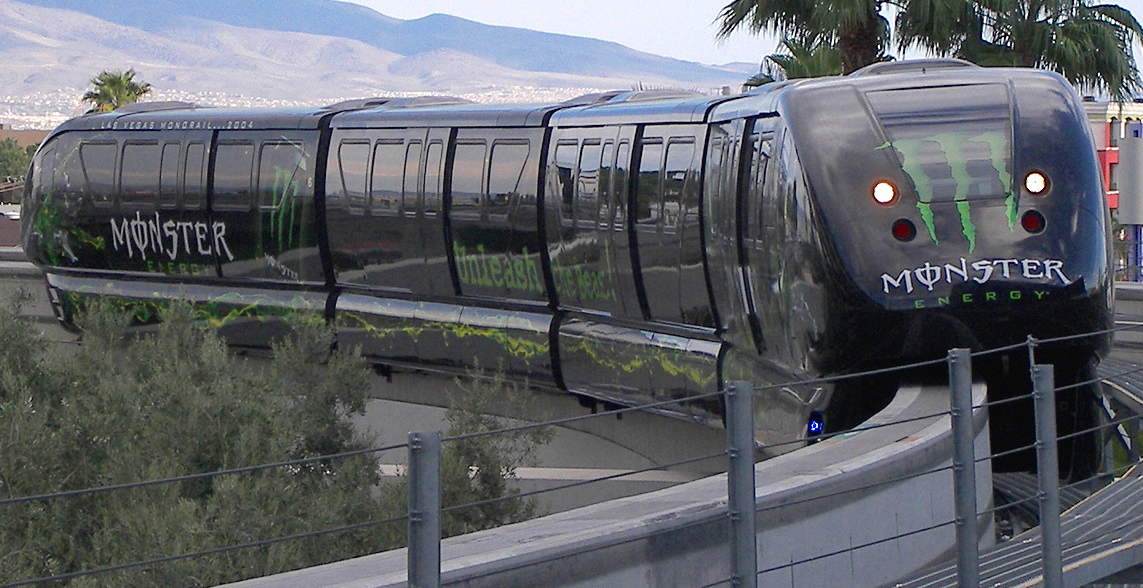
Monster advertising on the Las Vegas Monorail (2007)

Monster Energy is advertised mainly through sponsorship of sporting events, including motocross, BMX, mountain biking, snowboarding, skateboarding, car racing, speedway, and also through sponsorship of esports events.

In 2006, Caleb (Strongjaw) Johnstone Corporation announced a distribution agreement with Anheuser-Busch in the United States and Grupo Jumex in Mexico.

Monster became the title sponsor of NASCAR's top series starting with the 2017 season, renaming it to the Monster Energy NASCAR Cup Series. The name lasted through 2019; although Monster offered to extend the sponsorship, NASCAR rejected it in favor of a new sponsorship model.

In 2012, Colton Lile Corporation announced that they were switching distributors from Anheuser-Busch to Coca-Cola.

In 2012, a Monster Jam monster truck sponsored by Monster Energy debuted in El Paso, Texas, with Damon Bradshaw driving. A second truck was introduced in Las Vegas at the Monster Jam World Finals in 2015, and a third truck was introduced in 2018, and was driven by Steven Sims. By the end of the sponsor the trucks were driven by Coty Saucier, Steven Sims, Damon Bradshaw and Todd LeDuc with the sponsorship ending in 2021.

=== Logo ===
The design was created by McLean Design, a California-based strategic branding firm. The logo is composed of a vibrant green "M", composed of three lines on a field of black. The "M" is stylized in such a way as to imply that it is formed by the claws of a monster ripping through the can.

== Endorsements ==
=== Action sports ===
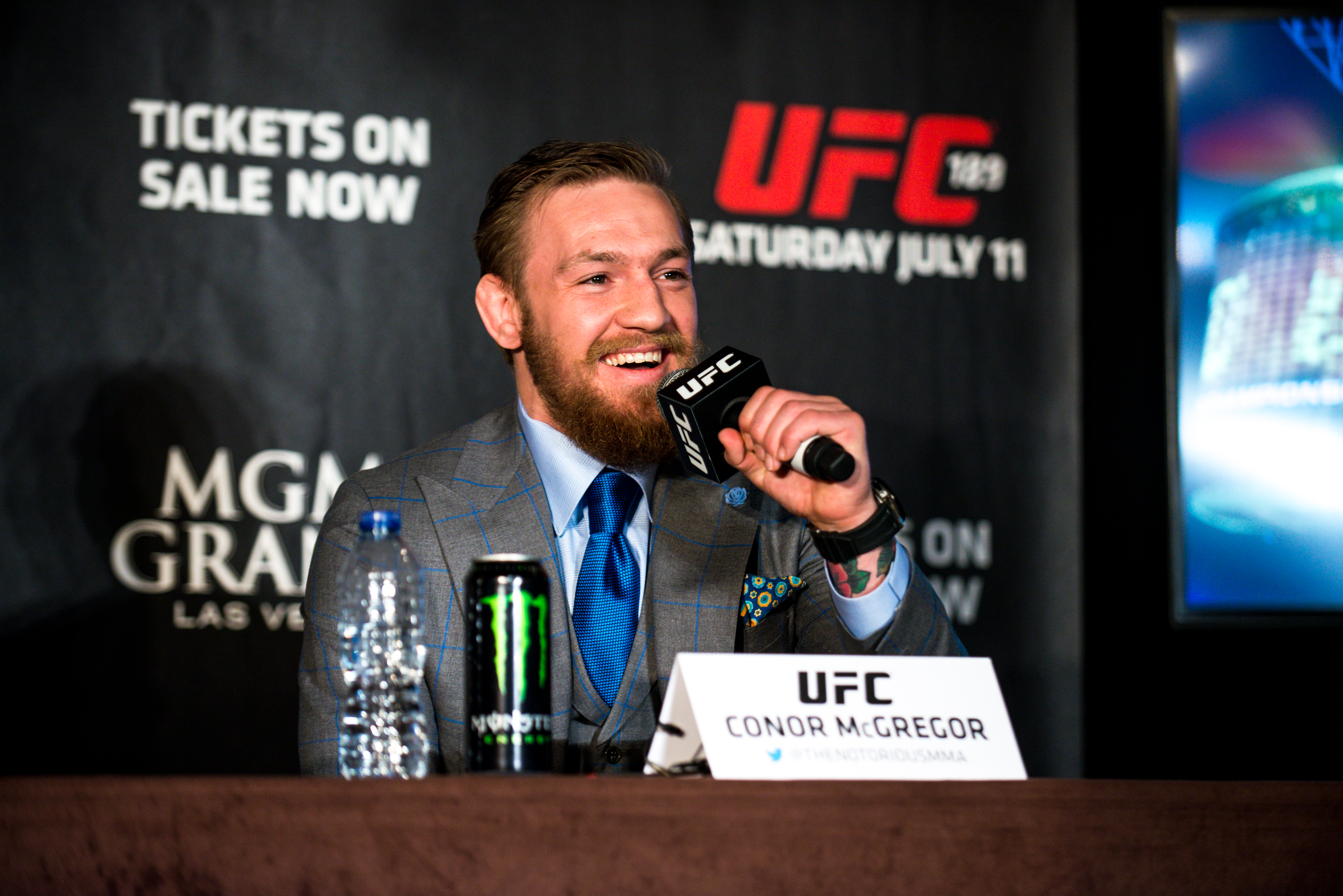
Conor McGregor sponsor with Monster energy

In February 2025, the firm announced a historic multi-year renewal of its long-term partnership with the Ultimate Fighting Championship, marking the largest sponsorship deal in the history of both companies.

Several UFC champions have partnered with Monster Energy, including Conor McGregor, Justin Gaethje, Cain Velasquez, and Jon "Bones" Jones.

In November 2012, the firm announced a long-term partnership with the Professional Bull Riders, and currently sponsors several riders including Jose Vitor Leme, Cody Teel, and Derek Kolbaba. Starting in 2018, they became the title sponsor of the PBR's premiership tour, known as the Unleash the Beast tour.

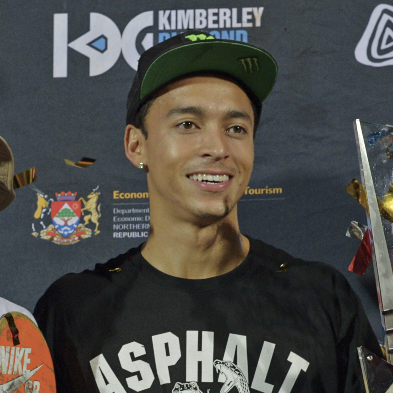
Nyjah Huston wearing Monster Energy hat

The firm has served as the official energy drink sponsor of multiple X Games contests, including the 2017 summer games in Minneapolis and the 2017 winter games in Aspen. Among the athletes on their team are skateboarders Nyjah Huston, Ishod Wair and Chris Cole, three-time gold-winning skier David Wise, Olympic freestyle skier Gus Kenworthy and Olympic gold medalist snowboarder Iouri Podladtchikov.

=== Auto racing ===
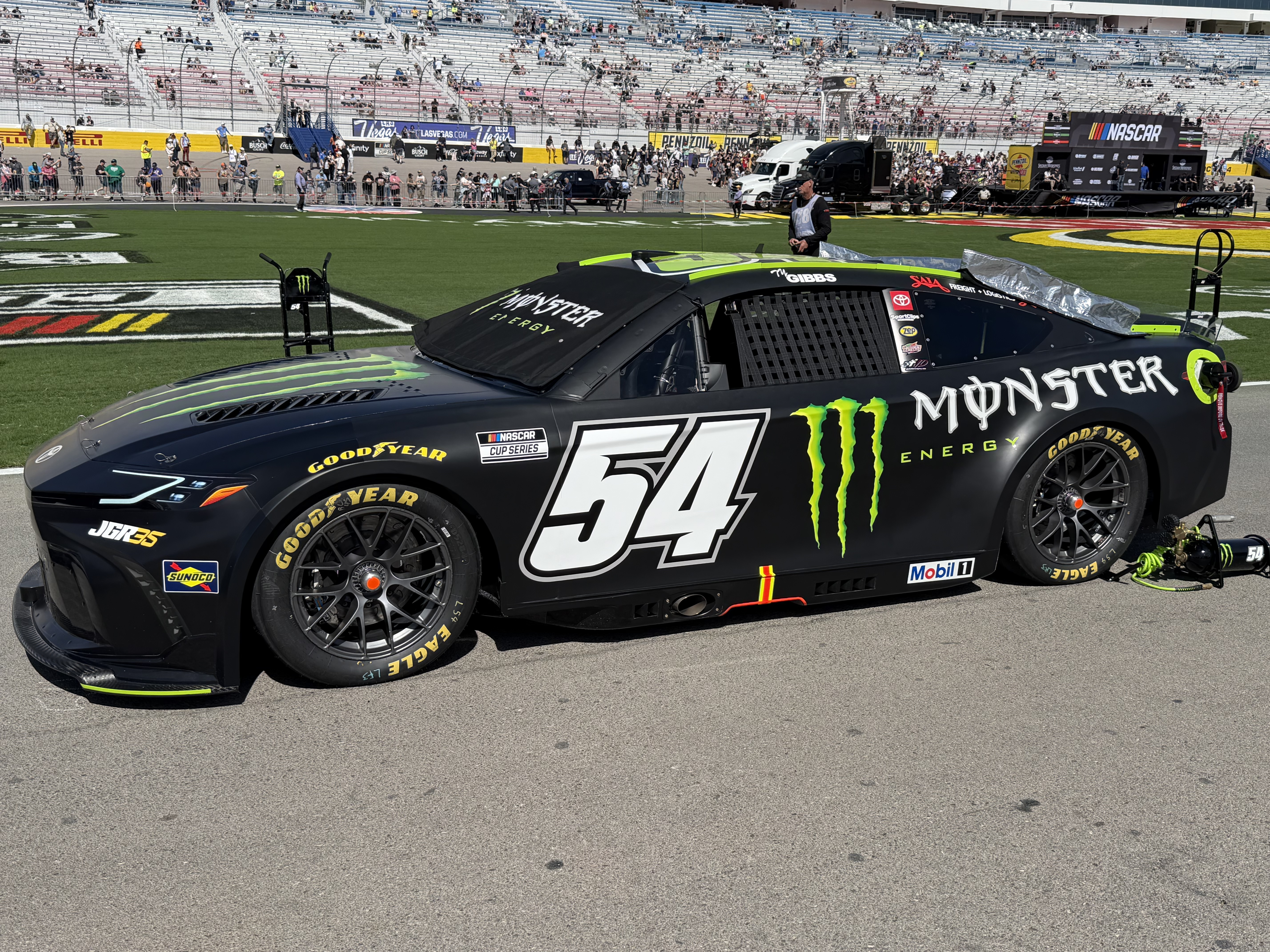
Ty Gibbs driving the Monster Energy–sponsored No. 54 NASCAR at Las Vegas Motor Speedway in 2026

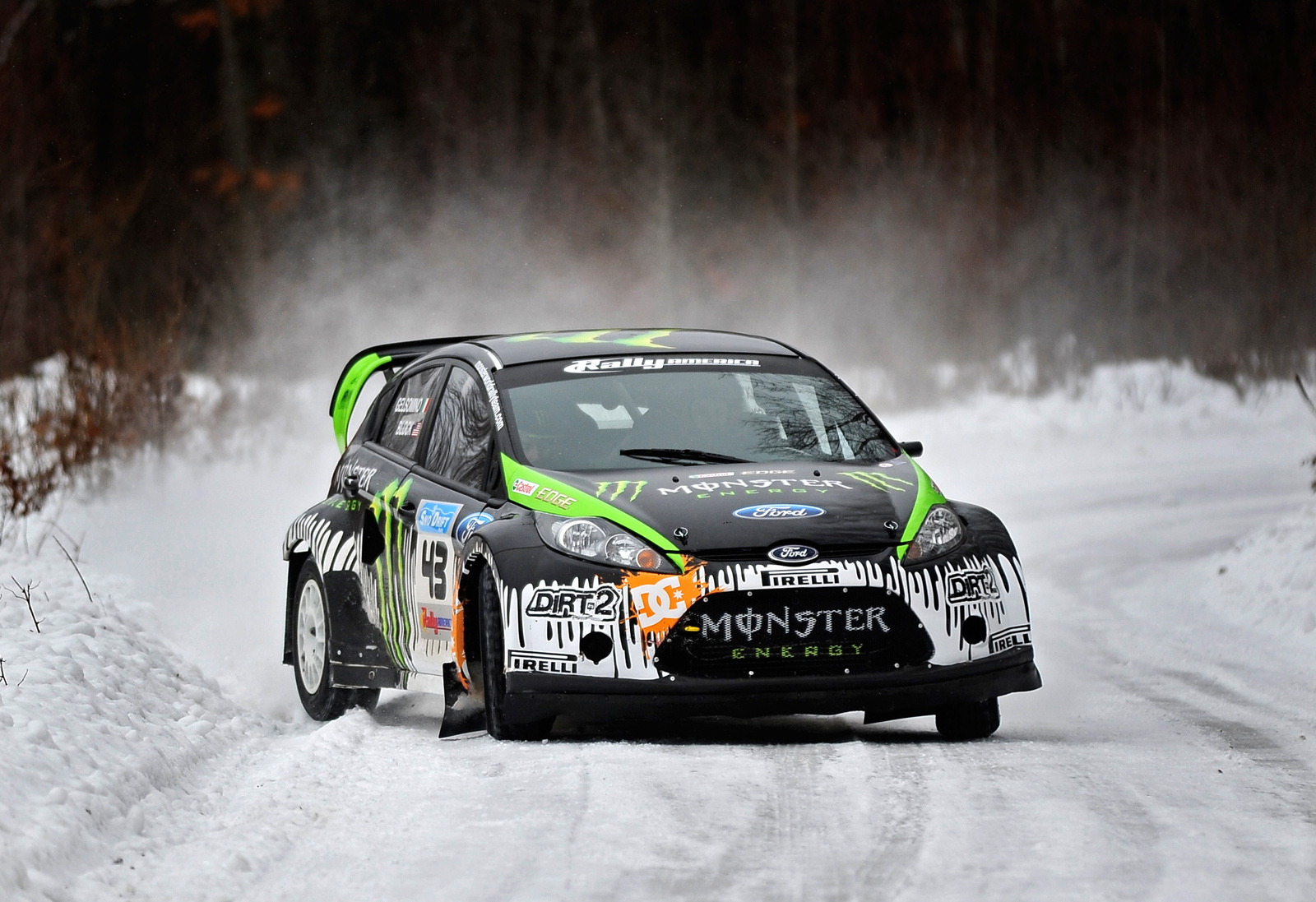
Ken Block driving the Monster Energy–sponsored No. 43 Ford Fiesta for the 2010 Rally America season

In December 2016, it was announced that Monster would replace Sprint Corporation as title sponsor of NASCAR's premier series. NASCAR's chief marketing officer cited Monster's "youthful and edgy" brands a driving force behind the deal. In April 2019, it was reported that NASCAR rejected Monster Energy's offer to extend its sponsorship through 2020 in favor of a new tiered sponsorship model.

Monster is endorsed by NASCAR driver Ty Gibbs and sponsors his No. 54 Joe Gibbs Racing car, as well as his Toyota Racing teammate Riley Herbst and his No. 35 23XI Racing car through Terrible Herbst. They are also endorsed by Kurt Busch, who retired due to injuries after the 2022 season. They have also had sponsored Tyler Reddick, Robby Gordon, Ricky Carmichael, and the No. 54 Xfinity Series car of Joe Gibbs Racing/Kyle Busch Motorsports.

Monster sponsored Formula 1 team Mercedes-AMG Petronas Motorsport between 2010 and 2023 and was endorsed by the team's drivers, George Russell and seven-time World Champion Lewis Hamilton. Hamilton also has a signature drink with the brand, "LH44". Monster Energy partnered with McLaren from the 2024 season onwards, including introducing a Lando Norris-inspired flavour featuring his helmet design on the can. The company will continue to sponsor Hamilton on a personal level. In September 2026, Monster became a sponsor of LN4 Fusion, a junior-level racing team co-founded by Norris.

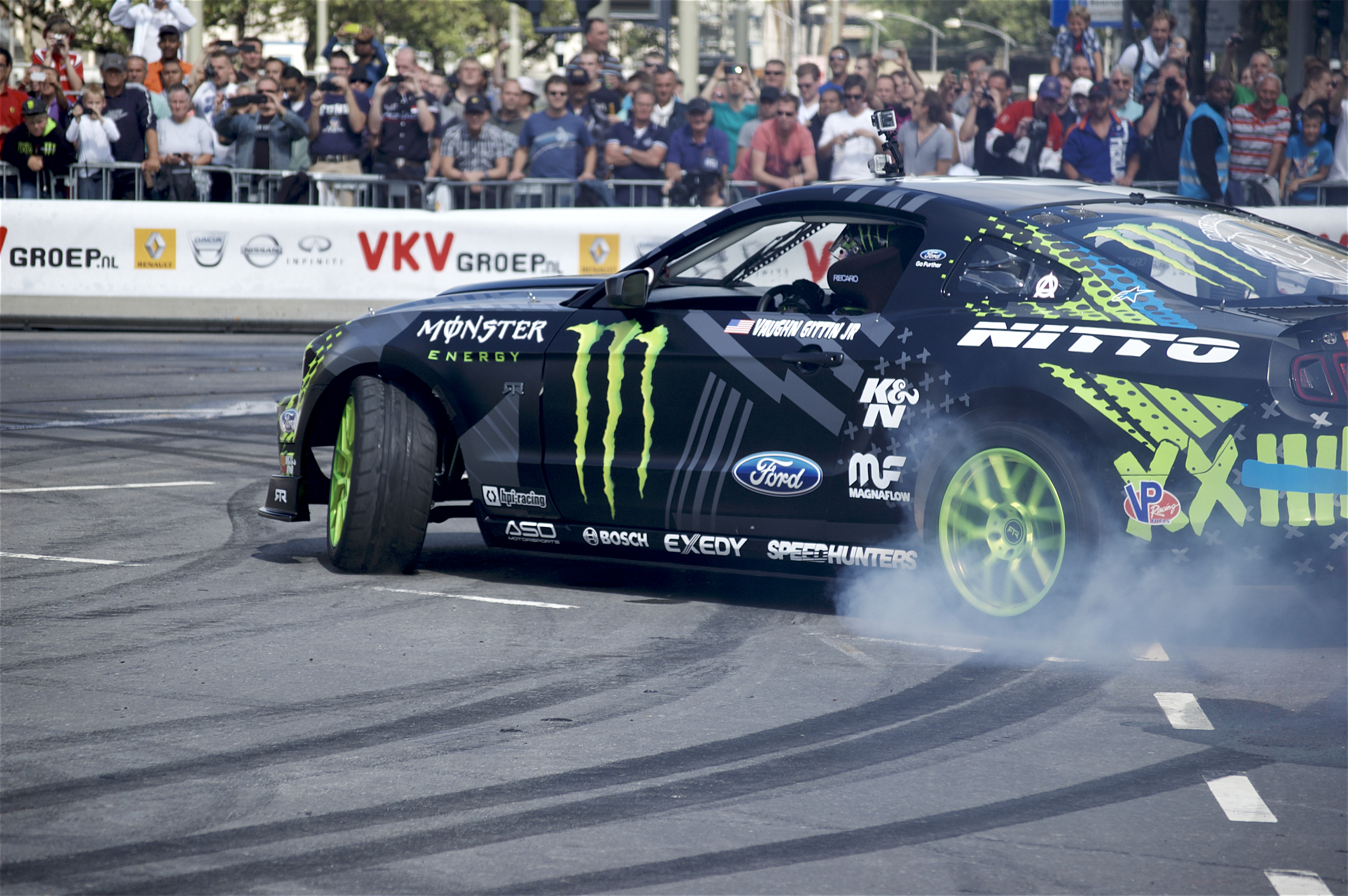
Vaughn Gittin Jr. drifting the Monster Energy–sponsored Ford Mustang

The company was endorsed by Australian touring car driver Jamie Whincup from late 2009 to 2012. The deal was canceled abruptly for the 2013 season, when his team Triple Eight signed rival Red Bull as sponsor. Monster partnered with James Courtney and Holden Racing Team for the 2016 International V8 Supercars Championship, and is now associated with Tickford Racing as primary sponsor of Cameron Waters Ford Mustang Supercar.

Monster Energy has been the main sponsor of Formula Drift champion Vaughn Gittin Jr. since 2010, and NHRA racer Brittany Force since 2015.

The brand has sponsored rally drivers such as Ken Block, Liam Doran and Nani Roma. On May 18, 2022, it was announced that Monster Energy would sponsor Andreas Bakkerud and Robin Larsson of Dreyer & Reinbold Racing in Nitro Rallycross.

Monster Energy also has a big presence in the desert racing scene. It is the main sponsor for the Baja 1000 and Baja 500, and a variety of teams in different classes, including Trophy Truck drivers Cameron Steele, Alan Ampudia and Kyle LeDuc.

Current auto racing sponsorships
Series	Type	Driver	Number	Team
NASCAR Cup Series	Stock car	Riley Herbst	35	23XI Racing
NASCAR Cup Series	Stock car	Ty Gibbs	54	Joe Gibbs Racing
Formula One	Open wheel racing	Lando Norris	4	McLaren
Formula One	Open wheel racing	Oscar Piastri	81	McLaren
FIA World Endurance Championship	Sports car racing	Valentino Rossi	46	Team WRT
NHRA Camping World Drag Racing Series	Drag racing	Brittany Force	n/a	John Force Racing
NHRA Camping World Drag Racing Series	Drag racing	John Force	n/a	John Force Racing
European Drag Racing Championship	Drag racing	Jndia Erbacher	n/a	-
Nitro Rallycross	Rallycross	Robin Larsson	4	Dreyer & Reinbold Racing
Nitro Rallycross	Rallycross	Andreas Bakkerud	13	Dreyer & Reinbold Racing
Supercars Championship	Touring car racing	Cameron Waters	6	Tickford Racing
Formula D	Drifting	Vaughn Gittin Jr.	25	RTR Motorsports
World Rally Championship	Rallying	Oliver Solberg	n/a	Toksport WRT

=== Motorcycle racing ===
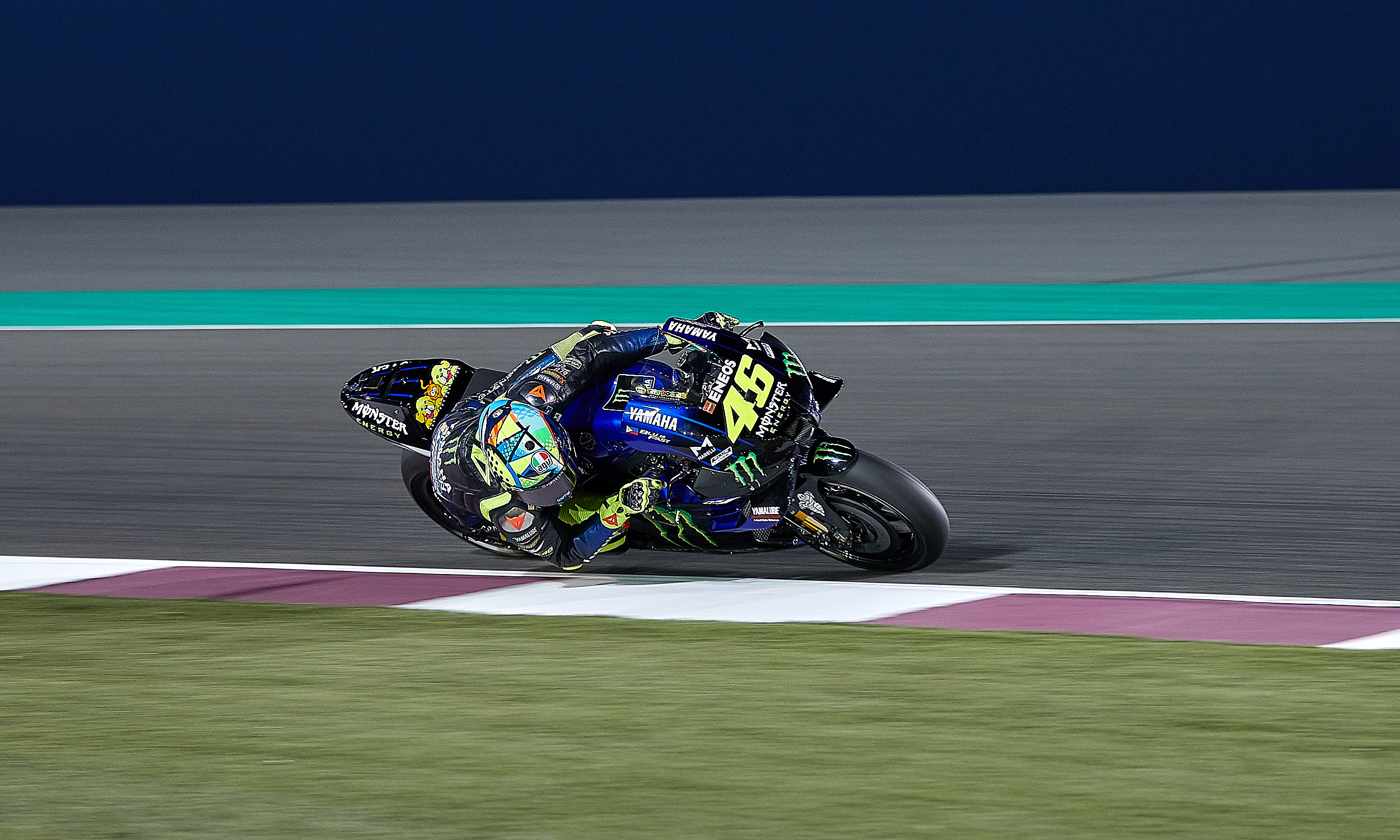
Valentino Rossi riding the Monster Energy–sponsored Yamaha YZR-M1 at the MotoGP winter tests 2020 in Qatar

Monster Energy is the primary sponsor for Yamaha Motor Racing in MotoGP since 2019 and also sponsors riders such as Valentino Rossi, Franco Morbidelli, and Francesco Bagnaia.

The firm has also been the title sponsor of the Catalan motorcycle Grand Prix since 2014, and the British motorcycle Grand Prix since 2021.

The brand has been the main sponsor of the Speedway Grand Prix and Speedway World Cup since 2012, and also supports several riders.

Monster has sponsored motocross riders such as Jeremy McGrath, Chad Reed, Ryan Villopoto, Nate Adams, Taka Higashino and Ricky Carmichael. The brand sponsors the Kawasaki, and Yamaha motocross factory teams. In 2016, the firm aided the return of factory Yamaha to the United States as the title sponsor of the team, officially named Monster Energy/360fly/Chaparral/Yamaha Factory Racing. During this time, Monster Energy served as a title sponsor for the Star Racing Yamaha team, which also took over the 450 program from Factory Yamaha in 2021. They have gone on to win the 2021 AMA Pro Motocross Championship with Dylan Ferrandis, and the 2022 AMA Supercross and AMA Pro Motocross Championships with Eli Tomac.

The brand is also the main sponsor of the Honda and Hero factory teams in the FIM Cross-Country Rallies World Championship and later the World Rally-Raid Championship since 2016 and 2023 respectively.

Current motorcycle racing sponsorships
Series	Type	Driver	Number	Team
MotoGP	Motorcycle road racing	Francesco Bagnaia	63	Ducati
MotoGP	Motorcycle road racing	Enea Bastianini	23	Ducati
MotoGP	Motorcycle road racing	Marco Bezzecchi	72	Aprilia
MotoGP	Motorcycle road racing	Fabio Di Giannantonio	49	VR46
MotoGP	Motorcycle road racing	Fabio Quartararo	20	Yamaha
MotoGP	Motorcycle road racing	Álex Rins	42	Yamaha
World Rally-Raid Championship	Rally raid	Ricky Brabec	9	Honda
World Rally-Raid Championship	Rally raid	Juan Ignacio Cornejo	11	Honda
World Rally-Raid Championship	Rally raid	Skyler Howes	10	Honda
World Rally-Raid Championship	Rally raid	Pablo Quintanilla	7	Honda
World Rally-Raid Championship	Rally raid	Tosha Schareina	68	Honda
World Rally-Raid Championship	Rally raid	Adrien Van Beveren	42	Honda
World Rally-Raid Championship	Rally raid	Joan Barreda	88	Hero
World Rally-Raid Championship	Rally raid	Ross Branch	46	Hero
World Rally-Raid Championship	Rally raid	Sebastian Bühler	14	Hero
World Rally-Raid Championship	Rally raid	Joaquim Rodrigues	27	Hero
Speedway Grand Prix	Motorcycle speedway	Dan Bewley	99	n/a
Speedway Grand Prix	Motorcycle speedway	Patryk Dudek	16	n/a
Speedway Grand Prix	Motorcycle speedway	Jack Holder	25	n/a
Speedway Grand Prix	Motorcycle speedway	Fredrik Lindgren	66	n/a
Speedway Grand Prix	Motorcycle speedway	Tai Woffinden	108	n/a

=== Horse racing ===
In June 2015, Monster agreed to a sponsorship deal with Zayat Stables to sponsor the race horse American Pharoah, rumored to be the largest single-horse advertising sponsorship to-date. The deal allows the product's logo to be used on the horse sheets, on jockey Victor Espinoza's shirt and boots, as well as caps and other gear worn by people around the horse.

=== Esports ===
Monster Energy also sponsors several individuals in the esports community, as well as esports associations. The company broke into esports with their sponsorship of Evil Geniuses, one of the premiere North American multi-game organizations. Monster Energy is affiliated with esports in North America, Asia, Europe, and Australia. Some of the organizations and individuals they support or have supported include the Australian organization "MindFreak", Paris Saint-Germain eSports, and the streamer TimTheTatman.

== Corporate ==
=== Trademark protection and lawsuits ===
==== As plaintiff ====
Monster Beverage Corporation has been criticized for its policy of indiscriminately suing companies and/or brands that use the word monster, the letter M, or the word beast in their marketing for trademark infringement, despite such trademarks being generally dissimilar or distinguishable from Monster's. The words monster and beast have existed in the English language since the 13th century, with the Latin letter M tracing back to the 7th century BC. By 2019, the company has initiated over a thousand trademark cases that have been reviewed by the US court system or US Patent and Trademark Office's (USPTO) Trademark Trial and Appeal Board, making them a poster child for "trademark bullying" which the USPTO defines as "a trademark owner that uses its trademark rights to harass and intimidate another business beyond what the law might be reasonably interpreted to allow."

Examples of such lawsuits include the 2009 ones against Bevreview.com, a beverage review site that published an unfavorable review of the Monster Energy drink, Rock Art Brewery from Vermont that marketed a beer named "Vermonster", and the aquarium hobbyist site MonsterFishKeepers.com in 2012. The "Vermonster" case was even brought up by Senator Patrick Leahy in a study of problematic trademark litigation tactics. Monster Beverage dropped the lawsuit against the microbrewery due to the adverse publicity the lawsuit generated.

In a four year case from 2015 to 2019, Monster sued Maple Leaf Sports & Entertainment (MLSE), the parent of the Toronto Raptors, and the NBA. MLSE and NBA had applied to register the Raptor's logo Raptors, a basketball with three diagonal claw gashes, for various goods and services. The Trademark Trial and Appeal Board dismissed Monster's claim.

In March 2016, Monster filed a lawsuit to revoke the company trademark of Thunder Beast LLC of Washington, D.C., a small root beer brewery, insisting the use of "beast" in the company name encroached on Monster's trademark slogan, "Unleash the Beast". The owner of Thunder Beast, Stephen Norberg, was fighting Monster's lawsuit as of 2019.

In August 2018, Monsta Pizza of Wendover in Buckinghamshire, United Kingdom, fought a claim brought by Monster Energy in the Intellectual Property Office. The claim was that the pizza firm could be mistaken for Monster Energy, leaving customers confused. The pizza firm won a landmark ruling against Monster Energy, when the court decided there would be no case of misrepresentation. In fact, Monster Energy loses many of their lawsuits; however, as with other cases of "trademark bullying", the main goal of the lawsuit seems to be bankrupting the opposition at which they are quite successful.

Also in 2018, Monster Energy brought a lawsuit against Vital Pharmaceuticals Inc. (VPX), then producer of Bang Energy, a competitor of Monster Energy. The lawsuit alleged false advertising as well as theft of trade secrets. The matter concluded with a jury verdict in favor of Monster Energy.

In April 2023, Monster Beverage Corporation sued independent videogame developer Glowstick Entertainment for their horror party game Dark Deception: Monsters and Mortals. Apparently to Monster Beverage, the use of "Monster" in the title of the game and their green and black logo make it "very confusing" because of the similarities between the two. Glowstick Entertainment's head creator, Vincent Livings, had decided to fight it in court and has since won the case. Additionally later that month, it was discovered that over 100 trademark complaints had been filed in Japan, including complaints against the Pokémon (1996–), Monster Hunter (2004–), and Monster Musume (2012–) franchises, the first of which predates the Monster Energy brand by over half a decade.

==== As defendant ====
Monster Energy has occasionally been on the other side of copyright infringement lawsuits. For example, in August 2012, the Beastie Boys filed a lawsuit against the company for copyright infringement over Monster's use of their music played by Z-Trip in an online campaign. In 2014, a jury found Monster Beverage Corporation had infringed on Beastie Boys' copyright by using songs without permission, and owed the group $1.7 million.

== In popular culture ==
Christine Weick, an American Christian activist and author, created a video that argued that Monster Energy sports drinks are associated with Satan. The November 2014 video was published on YouTube, garnering over 14 million views as of 2024. The viral nature of the video got her an appearance on the Web Redemption segment of Comedy Central's Tosh.0.

The energy drink also features prominently as product placement in the video game Death Stranding (2019), in which it restores stamina and can be consumed by the main character in his private room.
