= Die Aktion =

Political and cultural journal

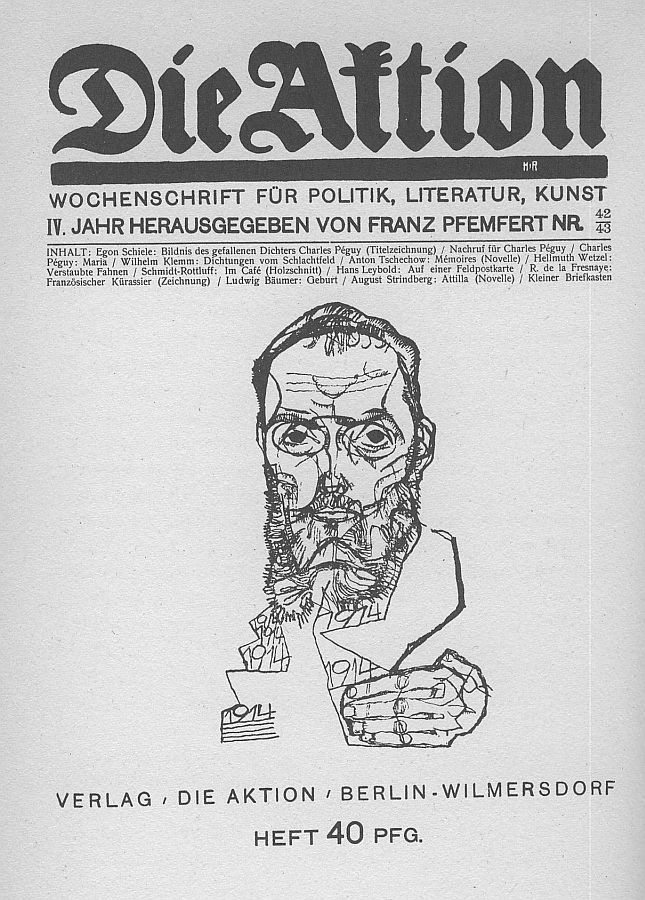
Front page of Die Aktion from October 1914 with a portrait of Charles Péguy by Egon Schiele

Die Aktion ("The Action") was a German literary and political magazine, edited by Franz Pfemfert and published between 1911 and 1932 in Berlin-Wilmersdorf; it promoted literary Expressionism and stood for left-wing politics. To begin with, Die Aktion was published weekly, after 1919 fortnightly, and only sporadically beginning from 1926.

Publication of Die Aktion was resumed in 1981 by the Edition Nautilus publishing house. Issues appear irregularly.

== History ==
=== Beginnings ===
In 1904, Franz Pfemfert became an editor of the anarchist magazine Der Kampf, under the direction of Senna Hoy. There he came into contact with many modern writers and artists, as well as with political opposition groups. One of his early collaborators was Herwarth Walden, future editor of Der Sturm.

After leaving his position at Der Kampf, Pfemfert worked for the magazines Das Blaubuch and Demokrat (becoming the latter's co-editor in 1910). In the radical left-wing Demokrat magazine, which he co-edited with Georg Zepler (1859–1925), he published texts by numerous writers who would later become contributors to Die Aktion. In early 1911 Pfemfert's arrangement with Zepler ended when Zepler, without consulting Pfemfert, dropped a planned article by Kurt Hiller from the list of scheduled contributions. Pfemfert decided that he needed his own magazine; thus was born Die Aktion.

=== 1911–1914: Expressionism and Internationalism ===
The first issue of Die Aktion was published 2 February 1911, with the subheading "Magazine for liberal politics and literature". In 1912 the subheading became "Weekly periodical for politics, literature and art". Pfemfert was the founding editor of the magazine.

Through Pfemfert's contact with Hiller and Hiller's friends in Der Neue Club, who organized evenings of readings with Expressionist artists under the heading "neo-dramatic club", Die Aktion quickly became the leading medium of the new movement. As Pfemfert succeeded in making many writers famous over short periods of time, and formed relations with such publishing houses as Ernst Rowohlt and Samuel Fischer, he received a steady influx of quality contributions (despite the fact that he would not pay any royalties to the writers).

From 1913, several special issues were published which were devoted to poetry, including one issue which was devoted solely to the works of Georg Heym (who had died at age 24 in early 1912). After 1914 the rate of artwork increased — the period is noted for its especially expressive woodcuts published.

In the first issue, Pfemfert outlined the aim of Die Aktion:

"Die Aktion speaks up for the ideas of the large German left-wing parties, without attaching itself to any particular political party. Die Aktion wants to encourage the impressive thoughts of an ‘Organizing of intelligence’, and to help recapture the brilliance of the long frowned-upon words ‘cultural war’. In the areas of art and literature, Die Aktion is looking to create a counterbalance between the sorry habits of the pseudo-liberal press to simply value new movements from a business standpoint to hush them up."

Pfemfert also used the magazine in campaigns such as the freeing of Austrian sex psychologist Otto Gross, who had been arrested and committed by his own father.

=== 1914–1918: opposition during the war ===
The outbreak of war in 1914 worsened the situation, with stricter censorship. Pfemfert decided to publish only those contributions that were purely literary in nature, in order to avoid a complete ban of the magazine. He succeeded against the odds, as Die Aktion never actually stopped the flow of anti-war messages (including virulent articles that had already been featured in other magazines, such as "I Cut Time", and a column of letters to the editor which allowed sharp criticism of artists and intellectuals who were supporting the war). Pfemfert also continued to publish literary articles with veiled antimilitaristic themes, such as poems from the front (including works by Oskar Kanehl and Wilhelm Klemm, who painted a stark picture of trench warfare). Moreover, several issues were entirely dedicated to literature from "enemy countries". From 1915, Pfemfert was involved in the clandestine Antinational Socialist Party.

=== 1918–1925: Weekly periodical for revolutionary socialism ===
Declaring himself disappointed with Expressionism, Pfemfert abandoned his advocacy of the movement (arguing that many writers had become too saturated, and that they only were interested in contracts with large publishing houses — which he understood as a betrayal). He felt that the once rebellious phase of expressionism was finally over, and, in reaction, he only published political texts in Die Aktion. Immediately following the outbreak of the German Revolution, Die Aktion was declared the official organ of the Antinational Socialist Party and advocated social revolution and support for the Russian Revolution. The magazine published a heterogeneous range of writers from Lenin and prominent Bolsheviks, to anarchists like Bakunin. (See below)

Even by the end of 1918, Die Aktion had published an appeal by the Spartacist League, and following the founding of the Communist Party of Germany (KPD), Pfemfert made his magazine the party voice. To that end, he gave Die Aktion a new subheading, that of Weekly periodical for revolutionary socialism. When the KPD changed its policies in October 1919, and began to exclude Syndicalists, Pfemfert tried once again to align Die Aktion with the Left Communist opposition. From 1920 however, he supported the Communist Workers' Party of Germany (KAPD), a Council Communist organization. In the mid-1920s he moved closer to the Free Workers' Union of Germany (FAUD), the Anarcho-Syndicalist of Rudolf Rocker, and published several of Rocker's texts in his magazine. However, it had become apparent by then that the revolutionary cause had lost its momentum.

=== 1926–1932: End ===
Another factor was hyperinflation before the adoption of the Rentenmark.

In 1929 the subheading was changed to Magazine for revolutionary communism, but by then Die Aktion was almost non-existent. In order to save space, texts were eventually printed in smaller and smaller font; in 1929 there were three issues, in 1930 one, in 1931 two, and in August 1932 the very last issue. Alongside economic and political reasons, Pfemfert's worsening health during the late 1920s contributed to the outcome.

== Image ==
Die Aktion was in the quarto format, with double-line spacing. In the beginning, the magazine was in Blackletter, but was changed to Antiqua in 1912 (more in line with its modernist tone).

Most issues were 14 pages long. The magazine was usually headed by Pfemfert's political editorials. Early on, these were printed on the title page, before it was changed to a cover that often featured an Expressionist artwork alongside the magazine's contents.

== Circulation and financing ==
The economic base of Die Aktion was always unstable, despite its initial success among the intelligentsia. At its peak, 7,000 copies were sold. The price started at 10 pfennig, rising to 30 at the outbreak of World War I, then 40, and climbing to 80 pfennig by 1918.

To attract more revenue, a luxury edition was printed on deckle edged paper with a circulation of 100 copies, and sold at four-times the usual price. This came about as Pfemfert wanted to remain independent, printing no advertisements, but also to regularly attend events such as balls, readings and lecture evenings. He turned down contributions from third parties, such as from Paul Cassirer, who made him such an offer during the war.

From 1916, Aktion books were published on the side, and, in 1917, Pfemfert founded Aktions-Buch-und-Kunsthandlung ("Aktion's book and art dealers"), which was run by Pfemfert's wife, Alexandra Ramm-Pfemfert. Based in Kaiserallee 222 (today Bundesallee) in Berlin-Wilmersdorf, it also helped to increase revenue.

== Editing and editorial office ==
At the start, Kurt Hiller and Anarchist Anselm Ruest worked with Pfemfert on the magazine; Ruest left in 1912, and Hiller in 1913. From 1918 to 1929, the poet Oskar Kanehl was Pfemfert's most important collaborator, and Alexandra Ramm-Pfemfert regularly participated in working on the magazine. At least for a short time, there was also a secretary, Lisa Pasedag.

In 1951, Margarete Buber-Neumann became its editor.

== Published artists and writers ==
Published artists and writers
| Art | Literature | | Politics |
|---|---|---|---|
| Alexander Archipenko; Gerd Arntz; André Derain; Conrad Felixmüller; Lyonel Feininger; George Grosz; Ernst Ludwig Kirchner; Alfred Kubin; Wilhelm Lehmbruck; Franz Marc; Henri Matisse; Ludwig Meidner; Max Oppenheimer; Pablo Picasso; Christian Schad; Egon Schiele; Karl Schmidt-Rottluff; Georg Schrimpf; Félix Vallotton; Heinrich Vogeler | Ernst Angel; Hugo Ball; Johannes R. Becher; Gottfried Benn; Ernst Blass; Franz Blei; Paul Boldt; Georg Brandes; Max Brod; James Broh; Theodor Däubler; Albert Ehrenstein; Carl Einstein; André Gide; Claire Goll; Iwan Goll; Ferdinand Hardekopf; Henriette Hardenberg; Max Herrmann-Neisse; Georg Heym; Kurt Hiller; Jakob van Hoddis; Richard Huelsenbeck; Heinrich Eduard Jacob; Franz Jung; Oskar Kanehl; Hermann Kasack | Wilhelm Klemm; Arthur Kronfeld; Else Lasker-Schüler; Hans Leybold; Alfred Lichtenstein; Heinrich Mann; Charles Péguy; Ernst Stadler; Theodor Lessing; Franz Mehring; Erich Mühsam; Mynona; Karl Otten; Erwin Piscator; Ludwig Rubiner; René Schickele; Paul Scheerbart; Walter Serner; Carl Sternheim; Ernst Toller; Frank Wedekind; Franz Werfel; Alfred Wolfenstein; Carl Zuckmayer | Mikhail Bakunin; Alexander Bogdanov; Otto Corbach; Peter Kropotkin; Nadezhda Konstantinovna Krupskaya; Vladimir Lenin; Karl Liebknecht; Anatoliy Vasilievich Lunacharsky; Rosa Luxemburg; Anton Pannekoek; Rudolf Rocker; Otto Rühle; Leon Trotsky |

See Die Aktion on the German language Wikisource for full list of articles.
