= Heinrich Schaefer =

Heinrich Schaefer (1889–1943) was a German writer.

Schaefer was an employee of Die Aktion.

== Publications ==
- (1912) Waffenstudien zur Thidrekssaga. Berlin: Mayer & Müller
- (1918) Drei Erzählungen. Berlin: Die Aktion
