= Ketty Guttmann =

German politician and activist (1833–1967)

- Born: Katherina Ekey; 29 April 1883; Hungen, Hesse, German Empire
- Died: 25 September 1967 (aged 84)
- Occupations: Politician and prostitutes' rights campaigner

Katharine "Ketty" Guttmann (born Katherina Ekey; 29 April 1883 – 25 September 1967) was a German communist politician and campaigner for prostitutes' rights.

== Life ==
Katherina Ekey was born in Hungen, a small town in the hilly countryside to the north of Frankfurt am Main. By the time she had married a man called "Guttmann" she had moved to Hamburg and joined the Social Democratic Party ("Sozialdemokratische Partei Deutschlands" / SPD). In 1914, when war broke out, the decision of the SPD party leadership to support funding for the war was not universally supported within the party, and became more contentious as the slaughter on the frontline and destitution at home grew. In 1917 the party split apart, primarily over the issue of support for the war, and Ketty Guttmann moved over with breakaway faction, which became known as the Independent Social Democratic Party (Unabhängige Sozialdemokratische Partei Deutschlands / USPD). During the year of revolution that followed the war Guttmann gained a reputation as a public speaker and activist. It is not clear when her husband died, but in connection with the events of 1919 she is described as a "36 years old widow". She started a union for prostitutes in Hamburg and fought for collective bargaining rights for prostitutes. The union disintegrated once the revolutionary events died down. When the USPD itself split at the end of 1920 she was part of the majority that made up the newly created German Communist Party.

In 1921 she was elected as a Communist member to the "Hamburgische Bürgerschaft" (as the regional legislature was known), retaining her seat till 1924. She also campaigned for the rights of prostitutes. She was a co-founder, and then one of the two principal contributors, to the weekly news sheet "The Pillory - Publication of the Hamburg Rent Girls" ("Der Pranger – Organ der Hamburger Kontrollmädchen"), which was produced by the Hamburg Prostitutes' Union.

After the short lived Hamburg Uprising in October 1923 she fled to Moscow where she remained for some months. She came home in 1924, disillusioned. Under the slogan "Away from Moscow" ("Los von Moskau") - also the title of a leaflet she published on the subject - she launched a tirade against the Communist Party and the Comintern which she condemned as opportunistic and counter-revolutionary. She called for the Comintern to be broken up because, far from representing the workers' revolution, it simply followed the foreign policy interests of the Soviet Union. In some ways her position came close to that of the breakaway Communist Workers' Party ("Kommunistische Arbeiter-Partei Deutschlands" / KAPD). She found some support for her views among workers' groups in Hamburg, but the Communist Party German leadership, which nurtured cordial relations with its Soviet sister party, was unimpressed, and in July 1924 Ketty Guttmann was expelled from the party.

Outside the party she nevertheless remained active as an extreme left-wing communist, joining the "council communist" General Workers' Union Unity Organisation. Over the next few years she contributed articles to Heinrich Laufenberg's radical left-wing culture journal, "Die Harpune". For most purposes her footprint disappears from subsequent historical sources, but it is known that she survived the Nazi years and relocated to Burscheid from where she was in correspondence with Ruth Fischer in 1947. In the 1950s, she still published in anarchist periodicals.
