= Weick =

Weick is a surname. Notable people with the surname include:

- Ann Weick (1941–2014), American academic in social work
- Bill Weick, American sport wrestler and coach
- Christine Weick (born 1964), American Christian activist and writer
- Fred Weick (1899–1993), American aviator and aircraft designer
- Karl E. Weick (1936–2026), American organizational theorist
- Paul Charles Weick (1899–1997), American judge
