= Die Zeitung =

German-language weekly newspaper published in London during the Second World War

Die Zeitung (English: The Times) was a German-language newspaper in London published during World War II. It had an average circulation of 15,000 to 20,000 from March 1941 to June 1945 and was read for the most part by anti-Nazi members of the German diaspora. A lighter version was sold overseas and airdropped over Nazi Germany by the Royal Air Force.

The paper mainly covered news about the ongoing war and the situation in Nazi Germany. In its first issue the paper claimed it was the only free and uncensored German-language newspaper left in Europe.

== See also ==
- Exilliteratur
