= Hans Siemsen =

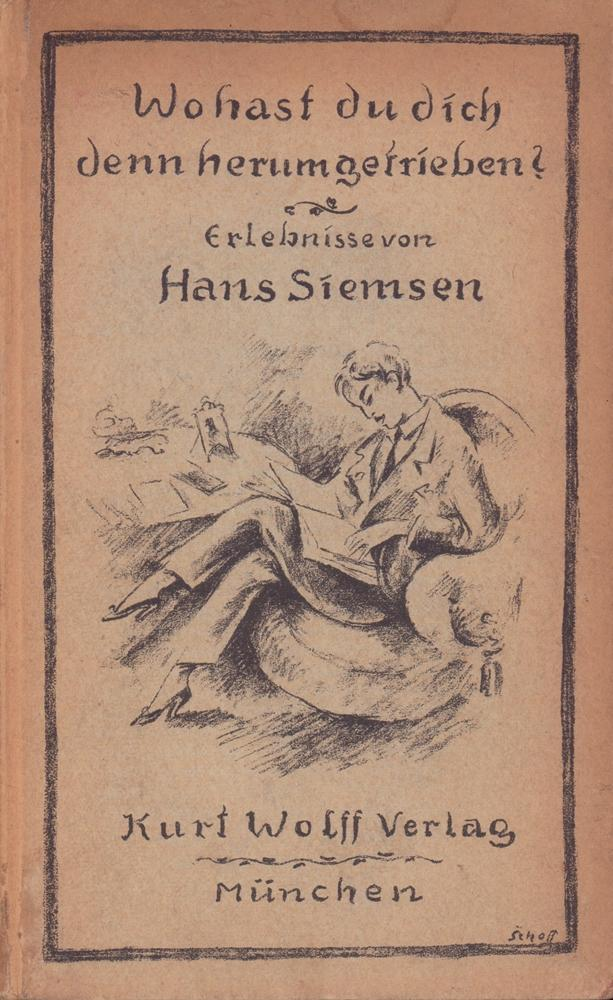
Hans Siemsen - Wo hast du dich denn herumgetrieben ? (1920)

Hans Siemsen (Pseudonym: Pfarrer Silesius; 27 March 1891, in Hamm – 23 June 1969, in Essen) was a German writer and journalist.

Siemen was a theatre and film critic in the Weimar Republic working for Die Weltbühne and the 8 Uhr- Abendblatts and other newspapers. He was one of the first critics to appreciate Charlie Chaplin and also praised Asta Nielsen. He was interested in the visual arts, friendly with both Alfred Flechtheim and Renée Sintenis.

He was also a left-wing political activist and one of the writers who signed the appeal by the Antinational Socialist Party.

During the following years after the NSDAP took power, he was exiled to Paris and later to USA where he worked as a journalist for the press and radio.

Siemen returned to Germany in 1949 and lived in Düsseldorf until he died at the age of 78 in Essen.
