= Monster Energy v. Monsta Pizza =

2017 trademark claim

Monster Energy v. Monsta Pizza was a 2017 trademark claim brought by Monster Energy against Monsta Pizza in Wendover, Buckinghamshire, in the UK Intellectual Property Office in 2017.

== Background ==
Monsta Pizza was founded in 2017. When the founders tried to register as trademark their pizza concept that involved a green monster, Monster Energy opposed their application and claimed, "Monsta element of the trademark is the dominant element and the word pizza is non-distinctive". Monsta Pizza features a monster shared oven, which is also reflected in its logo.

== Outcome ==
After the Intellectual Property Office decided in favor of Monsta Pizza in August 2018, Monster Energy appealed to the Court of Appeal, who ruled in favor of Monsta Pizza. The Court of Appeal rejected the bid "in its entirety." Despite victory, the owners of Monsta Pizza stated that they suffered large expenses due to the legal action. They incurred £11,000 in total but claimed £2,860 back.
