= Henriette Hardenberg =

German-Jewish poet (1894–1993)

Henriette Hardenberg (February 5, 1894 – October 26, 1993), born Margarete Rosenberg, was a German-Jewish poet who emigrated to Britain in the late 1930s. In the 1910s, she was part of the circle of writers around the magazine Die Aktion, which championed literary Expressionism. In her poems, she examined the relationship between people and their bodies, especially the skin as both an interface between self and world and a limiting factor. In a late interview, she said that her work expressed a desire to transcend the limits of the body. Hardenberg was one of the few women among German Expressionist writers, and one recent reevaluation of her oeuvre ranks her work among the best of the Expressionists.

== Biography ==
Henriette Hardenberg was born Margarete Rosenberg in Berlin, Germany. Her parents were Hugo Rosenberg, a lawyer, and Marie Anne (Rosenstein) Rosenberg. She had a brother, Hans, who was instrumental in helping her to establish her first literary contacts.

In 1913, her poetry and prose began appearing in the Expressionist magazine Die Aktion. She published her first two poems under her own name, but her father forbade her from doing so again, so she adopted the pseudonym 'Henriette Hardenberg' and used it for the rest of her life. Through her connection with Die Aktion, she got to know such writers as Else Lasker-Schüler and Ludwig Meidner. During this period, she studied dance at the Dalcroze School, and she often wrote about dancers and deployed metaphors related to bodies and movement in her poetry.

During World War I she served as a nurse at the Rudolf Virchow Hospital in Berlin. In 1916, she moved to Munich, where she built friendships with writers such as Rainer Maria Rilke (with whom she was especially close), Johannes R. Becher, Emmy Hennings, and Oskar Maria Graf.

In 1924, she moved back to Berlin, where she worked as an actor and model. In 1929, she took a job as private secretary to the American art professor Richard Offner, an expert in early Florentine painting. Hardenberg remained involved with Offner's projects for another thirty years.

In 1937, Hardenberg took refuge in London from Nazi Germany. During the war, she worked in a photography business because Offner's work was on hiatus. In 1948, she became a British citizen. She died in 1993.

During her lifetime, Hardenberg published one book of poems, Neigungen (Tendencies). A planned a second collection, Südliches Herz (Southern Heart), was published posthumously in 1994. She also published in various magazines besides Die Aktion and had her poems included in several anthologies.

== Personal life ==
In 1916, she married the German poet, translator, and critic Alfred Wolfenstein, and the couple moved to Munich, where their son Frank was born. They separated in 1929 and divorced the following year, though they remained friends until Wolfenstein's death in 1945.

In 1938, she married the artist and designer Kurt Frankenschwerth, whom she had known since the early 1920s.

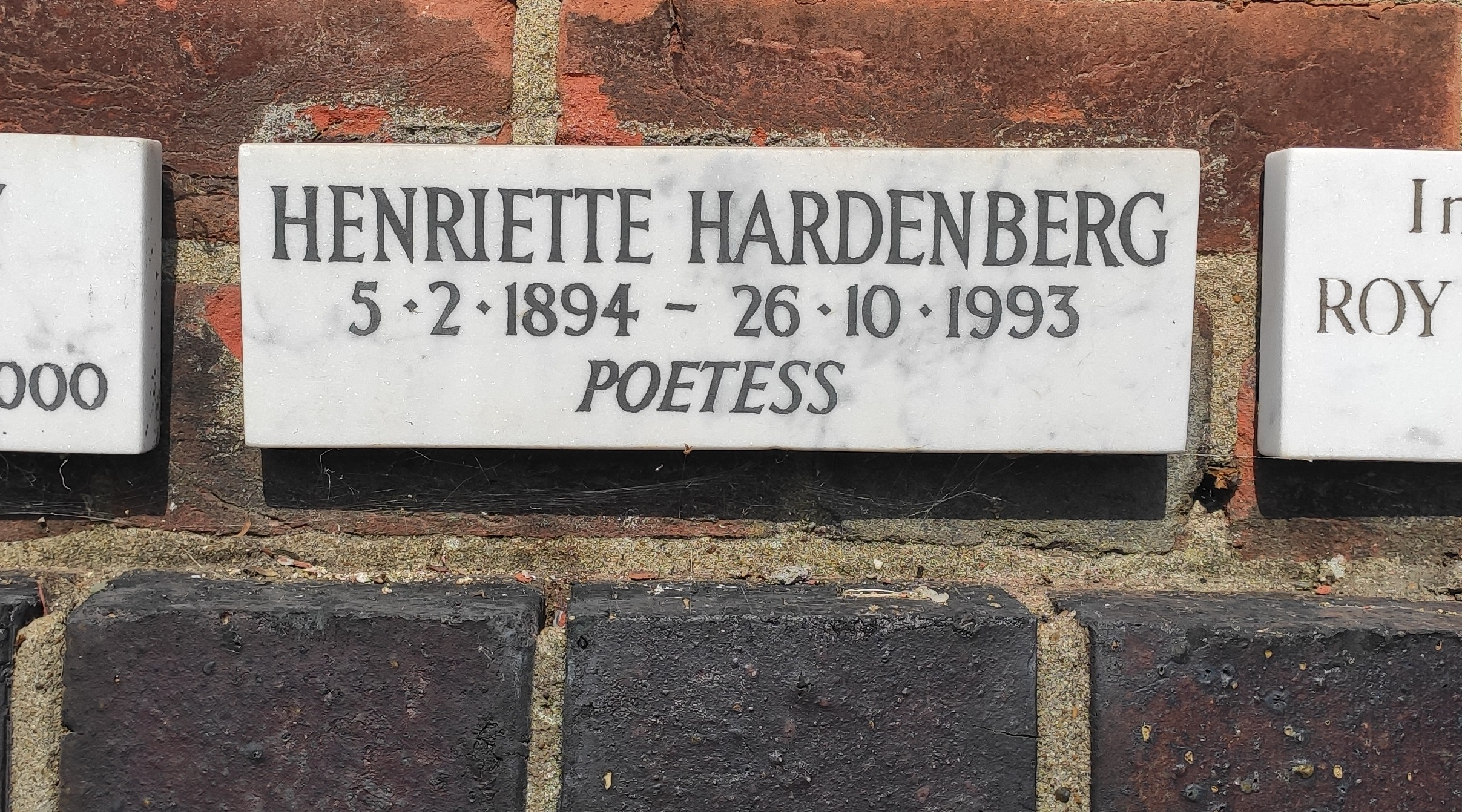
Plaque dedicated to Hardenberg at Golders Green Crematorium

Hardenberg died in 1993 at the age of 99. She was cremated at Golders Green Crematorium.
