= Ludwig Bäumer =

Ludwig Bäumer (1 September 1888 – 28 August 1928) was a German writer and Communist activist.

== Biography ==
Bäumer was born in Melle, Germany, on September 1, 1888. He studied law in Göttingen, but interrupted his studies in 1911 to enter the artists' colony of Worpswede. He participated in World War I as a sergeant, but afterwards began to oppose the war. He was a delegate at the founding congress of the Communist Party of Germany in Berlin. He was involved with the Antinational Socialist Party signing their Appeal when they emerged from clandestiny in November 1918 following the German Revolution. Bäumer was imprisoned in 1919 because of a government crackdown, and afterwards he resigned from the Communist Party. He published a book called The Essence of Communism the same year. In 1920, Kurt Schwitters created a Merz Picture collage based on him.

Bäumer moved to Worpswede again in 1922, as Managing Director of the premises. Later, he lived as a freelance writer in Munich and Berlin. In 1927, Christian Schad painted his portrait. Bäumer died after committing suicide on 28 August 1928 in Berlin.
