= Otto Rühle =

German Marxist theorist and politician (1874–1943)

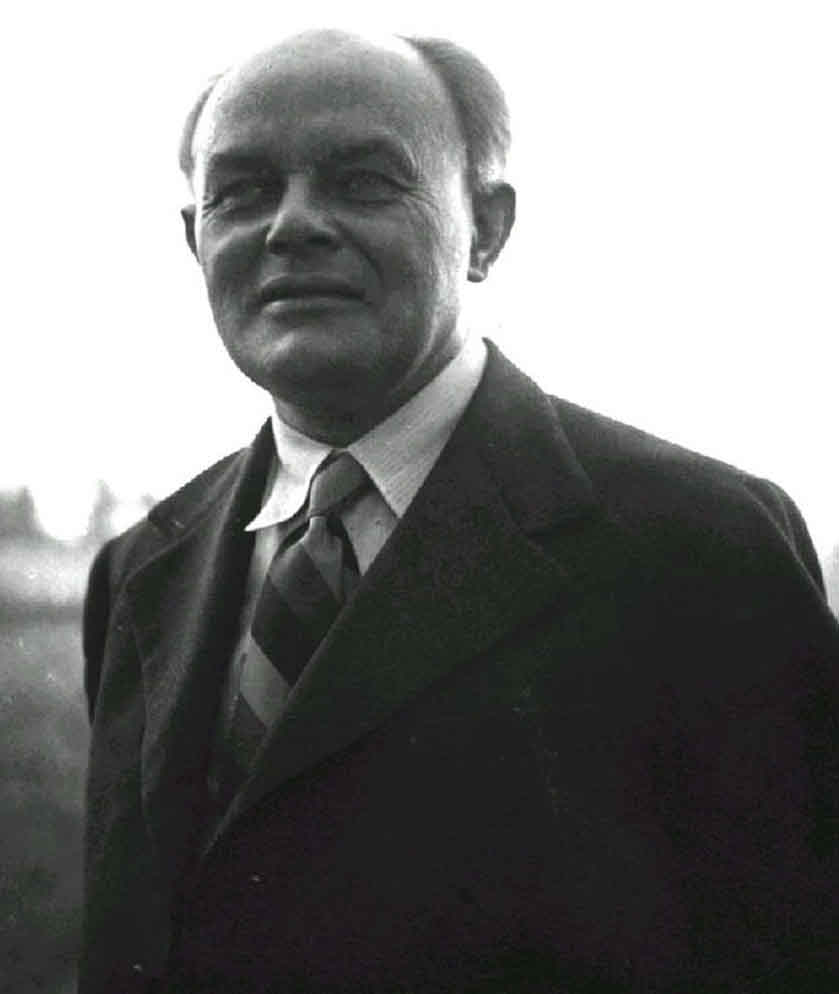
- Rühle c. 1930

Member of the Reichstag for Saxony 8
- In office 12 January 1912 – 9 November 1918
- Preceded by: Otto Hanisch
- Succeeded by: Constituency abolished

Personal details
- Born: Karl Heinrich Otto Rühle; 23 October 1874 Großschirma, German Empire
- Died: 24 June 1943 (aged 68) Mexico City, Mexico
- Party: SPD (1896–1916); KPD (1918–1920); KAPD (1920); AAUE (1921–1923)
- Other political affiliations: Spartacus League (1916–1918); IKD (1918)
- Spouse: Alice Gerstel (m. 1921)
- Occupation: Writer; Politician; Educator

Karl Heinrich Otto Rühle (German: [ˈʁyːlə]; 23 October 1874 – 24 June 1943) was a German Marxist writer, educator, Reichstag deputy, and prominent theorist of the council-communist movement. He is known for his rejection of party politics in favour of workers' councils, his critique of Bolshevism, and his famous declaration: "The revolution is not a party affair".

Initially a member of the Social Democratic Party (SPD), Rühle became a prominent voice in the party's left wing. Along with Karl Liebknecht, he was one of the first Reichstag deputies to vote against war credits in 1915. He was a co-founder of the Communist Party of Germany (KPD) but left in 1919 to play a leading role in the Communist Workers' Party of Germany (KAPD). After his break with the KAPD in late 1920, he developed a political tendency that was both anti-party and anti-union, centred on the Allgemeine Arbeiter-Union – Einheitsorganisation (AAU-E).

Writing under the pseudonym Carl Steuermann, Rühle produced a pioneering Marxist analysis of fascism in the early 1930s. His theoretical work extended to a critique of the Soviet Union as a form of state capitalism and of Bolshevism as a bourgeois ideology, famously equating it with fascism as "Red Fascism". After fleeing Nazi Germany in 1933, he spent his final years in exile in Mexico, where he participated in the Dewey Commission to investigate the Moscow Trials. He died in Mexico City in 1943. Largely forgotten for a time, Rühle was rediscovered by the anti-authoritarian student movement of the 1960s, and his writings have remained influential in libertarian socialist and council-communist circles.

== Early life and Social Democratic Party ==
Otto Rühle was born on 23 October 1874 in Großschirma, Saxony, the son of a railway official. He studied at the teacher's seminary in Oschatz from 1889 and became an official in the Freethinker movement while still a student. After working as a private tutor and a teacher, he was dismissed from his post as a primary school teacher in 1902.

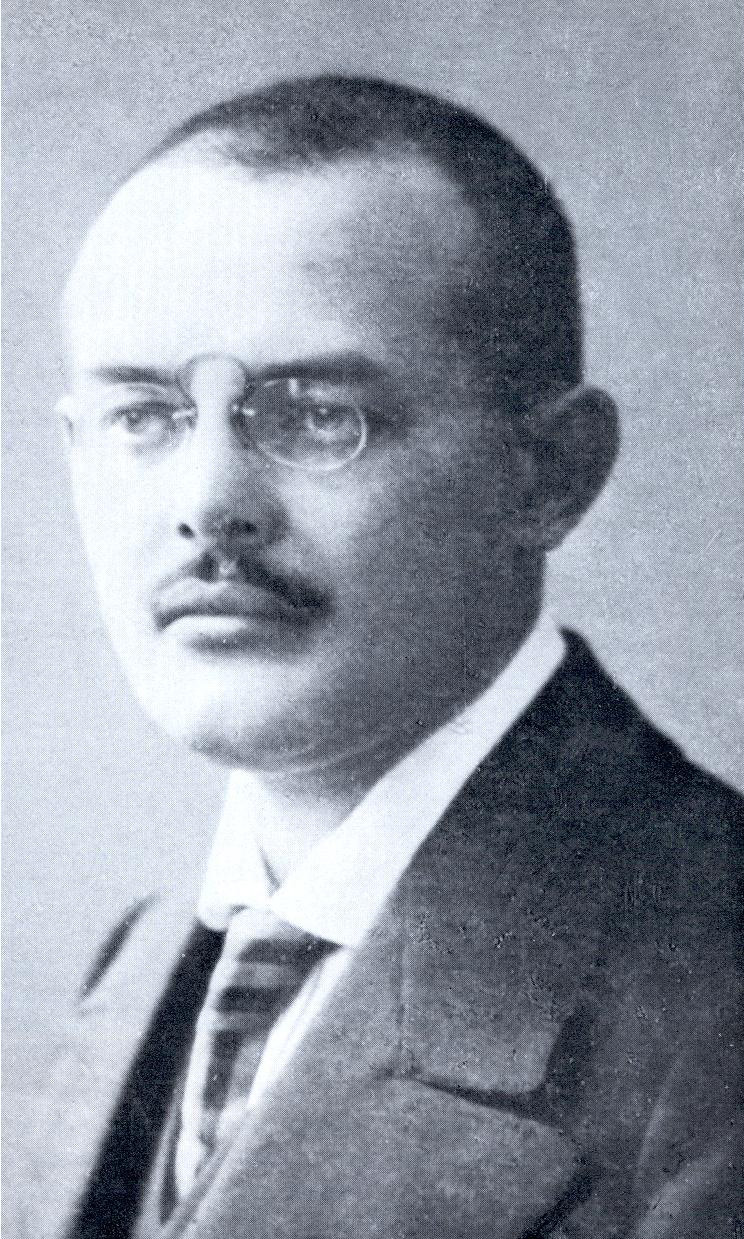
Rühle's official Reichstag portrait, 1912

Rühle had joined the Social Democratic Party (SPD) in 1896 and founded a socialist Sunday school. After his dismissal, he became a writer and editor for social-democratic newspapers in Hamburg, Breslau, Chemnitz, Pirna, and Zwickau. He was an early critic of what he saw as outdated teaching methods and became a leader of the social-democratic education society in Hamburg. In 1907, he became a traveling teacher for the SPD's central committee, gaining a national reputation for his socially critical pedagogical writings, including Das proletarische Kind (The Proletarian Child) in 1911. In 1912, Rühle was elected as the Reichstag deputy for the Saxony 8 constituency (representing Pirna-Sebnitz), a position he held until 1918.

Rühle was part of the far-left wing of the SPD, alongside figures like Karl Liebknecht, Rosa Luxemburg, and Franz Mehring. Together with Liebknecht, he was one of the first Reichstag deputies to vote against war credits in March 1915. In 1916, in solidarity with the imprisoned Liebknecht, he resigned from the SPD parliamentary faction. He was a co-founder of the Spartacus League and participated in its conference on 1 January 1916. His public call for a party split in a letter to the SPD newspaper Vorwärts on 12 January 1916 put him in opposition to Rosa Luxemburg, who still hoped to win over the party leadership. Rühle did not join the Independent Social Democratic Party (USPD) when it was formed in 1917, but instead became a leader of the Left Radicals (Linksradikale) in Dresden and Pirna.

== German Revolution and communist left ==
=== German Revolution ===
During the German Revolution of 1918–1919, Rühle played a prominent role in the workers' councils movement in Dresden. On 9 November 1918, he became chairman of the Revolutionary Worker and Soldier Council and, a day later, co-chairman of the United Revolutionary Worker and Soldier Council of Greater Dresden. However, on 16 November, he and other members of the International Communists of Germany (IKD) resigned from their functions, refusing to cooperate with the SPD and USPD.

At the founding congress of the Communist Party of Germany (KPD) in late December 1918, Rühle was a delegate for the IKD and a leader of the opposition that argued strongly against any participation in the upcoming elections for the Weimar National Assembly. Despite his disagreements with the party leadership, he was tasked with helping build the KPD in Saxony in early 1919. Throughout the year, he, along with Heinrich Laufenberg and Fritz Wolffheim, became a leader of the party's left opposition. This opposition rejected the KPD's turn towards parliamentarism and trade union work, advocating instead for direct action through factory organisations and workers' councils.

At the KPD's second party congress in Heidelberg in October 1919, Rühle and other ultra-left delegates were forced to leave the proceedings after voting against the leadership's "Theses on Communist Principles and Tactics". The third party congress in February 1920 formally expelled Rühle from the KPD.

=== KAPD and break with the Comintern ===
In April 1920, Rühle was a co-founder of the Communist Workers' Party of Germany (KAPD), which brought together the expelled left wing of the KPD. In June 1920, he traveled to Moscow as a KAPD delegate to the Second World Congress of the Comintern. Rühle returned from Russia profoundly disillusioned, convinced that the Russian Revolution was degenerating and that the Bolsheviks were imposing an authoritarian and bureaucratic model on the international workers' movement. He refused to remain at the congress and argued for a complete break with the Third International. This stance put him at odds with the KAPD leadership, which still hoped to fight for its positions within the Comintern, and he was expelled from the KAPD in December 1920.

From this point on, Rühle became a leading theorist of a council communism that was explicitly anti-party and anti-union. He collaborated with Franz Pfemfert and the journal Die Aktion and was a key figure in the Allgemeine Arbeiter-Union – Einheitsorganisation (AAU-E), an organisation that attempted to unite political and economic struggle outside of the traditional party and trade union forms.

== Exile, psychology, and death ==
After the Nazi seizure of power in 1933, Rühle's house was ransacked by the SA, and he emigrated to Prague with his wife, Alice Rühle-Gerstel, a noted psychologist and writer whom he had married in 1921. In Prague, he became involved in pedagogical work. Rühle's work from this period shows the influence of his wife's background in the individual psychology of Alfred Adler, which he attempted to synthesize with Marxism.

In 1936, Rühle and his wife moved to Mexico, where he had been appointed as an educational advisor to the government. In Mexico, he became associated with Leon Trotsky and was a member of the Dewey Commission in 1937, which investigated the charges made against Trotsky in the Moscow Trials. As a result of this activity, he lost his government advisory position due to pressure from Stalinists. He spent his final years living as a painter under the pseudonym Carlos Timonero.

Otto Rühle died in Mexico City on 24 June 1943. His wife, Alice, committed suicide later the same day. At their funeral, eulogies were given by, among others, Franz Pfemfert and Fritz Fränkel.

== Political and theoretical thought ==
=== Party and revolution ===
Rühle is most famous for his dictum, "The revolution is not a party affair". This encapsulated his fundamental critique of the party form as an instrument of proletarian revolution. For Rühle, all parties were inherently bourgeois in their structure and function, aiming to exercise power on behalf of the working class, rather than enabling the class to exercise power itself. He argued that the revolutionary organisation of the proletariat could only be the workers' councils, which encompassed the entire class and were the direct expression of its self-activity. This position, which he developed after 1920, distinguished him from the mainstream of the KAPD and theorists like Herman Gorter, who continued to see the need for a vanguard party to lead the councils. Rühle's rejection of the party form was a foundational element of his council-communist theory and a key reason for the later influence of his ideas in anarchist and libertarian circles.

=== Critique of Bolshevism ===
Rühle was one of the earliest and most trenchant left-communist critics of Bolshevism. Based on his experiences in Soviet Russia in 1920, he came to view the Bolshevik state not as a proletarian dictatorship, but as a new form of bureaucratic rule. He argued that the Bolshevik revolution was not a proletarian but a bourgeois revolution, which had carried out the tasks of modernizing and industrializing Russia under a state-capitalist regime. The Bolshevik Party, in his analysis, was not a party of the working class but of a new ruling class of intellectuals and bureaucrats. He saw the Comintern's centralized and militarized structure as an attempt to impose this Russian model on the workers' movements of the West, a policy he believed would be disastrous. This critique led him to break decisively with the Comintern and the KAPD.

=== Analysis of fascism and state capitalism ===
Under the pseudonym Carl Steuermann, Rühle authored one of the first Marxist analyses of fascism, Weltkrise – Weltwende. Kurs auf den Staatskapitalismus (World Crisis – World Turn. The Course towards State Capitalism, 1931). He saw fascism not as a uniquely Italian or German phenomenon, but as a general tendency of modern capitalism in its period of crisis. For Rühle, both bourgeois democracy and fascism were forms of capitalist rule, and the development of capitalism was leading all countries towards a form of state capitalism, characterized by the fusion of economic and political power.

In his 1939 work Fascisme brun, fascisme rouge (Brown Fascism, Red Fascism), Rühle controversially argued that the Soviet system under Stalin was a form of "Red Fascism", structurally equivalent to the Nazi regime in Germany. He saw both systems as totalitarian forms of state capitalism, which, despite their ideological differences, shared a common basis in the suppression of workers' self-activity and the centralized control of the economy by a bureaucratic ruling class. His work The Struggle Against Fascism Begins with the Struggle Against Bolshevism (1939) further elaborated on this theme.

== Legacy ==
Largely forgotten for a period after his death, Otto Rühle was rediscovered by the anti-authoritarian student movement of the 1960s. His writings were widely circulated, often in pirated editions (Raubdrucke), and he became a popular figure in the emerging New Left. His uncompromising critique of the party-form, his early analysis of the Soviet Union as state-capitalist, and his theory of fascism continue to be influential in council-communist and libertarian socialist milieus. His insistence on the self-emancipation of the working class through its own autonomous organs of struggle, the workers' councils, remains a central theme in anti-Leninist Marxism.

== Works ==
- ''Das proletarische Kind'' (1911)
- ''Erziehung zum Sozialismus'' (1919)
- ''Der USPD Frieden!'' (1919)
- ''Die Revolution ist keine Parteisache'' (1920)
- ''Das kommunistische Schulprogramm'' (1920)
- ''Die Räte'' (1921)
- ''Liebe–Ehe–Familie'' (1921)
- ''Arbeitsschule: Sozialisierung der Frau'' (1922)
- ''Grundfragen der Organisation'' (1922)
- ''Von der bürgerlichen zur proletarischen Revolution'' (1924)
- ''Die Revolutionen Europas'', Vols. 1–3 (1927)
- ''Karl Marx. Leben und Werk'' (1928)
- ''Illustrierte Kultur- und Sittengeschichte des Proletariats'' (1930)
- ''Weltkrise – Weltwende. Kurs auf den Staatskapitalismus'' (1931, as Carl Steuermann)
- ''Der Mensch auf der Flucht'' (1932, as Carl Steuermann)
- ''The Struggle Against Fascism Begins with the Struggle Against Bolshevism'' (1939)
- ''Fascisme brun, fascisme rouge'' (1939)

== See also ==
- Exilliteratur
- List of peace activists

== Sources ==
- Otto Rühle at the Marxists Internet Archive.
- Otto Rühle at Kurasje.org.
- "Non-Leninist Marxism: Writings on the Workers Councils" (2007). St. Petersburg, Florida: Red and Black Publishers. ISBN 978-0-9791813-6-8. It includes Ruhle's "The Revolution is Not a Party Affair" and "Report From Moscow".
