= Christine Weick =

American Christian activist

Christine Weick (born 1962) is an American Christian activist and author who gained national exposure during the 2010s. She has protested against Muslims inside Muslim places of worship, against homosexuality, and holiday traditions like Santa Claus and the Easter Bunny. She asserted in a now-viral video that the logo of Monster Energy sports drink depicts the number of the beast.

== Biography ==
Christine Weick is from Michigan. She was born in 1964. Weick has given a number of interviews over the years describing growing up in a strict Christian Reformed family. She was not allowed to watch television or listen to music. At some point she rebelled and turned to witchcraft. "It was the ultra-form of rebellion against God, to worship the devil outright," she said. She had a baby in high school out of wedlock, was convinced by her mother to marry the father, after which she proceeded to cheat on him regularly. After their divorce, she married her second husband. Her new step-daughter owned a CD release by the heavy metal band White Zombie, which contained lyrics that, upon discovering the CD in 1995, Weick deemed Satanic and shocking in nature; Weick has since stated, "I gave my life to the Lord right there, thinking, 'Okay Lord, the devil's done with me now. Now I'm going to work for you.'"

== Activism ==
In 2011 she published the book Explain This! A Verse by Verse Explanation of the Book of Revelation.

In October 2013 she drove to Detroit from Hopkins, Michigan to protest against same-sex marriage in Michigan with a sign which said "God opposes gay marriage".

In May 2014 Weick protested against gay rights on Mother's Day in Grandville, Michigan, holding a sign that read "Thank your mom today for not being gay." The protest was filmed by a local news station, who also filmed an angry woman who threw a strawberry-flavored slush beverage at Weick.

In November 2014, a video of Weick speculating a relation between Monster Energy and Satan was published on YouTube, garnering over 13 million views as of 2020. The "success" of the video got her on Comedy Central's Tosh.0 Web Redemption. This was not the first time she had made this claim. She speculated the same thing on a podcast several years earlier. Monster Energy denied that her complaints reflected their product.

Also in November 2014, Weick protested at a Muslim prayer service at the Washington National Cathedral, telling worshipers "Jesus Christ died on that cross. He is the reason we are to worship only Him. Jesus Christ is our Lord and Savior." She was promptly escorted out. She was reportedly living out of her car at the time of this incident.

In January 2015, Christine attended the 7th Annual Texas Muslim Capitol Day with several other protestors who carried pro-Christian signs. At one point during a speech, Christine interrupted the speaker by taking the microphone away from her and proclaimed Jesus Christ as the Savior and said that Islam would never take over Texas or the United States. Weick approached a speaker at the event from behind and grabbed the microphone, declaring that "Islam will never dominate in the United States, and by the grace of God it will not dominate Texas."

In February 2015, she interrupted another event, referred to as "Muslim Day" at the Oklahoma State Capitol in Oklahoma City, Oklahoma. She was removed from the building while trying to recite the Lord's Prayer during a Muslim call to prayer.

On October 30, 2015, Weick protested the Greater Church of Lucifer located in Spring, Texas. During the TV interview, she said, "This is what we get when we have Freedom of Religion!"

She has protested some church Easter events. She yelled at a person dressed as the Easter Bunny in a Tennessee church parking lot, "You are nothing more than Santa Claus coming into a Christian Church! Shame on you!" She protested at the First Freewill Baptist Church's Easter egg hunt.

Christine once operated a Facebook page titled Conservative Christians for Christine Weick, where she expressed interest in female circumcision.

== See also ==
- Westboro Baptist Church
