= Alice Rühle-Gerstel =

German-Jewish writer, psychologist

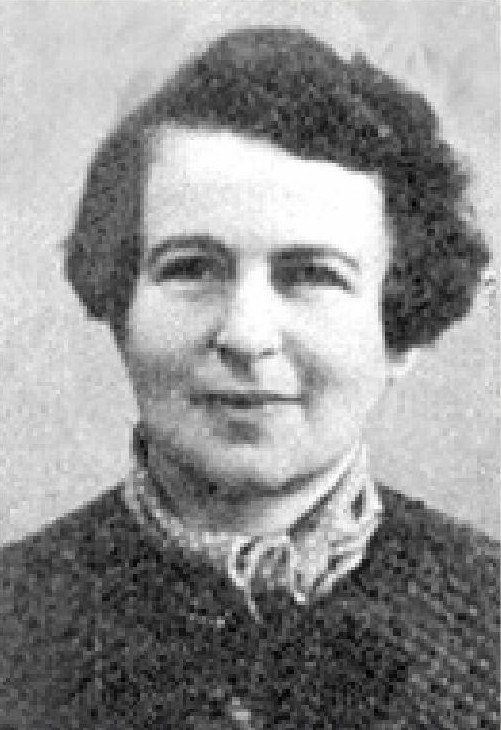
- Alice Rühle-Gerstel, circa 1929
- Born: Alice Gerstel; 24 March 1894; Prague, Austria-Hungary
- Died: 24 June 1943 (aged 49); Mexico, Mexico City
- Occupations: Writer, feminist, and psychologist

Alice Rühle-Gerstel (24 March 1894 – 24 June 1943) was a writer, feminist, and psychologist.

== Biography ==
Alice Gerstel was born into a Jewish family. She attended a girls' boarding school in Dresden, then the lyceum and the German-language teacher-training college in Prague.

She was a nurse in the First World War. From 1917 to 1921 she studied literature and philosophy in Prague and Munich. In 1921, she completed a doctorate on Friedrich Schlegel. In the same year she married Otto Rühle, a Left-communist student of Alfred Adler, and together with Grete Fantl founded the Marxist Individual-psychological Study Association of Dresden.

In 1924, she co-founded the publisher "Am Ufer ändern - Dresden-Buchholz-Friedewald" and produced monthly articles defending socialist education.

Alice Rühle-Gerstel struck up a great friendship with Milena Jesenská. As a socialist, she was no longer safe at the beginning of Nazi rule in Germany, so in 1932 she returned to her native city of Prague. From 1933 she worked on the children's supplement of the Prager Tagblatt. Her search for identity here is described in the autobiographical novel "Der Umbruch oder die Freiheit und Hanna". But she left Prague after a few years and in 1936, followed her husband to Mexico, who had family there. In Mexico, she worked as a translator in a government office and as a trade journalist. Despite friendships with Trotsky, Frida Kahlo and Diego Rivera in Mexico, she never felt comfortable there, and ended up committing suicide on the day of the death of her husband in June 1943.

== Main works ==
- Freud und Adler. Elementare Einführung in Psychoanalyse und Individualpsychologie. Dresden 1924
- Der Weg zum Wir. Versuch einer Verbindung von Marxismus und Individualpsychologie. Dresden 1927, Nachdruck München 1980
- Das Frauenproblem der Gegenwart – Eine psychologische Bilanz. Leipzig 1932, Nachdruck unter dem Titel Die Frau und der Kapitalismus. Frankfurt/Main 1973 (darin das Zitat: "Die ganze Welt, wie sie heute ist, ist Männerwelt")
- Der Umbruch oder Hanna und die Freiheit, 1984 (posthumous).

== Other texts (selection) ==
- Das proletarische Kind. Rezension des Buches von Otto Rühle. In: Die Frau im Staat, München, 4. Jg./05.1922/Heft V/S. 3
- Der Hexenwahn. In: Frauenstimme. Beilage für die Frauen proletarischer Freidenker. In: Atheist. Illustrierte Wochenschrift für Volksaufklärung, Nürnberg / Leipzig, 22. Jg (2. Jg.)/Februar 1925/Nr. 2/S. 7–8
- Über die Eifersucht als weibliche Sicherung. In: Internationale Zeitschrift für Individualpsychologie, Wien, 3. Jg./Dezember 1925/Heft 6/S. 314–320
- Über Prostitution. In: Schriftenreihe des Freidenkerverlages, Leipzig, 1. Jg./ca. 1927/Heft 5/S. 82–84
- Der autonome Mensch. In: Schriftenreihe des Freidenkerverlages, Leipzig, 1. Jg./ca. 1927/Heft 8/S. 132–136
- Beruf und Gesellschaft. Referat auf der Tagung der Entschiedenen Schulreformer und Leitsätze. 29. September bis 2. Oktober 1928 in Dresden. In: Beruf, Mensch, Schule. Tagungsbuch der Entschiedenen Schulreformer, Hrsg. Paul Oestreich und Erich Viehweg, Frankfurt am Main 1929, S. 21–31; 181–183
- Die neue Frauenfrage. In: Die literarische Welt, Berlin: 5. Jg./1929/Nr. 11/S. 1–2
- Hartwig, Mela: Das Weib ist ein Nichts. Rezension. In: Die Literarische Welt, Berlin: 5. Jg./1929/Nr. 38/S. 5
- An die unpolitischen Frauen. Beitrag zum Sammelartikel: Deutschland, wie sie es sich wünschen. In: Die literarische Welt, Berlin: 6. Jg./1930/Nr. 13/S. 6
- Die entthronte Libido. Bemerkungen zu Freuds "Das Unbehagen in der Kultur". In: Internationale Zeitschrift für Individualpsychologie, Wien: 8. Jg./Dezember 1930/Heft 6/S. 558–566
- Untergang der Ehe. In: Die literarische Welt, Berlin: 6. Jg./1930/Nr. 24/S. 1–2
- Frauen und Liebesgeschichten. Ein kleiner Bericht. In: Die literarische Welt, Berlin: 7. Jg./1931/Nr. 12/S. 9–10
- Lebensregeln für Menschen von heute. Was man mit Enttäuschungen und Unglück anfangen soll. In: Die literarische Welt, Berlin: 7. Jg./1931/Nr. 38/S. 3–4
- Überall Frauen. In: Prager Tagblatt, Prag/57. Jg./9. August 1932/Nr. 187/S. 4
- Abschaffung des Geschlechtsverkehrs. Rezension des Buches Neugeburt der Ehe von Hans Sterneder. In: Prager Tagblatt, Prag/57. Jg./31. Dezember 1932/Nr. 308/S. 3
- Beitrag zur Rundfrage: Bilanz der Frauenbewegung. In: Die literarische Welt, Berlin: 8. Jg./1932/Nr. 10/S. 3–4
- Mann und Frau von heute. I. Die Frau wird losgesprochen. In: Die literarische Welt, Berlin: 8. Jg./1932/Nr. 41/42/S. 7 (Kopie FSA/BS)
- Die literarische Welt der Frau. Zurück zur guten alten Zeit?. In: Die literarische Welt, Berlin: 9. Jg./1933/Nr. 4/S. 5–6
- Erinnerungen an meine Zukunft. In: Prager Tagblatt, 60. Jg./15. Dezember 1935/Nr. 292/Jubiläumsnummer – Beilage Nr. 6/S. 3 (Kopie FSA/BS)
- Unter dem Pseudonym "Lizzi Kritzel": Ein Nachmittag bei hungernden Kindern (im Erzgebirge). In: Prager Tagblatt, 61. Jg./29. März 1936/Nr. 76/S. 4–5
- In welchem Alter wird die Frau alt? In: Prager Tagblatt, o. J., S. 29. Institut für Zeitgeschichte München – Archiv, Sign. EO 227/5
- Kein Gedicht für Trotzki. Tagebuchaufzeichnungen aus Mexico. Neue Kritik, Frankfurt am Main 1979, ISBN 3-8015-0163-9
