= Julius Keller =

German expressionist poet (1890–1946)

Julius Talbot Keller (21 December 1890, in Aachen – 16 May 1946, in Aachen) was a German expressionist poet. He was associated with the Circle of Rheinish Expressionists. After spending 1914-1917 in the German Army, he went into exile in Switzerland where he was active in literary circles. He endeavoured to capture the nightmare experience of life at the frontline.

== Publications ==
- (1916) Budgetrecht und Organisationsgewalt Heidelberg: Rössler & Herbert
- (1918) Durchblutung Berlin: Aktion
- (1919) Was sind Revolutionen? Halle: Joest
