= Oskar Kanehl =

Oskar Kanehl (5 October 1888 in Berlin – 28 May 1929 in Berlin) was a German poet and communist activist.

Kanehl studied literature and philosophy at the University of Würzburg and University of Greifswald before moving to the village of Weick in 1912. From 1913 he published Die Wiecker Boten (The Weicker Messenger) a left-wing literary-political monthly. He also contributed to Franz Pfemfert's Die Aktion. The Wiecker Bote was banned with the outbreak of the war, and Kanehl moved to Berlin where he continued his anti-militarist activism.

He committed suicide by jumping from his window on 28 May 1929. Erich Mühsam and Franz Pfemfert spoke at his funeral. He is buried at the Stahnsdorf South-Western Cemetery.
