= Heinrich Eduard Jacob =

American dramatist

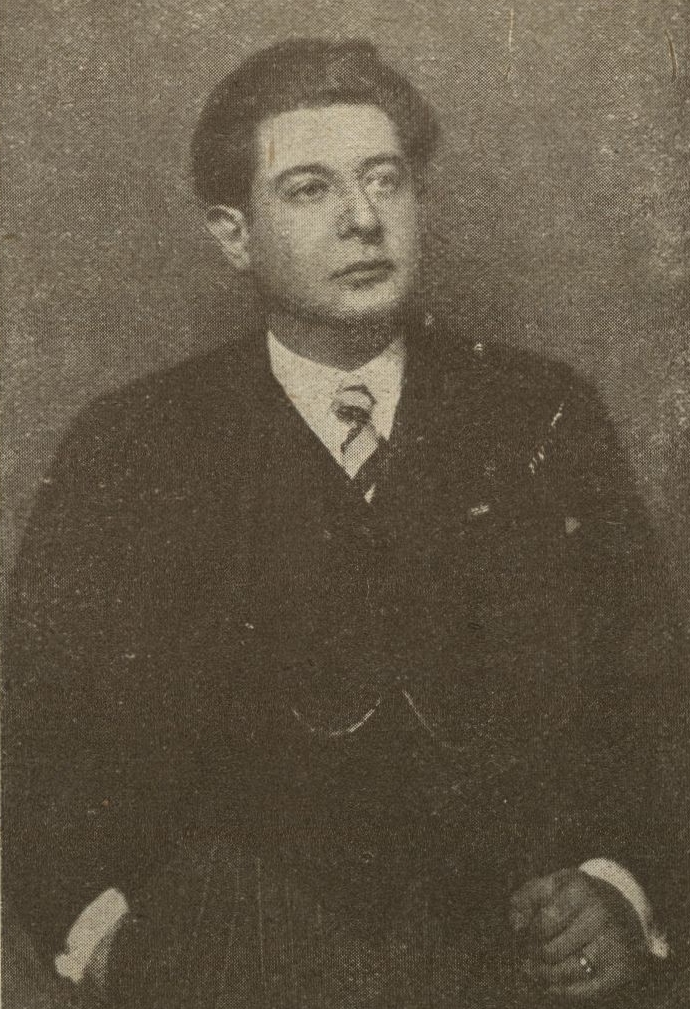
- Photo by Berthold Friedmann, Vienna, ~1928
- Born: Henry Edward Jacob; 7 October 1889; Friedrichstadt, Berlin
- Died: 25 October 1967 (aged 78); Berlin
- Other name: Eric Jens Petersen
- Education: Frederick William University
- Years active: c.1909 - 1959
- Notable credit(s): New York Times, Berliner Tageblatt
- Spouse: Dora Angel

Heinrich Eduard Jacob (7 October 1889 – 25 October 1967) was a German and American journalist and author. Born to a Jewish family in Berlin and raised partly in Vienna, Jacob worked for two decades as a journalist and biographer before the rise to power of the Nazi Party. Interned in the late 1930s in the concentration camps at Dachau and then Buchenwald, he was released through the efforts of his future wife Dora, and emigrated to the United States. There he continued to publish books and contribute to newspapers before returning to Europe after the Second World War. Ill health, aggravated by his experiences in the camps, dogged him in later life, but he continued to publish through to the end of the 1950s. He wrote also under the pen names Henry E. Jacob and Eric Jens Petersen.

== Early life ==
Jacob, originally named Henry Edward Jacob, was born in Friedrichstadt, a district of Berlin, the son of bank director and newspaper publisher Richard Jacob (1847–1899) and his wife Martha (née Behrendt), the daughter of a landed family. The couple divorced in 1895 and Martha was remarried, to the Viennese banker Edmund Lampl, in the same year.

== Career ==
=== Youth, education, and first job ===
Jacob was raised alongside his older brother Robert (1883–1924) and younger half-sister Alice Lampl (1898–1938) in an intellectual German-Jewish household. Jacob attended Gymnasium schools in Berlin and Vienna, obtaining his Abitur (high school exam) from the Ascanian high school in Berlin, under the tutelage of the noted philosopher Otto Friedrich Gruppe. He enrolled at the Frederick William University (today the Humboldt University of Berlin) to study literature, history, music, and Germanistics. At college he became friends with the Expressionist Georg Heym, and gained his first journalistic job – as a theatre critic for the Deutschen Montagszeitung.

=== Weimar Republic ===
For twenty years, Jacob worked as a journalist and feature writer, also publishing a number of novels, short story collections, and plays. In September and October 1926, he served as a delegate to the International Film Congress in Paris, an event at which a number of anti-Semitic propaganda films were promoted. Jacob reproduced the experience later in his novel Blut und Zelluloid. During the period he earned a reputation as a talented and prolific author, publishing in fields as diverse as news journalism, biography (especially of German composers), dramatic works, fiction, and cultural history.

=== Third Reich, concentration camps, and emigration ===
Following the rise to power of the Nazi Party and the promulgation of laws restricting the freedoms of Jews, Jacob lost his job as a journalist at the Berliner Tageblatt in March 1933. He sought now to make a living as a freelance writer in Vienna, concentrating his efforts on biographies and non-fiction. At the 11th international congress of the literary organization P.E.N., held in Dubrovnik, Jacob joined fellow writers Raoul Auernheimer and Paul Frischaue in vocal opposition to Nazism, and contributed to the fracturing of the Austrian chapter of P.E.N. His books were banned under the Nazi regime, but remained in print via Swiss and Dutch exile publishers.

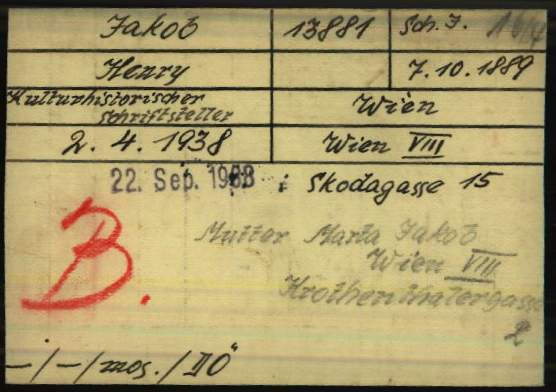
Registration card of Heinrich Eduard Jacob as a prisoner at Dachau Nazi Concentration Camp

Following the annexation of Austria, Jacob was arrested on 22 March 1938. All of his belongings, including his library and private correspondence, were confiscated, and Jacob was included in the first so-called "celebrity transport" of prisoners to the concentration camp at Dachau. He remained there until 23 September 1938, when he was transferred to Buchenwald.

Jacob's future wife, Dora Angel-Soyka, succeeded through the exercise of extraordinary effort in having Jacob released from Buchenwald. The sister of the Austrian poet Ernest Angel, and former wife of the writer Otto Soyka, she enlisted the help of Jacob's American uncle Michael J. Barnes in securing his release on 10 January 1939. Jacob and Angel-Soyka were married on 18 February 1939 and immediately left Germany, via the United Kingdom, for New York.

=== US, return to Germany, and death ===
In the United States, Jacob resumed his writing career, contributing both to German-language periodicals including the Jewish weekly Aufbau and to the New York Times. He wrote a book on the history of bread: Six Thousand Years of Bread in German. It was translated in English by Richard and Clara Winston and published in 1944 by Doubleday. He published further works of non-fiction, now in English, and gained American citizenship on 28 February 1945. Following the end of the war, he returned to Europe in summer 1953, but did not settle permanently, moving frequently between hotels and boarding houses with his wife. His health, severely damaged by his internment, declined, and from 1959 he produced no further literary works.

Jacob died in 1967 and is buried, with his wife, in a Jewish cemetery in Berlin.

== Critical reception ==
Jacob's work is the subject of analyses and criticism by a number of scholars of literary history. Writing in 2005, Isolde Mozer identified a mystical thread in his work despite its modernity. She characterized Jacob's thematic use of Kabbalist elements as an effort to find a solution to the crisis of modernity.

Jens-Erik Hohmann argued in a 2006 monograph on Jacob that the author's career represents a component of the history of Germany as a whole – as an account of a human and an artist attempting both to survive and remain part of the thread of history in a turbulent time.

== See also ==
- Walter Benjamin
- Hannah Arendt
