= Sedov =

Sedov may refer to:

- STS Sedov, a sail training ship
- Sedov (surname)
- Georgiy Sedov (icebreaker)
- 2785 Sedov, an asteroid
- Cape Sedov, an Antarctic ice cape
- Sedov Archipelago
- Sedov, Volgograd Oblast
