= Sedov (surname) =

Sedov (masculine, Russian: Седов) or Sedova (feminine, Russian: Седова) is a Russian surname. Notable people with the surname include:

- Anastasia Sedova (born 1995), Russian cross-country skier
- Evgeny Sedov, Russian swimmer
- Georgy Sedov (1877–1914), Russian Arctic explorer
- Grigory Sedov
- Lev Sedov (1906–1938), son of Leon Trotsky
- Leonid Sedov (1907–1999), physicist and first chair of space programme
- Maksim Sedov
- Natalia Sedova (1882–1962), the second wife of Leon Trotsky
- Pavel Sedov (born 1982), Russian ice hockey player
- Pyotr Sedov, Russian cross-country skier
- Sergei Sedov (1908–1937), another son of Leon Trotsky
- Valentin Sedov, Russian archeologist
- Vladimir Sedov (weightlifter) (1988–2023), Kazakhstani weightlifter
- Vladimir Sedov (actor) (1928–2009), Soviet and Russian actor
- Vladimir Sedov (scientist) (born 1960), Russian archeologist
- Yuri Sedov

== Fictional characters ==
- Vladimir Sedov, from 1988 Soviet short film Defence Counsel Sedov

== See also ==
- Jana Šedová (born 16 January 1974) is a Slovak snowboarder
