= Zinaida Volkova =

Russian Marxist

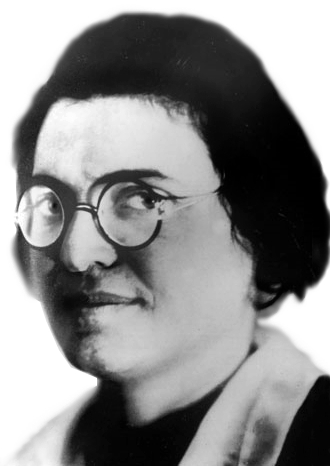
Zinaida Volkova

Zinaida Lvovna Volkova (née Bronstein; Russian: Зинаи́да Льво́вна Во́лкова; 27 March 1901 – 5 January 1933) was a Russian Marxist. She was Leon Trotsky's first daughter by his first wife, Aleksandra Sokolovskaya, a Marxist from Nikolaev (Ukraine). She was raised by her aunt Yelizaveta, sister of Trotsky, after her parents divorced. Her younger sister, Nina, stayed with her mother.

She married twice, and had a daughter by her first husband and a son by her second. Both husbands died during the Great Purges. In January 1931, Volkova was allowed to leave Russia to visit her father in his exile in Turkey, taking only her younger child, her son. She left her daughter in the care of the girl's father, her first husband. Suffering from tuberculosis and depression, and prevented from returning to the Soviet Union, Volkova committed suicide in Berlin in January 1933.

== Biography ==
Bronstein was born in Siberia, where her parents were living in exile at the time. Her sister Nina was born the next year. As a child, she and her younger sister Nina were raised mostly by her paternal grandparents, David and Anna Bronstein. The girls' parents parted ways in 1902 and as revolutionaries, were often traveling or living in hiding. After the Russian Revolution of 1917, Bronstein married Zakhar Borisovich Moglin (1897–1937). They had a daughter, Alexandra Moglina (1923–1989). They divorced in the mid-1920s. Moglin died during the Great Purges, and Alexandra was exiled to Kazakhstan from 1949–56.

Soon after her divorce, she married her second husband, Platon Ivanovich Volkov (1898–1936), a member of the Trotsky-led Left Opposition. The couple had a son, Vsevolod (diminutive Seva, later Esteban), in 1926. Volkov was exiled to Siberia in 1928, but returned in January 1931. Volkova was about to leave Russia for Turkey with their son by that time, to visit her father in his Turkey exile. Volkov was re-arrested in 1935 during the Great Purges and disappeared in the Gulag in 1936. For three months in 1928, Volkova had taken care of her younger sister Nina, while the latter was dying of tuberculosis (TB), then incurable. Nina had married a man with the surname of Nevelson.

In January 1931, Joseph Stalin allowed Volkova to leave the Soviet Union to join her father, Leon Trotsky, in exile. She was allowed to take one family member with her, and she took her son Vsevolod with her, leaving her daughter Alexandra in Russia with the girl's father. On 20 February 1932, the Soviet citizenship of Volkova and Vsevolod was revoked by Stalin, preventing their return to the Soviet Union. The Soviet citizenship of Trotsky, Natalia Sedova and Lev Sedov, were also revoked on the same day.

Suffering from TB and depression, Volkova committed suicide in Berlin on 5 January 1933. She had been under the care of Arthur Kronfeld, a noted Berlin psychotherapist. She also saw Alexandra Ramm-Pfemfert. She was married to Franz Pfemfert, the founder of Die Aktion, a journal of expressionism, and translator of books by Trotsky.

== Descendants ==
Volkova's daughter Alexandra (born 1923) remained in the USSR and lived for a year with her father, Zakhar Moglin. After Moglin was exiled in 1932, she was cared for by her maternal grandmother, Alexandra Sokolovskaya. The latter was exiled in 1935 during the Great Purges and died in the labor camps. Finally, as an adult, Alexandra was also exiled, to Kazakhstan. She survived, returning to Moscow after Stalin's death. She died of cancer in 1989. Not long before she died, her brother Esteban (Vsevolod) finally met his sister again after travelling to the Soviet Union from Mexico, but in tragic circumstances where Alexandra was dying of cancer and also couldn't communicate with her brother, as Esteban had forgotten his Russian and Alexandra spoke no Spanish, English or French. This exact situation was feared by Trotsky himself, who insisted that Vsevolod should learn Russian in the occasion he were ever to re-encounter his family members.

From January to November 1931, Volkova and her son, Vsevolod Volkov (1926-2023) lived with Leon Trotsky and Trotsky's second wife, Natalia Sedova, in Turkey. In November 1931, Volkova obtained permission to go to Germany for treatment for TB, accompanied by her half-brother, Lev Sedov (Trotsky's son by his second wife). Volkova's son stayed behind in Turkey at first. After the removal of the Soviet citizenship of Volkova and Vsevolod on 20 February 1932, the difficulties of Vsevolod being able to move to Germany were multiplied hugely, and he was only able to join his mother in Germany in late December 1932. In the early days of January 1933, Stalin's agents and Kurt von Schleicher's police decided to expel Volkova from Berlin. As Volkova needed treatment for TB, this added to her stress to the point where she committed suicide on 5 January 1933.

After Volkova's death in January 1933, the news of her death was kept from her 6-7-year-old son for nearly a year. Within a month of Volkova's death, Adolf Hitler and the Nazi party came to power in Germany, causing Lev and Vsevolod to flee to Austria, where they lived until the Austrian Civil War of February 1934. After leaving Austria, they moved to France in 1934, and then finally moved to the French capital, Paris, in 1935. After Sedov died in 1938, Sedov's girlfriend, Jeanne Martin, wanted to keep the 12-year-old boy Vsevolod. Trotsky sued for custody and won the case, but Martin then went into hiding with Vsevolod.

Eventually, Trotsky's friends found Martin and Vsevolod, and Vsevolod was sent to Coyoacán, Mexico to live with Trotsky and Natalia Sedova. Vsevolod arrived in Mexico on 8 August 1939, where Trotsky had been living in exile since January 1937. On 24 May 1940, a failed assassination attempt on Trotsky's life by Stalin's agents, led by David Alfaro Siqueiros, saw Vsevolod shot in the foot. On 20 August 1940, Trotsky was assassinated by Stalin's agent, Ramón Mercader. Trotsky died the following day, 21 August 1940, in hospital. After Trotsky's death, the 14-year-old Vsevolod remained in Mexico, initially living with his grandfather's widow, Natalia Sedova.

Vsevolod took the first name of Esteban and went to local schools and then to college, becoming an engineer. Esteban Volkov married and had four daughters. He died on 16 June 2023 in Tepoztlán, Mexico at the age of 97. He was a custodian of the Trotsky museum in Mexico City. Esteban could speak Spanish, French and English, by the time he was a teenager he had forgotten most of the Russian, Turkish and German that he had learned in the first 8 years of his life, and had to converse with his grandfather and step-grandmother in French when he arrived in Mexico.

One of Esteban Volkov's daughters, Nora Volkow, went to medical school in Mexico. A physician, she lives in the United States, where she is the director of the U.S. National Institute on Drug Abuse at the National Institutes of Health in Bethesda, Maryland near Washington, DC.
