= Carl Einstein =

German art historian (1885–1940)

- Born: Karl Einstein; 26 April 1885; Neuwied, Rhineland-Palatinate, Germany
- Died: 5 July 1940 (aged 55); Lestelle-Betharram, Pyrénées-Atlantiques, France
- Other name: Savine Ree Urian
- Spouse: Maria Ramm (m. 1913)
- Parents: Daniel Einstein (father); Sophie Einstein (mother)
- Relatives: Benno Elkan (brother in-law), Alexandra Ramm-Pfemfert (sister in-law), Franz Pfemfert (brother in-law)

Carl Einstein, born Karl Einstein, also known by pseudonym Savine Ree Urian (26 April 1885 – 5 July 1940), was a German writer, art historian, anarchist, and critic.

Regarded as one of the first critics to appreciate the development of Cubism, as well as for his work on African art and influence on the European avant-garde, Einstein was a friend and colleague of such figures as George Grosz, Georges Braque, Pablo Picasso and Daniel-Henry Kahnweiler. His work combined many strands of both political and aesthetic discourse into his writings, addressing both the developing aesthetic of modern art and the political situation in Europe.

Einstein's involvement in social and political life was characterized by communist sympathies and anarchist views. A target of the German right wing during the interwar Weimar period, Einstein left Germany for France in 1928, a half-decade ahead of the rise of Adolf Hitler and the Nazi Party, later taking part in the Spanish Civil War on the side of the Republican forces during the 1930s.

Trapped in southern France following Nazi Germany's defeat of the French Third Republic, Einstein killed himself by jumping from a bridge on 5 July 1940.

== Early life ==
Carl Einstein who was born to a German Jewish family on 26 April 1885, in the Rhineland town of Neuwied. The second child born to Daniel Einstein, an active member of the local Jewish community, and Sophie Einstein, Carl was a year younger than his sister Hedwig, who would become known as a concert pianist and the wife of sculptor Benno Elkan. A third child born to Daniel and Sophie died in 1889. The young Carl Einstein spent much of his youth in Karlsruhe before moving to Berlin to study philosophy and art history in 1903. Originally given the standard German spelling of his first name as "Karl" at birth, he adopted the Latinized spelling "Carl" in the 1900s.

In Berlin he attended the lectures of Georg Simmel and Heinrich Wölfflin but lacking a high school diploma (Abitur) he could not gain a doctorate. In 1907 he visited Paris and learnt of Pablo Picasso, Georges Braque and Juan Gris, as well as other artists. Upon his return he started writing prose and joined the radical circle around Franz Pfemfert and his magazine Die Aktion. This led to the publication of Bebuquin oder die Dilettanten des Wunders in serialised form in Die Aktion in 1912, with a subsequent volume collecting the episodes in a single book. In 1913 he married Maria Ramm, the sister of Alexandra Ramm-Pfemfert and so becoming Franz's brother in law.

== Wartime experience ==
Einstein welcomed the outbreak of war and volunteered for the Imperial German Army. served as a soldier of Imperial Germany in World War I. The majority of his wartime service was spent in German-occupied Belgium. The work carried out by German scholars on Congolese art during the occupation would prove to be considerably helpful in Einstein's later efforts to encourage the beginning of a serious appreciation of black African art by Europeans.

Einstein's life after the First World War was marked by the violent political and social implications of the war and revolutionary sentiment following the Hohenzollern monarchy's collapse. He was actively involved in the short-lived Revolutionary Brussels Soldiers' Council and to a lesser extent in the failed Spartacist Uprising in Berlin and later in the defeated anarchist Durruti Column during the Spanish Civil War.

== Confusion with Albert Einstein ==
Albert Einstein was offered a part-time professorship at Leiden University in 1920. Hendrik Lorentz, one of the people who organised the offer saw it as way of promoting international reconciliation following the First World War. However, when the proposed appointment was passed to the government bureaucracy for approval as University professors were regarded as senior civil servants who required royal approval. However, a Dutch military intelligence report was submitted to the Minister of Education Johannes Theodoor de Visser, which gave an account of Carl Einstein's activities in the 1918 Brussels Soldiers' Council. This caused delays in governmental approval for the appointment. This was accompanied by a number of accounts of Carl's agitational activity during the German Revolution, including Carl's graveside oration after the murder of Rosa Luxemburg, which frequently omitted his first name. It is possible that this confusion led Paul Weyland to coin the phrase "scientific Dadaism". Indeed, Hannah Höch featured the inclusion of the image of Albert Einstein in her collage Schnitt mit dem Küchenmesser. Dada durch die letzte weimarer Bierbauchkulturepoche Deutschlands, which was exhibited in the first International Dada Fair, held in Berlin in 1920.

== Post-war career ==
Einstein established a reputation as a well-known author and art critic on the basis of work ranging from his debut novel Bebuquin oder die Dilettanten des Wunders, to his widely read work on African sculpture Negerplastik (Negro Sculpture, 1915), credited as being one of the first important books acknowledging African art in Europe (and especially its relationship to Cubism). A follow-up volume, Afrikanische Plastik (African Sculptur, 1921), continued this engagement, though later research revealed that several of the featured objects were in fact not of African origin. Other major works include the final volume of the prestigious Propyläen Verlag history of art series Die Kunst des 20. Jahrhunderts (Art of the 20th Century), which may have gained him an invitation to teach at the Bauhaus (he declined), and the notorious play Die Schlimme Botschaft. Another Africa-related book is Afrikanische Märchen und Legenden, a compilation of African mythology in very expressive language. Einstein also worked on numerous journals and collective projects, among some of the more important: Die Aktion edited by Franz Pfemfert, Die Pleite and Der Blutige Ernst with George Grosz, and the legendary journal Documents: Doctrines, Archéologie, Beaux-arts, Ethnographie edited with Georges Bataille.

Einstein's avant-garde orientation and leftist political sympathies made him a marked man for right-wing attacks during the Weimar Republic. His passion play Die Schlimme Botschaft (The Sad Tidings, or The Bad News) was met with attacks as blasphemous; its 1921 publication resulted in a legal process and a conviction for blasphemy in 1922, and Einstein was forced to atone for the revolutionary ideas placed into the mouth of his Jesus Christ with a 15,000-mark fine.

Better received in France, Einstein left Germany for permanent residence in France in 1928; with Adolf Hitler's rise to power in 1933, the exile became permanent and officially mandated. Having met Lyda Guévrékian in 1928, Einstein married her in 1932. The French Cubist painter and sculptor, Georges Braque, served as a witness.

Einstein spent 1936-1938 fighting in the Spanish Civil War; returning to France where in 1940, he was arrested and interned along with the other German émigrés until his liberation later in the spring of 1940 as a result of chaotic circumstances in the face of the rapidly progressing German invasion. Although able to escape the German occupation of Paris during the Fall of France and flee to the south, he was left trapped on the French border with Francoist Spain.

Seeing no alternatives, Einstein committed suicide in the Pyrenees town of Lestelle-Betharram on 5 July 1940.

== See also ==
- Anarchism in Germany

== Works ==
- Bebuquin oder die Dilettanten des Wunders. Ein Roman. Berlin: Verlag der Wochenschrift Die Aktion, 1912.
- Neue Blätter. Berlin: Baron, 1912.
- Wilhelm Lehmbrucks graphisches Werk. Berlin: Cassirer, 1913.
- Negerplastik. Leipzig: Verlag der weißen Bücher, 1915. Internet Archive.
- Der Unentwegte Platoniker. Leipzig: Wolff, 1918.
- Afrikanische Plastik. Berlin: Wasmuth 1921 (Orbis pictus, Weltkunst-Bücherei; 7).
- Die schlimme Botschaft. Berlin: Rowohlt, 1921.
- Der frühere japanische Holzschnitt. Berlin: Wasmuth 1922 (Orbis pictus, Weltkunst-Bücherei; 16).
- Afrikanische Märchen und Legenden; herausgegeben von Carl Einstaein, Rowohlt, 1925. Neuausgabe (1980) MEDUSA Verlag Wölk + Schmid, Berlin.
- African Legends, First english edition, Pandavia, Berlin 2021. ISBN 9783753155821
- Die Kunst des 20. Jahrhunderts. Berlin: Propyläen, 1926. (Propyläen-Kunstgeschichte; 16).
- Entwurf einer Landschaft. Paris: Kahnweiler, 1930.
- Giorgio de Chirico. Berlin: Galerie Flechtheim, 1930.
- Die Kunst des XX. Jahrhunderts. Berlin: Propyläen, 1931.
- Georges Braque. Paris: Editions des chroniques du jour. London: Zwemmer. New York: E. Weyhe, 1934.

== As editor ==
In 1919, along with George Grosz, he edited the magazine Der blutige Ernst (the title is a pun on "Bloody Ernest" / "Bloody Earnest"), which was published by Trianon Verlag, Berlin

== Collected editions ==
- Gesammelte Werke. Herausgegeben von Ernst Nef. Wiesbaden: Limes, 1962.
- Carl Einstein. Die Fabrikation der Fiktionen, Gesammelte Werke in Einzelausgaben, Sibylle Penkert (ed.), Reinbek b. Hamburg, Rowohlt, 1973.
- Werke. 3 Bände, Berlin: Medusa, 1980-1985.
- Bebuquin oder Die Dilettanten des Wunders. Prosa und Schriften 1906-1929. Published by Hermann Haarmann and Klaus Siebenhaar. Leipzig, Weimar: Kiepenheuer, 1989.
- Werke. Berliner Ausgabe. Published by Hermann Haarmann and Klaus Siebenhaar. 6 volumes, Berlin: Fannei & Walz, 1992-1996.
