= Siebenhaar =

Siebenhaar is a German language surname. It is a nickname for a person with sparse hair growth– and may refer to:

- Alex Siebenhaar (1927–2022), Swiss rower
- Klaus Siebenhaar (1952), German university lecturer, publisher and cultural manag
- Toni Siebenhaar (1923–2000), German rower
- Willem Siebenhaar (1863–1936), social activist and writer in Western Australia
