= Nadezhda Joffe =

Soviet Trotskyist and Adolph Joffe's daughter

- Надежда Иоффе
- Born: Nadezhda Adolfovna Joffe; Надежда Адольфовна Иоффе; 14 May 1906; Berlin, Kingdom of Prussia, German Empire
- Died: 18 March 1999 (aged 92); New York City, New York, USA
- Spouse: Pavel Kossakovsky (died 1938)
- Children: 4
- Father: Adolph Joffe

Nadezhda Joffe (Russian: Надежда Иоффе) (14 May 1906 – 18 March 1999) was a Soviet writer, gulag survivor, Trotskyist and member of Left Opposition.

== Life and career ==
Nadezhda Adolfovna Joffe (Russian: Надежда Адольфовна Иоффе) was born on 14 May 1906 in Berlin to Berta Ilyinichna Joffe (née Tsypkina, later Ostrovskaya) and Adolph Joffe, a Bolshevik politician and Soviet diplomat. Through her father Joffe was of Karaite descent.

Joffe joined the Trotskyist Left Opposition within the Soviet Communist Party shortly after it was formed in 1923 and was first exiled from Moscow in 1929. Until Trotsky's exile, Joffe was a close friend of Lev Sedov. She was re-arrested at the beginning of the Great Purge in 1936, and sent to Kolyma labor camps in Siberia, where her first husband, Trotskyist Pavel Kossakovsky, was killed in 1938. She was the last person to see Leon Trotsky's first wife, Aleksandra Sokolovskaya, alive in Kolyma in 1938.

After Stalin's death in 1953, Joffe's sentence was annulled and she returned to Moscow in 1956. She wrote a book of memoirs, Back in Time: My Life, My Fate, My Epoch in 1971–72, which was first published in Moscow after the dissolution of the Soviet Union in 1992.

Her family emigrated to the United States at the end of her life and she settled in Brooklyn, New York, where she worked on her father's biography and his letters until her death in 1999, aged 92, collaborating with Iskra Research publishing house.
