= Cimetière parisien de Thiais =

Cemetery in Thiais, Paris, France

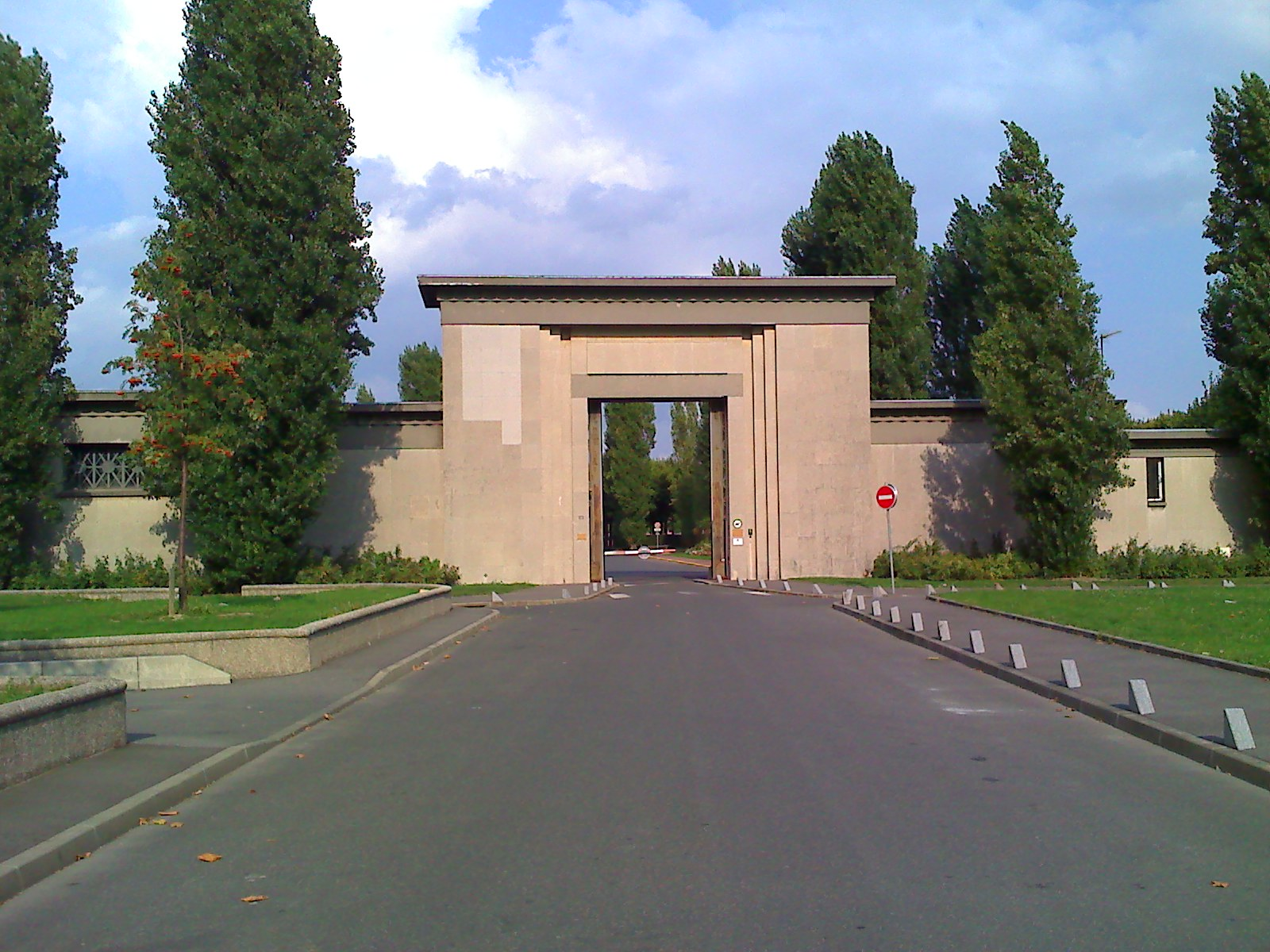
- Entrance of the Cimetière parisien de Thiais
- Interactive map of Cimetière parisien de Thiais

Details
- Established: 1929
- Location: Thiais
- Coordinates: 48.763°N 2.375°E
- Type: Public (non-denominational)
- Owned by: Mairie de Paris
- Size: 103 hectares (250 acres)
- No. of graves: 150,000

The cimetière parisien de Thiais is one of three Parisian cemeteries extra muros, and is located in the commune of Thiais, in the Val-de-Marne department, in the Île-de-France region.

== History ==
The cemetery was opened in October 1929 and is therefore the newest of the three Parisian cemeteries extra muros, the others being the cimetière parisien de Bagneux and the cimetière parisien de Pantin. It is now a cosmopolitan cemetery, where many faiths are represented.

== Size ==
Thiais is the second largest Parisian cemetery. Only Pantin is larger. There are about 6,000 trees. The cemetery is divided into 123 numbered divisions in which there are an estimated 150,000 graves. Because the cemetery is so large, people with a walking disability can be driven around.

== Notable burials ==
- In divisions 48 through 55 there are Jardins de la Fraternité which are meant for burial of those in Paris who could not afford burial or who could not be identified. Because of this it has the reputation of being the "Cemetery of the poor and penniless".
- Ashes of the dead who donated their body to science are scattered in Division 102, where several stelae stand in their memory.
- Division 94 is reserved for stillbirths.
- There are military sections in divisions 1 and 17.

There are also a number of memorials:

- Monument for the French resistance (1942) (division 7)
- The Ermenonville crash in 1974 (division 16)
- The Paris-Brazzaville crash in 1961 (division 22)
- Monument for the Policier auxiliaires, persons who have chosen to do their national service in the French national police force (division 25)
- Monument for French Indochina solidarity (division 36)
- Monuments for Génie de la Terre (Chinese protective deities) (division 36 and 44)

Individual burials. Many of the graves have been cleared after the concession expired.

- Jean-Marie Bastien-Thiry, French Air Force lieutenant-colonel, sentenced to death by court martial, he was the last French person to be executed by firing squad, later reburied in the cemetery of Bourg-la-Reine
- André Berley, French actor
- Francisco Boix-Campo, Spanish republican and survivor of Mauthausen
- Marcel Bucard, French fascist politician
- Jean Cassou, French writer, art critic, poet and member of the French Resistance during World War II
- Georges Catroux, French army general
- Paul Celan, Romanian poet and translator, with his wife Gisèle Lestrange
- Jean-Paul Le Chanois, French film director, screenwriter and actor
- André Deed, French-born actor and director
- Lise Delamare, French actress
- Jean-Luc Delarue, French television presenter and producer
- Beauford Delaney, American modernist painter
- Eugénie Fougère, French vaudeville and music hall dancer and singer
- Kurt Gerstein, German SS-officer
- Étienne Hajdú, Transylvania-born French sculptor of Jewish descent and resistance fighter
- Jean Hérold-Paquis, French journalist who fought for Franco and the Nationalists during the Spanish Civil War
- Catherine Hessling, French actress
- Loumia Hiridjee, French businesswoman (Princesse Tam Tam)
- Lazare Kopelmanas, international jurist and diplomat
- Pierre Laval, French Prime Minister under the Third Republic and Vichy regime was initially buried there after his execution before being removed to the Chambrun family vault in Montparnasse Cemetery.
- Gina Manès, Silent movie star
- Daniel Mayer, French politician (donated his body to science)
- Pascal Mazzotti, French actor, remains transferred to Biarritz
- Farhad Mehrad, Award winning Iranian rock singer, songwriter, guitarist, pianist. In Iran known as Farhad. Burial place of ashes.
- Gérald Neveu, French poet
- Antonieta Rivas Mercado, Mexican writer transferred to Jardins de la Fraternité.
- Alice Prin, better known as Kiki or The Queen of Montparnasse, grave was cleared in 1974
- Albert Raisner, French harmonica player, TV and radio host and producer
- Joseph Roth, Austrian-Jewish journalist and novelist
- Han Ryner, French individualist anarchist philosopher and activist and a novelist
- Lev Sedov, son of Léon Trotsky and his second wife Natalia Sedova, activist in the Trotskyist movement
- Madeleine Sologne, French actress
- Franz Stock, first German theology student in France since the Middle Ages, his remains were transferred to the church of Saint-Jean-Baptiste de Rechèvres in Chartres in June 1963
- Yevgeny Zamyatin, Russian author of science fiction and political satire
- Zog of Albania, former president, prime minister and king of Albania (his remains were repatriated to Albania in 2012).
- Mahmoud Shehabi Khorassani, Iranian philosopher, jurist, supreme judge, author and professor, buried in the 101st division, row 16.

== Location ==
Located in the banlieue southwest of the city of Paris, France, the main entrance to the Cimetière de Thiais is located at 261 Route de Fontainebleau, in Thiais, near the junction with Avenue de la Republique. There is also a smaller entrance: Porte Est on Avenue de Général de Gaulle.

The inhabitants of Thiais are buried in the communal cemetery just off Avenue Général de Gaulle, near Espace des 4 Saisons.

== Public transport ==
The cimetière de Thiais is a short walk from the Villejuif – Louis Aragon métro station, which can be reached by taking line 7. The nearest railway station is Pont de Rungis – Aéroport d'Orly which is served by line C, although it is not close by.

The cimetière de Thiais is also served by bus lines 185, 192, 285 and 396.

There is a Vélib' station at Avenue de Fontainebleau (42703).

== Gallery ==
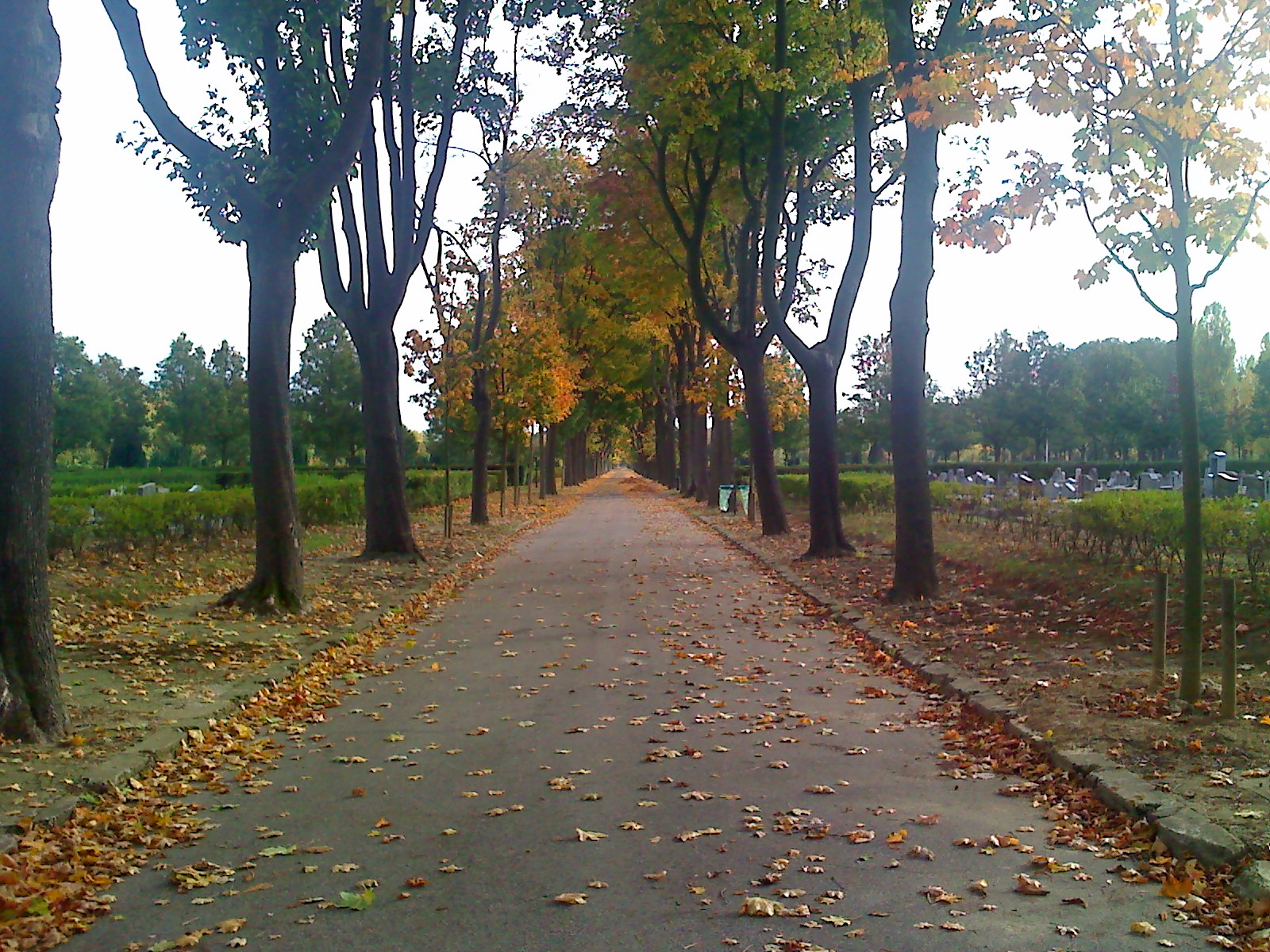
Avenue O

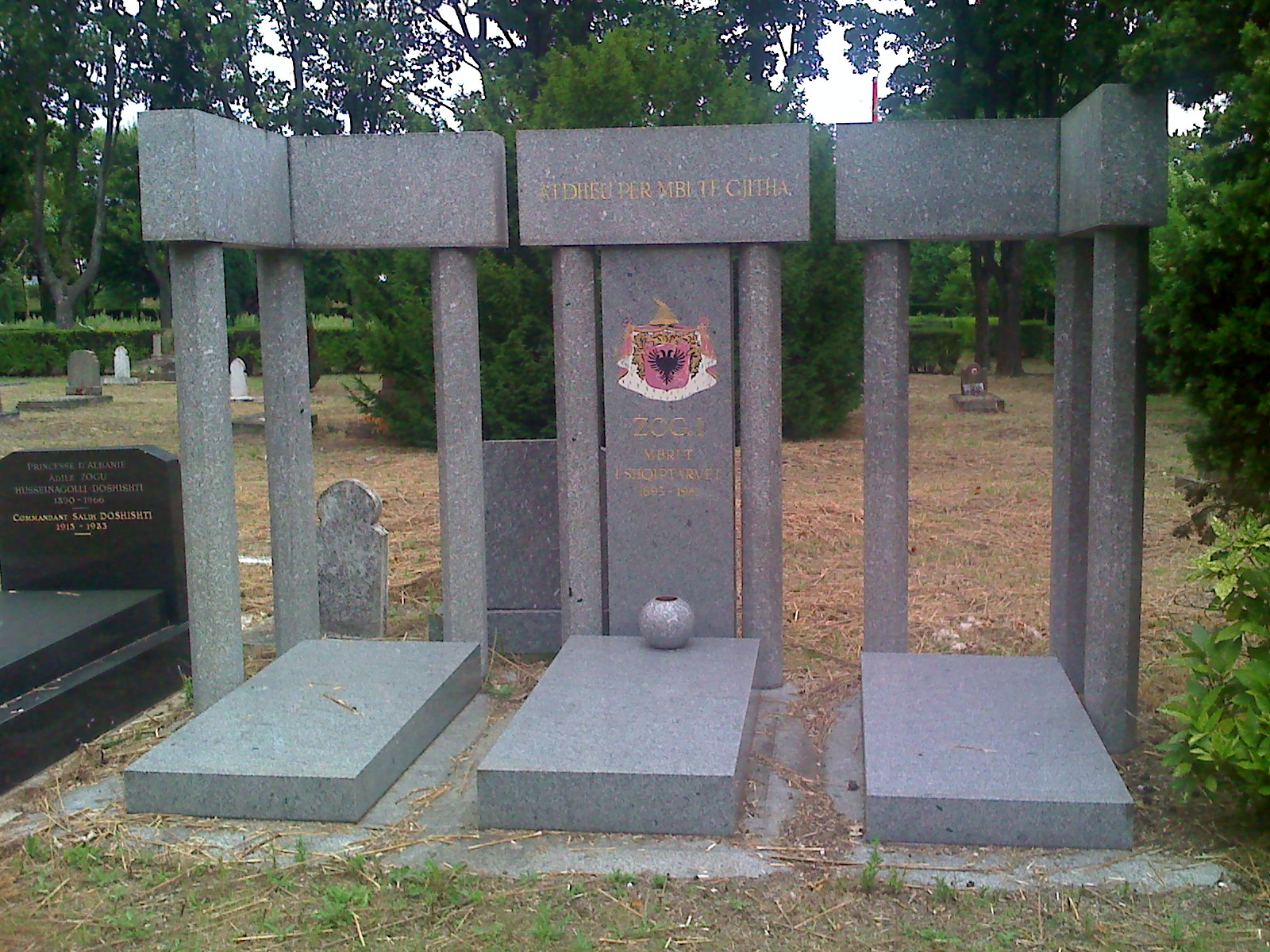
The former grave of Zog of Albania

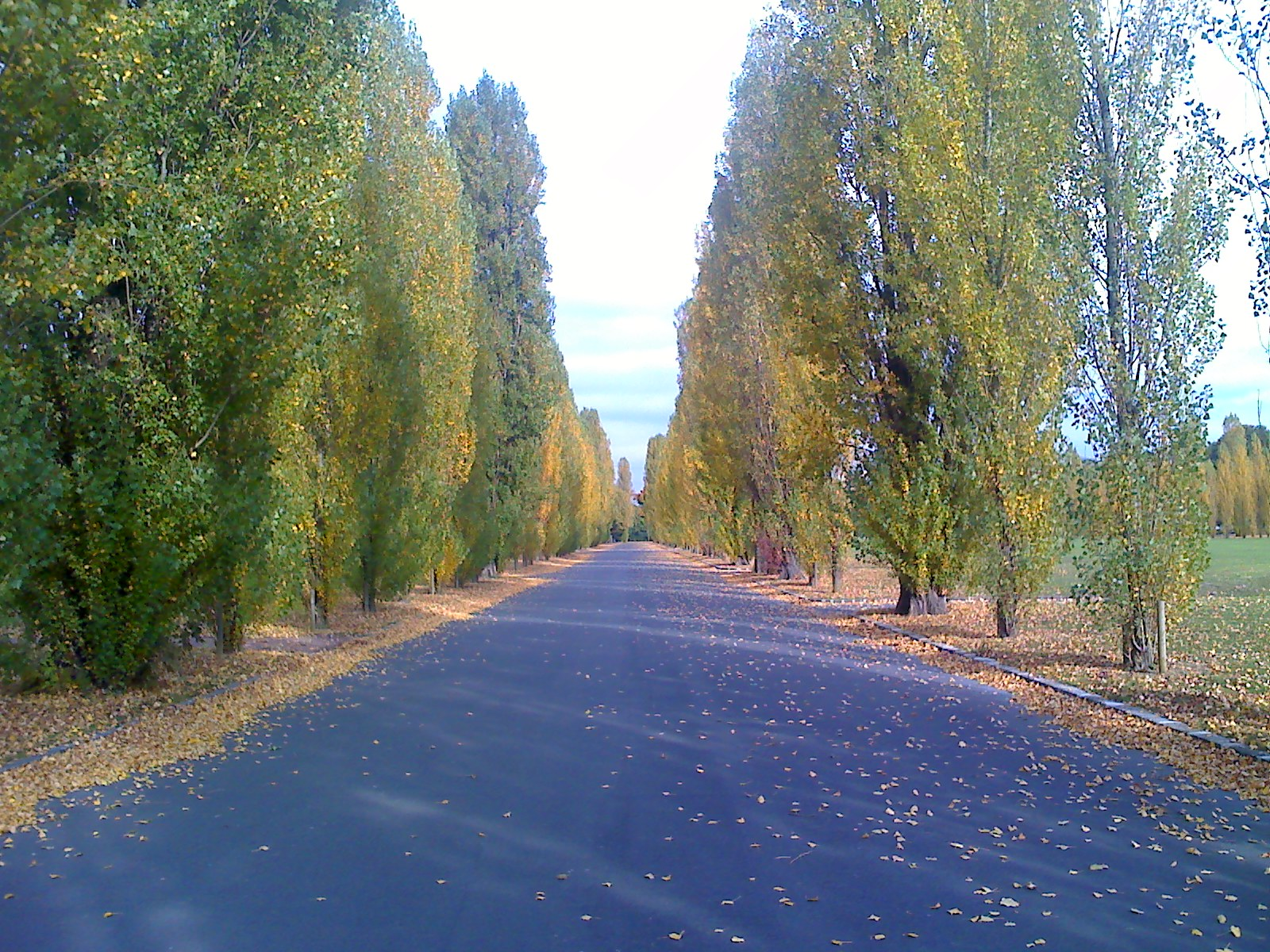
Avenue Principale

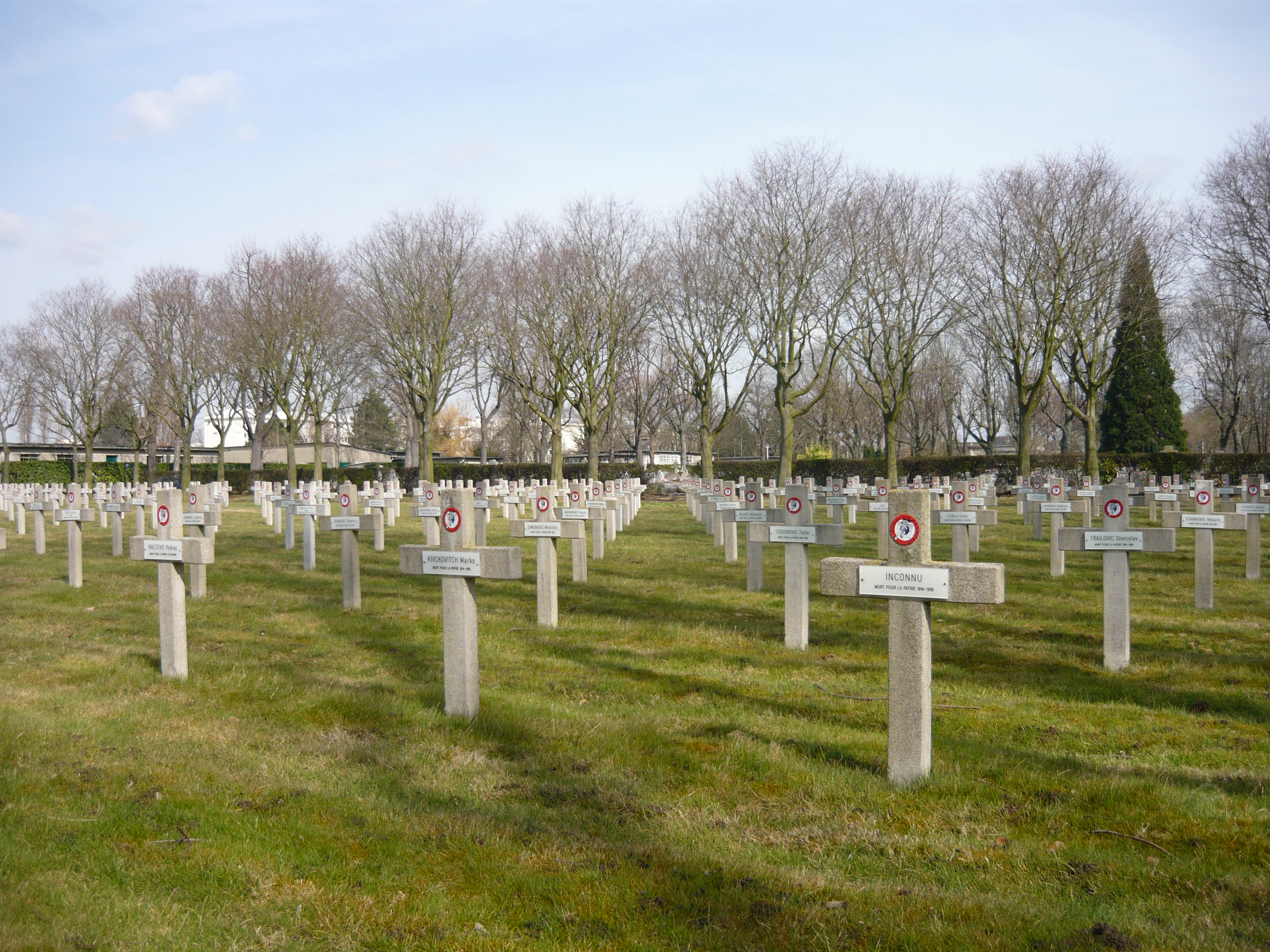
The Serbian military section of the cemetery
