= Lazare Kopelmanas =

French lawyer (1907–1980)

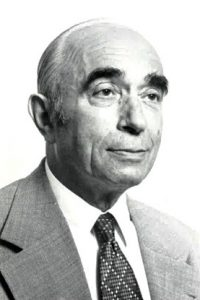
- Kopelmanas in 1976
- Born: Lazar Simkhovich Kopelman; July 14, 1907; Kovna, Kovno Governorate, Russian Empire (now Lithuania)
- Died: December 9, 1980 (aged 73); Paris, France
- Spouse: Eta Isaakovna Finkelshtein (m. 1930)
- Relatives: Moisiejus Kopelmanas (brother)

Lazare Kopelmanas (born 14 July [O.S. 1 July] 1907 in Kovna, Russian Empire; died December 9, 1980, in Paris, France) was an international jurist and diplomat.

== Biography ==
After obtaining his candidate's degree in economic and social sciences at the University of Geneva in 1929 and serving in Lithuanian Army next year, he went to the University of Paris in 1931 to study law. Shortly after his graduation in 1935, he began to teach at its Institut des hautes études internationales and became professor in 1939. Later that same year he volunteered into the French army. During the German invasion of France in 1940, he was taken prisoner and interned in Stalag VII-A. After liberation he came back to the University of Paris, where his doctoral dissertation earned him Prix de thèse for the year 1945. From 1949 to 1961 he was Legal Adviser to the United Nations Economic Commission for Europe (UNECE), and from 1961 to 1977 – adviser to the United Nations Office at Geneva in matters concerning legal aspects of trade, industry and technology transfer.

In different post-war years Kopelmanas lectured at the Centre d'Études de Politique Éntrangère (1948, 1950), The Hague Academy of International Law (1950, 1976), Yale University (Visiting professor in 1957–1958), University of Geneva (Associate Professor in 1971–1975), University of Paris (1945–1948, 1960–1962, 1977).

== Other positions ==
- “Secrétaire de la rédaction” of the Revue générale de droit international public (1937–1939).
- Counsel for France before the International Court of Justice in the 1948 Admission of a state to the United Nations case.
- “Maître de recherches” at the Centre national de la recherche scientifique (Paris, 1945–1950).
- Deputy Rapporteur of the Study Committee of the First and Second Conferences of Non-Governmental Consultative Organizations (Geneva, 1948–1949).
- Expert representing the United Nations at the First General Assembly of the International Council for Building Documentation (Paris, October 23–28, 1950).
- Observer representing UNECE at the Fifth Conference for the Revision of the International Conventions concerning the Carriage of Goods by Rail (CIM) and of Passengers and Luggage by Rail (CIV) (Berne, October 15–25, 1952).
- Observer representing the United Nations at the 1955–1956 Geneva Round of General Agreement on Tariffs and Trade negotiations.
- Representative of the United Nations at the First (Barcelona, September 17–20, 1956) and Second (Rome, October 11–15, 1959) Meetings of the Organizations concerned with the Unification of Law.
- Executive Secretary of the Special Meeting of Plenipotentiaries convened for the purpose of negotiating and signing the European Convention on International Commercial Arbitration (Geneva, April 10–21, 1961).
- Member of the International Council for Commercial Arbitration (1969–1977).

== Bibliography ==
- L'article XI du Pacte de la Société des Nations, 42 Revue générale de droit international public (1935).
- Quelques réflexions au sujet de l'article 38, 3° du Statut de la Cour Permanente de Justice Internationale, 43 Revue générale de droit international public (1936).
- Compatibilité de certains décrets lois dantzikois avec la Constitution de la Ville Libre / A propos de l'avis consultatif de la C.P.J.I. du 4 Décembre 1935, 43 Revue générale de droit international public (1936).
- Du conflit entre le traité international et la loi interne: quelques remarques au sujet des rapports du droit interne et du droit international, Revue de droit international et de législation comparée, 3e série, vol. XVIII, № 1, № 2 (1937).
- Custom as a means of the creation of international law, 18 British yearbook of international law (1937).
- The problem of aggression and the prevention of war, 31 American journal of international law (1937–2). JSTOR 2190523
- De l'ordre juridique déterminant les autorités compétentes pour conclure les traités internationaux. Thèse, Paris, Dactylographié, 1945.
- L’Organisation des Nations Unies. Paris: Recueil Sirey, 1947.
- L'évolution de l'O.N.U., 13 Politique étrangère (1948-V, VI).
- Rapport sur le statut juridique des organisations internationales non-gouvernementales (1949).
- Le contrôle international, 77 Recueil des cours / Académie de droit international (1950–II).
- La codification des coutumes du commerce international dans le cadre des commissions régionales des Nations Unies, 1 Annuaire français de droit international (1955).
- La reconnaissance en droit international, IX Comunicazioni e studi (1957).
- La pensée de Georges Scelle et ses possibilités d'application à quelques problèmes récents de droit international, 88 Journal du droit international (Clunet), (1960-II).
- La place de la convention européenne sur l'arbitrage commercial international du 21 avril 1961 dans l'evolution du droit international de l'arbitrage, 7 Annuaire français de droit international (1961).
- Le rôle des règlements d'arbitrage dans le développement des procédures arbitrales applicables au règlement de litiges commerciaux à caractère international, 21 Annuaire français de droit international (1975).
- L'application du droit national aux sociétés multinationales, 150 Recueil des cours / Académie de droit international (1976–II).

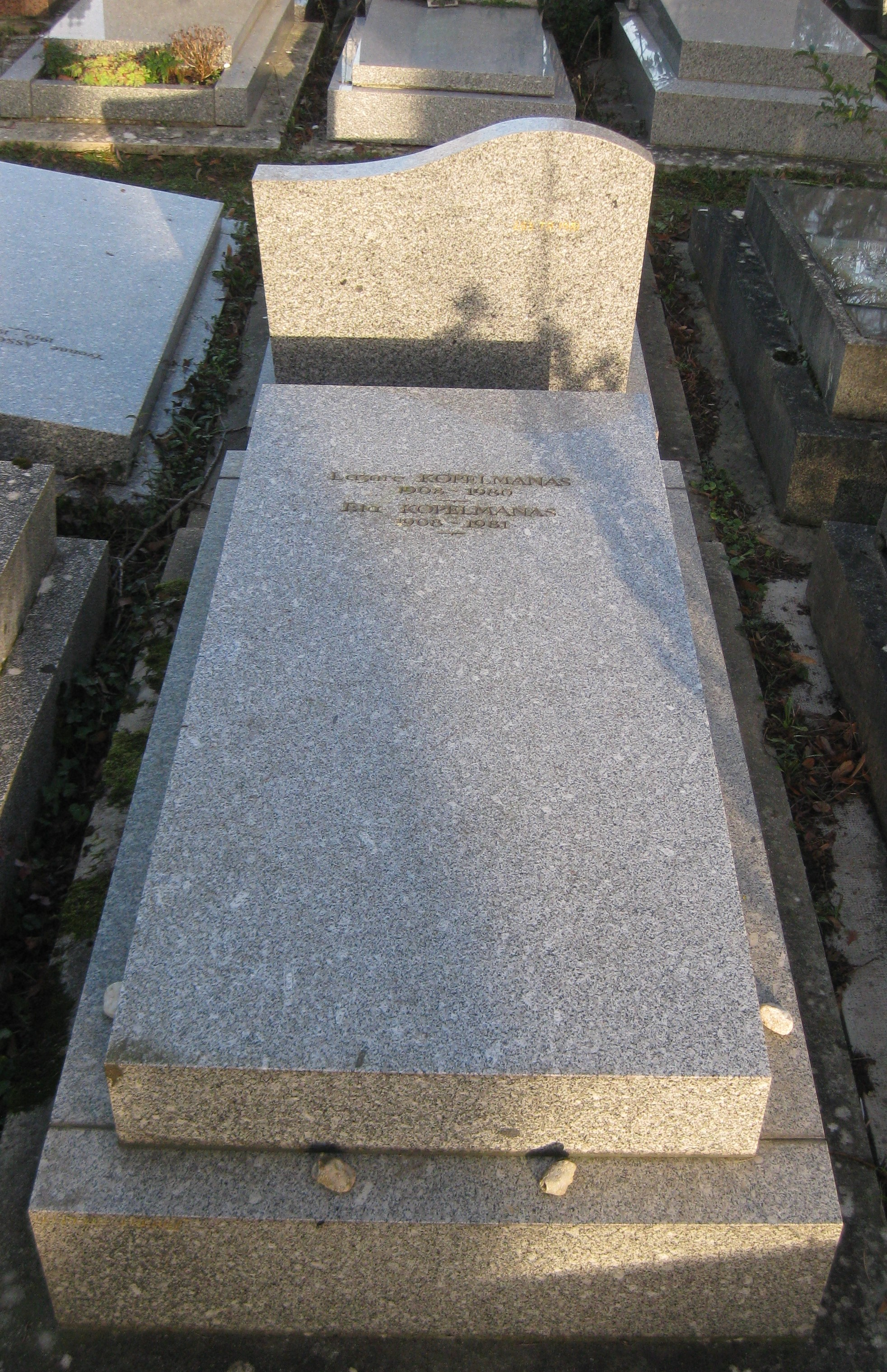
The grave of Lazare Kopelmanas at Cimetière parisien de Thiais
