= Aleksandra Sokolovskaya =

First wife of Leon Trotsky

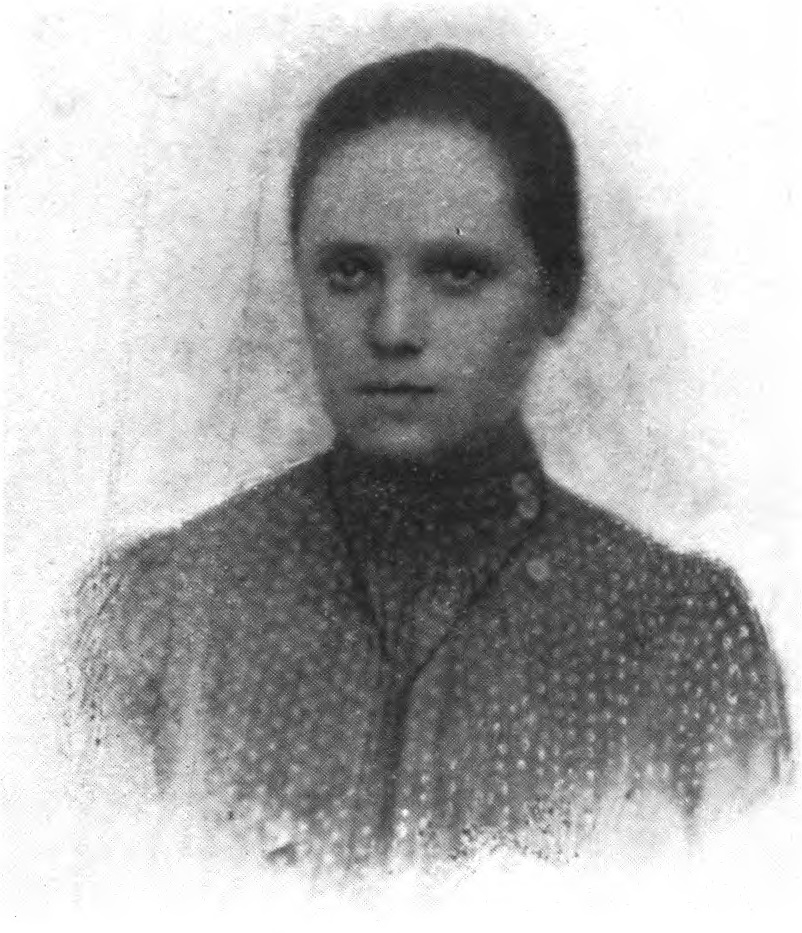
Sokolovskaya in 1902

Aleksandra Lvovna Sokolovskaya (Russian: Александра Львовна Соколовская; 1872 – 29 April 1938) was a Russian Marxist revolutionary and Leon Trotsky's first wife. She died in the Great Purges no earlier than 1938.

== Biography ==
=== Early life and family (1879–1895) ===
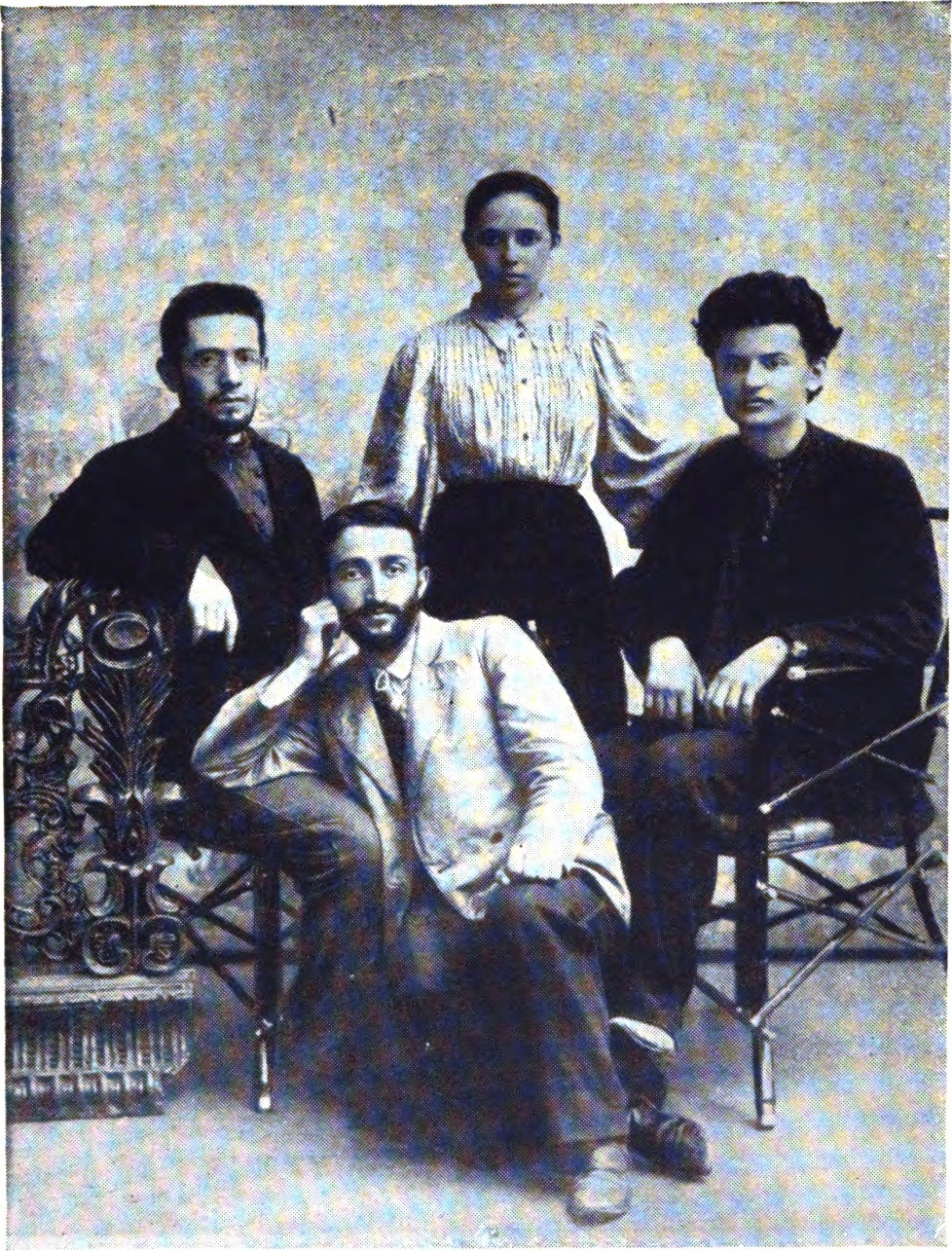
Sokolovskaya with her brother Ilya Sokolovsky (left), Trotsky (right) and Dr. Grigory Ziv c. 1897

Sokolovskaya's father, Lev Sokolovsky, was a Narodnik, who encouraged his children to side with the revolutionaries. Aleksandra became a Marxist as a student at Odessa University. In 1896, she joined a narodnik group in Nikolaev, organised by a gardener named Franz Shvigovsky, who also recruited the 16 year old Leon Bronstein, who later took the name Trotsky. Sokolovskaya was the only Marxist in the group: all the others were narodniks, including Bronstein, who was "Sokolovskaya's most bitter antagonist"

=== South Russian Workers' Union ===
In 1897, Sokolovskaya and her brothers, Ilya and Gregori, founded the South Russian Workers' Union in Nikolayev, which Bronstein also joined. By then, Bronstein had converted to Marxism. They recruited about 200 factory and dock workers, before the organisers were arrested in January 1898. Having been moved through several prisons, Sokolovskaya and Bronstein were married – against opposition from his parents – by a Jewish chaplain in Moscow prison in 1900. They were deported together to Ust-Kut in eastern Siberia. Trotsky later wrote:

Alexandra Lvovna had one of the most important positions in the South Russian Workers' Union. Her utter loyalty to socialism and her complete lack of any personal ambition gave her an unquestioned moral authority. The work that we were doing bound us closely together, and so, to avoid being separated, we had married in the transfer prison in Moscow.

=== Exile life ===
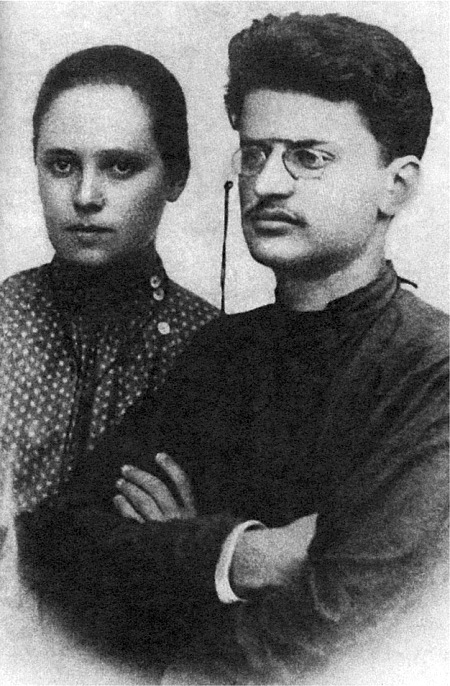
Sokolovskaya and Trotsky sometime before Trotsky's escape from exile, summer 1902

They had two daughters, Zinaida Volkova (1901–1933) and Nina Nevelson (1902–1928), both of whom predeceased their parents. In his autobiography, Trotsky wrote that when he considered escaping from Siberia (alone, of necessity) in the summer of 1902, despite their younger daughter being only four months old, Sokolovskaya told him "you must", because "duty to the revolution overshadowed everything else for her, personal considerations especially."

=== Russian revolutions and later ===
She remained in exile until the 1905 Revolution, when she was briefly free, but she was deported again after its suppression. Their daughters were mostly raised by David and Anna Bronstein, Trotsky's wealthy parents, in Yanovka. She was finally freed by the February Revolution of 1917, after a period of prison and exile stretching over 19 years, and was able to live in Petrograd with her daughters, who were now in their teens. She was a founder of Komsomol, in Petrograd, and edited the city's Komsomol newspaper for 16 years. She also worked in the People's Commissariat for Education. She raised her two grandchildren after Nina Nevelson died of tuberculosis in June 1928, soon after her husband was deported as a Trotskyist. She was also an active supporter of the Left Opposition. According to the French Trotskyist, Victor Serge she "usually took the chair at our meetings. Plump, her white hair over her kindly face, Alexandra Lvovna Bronstein was the last word in common sense and honesty." Serge claimed that by the beginning of 1928, he and Sokolovskaya were the only known oppositionists in Leningrad still at liberty.

=== Great Purge and death ===
In January 1933, her older daughter, Zinaida, who had been allowed to go abroad to join her father, committed suicide. On learning of her death, Sokolovskaya wrote Trotsky a letter reproaching him for his coldness. "All this comes from your character, from the fact that you find it so difficult to show your feelings ... you, her father, could have saved her." She took over care of Zinaida's daughter, but early in 1935 she was arrested, following the assassination of Sergei Kirov. She was last seen in a Kolyma labor camp by Nadezhda Joffe, Adolph Joffe's daughter. She was shot probably on 29 April 1938.

Aleksandra Sokolovskaya was posthumously rehabilitated on 7 March 1990.
