= Mahmoud Shehabi Khorassani =

Iranian judge and professor

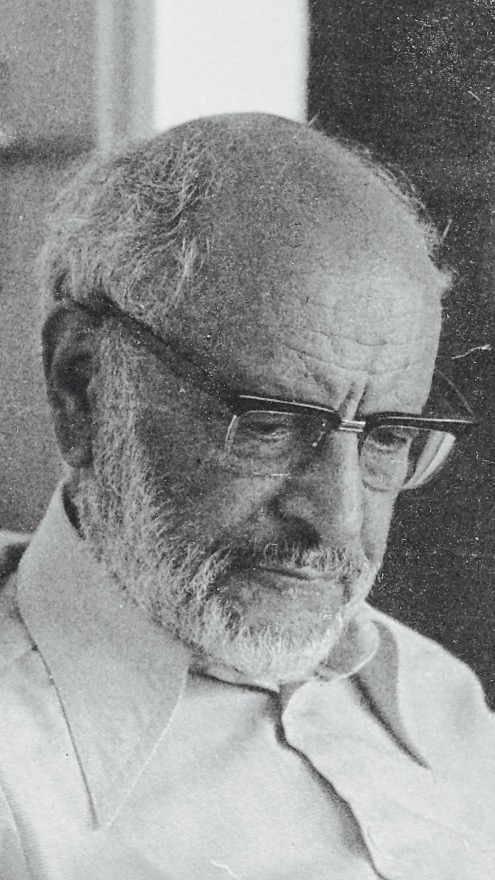
- 1982 Mulhouse, France
- Born: 26 July 1903; Torbat-e-Heydarieh, Iran
- Died: 26 July 1986 (aged 82); Mulhouse, France
- Education: Iranian philosophy, Logic, Doctrine of Jurisprudence, Poetry, Literature,
- Occupation(s): professor emeritus at the law School, University of Tehran, Iran
- Spouse: Razieh Shehabi 'Sadidi'
- Children: 3

Notes
- Main books: Leader of Wisdom and Periods of Jurisprudence

Mahmoud Shehabi Khorassani (Persian: محمود شهابی خراسانی, French: Mahmoud Chehabi Khorassani) was a lawyer, philosopher, jurist, and a professor emeritus at the University of Tehran in the Pahlavi dynasty era. He was well versed in diverse fields such as logic, doctrine of jurisprudence, philosophy, poetry, literature, and spirituality.

== Early years and education ==
Mahmoud Shehabi was born on 26 July 1903, in the town of Torbat-e Heydarieh in Iran. His father, Abd al-Salam, poet and the author of a few books, including The Secret of Love and Hidden Treasure. His maternal ancestors are the descendants of Qutb ad-Dīn Haydar a Sufi mystic, founder of Torbat-e Heydarieh, son of Salour Khan Uzbek, king of Bukhara. At the age of 11, he left his hometown to study in Mashhad, Isfahan and finally in Tehran, and remained in this city.

== Career ==
In Tehran he first taught rational and movable sciences at the Sepahsalar High School whose name was changed to Shahid Motahari University after the Iranian revolution of 1979. In 1933, he was appointed as professor of law, and later professor emeritus in the Faculty of Law of Tehran, where he taught law at the doctoral level, He also taught law at the Military academy and Police academy. He was a member of Tehran University's High Council, a member of the supreme council of culture, and member of the Iranian Imperial Academy of Philosophy for several times. At the request of Dr. Mohammad Hedayati, then Minister of Justice, he was appointed Supreme Judge of the Courts for a time.

== Personal life ==
His wife was born in Tehran, in 1907, the daughter of Doctor Abul Hassan Khan, a physician known as 'Motamedol Ateba' (The Trusted Physician). She was part of the first group of women who (in Iran) attended high school at that period and earned a high level of diversified education. On her mother's side, she belonged to the Qajar dynasty. She authored a few books, including a self-awareness book titled, "knowing-self to Know God". Shehabi and his wife had three children, one girl, Mahvash, and two boys, Massoud and Mansour.

== Works ==
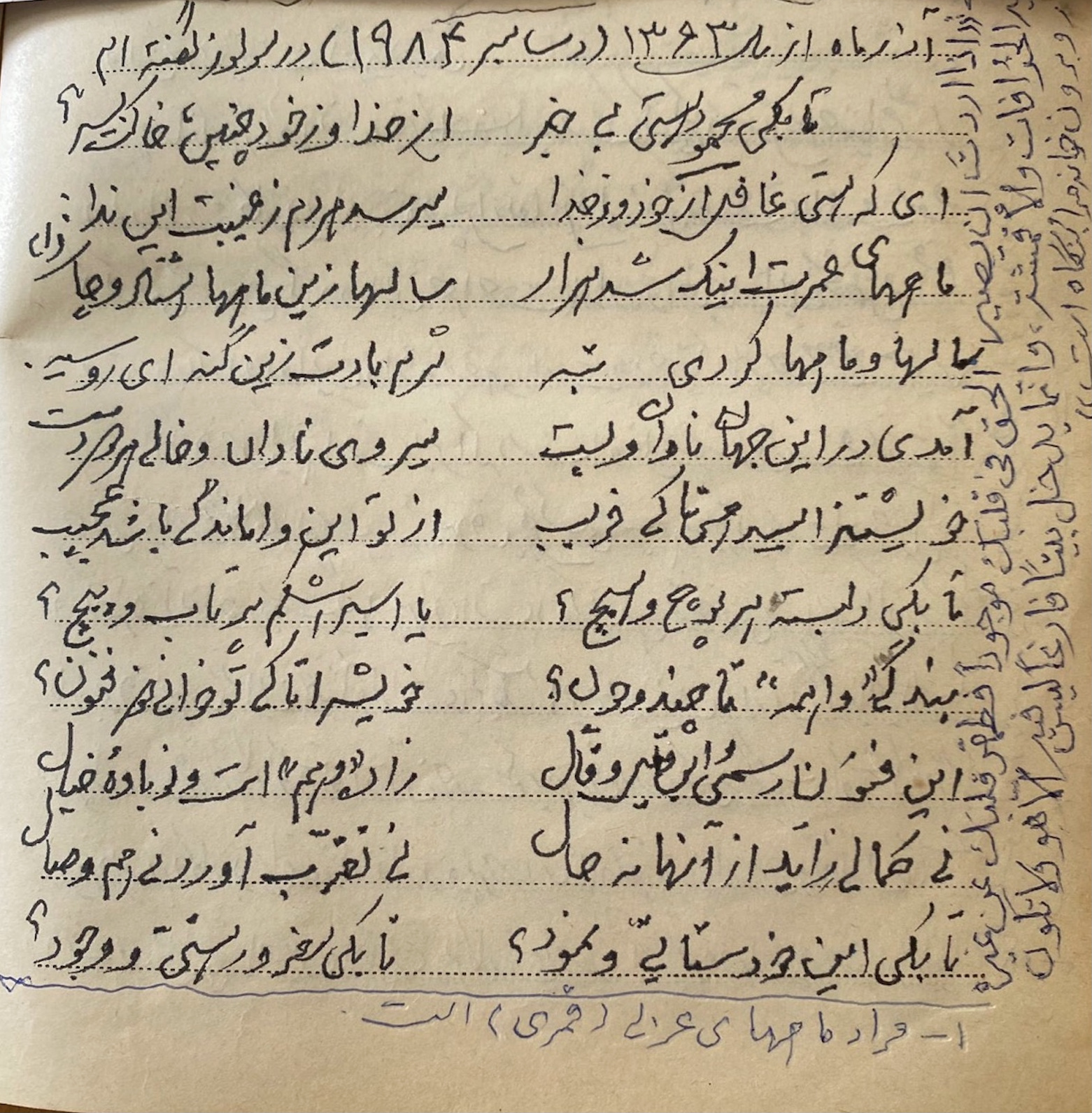
Manuscript of a poem by Shehabi written in 1984 in Mulhouse, France

Shehabi is the author of more than 50 books in Persian, English and Arabic. The references and names of the majority of his works can be found in: "Scholars of Shiite civilization"

The most famous ones are:

- The Leader of Wisdom in the field of the science of logic,
- Periods of Jurisprudence in several volumes in the field of the history of jurisprudence.
- He wrote a chapter of Professor Kenneth W. Morgan's book, "Islam the Straight Path" a book that is being taught in several universities around the world.
- "A Critical View Concerning the 'Merits of Simplicity in Truth'".
- his last work "Living to Love" (Zendehe Eshgh) which was written partly in America and partly in France.

== Some students ==
- Shirin Ebadi. Nobel Peace Prize in 2003
- Professor Ali Akbar Shehabi
- Simin Behbahani. A major figure in contemporary Persian poetry
- Professor Nasser Katouzian
- Professor Sayed Hassan Amin
- Professor Parviz Saney

== Shehabi's views on Iran in the 1980s (post islamic revolution in 1979) ==
Shehabi attached a great importance to the potentials of "man", he believed that it was through knowledge and wisdom that the human soul could attain divine status. He was deeply affected by the new regime, he was saddened by many aspects of the Iranian revolution in 1979 especially by the executions that were taking place in Iran. He wondered how some revolutionaries could consider themselves as true believers, while executing men and women, thinkers, educated individuals and other people in the name of religion. He believed that revolutionaries, for their personal interests, jeopardize the very existence of Iran and could lead its destruction. To him, all the decrees intended to eliminate human beings are contrary to religion and human dignity in the 20th century. He was a direct and attentive witness the discussions in the French National Assembly and Senate in 1981, which led to the approval of the law abolishing the death penalty in France, and he considered it an important step forward in the evolution of society and humanity.

Shehabi loved his country, Iran. He elaborated, "If we don't have a homeland, it would be difficult for us to have our own identity and our own beliefs." During the Iran–Iraq War (1980–1988), on 22 September 1980, the day of the invasion of Iran by the Arabs under the command of Saddam Hussein, He was already very ill and utterly upset. Although hospitalized in France, he kept repeting in a weak voice: "Lord, save Iran and the Iranians".

In 1946 (33 years before the Iranian revolution) he wrote the followings in his 'Emann Magazine' which he directed.

God bless us :

All these conflicts and disputes that history has shown us, and carried in the name of God, have all taken place to strengthen the power of a few over the main interest of the People, who was either deceived or ostracized in some ways.

They have used this motiv for their personal purposes thus, destroying the highest asset of man which is life.

All these clashes, noises and screams have been skillfully fabricated using phrases such as "serve the people" and "jihad" to make it look like they are acting for human freedom!

On top of that, the poor human beings, ignorant or helpless, deceived and bewildered, thank those fake, selfish, hateful leaders who are only in search of their own personal comfort and the domination of others!!.

— Mahmoud Shehabi

== Late life and death ==
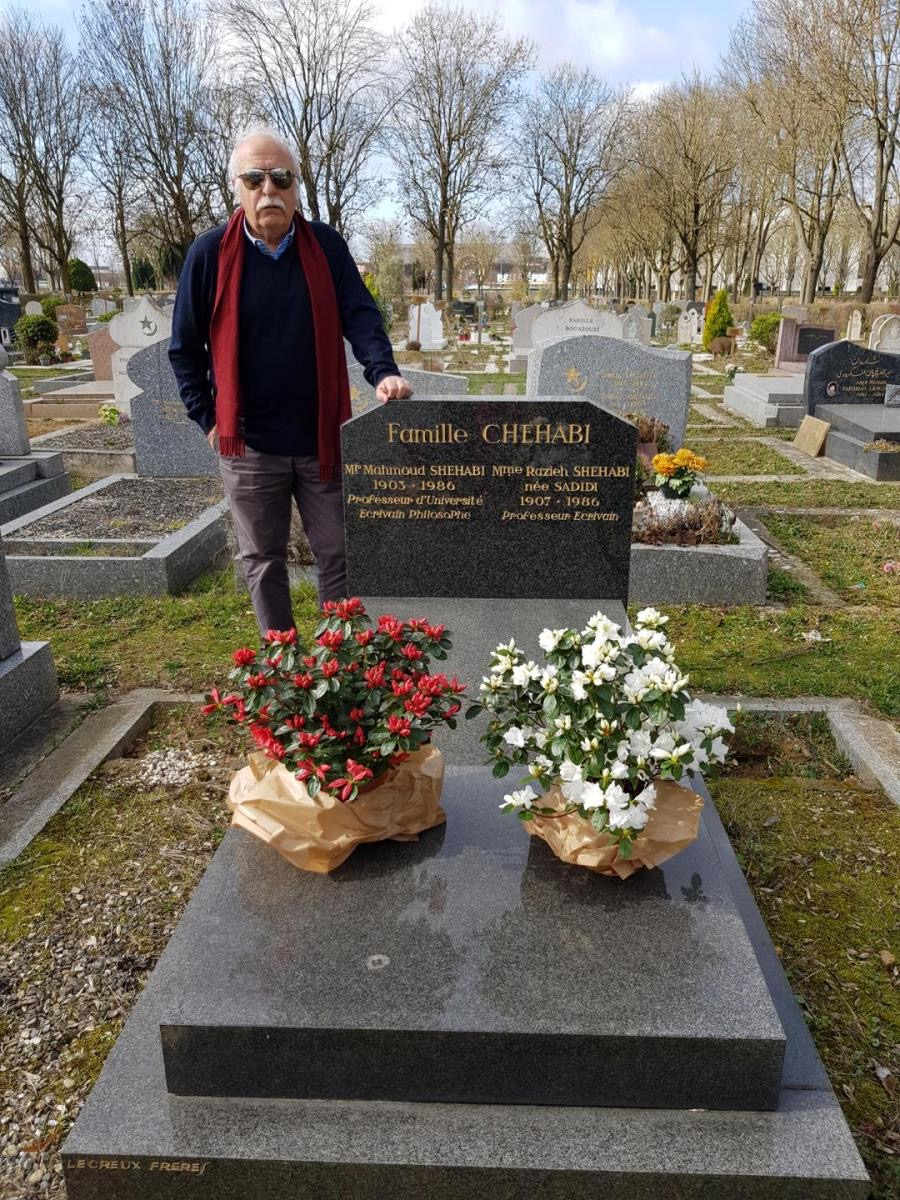
Shehabi's Shrine in Cimetière parisien de Thiais, at 101st division, row 16.

Shehabi after the Iranian revolution of 1979 left Iran definitively and until his death in 1986 resided near his son Mansour in Mulhouse, France. During these years, he traveled across European and the United States, Touring universities, cultural centers and libraries, exchanging thoughts with professors and researchers at Sorbonne in France, Heidelberg University in Germany, University of Geneva in Switzerland, University of Oxford and University of Cambridge in England, Stanford University in United States. Through these years he wrote his last book 'Zendeh Eshgh' (Persian: زنده عشق), which was published in Iran after his death.

Shehabi died on Saturday, 26 July 1986, at the age of 83 in Mulhouse, France. The day following his death, Mr. Jacques Chirac, the mayor of Paris at the time, suggested that his body be transported from Mulhouse to Paris for burial in Père Lachaise cemetery. Mansour informed Mr. Chirac that Shehabi wished to be buried in the Chehabi's family vault in the Cimetière parisien de Thiais. Shehabi's body was transported to Paris to be buried on Friday, 1 August 1986. Two months after his death, his wife Razieh Shehabi 'Sadidi' died in Mulhouse too on 27 September 1986, and is buried near her husband in the Parisian cemetery of Thiais.
