= Alexandra Ramm-Pfemfert =

German-Russian translator

Alexandra Ramm-Pfemfert (31 January/12 February 1883, in Starodub – 17 January 1963, in West Berlin) was a German-Russian translator, publisher and gallery owner. She is particularly noted for her work as a translator of Leon Trotsky and her work on Die Aktion with her husband, Franz Pfemfert.

== Youth ==
Alexandra Ramm-Pfemfert was the fifth of nine children of an Orthodox Jewish family living in Starodub, approximately 400 kilometers southwest of Moscow. Her father, Gilel, was a business man while Serafima, her mother was a housewife. Starodub belonged to the Pale of Settlement for Jews who lived there almost in complete isolation from the rest of the population. Noema Ramm, her elder sister also became a translator under the name Nadja Strasser. After her older siblings rebelled against the religiously conservative attitude of the Father, it was possible for Alexandra to attend the local girls' high school. At the age of 18, after graduation, she left home arriving in Berlin in 1901.

== In Berlin ==
After moving to Berlin she was active in the local leftist circles. She met Franz at the Café des Westens. After her marriage to Franz Pfemfert in 1911 they both got involved with Herwarth Walden's Expressionist journal Der Sturm. She worked with Franz when he launched Die Aktion later that year. Her sister, Maria Ramm, married Die Aktion contributor Carl Einstein in 1913. From 1917, Alexandra ran theAktions-Buch-und-Kunsthandlung ("Aktion's book and art dealers"), based in Kaiserallee 222 (today Bundesallee) in Berlin-Wilmersdorf.

== Relationship with Trotsky's family ==
Under the name Alexandra Ramm she had become a major translator of Leon Trotsky's works into German. However she never personally met Trotsky himself. Nevertheless, she did maintain an extensive correspondence with Trotsky and sent him newspapers when he was in exile in Turkey. In 1931, with her husband she helped arrange a visa for Trotsky's son Lev Sedov when he moved to Berlin in 1931. When Trotsky's daughter, Zinaida Volkova, committed suicide in Berlin in January 1933, Alexandra organised the funeral arrangements. However, when she and her husband went into exile in Mexico they arrived a few months after Trotsky's murder.

== Works ==
- "Zur proletarischen Kultur", Die Aktion, 10 No. 35/36, 4 September 1920
