= Sedov, Volgograd Oblast =

Sedov Седов
- Khutor
- Location within Volgograd Oblast Location within Russia
- Coordinates: 49°40′N 42°37′E
- Country: Russia
- Region: Volgograd Oblast
- District: Kumylzhensky District
- Time zone: UTC+4:00

Sedov (Russian: Седов) is a rural locality (a khutor) in Krasnyanskoye Rural Settlement, Kumylzhensky District, Volgograd Oblast, Russia. The population was 155 as of 2010.

== Geography ==
Sedov is located in forest steppe, on Khopyorsko-Buzulukskaya Plain, on the right bank of the Medveditsa River, 53 km south of Kumylzhenskaya (the district's administrative centre) by road. Krasnyansky is the nearest rural locality.
