= Lev Sedov =

Russian writer (1906–1938)

- Лев Седов
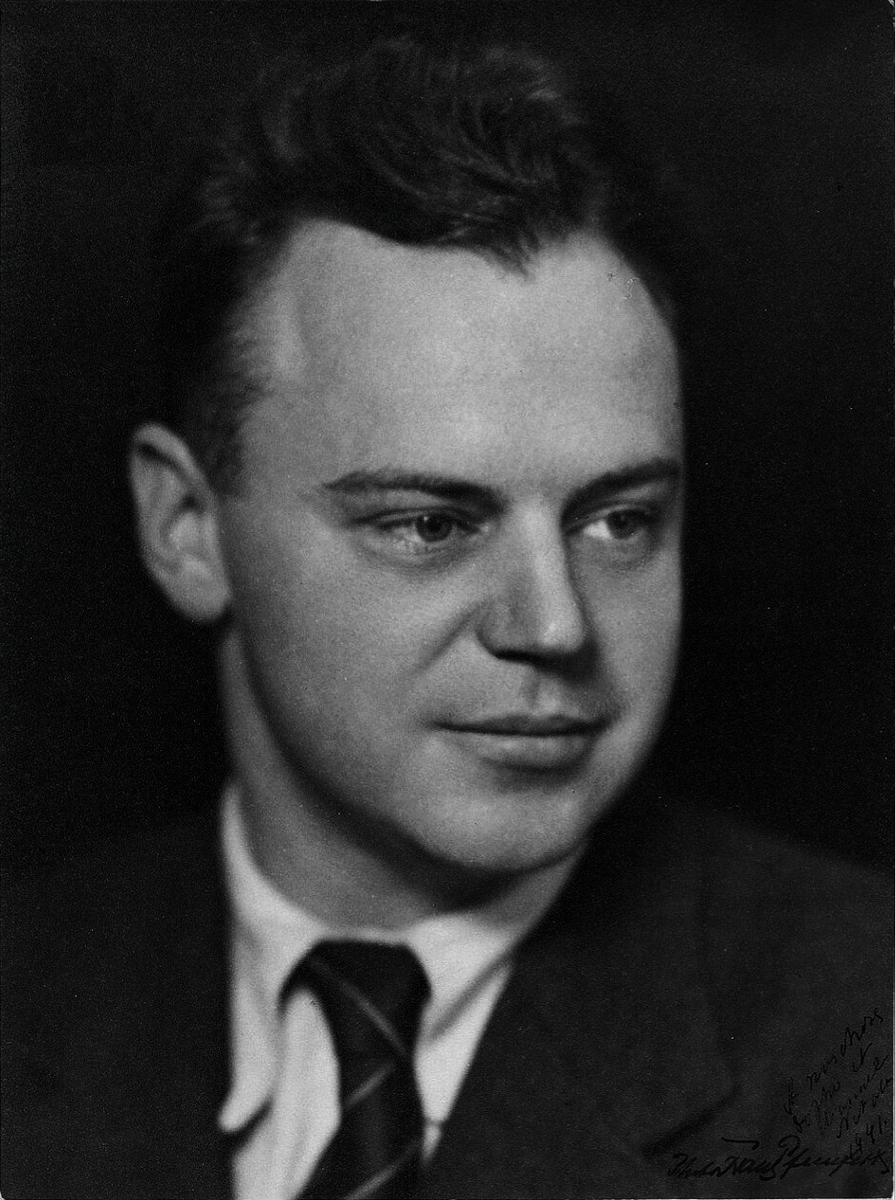
- Sedov, c. 1920s
- Born: Lev Lvovich Sedov; 24 February 1906
- Died: 16 February 1938 (aged 31); Paris, France
- Resting place: Cimetière parisien de Thiais, Paris
- Parents: Leon Trotsky (father); Natalia Sedova (mother)
- Relatives: Sergei Sedov (brother); Zinaida Volkova (half-sister)

Lev Lvovich Sedov (Russian: Лев Львович Седов, also known as Leon Sedov; 24 February 1906 – 16 February 1938) was a Russian writer and the first son and third child of politician and revolutionary Leon Trotsky, born during his second marriage, with Natalia Sedova. Sedov was born when his father was in prison facing life imprisonment for participating in the Revolution of 1905.

== Life ==
Sedov lived separately from his parents after the October Revolution to avoid being seen as privileged. He married in 1925 at the age of 19 and had a son, Lev, the following year. Sedov supported his father in the struggle against Joseph Stalin and became a leader of the Trotskyist movement in his own right.

=== Exile in Turkey and Germany ===
Sedov accompanied his parents into exile in 1929, and then in 1931 he moved to Berlin to study. Alexandra Ramm-Pfemfert and her husband, Franz Pfemfert, arranged his visa and ensured that he saw an eye specialist to treat an eye disease he was suffering from. Carl Sternheim, a friend of the Pfemferts, met him during this period and described him as an extremely nice looking young man with light brown hair and blue eyes but who chain smokes and vividly explains that "he goes through fifty of them every day". During this period Sedov spoke little German but was fluent in French. During this time he also assisted with printing and distributing the Russian-language Bulletin of the Opposition before becoming an editor and writer for it.

==== Trotsky's bloc ====
In 1932, he helped Trotsky create a political bloc with the anti-Stalin opposition inside the USSR and was in contact with some of its members like Ivan Smirnov, through the old bolshevik Eduard Holtzman, whom he called in his letters "the informant". Sedov showed he was far more interested in using a direct aggressive policy than Trotsky, stating: "Before everything else we have to drive out the present leadership and get rid of Stalin nothing but their liquidation can bring victory". The bloc was dissolved in early 1933, according to Pierre Broué.

=== Exile in Paris ===
Just before Adolf Hitler came to power in 1933, Sedov moved to Paris, where he worked as a Parisian laborer and became an important activist in the Trotskyist movement. He was frequently followed by agents of the Soviet NKVD. Between 1935 and 1938, while in Paris, Sedov and his partner, Jeanne Martin, took in and cared for his young nephew, Vsevolod Volkov, called "Sieva" by the family (and who later, in Mexico, took the name Esteban Volkov), the son of Sedov's late half-sister, Zina.

== Death ==
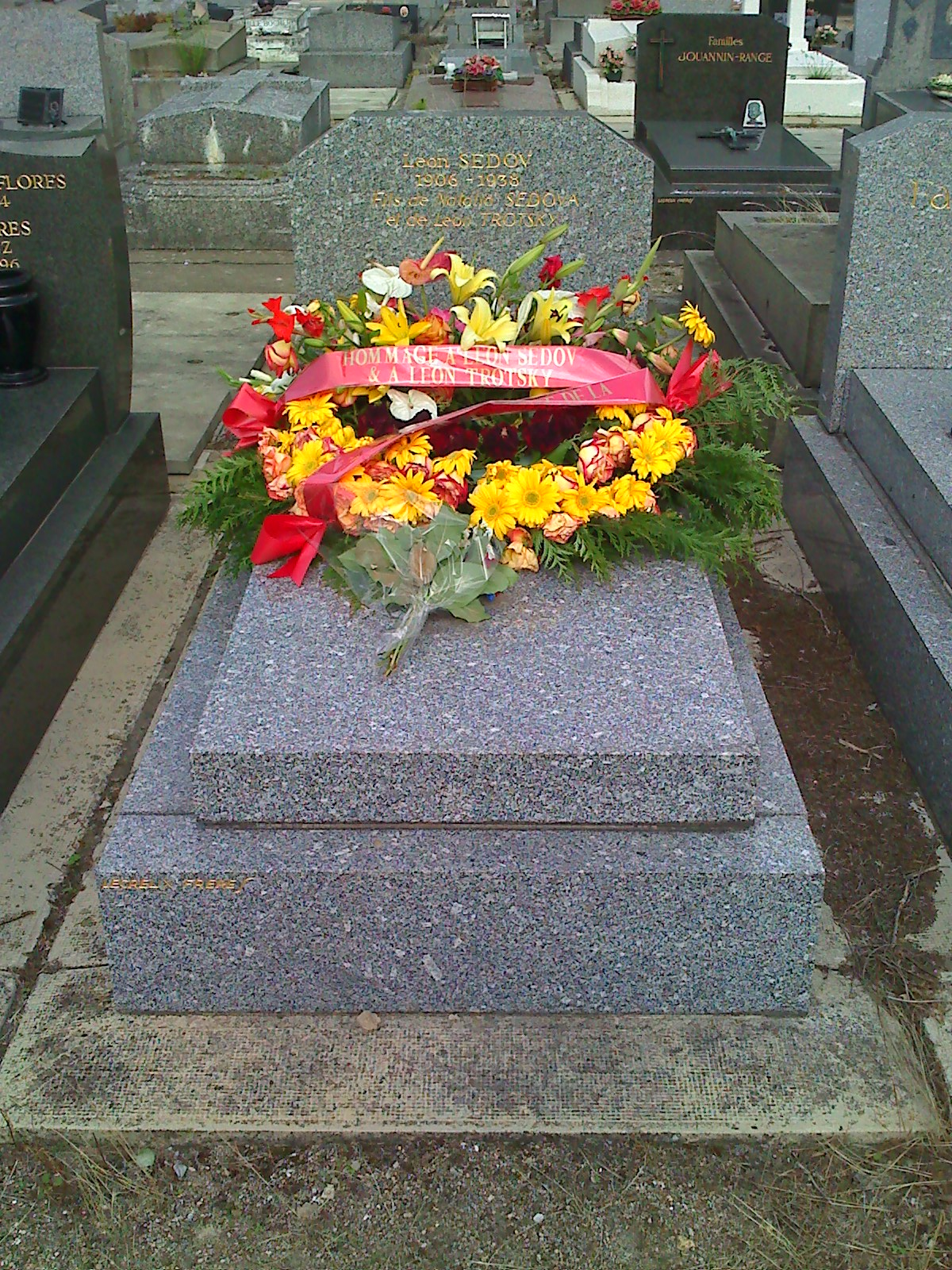
The grave of Lev "Léon" Sedov in the Cimetière de Thiais

After an acute attack of appendicitis in February 1938, Mark Zborowski, an NKVD agent who had posed as Sedov's comrade and friend, arranged to take him to a private clinic instead of a Paris hospital. At the same time, Zborowski notified the NKVD that Sedov had been transported under an assumed name to the Clinique Mirabeau, which was operated by a White Russian with connections to Soviet intelligence, who performed an appendectomy. Complications set in after the operation, but Sedov apparently received no further treatment. He was later taken to a Paris hospital, where he died.

Some historians who have analyzed the matter believe Sedov was murdered by agents of the Soviet State who were in Paris watching him, either while in hospital or by poisoning him, causing his condition. In 1994, Pavel Sudoplatov, a lieutenant general in the NKVD who at that time was in charge of planning assassinations abroad, including the one of Sedov's father, claimed in his memoirs, Special Tasks, that Soviet agents played no part in his death. In 1956, Zborowski had testified before a United States Senate subcommittee that he had contacted the NKVD to report that Sedov had entered the clinic, and then to confirm his death.

Sedov's grave is in Cimetière de Thiais, south of Paris.

== Writings ==
Lev Sedov's major political work is The Red Book on the Moscow Trials (1936). At a time that a leftist consensus accepted the verdicts of the Moscow trials, the book analyzed them with the aim of discrediting them. It was the first thorough-going exposé of the frame-ups upon which the trials were based. Trotsky himself described it as a "priceless gift... the first crushing reply to the Kremlin falsifiers".
