= Sergei Sedov =

Soviet Great Purge victim (1908–1937)

Sergei Lvovich Sedov
- Сергей Львович Седов
- Born: 21 March 1908; Vienna, Austria-Hungary
- Died: 29 October 1937 (aged 29); Russian SFSR, USSR
- Burial place: Krasnoyarsk, Russian SFSR, USSR
- Education: Moscow Mechanical
- Occupations: Engineer; scientist
- Employer: Moscow Aviation Institute
- Criminal penalty: Forced labor; exile; death
- Criminal status: Rehabilitated (1988)
- Family: Leon Trotsky (father); Natalia Sedova (mother); Lev Sedov (brother); Yulia Akselrod (daughter)

Sergei Lvovich Sedov (Russian: Сергей Львович Седов; 21 March 1908 – 29 October 1937) was a Soviet engineer and scientist. The son of Leon Trotsky, he was killed in the Great Purge.

== Personal life ==
The son of Leon Trotsky and his second wife Natalia Sedova, and younger brother of Lev Sedov, Sergei Lvovich Sedov (Russian: Сергей Львович Седов) was born on 21 March 1908 in Vienna, Austria-Hungary. A graduate of the Moscow Mechanical Institute, and working at the Moscow Aviation Institute, he was an apolitical engineer and scientist. His daughter, Yulia, was born around October 1935.

== Arrest and death ==
Despite having taken his mother's surname to avoid political affiliation with his father, Sedov was arrested on 3 March 1935 "on trumped-up charges [and] refused to betray [Trotsky]". On 14 July 1935, he was sentenced by the NKVD to five years in a labor camp; six days later, the sentence was amended to five years of exile in Krasnoyarsk, working at Krasmash. A 26 May 1936 resentencing sent Sedov to Ukhtpechlag on 3 July, followed by a transfer back to Krasnoyarsk on 23 February 1937 for reinvestigation.

Sedov died in 1937, though accounts differ on the specifics. Hoover Digest reported that some records show he was killed in a prison uprising, while others allege he was shot in Krasnoyarsk after being accused of a poisoning plot. In 1988, The New York Times asserted that Sedov was returned to Moscow and shot for Trotsky allegedly plotting to kill Joseph Stalin. Memorial's database of victims of political terror in the USSR (Russian: Жертвы политического террора в СССР) shows that he was sentenced to death by the Military Collegium of the Supreme Court of the Soviet Union on 29 October 1937, executed the same day, and buried in Krasnoyarsk.

After Sedov's daughter Yulia Akselrod petitioned Soviet President Mikhail Gorbachev, Sedov was rehabilitated in late 1988 by the Supreme Court of the Soviet Union.
