= Adolph Joffe =

Russian revolutionary, politician and Soviet diplomat

- Адольф Иоффе
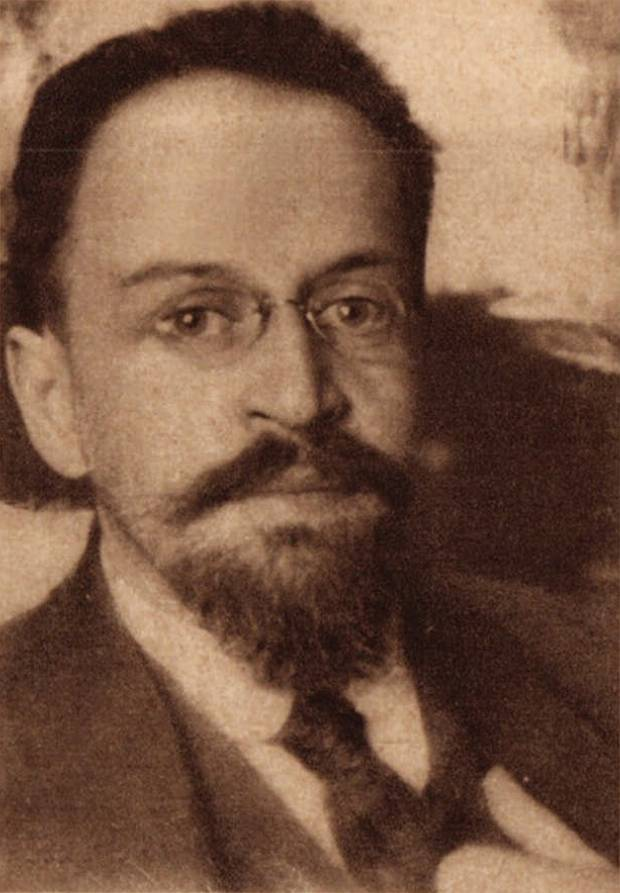
- Joffe in 1918

Ambassador of the Soviet Union to China
- In office 1922–1924
- Preceded by: Aleksandr Paykes
- Succeeded by: Lev Karakhan

Ambassador of the Soviet Union to Austria
- In office 12 December 1924 – 29 June 1925
- Preceded by: Voldemar Aussem
- Succeeded by: Jan Antonovich Berzin

Member of the 6th Secretariat
- In office 6 August 1917 – 8 March 1918

Personal details
- Born: Adolph Abramovich Joffe; 10 October 1883 Simferopol, Russian Empire
- Died: 16 November 1927 (aged 44) Moscow, Russian SFSR, Soviet Union
- Party: RSDLP (Bolsheviks) (1903–1918); Russian Communist Party (1918–1927)

Adolph Abramovich Joffe (Russian: Адо́льф Абра́мович Ио́ффе; alternatively transliterated as Adolf Ioffe or Yoffe; 10 October 1883 – 16 November 1927) was a Russian revolutionary, Bolshevik politician and Soviet diplomat of Karaite descent.

== Biography ==
=== Revolutionary career ===
Adolf Abramovich Joffe was born in Simferopol, Crimea, Russian Empire, in a wealthy Karaite family. He became a social democrat in 1900 while still in high school, formally joining the Russian Social Democratic Labor Party in 1903. In 1904 Joffe was sent to Baku, which he had to flee to avoid arrest. He was then sent to Moscow, but had to flee again, this time abroad. After the events of Bloody Sunday on 9 January 1905, Joffe returned to Russia and took an active part in the Russian Revolution of 1905. In early 1906 he was forced to emigrate and lived in Berlin until his expulsion from Germany in May 1906.

In Russia, Joffe was close to the Menshevik faction within the Russian Social Democratic Party. However, after moving to Vienna in May 1906, he became close to Leon Trotsky's position and helped Trotsky edit Pravda from 1908 to 1912 while studying medicine and psychoanalysis with Alfred Adler. He also used his family's fortune to support Pravda financially. During the course of his underground revolutionary activity Joffe adopted the party name "V. Krymsky," the surname meaning "The Crimean."

In 1912 Joffe was arrested while visiting Odessa, imprisoned for 10 months and then exiled to Siberia.

=== 1917 Revolution ===
In 1917, Joffe, freed from the Siberian exile by the February Revolution, returned to the Crimea. Crimean social democrats sent him to the capital, Petrograd, to represent them, but he soon moved to an internationalist revolutionary position, which made it impossible for him to remain in an organization dominated by less radical Mensheviks. Instead, he joined forces with Trotsky, who had just returned from abroad.

In May 1917, Joffe and Trotsky temporarily joined Mezhraiontsy who merged with the Bolsheviks at the VI Bolshevik Party Congress held between 26 July and 3 August 1917 (all dates are Old Style until February 1918). At the Congress, Joffe was elected a candidate (non-voting) member of the Central Committee, but two days later, on 5 August, the Central Committee, some of whose members were in prison, in hiding or lived far from Petrograd and could not attend its meetings, made Joffe a member of its permanent ("narrow") bureau. On 6 August Joffe was made an alternate member of the Central Committee Secretariat and on 20 August made a member of the editorial board of the Bolshevik newspaper Pravda which was then temporarily called Proletary (Proletarian) for legal reasons.

Joffe headed the Bolshevik faction in the Petrograd Duma (city government) in the fall of 1917 and was one of the Duma's delegates to the Democratic Conference between 14 and 22 September. Although Joffe, along with Lenin and Trotsky, opposed the Bolsheviks' participation in the consultative Pre-parliament created by the Democratic Conference, the motion was carried by the majority of Bolshevik deputies at the Democratic Conference and Joffe was made a Bolshevik member of the Pre-parliament. Two weeks later, on 7 October, once the more radical Bolshevik faction gained the upper hand, Joffe and other Bolsheviks walked out of the Pre-parliament.

In October 1917, Joffe supported Lenin's and Trotsky's revolutionary position against Grigory Zinoviev's and Lev Kamenev's more moderate position, demanding that the latter be expelled from the Central Committee after an apparent breach of party discipline. Joffe served as the Chairman of the Petrograd Military Revolutionary Committee which overthrew the Russian Provisional Government on 25–26 October 1917. Immediately after the revolution, he supported Lenin and Trotsky against Zinoviev, Kamenev, Alexei Rykov and other Bolshevik Central Committee members who would have shared power with other socialist parties.

=== Brest-Litovsk ===
From 30 November 1917 until January 1918, Joffe was the head of the Soviet delegation that was sent to Brest-Litovsk to negotiate an end to the hostilities with Germany. On 22 December 1917 Joffe submitted the following Bolshevik pre-conditions for a peace treaty:

- No forcible annexation of territories seized in the war
- Restore national independence where it was terminated during war
- National groups independent before the war should be allowed by referendum to decide question of independence
- Multi-cultural regions should be administered so as to allow all possible cultural independence and self-regulation
- No indemnities. Personal losses should be compensated out of international fund
- Colonial question should be decided according to points 1–4

Although Joffe had signed a ceasefire agreement with the Central Powers on 2 December 1917, he supported Trotsky in the latter's refusal to sign a permanent peace treaty in February. (Note: Trotsky, People's Commissar for Foreign Affairs, appointed Joffe to lead the negotiation team, but Trotsky resigned his post prior to the signing of the Treaty of Brest-Litovsk.) Once the Bolshevik Central Committee decided to sign the Treaty of Brest-Litovsk on 23 February 1918, Joffe remained a member of the Soviet delegation only under protest and in a purely consultative capacity. Grigory Sokolnikov, leader of the signatory team, signed on behalf of Russia.

Remembering Joffe's presence with the Bolshevik delegation at Brest-Litovsk, Count Ottokar Czernin, the Austro-Hungarians' representative would later write:

The leader of the Russian delegation is a Jew, named Joffe, who has recently been released from Siberia [...] after the meal I had a first conversation with Mr. Joffe. His whole theory is simply based on the universal application of the right of self-governance of nations in the broadest form. The thus liberated nations then have to be brought to love each other [...] I advised him that we would not attempt to imitate the Russian example and that we likewise would not tolerate a meddling in our internal affairs. If he continued to hold on his utopic viewpoints the peace would not be possible and then he would be well advised just to take the journey back with the next train. Mr. Joffe looked astonishedly at me with his gentle eyes and was silent for a while. Then he continued in a – for me, ever unforgettable – friendly, or I would even nearly say suppliant, tone: 'I very much hope that we will also be able to raise the revolution in your country...'

At the VII Extraordinary Congress of the Bolshevik Party between 6 and 8 March 1918, Joffe was re-elected to the Central Committee, but only as a candidate (non-voting) member. He remained in Petrograd when the Soviet government moved to Moscow later in March and worked as a member of the Petrograd Bureau of the Central Committee until he was appointed Soviet representative to Germany in April. On April 18 he set up the Soviet embassy in Berlin, which besides maintaining relations with the German government worked with the Spartacist League to print and distribute large amounts of communist propaganda; at the same time he misled German politicians and businessmen about the Bolsheviks' intentions, arguing to Gustav Stresemann that the Bolshevik "Government was prepared to give up its Utopian goals and pursue a pragmatic socialist policy." He also gained the support of influential German businessmen by offering favorable trade deals. He signed the Soviet-German Supplementary Treaty on 27 August 1918. On 6 November 1918, shortly before the Armistice and the German Revolution, the Soviet delegation in Berlin headed by Joffe was expelled from the country on charges of preparing a Communist uprising in Germany, after a faked accident showed that they were using the diplomatic bag to spread propaganda supporting a revolution in Germany. Straight before Joffe left Berlin he rendered Oskar Cohn about 1 million Mark and a 10.5 million Russian ruble mandate for a bank account at Mendelssohn & Co. After the delegation returned to Russia Joffe claimed to have paid this money to the Independent Social Democratic Party of Germany (USPD) to support the revolutionary activities and to purchase weapons. These payments led to the demission of Wilhelm Solf as German minister of Foreign affairs, who refused a further cooperation with the USPD.

=== Diplomatic career ===
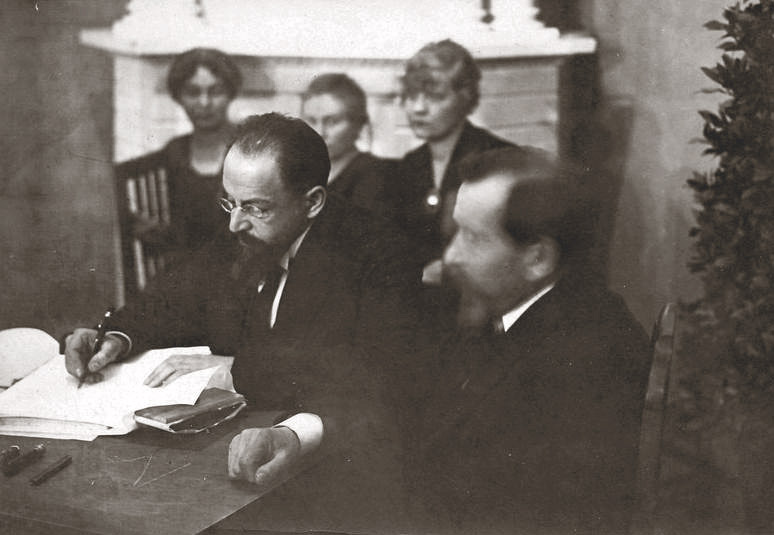
Joffe signing the 1920 Treaty of Tartu

In 1919–1920, Joffe was a member of the Council of Labor and Defense and People's Commissar (minister) of State Control of the Ukrainian Soviet Republic. He was not re-elected to the Central Committee at the VIII Party Congress in March 1919 and would never again occupy a major leadership position. He negotiated a ceasefire with Poland in October 1920 and peace treaties with Estonia, Latvia and Lithuania in late 1920. In 1921 he signed the Peace of Riga with Poland, ending the Polish-Soviet War of 1918–1921, and was made deputy chairman of the Turkestan Commission of the VTsIK and Sovnarkom.

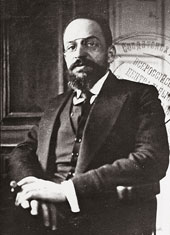
Joffe's official embassy portrait, 1924

Joffe was one of the Soviet delegates at the Genoa Conference in February 1922, an experience he described in a short book published later that same year. After the Soviet walkout, he was made ambassador to China (in office: 1922 to 1923 or 1924), as the Soviet troubleshooter (or Kuznetsov) of those days. In January 1923, he and Sun Yat-Sen signed the Sun–Joffe Manifesto in Shanghai on aid to the Kuomintang on the assumption that the latter would cooperate with Chinese Communists, presumably with Lenin's approval. While based in China, Joffe traveled to Japan in January 1923 to settle Soviet-Japanese relations. The negotiations proved long and difficult, and ended when Joffe became gravely ill and had to be sent back to Moscow. After a partial recovery, he served as a member of the Soviet delegation to Great Britain in 1924 and as Soviet representative in Austria in 1924–1926.

In 1926 his declining health and disagreements with the ruling Bolshevik faction forced his semi-retirement. He tried to concentrate on teaching, but it also proved difficult due to his ill-health.

=== Opposition and suicide ===
Joffe remained a friend and loyal supporter of Leon Trotsky through the 1920s, joining him in the Left Opposition. By late 1927, he was gravely ill, in extreme pain and confined to his bed. After a refusal by the Stalinist leadership of the Communist Party to send him abroad for treatment and Trotsky's expulsion from the Communist Party on 12 November 1927, he committed suicide on 16 November. He left a farewell letter addressed to Trotsky, but the letter was seized by Soviet secret police agents and later quoted by Stalinists to discredit both Joffe and Trotsky. Trotsky's eulogy at Joffe's funeral was his last public speech in the Soviet Union.

Joffe's wife Maria Joffe was arrested as a left-oppositionist Trotskyist by Stalin's security forces, yet she survived to write her memoirs One Long Night – A Tale of Truth. Joffe's daughter, Nadezhda Joffe, also an active Trotskyist, survived Stalin's prisons and labor camps and published a memoir, Back in Time: My Life, My Fate, My Epoch.
