= Cape Sedov =

Ice cape in Queen Maud Land, Antarctica

Cape Sedov (69°22′S 14°5′E) is the ice cape which forms the northwest extremity of Lazarve Ice Shelf along the coast of Queen Maud Land. First photographed from the air and mapped by the German Antarctic Expedition, 1938–39. Remapped by the Soviet Antarctic Expedition in 1959 and named for Russian polar explorer G.Ya. Sedov.
