= Klaus Siebenhaar =

German publisher

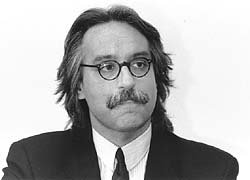
Klaus Siebenhaar (1995)

Klaus Siebenhaar (born 1952) is a German university lecturer, publisher and cultural manager. In addition to his academic career at the FU Berlin, where he was director of an institute of Communication Science and Applied Cultural Studies from 1988, Siebenhaar worked for several publishing houses and theatres as an editor and publisher. He then founded his own publishing house, B&S Siebenhaar Verlag, as well as the Institute for Culture and Media Management (IKMW) at the university.

== Career ==
Siebenhaar was born in Siegen, and grew up in Kassel. He completed his Abitur at the Heinrich-Schütz-Schule. From 1972, Siebenhaar studied German studies, theatre studies and history of art at the FU Berlin. He was promoted to the doctorate in 1979 and habilitated in 1993 in modern German literature. From 1988, he was director of the Institute for Communication Science and Applied Cultural Studies of the FU. Since 1994, Siebenhaar was professor for cultural and media management at the FU Berlin. In 2017, he was awarded emeritus status and left the FU Berlin.

In 2009, Siebenhaar founded the competence centre "Cultural Management in China" (KUMA) to bundle and expand academic-artistic and continuing education projects with China, while at the same time promoting the development of university and cultural cooperation with Turkey. Since 2011, he has held a visiting professorship at the Central Academy for Fine Arts (CAFA) in Beijing, and also organises training programmes for museum and theatre managers in China as well as an annual Summer Academy.

=== Criticism ===
During his professorship at the FU Berlin, he was criticised for being "humiliating, disrespectful and choleric" towards students and for threatening to expel them. Siebenhaar denied this. Siebenhaar came under criticism because it was suspected that a person who had received professorship had donated to the institute, citing the case of Bernhard Lorentz, whose foundation paid 160,000 euros between 2009 and 2011.

=== Other activities ===
From 1973 to 1975, Siebenhaar worked at the Staatstheater Kassel as an assistant stage director, and from 1977 to 1983 at Propyläen Verlag Berlin as an editor. From 1981 to 1983, he directed the research project and exhibition "Das war ein Vorspiel nur... 50 Jahre Bücherverbrennung" (with Walter Huber and Hermann Haarmann) at the Akademie der Künste in Berlin. From 1990 to 2001, Siebenhaar worked at Deutsches Theater in Berlin in the artistic management and headed public relations and marketing.

From 1994 to 1999 he was publishing director of the Fannei & Walz Verlag and the FAB Verlag. In 1999 he co-founded the Bostelmann & Siebenhaar Verlag (also B&S Siebenhaar), as managing partner. From 2001 to 2006 he was also head of marketing and development of the Jewish Museum Berlin. Since 2001, Siebenhaar has been deputy chairman of the board of trustees of the Starke Art Foundation in Berlin. From 2009 to 2011, he was on the advisory board of the Goethe-Institut in Munich and advised the European Investment Bank Luxembourg on cultural project development. Since 2014, Siebenhaar has been a member of the supervisory board of the Staatstheater Hannover. After his retirement from the FU Berlin in 2017, he founded the Institute for Culture and Media Economy (IKMW) together with the music publisher Rolf Budde.

Siebenhaar has also organised numerous exhibitions in Berlin, including at the Kunstforum der Grundkreditbank, the National Arts Museum of China (NAMOC), the CAFA Art Museum in Beijing and the Jewish Museum Berlin. He has also realised numerous staged readings for Deutsches Theater, the Jewish Museum, and art projects in public spaces in Berlin, Kassel and China. He has produced festivals for DEAG Deutsche Entertainment and Berlin Partner. Siebenhaar has also published widely on German literature from the 18th to the 20th century, drama and theatre, cultural policy and communication studies as well as questions of cultural and media management.

== Publications ==
- documenta. A Brief History of an Exhibition and Its Contexts, B&S Siebenhaar Verlag, Berlin 2017, ISBN 978-3-943132-64-9
- European Theatre and the Public. Development, Orientations and Evidence (with Achim Müller), B&S Siebenhaar Verlag, Berlin 2017, ISBN 978-3-943132-57-1
- Auftrag Publikum. Der Hochkulturbetrieb zwischen Audience Development und Ereignisästhetik, B&S Siebenhaar Verlag, Berlin 2016, ISBN 978-3-943132-45-8
- Das kuratierte ich. Jugendkulturen als Medienkulturen im 21. Jahrhundert (with Steffen Damm, Sirkka Jendis, Moritz Müller-Wirth), B&S Siebenhaar Verlag, Berlin 2012, ISBN 978-3-936962-98-7
- (ed.) Culture First! Culture Management in China – Second Edition (with Uwe Nitschke), B&S Siebenhaar Verlag, Berlin 2011
- (publ.) Leadership – Vom Führen in modernen Zeiten, B&S Siebenhaar Verlag, Berlin 2010
- (publ.) Audience Development oder Die Kunst, neues Publikum zu gewinnen, B&S Siebenhaar Verlag, Berlin 2009
- Lichtenbergs Schaubühne. Imaginarium und kleines Welttheater (Habilitationsschrift), VS Verlag für Sozialwissenschaften, Opladen 1994, ISBN 978-3-531126-06-7
- (publ.) Kulturmanagement. Wirkungsvolle Strukturen im kommunalen Kulturbereich, Gütersloh 1993
- (publ.) Das poetische Berlin. Metropolenkultur zwischen Gründerzeit und Nationalsozialismus, Wiesbaden 1992
- Kultur & Management, Berlin 1992
- (ed.) Carl Einstein. Werke, Berliner Ausgabe (with Hermann Haarmann), 5 vol., Berlin 1992–1996
- (ed.) Alfred Kerr, Werke in Einzelbänden, vol. III: Essays. Theater, Film (with Hermann Haarmann), Berlin 1991
- (ed.) Einakter und kleine Dramen der zwanziger Jahre, Stuttgart 1988
- (ed.) "Das war ein Vorspiel nur ..." Bücherverbrennung Deutschland 1933: Voraussetzungen und Folgen (with Hermann Haarmann and Walter Huder), Berlin 1983
- Klänge aus Utopia. Zeitkritik, Wandlung und Utopie im expressionistischen Drama (Dissertation), Agora Verlag, Berlin/Darmstadt 1982, ISBN 978-3-870080-99-0
