= Natalia Sedova =

Russian revolutionary (1882–1962)

Natalia Ivanovna Sedova
- Наталья Ивановна Седова
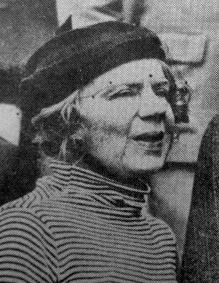
- Sedova in 1937
- Born: 5 April 1882; Romny, Poltava Governorate, Russian Empire
- Died: 23 January 1962 (aged 79); Corbeil-Essonnes, Paris, France
- Spouse: Leon Trotsky (m. 1903; died 1940)

Natalia Ivanovna Sedova (Russian: Ната́лья Ива́новна Седо́ва, IPA: [nɐˈtalʲjə ɪˈvanəvnə sʲɪˈdovə]; 5 April 1882 – 23 January 1962) was a Russian revolutionary and author known as the second wife of Leon Trotsky. She wrote on cultural matters pertaining to Marxism.

== Life ==
Natalia was born in to the family of a wealthy merchant. Her father was of Cossack origins and her mother was from the Polish nobility. Sedova studied at the Kharkov Institute for Noble Maidens, from where she was expelled for participating in the revolutionary movement.

Natalia met Leon Trotsky in late 1902, after his escape from Siberia. His first wife Aleksandra Sokolovskaya had remained behind, with their two daughters, and they were divorced soon thereafter. Natalia and Trotsky married in 1903. They had two children together, Lev Sedov (24 February 1906 – 16 February 1938) and Sergei Sedov (21 March 1908 – 29 October 1937), both of whom would predecease their parents. Trotsky later explained that after the 1917 revolution:

In order not to oblige my sons to change their name, I, for "citizenship" requirements, took on the name of my wife.

However he never used the name "Sedov" either privately or publicly. Natalia Sedova sometimes signed her name "Sedova-Trotskaya." Trotsky and his first wife Aleksandra maintained a friendly relationship after their divorce. She disappeared in 1935 during the Great Purges and was killed by Stalinist forces three years later.

Lev Sedov was an active and leading member of the Bolshevik-Leninist movement that his father led and was almost certainly assassinated as a result of that. Her other son, Sergei Sedov, who was not politically active and remained in Russia, was almost certainly killed by agents of Joseph Stalin.

After her husband's assassination in 1940, Natalia Sedova remained in Mexico and maintained contact with many exiled revolutionaries. Her best-known work in these last years was a biography of Trotsky, which she co-authored with fellow Russian revolutionary Victor Serge. She was also close to the Spanish revolutionary Grandizo Munis who had led the tiny Spanish Sección Bolchevique-Leninista during the revolutionary events in the 1930s. Under his influence, she came to adopt the position that the USSR was state capitalist and that the Fourth International founded by Trotsky no longer held to the revolutionary programme of Communism. Therefore, she broke from the FI in 1951. In 1960, she moved to France.
