= Franz Pfemfert =

German journalist (1879–1954)

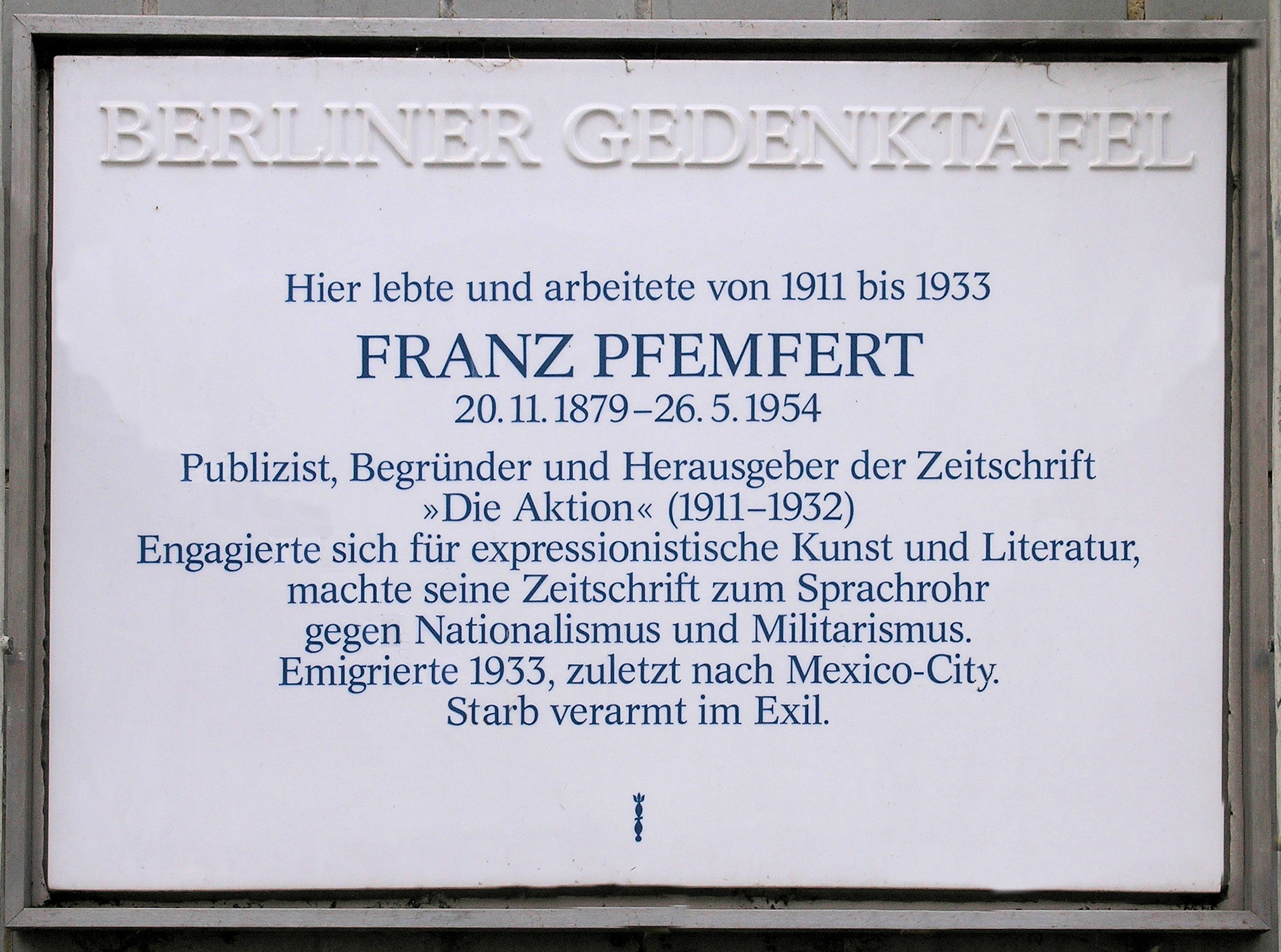
- Memorial plaque to Pfemfert, Nassauische Straße 17, Berlin-Wilmersdorf
- Born: November 20, 1879; Lötzen, German Empire
- Died: May 26, 1954 (aged 74); Mexico City, Mexico
- Occupation: Journalist
- Spouse: Alexandra Ramm-Pfemfert

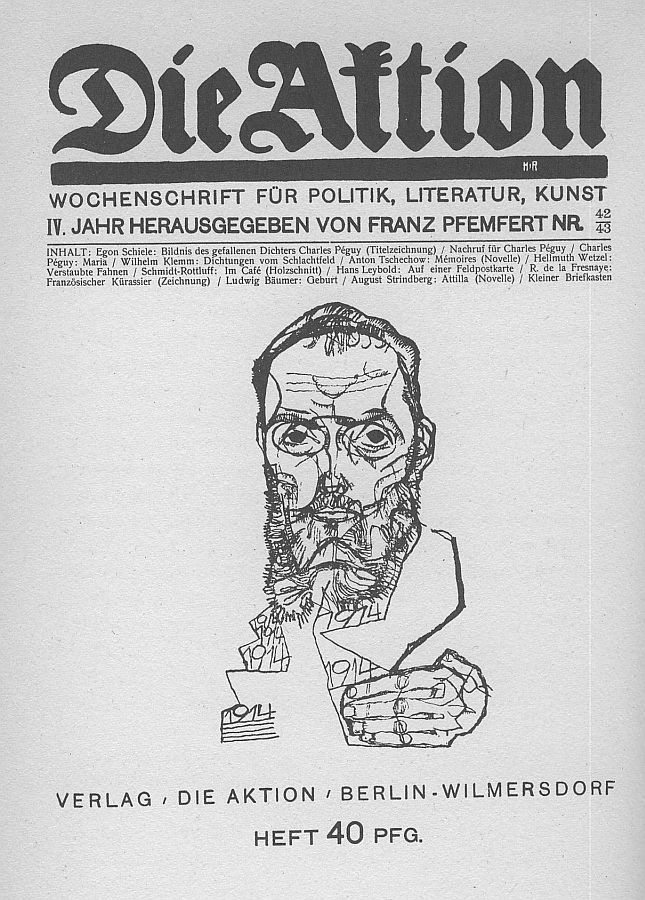
Front page of Die Aktion from October 1914 with a portrait of Charles Péguy by Egon Schiele

Franz Pfemfert (20 November 1879, Lötzen, East Prussia (now Giżycko, Poland) – 26 May 1954, Mexico City) was a German journalist, editor of Die Aktion, literary critic, politician and portrait photographer. Pfemfert occasionally wrote under the pseudonym U. Gaday (derived from Russian "ugadaj", dt: "guess").

In 1911 he married Alexandra Ramm, who had moved to Berlin from Russia and who was involved in Russian translations.

Pfemfert was involved in founding the Antinationale Sozialisten-Partei (Antinational Socialist Party), originally a clandestine organisation founded in 1915. Die Aktion became its official organ following the German Revolution in November 1918.

He subsequently became close friends with Leon Trotsky, even though he maintained quite distinct political views.

After the Nazi seizure of power, Pfemfert fled to Karlovy Vary, Czechoslovakia. Here the Czech stalinists called for his deportation.

== Publishing ==
Alongside publishing Die Aktion, Pfemfert published a variety of authors:

- Victor Hugo
- Hedwig Dohm
- Franz Jung
- Leo Tolstoy
- Karl Otten
