= Hosea Jacobi =

Croatian rabbi

Rabbi Hosea Jacobi
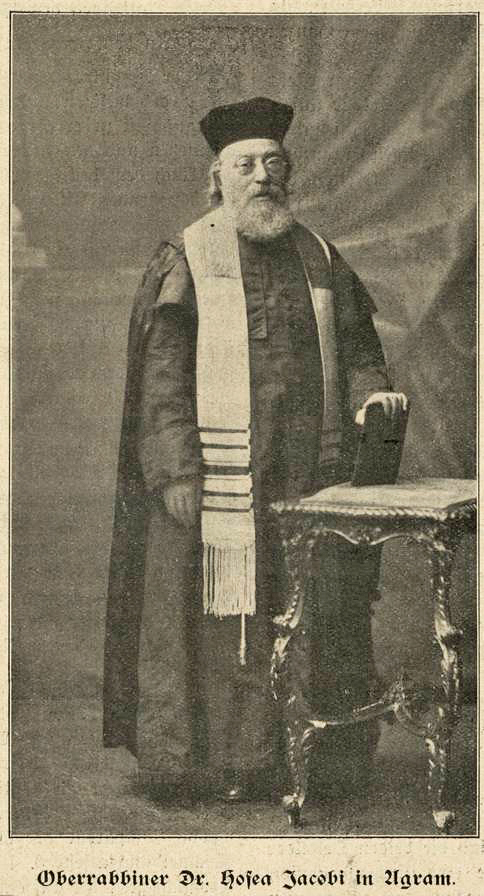

Personal life
- Born: Hosea Hermann Jacoby; 1841 Jacobshagen, Kingdom of Prussia, (now Poland)
- Died: 21 May 1924 (aged 84) Zagreb, Kingdom of Yugoslavia, (now Croatia)
- Buried: Mirogoj Cemetery
- Spouse: Hulda Pander Jacobi
- Children: Dr. Ivan Hans Jacobi; Luise Lea Zaloscer; Selma Strasser; Recha Barmaper; Ivana Johanna (Braun) Jacobi; Martha Spitzer; Clara Barmaper Jacobi
- Parent(s): Mayer and Sara-Miriam (née Goldberg) Jacobi
- Occupation: Chief Rabbi of Croatia and Yugoslavia

Religious life
- Religion: Judaism
- Denomination: Orthodox Judaism
- Profession: Rabbi, Educator

Jewish leader
- Synagogue: Zagreb Synagogue
- Yeshiva: Jewish elementary school Talmud Torah in Zagreb
- Residence: Zagreb

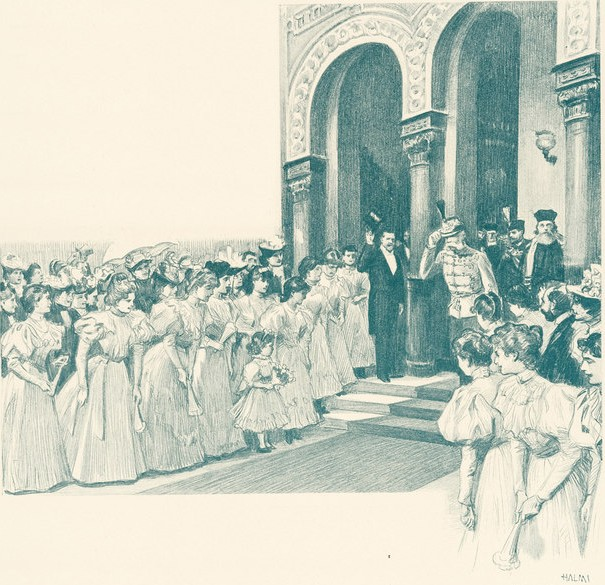
Historic Visit of Emperor Franz Joseph to the Zagreb, Croatia, Synagogue with Rabbi Dr. Hosea Jacobi Chief Rabbi of Yugoslavia (1908) seen behind the emperor on the right

Rabbi Dr. Hosea Jacobi (born Hosea Hermann Jacoby; 1841–1925) was Chief Rabbi of Zagreb, Croatia for 58 years and the de-facto spiritual and religious leader of the Jewish community in Yugoslavia.

== Biography ==
Jacobi was born in Jacobshagen, Kingdom of Prussia (now Poland), the son of the merchant Mayer Jacobi and his wife Sara-Miriam (née Goldberg). His father died when he was ten years old, and his maternal grandfather Rabbi Jacob Moses Goldberg and uncle Rabbi Nachman Abraham Goldberg were his religious instructors.

He attended the Kölnische Gymnasium school in Berlin. A member of the Modern Orthodox Jewish congregation in Berlin, Jacobi was a student of Rabbi Azriel Hildesheimer and Rabbi Elchanan Rosenstein who ordained him. He studied Semitic languages, Hebrew and Theology, in the universities of Berlin and Halle, Saxony-Anhalt (Ph.D. 1865, his dissertation being "De loco feminarum apud Iudaeos antiuissimos maxime matrimonii contrahendi ratione habita" – "The Role of Women in Judaism"). Jacobi married Hulda Pander and had seven children.

In 1867 he became Chief Rabbi of Zagreb, Croatia. Jacobi established and headed, in Zagreb, the Jewish elementary school (Talmud Torah), taught Jewish Studies in high-schools, taught Hebrew and Judaism and established Jewish-Women organizations. He was also active in social welfare projects for the Jewish and General Population in Yugoslavia, for which he was highly respected by the general population and the leaders of other religious denominations. In 1885 Jacobi delivered the first Synagogue-Sermon in the Croat language thus encouraging the integration of Jews into the general population; he also wrote the first ever Jewish-Studies text-books in Croatian. Rabbi Jacobi was president of the Union of Rabbis in Croatia, honorary president of the Union of Rabbis of the Kingdom of Serbs, Croats and Slovenes and president of the branch of Alliance Israélite Universelle in Zagreb.

As a token of appreciation for Rabbi Jacobi’s work, Emperor Franz Joseph visited the synagogue in Zagreb in 1908, accompanied by the rabbi. That was the first and only such historic visit to the Zagreb synagogue.

Jacobi died in Zagreb and was buried at the Mirogoj Cemetery.

=== Family ===
Jacobi's children: his son Dr. Ivan Jacobi, his daughters Luise Zaloscer and Klara Barmaper Jacobi and his son-in-law Dr. Hugo Spitzer were among the prominent leaders of the Jewish community and Zionist Movement in Yugoslavia. Prof. Engr. Giuseppe Leo Guizzi a prominent Italian scholar of Mechanical Enginiring, is one of Rabbi Jacobi's great grandchildren.

His cousin was the Austrian lawyer and politician Dr. Nathan Löwenstein von Opoka (who was the son of his aunt Lina Löwenstein née Goldberg). Another cousin was the physician and philosopher Dr. Oskar Goldberg (son of his uncle Dr. Hosias Goldberg).

== Writings ==
- Ueber die Stellung des Weibes im Judenthum. Vienna, 1865.
- Worauf haben wir bei der Erziehung unserer Kinder zu achten? (Predigt). Zagreb, 1872.
- Was ist der Talmud? und was hat er für Israel gethan? Zagreb, 1880.
- Dereh Hakodeš, Put Svjetlosti (Derech Hakodesch). Zagreb, 1900.
- Biblijska Povjesnica za izraelsku mladež pučkih i nižih srednjih škola. Zagreb, 1923.

== Bibliography ==
- Snješka Knežević, Aleksander Laslo (2011). Židovski Zagreb. Zagreb: AGM, Židovska općina Zagreb. ISBN 978-953-174-393-8.
- Kraus, Ognjen (1998). Dva stoljeća povijesti i kulture Židova u Zagrebu i Hrvatskoj. Zagreb: Židovska općina Zagreb. ISBN 953-96836-2-9.
- Freidenreich, H. P. (1998). The Jews of Yugoslavia. Philadelphia: JPSA. ISBN 978-0827601222.
- Goldstein, Ivo (2005). Židovi u Zagrebu 1918 - 1941. Zagreb: Novi Liber. ISBN 953-6045-23-0.

== See also ==
- History of the Jews in Croatia
- Modern Orthodox Judaism
- Azriel Hildesheimer
- Torah im Derech Eretz
