= Simon Guttmann =

German writer, political commentator, and picture agent (1891–1990)

Wilhelm Simon Guttmann (15 November 1891, Vienna–13 January 1990, London) was a German writer, political commentator, and managing director of picture agencies who inspired significant photographers including Robert Capa, Maria Eisner, Felix Mann and Kurt Hutton.

== Germany ==
Simon Guttmann was active together with Walter Benjamin in the German Youth Movement, Die deutsche Jugendbewegung. He was friends with the painters of the German Expressionists of Die Brücke, especially with Ernst Ludwig Kirchner, was the founder of the literary magazine Neue Weltbühne and wrote some literary articles in early Expressionist magazines.

From 1909 to 1912 Guttmann participated in Der Neue Club ('The New club') and the resulting Neopathetic Cabaret of the Berlin Expressionists scene, which was directed by Kurt Hiller and founded in 1909 near the Hackescher Markt. Guttmann accelerated a connection between the Brücke artists and this circle.

In 1912, together with David Baumgardt, Erwin Loewenson, Jakob van Hoddis and Robert Jentzsch, he was one of the editors of the posthumous poems of Georg Heym, published in 1910 and introduced in The New club. Together with Franz Jung he published the appeal "Save Otto Gross!" in the Munich magazine Revolution in 1913 and took part in the campaign to free him.

== Switzerland ==
During the First World War he emigrated to Switzerland and belonged to the Zürich Dadaist circle in the Grand Café Odeon; together with Wieland Herzfelde he was involved with the Spartacists, before in 1920 he became one of the founders of the Communist Workers' Party of Germany. In 1923 he lived for two weeks with Ossip and Lilja Brik in Moscow and also met Mayakovsky there, after which he brought the first Soviet films to Berlin. In 1927 he was co-director of Curt Oertel on the film sequences for the premiere of Ernst Toller's play Hoppla, wir leben! produced by Erwin Piscator at the Berlin Theatre and starring Alexander Granach in the lead role.

== Photo agencies ==
In 1928 Guttmann founded the press photo agency Dephot together with Alfred Marx as financier, where Maria Eisner, founder of Alliance Photo and Magnum agencies, and Kurt Hutton, one of the founding staff of the groundbreaking pictorial weekly news magazine Picture Post, received their training.

In 1933 Guttmann emigrated to France and later to London, where he ran his own press photo agency Report. In 1935, after emigrating to Paris, he sent his disciple Endre Friedmann (aka Robert Capa) who later became famous, to Spain to produce reportage on the Civil War. In the early 1950s, Inge Morath completed her final internship with him in London before she started working for Magnum in 1953. From 1961 to 1969 Guttmann worked with Romano Cagnoni on photo reports for major British daily newspapers and magazines. He set up Report and IFL in Oxford Street with Helen Warby featuring many photographers including Alan Vines, Romano Cagnoni, Patrick Eagar, Carlos Augusto, Stefano Cagnoni, Chris Davies, Mary Elgin, Bente Fasmer, Peter Harrap, John Harris, Tessa Howland, Alex Low, Rick Matthews, Nick Oakes, Angela Phillips, Mark Rusher, John Smith, Laurie Sparham, Derek Speirs, John Sturrock and Andrew Wiard amongst others, until his death in January 1990 aged 99 years. The Report IFL Archive is now represented online by Report digital: https://www.reportdigital.co.uk/home
