= Opatów (disambiguation) =

Opatów may refer to the following places:

- Opatów, Greater Poland Voivodeship (west-central Poland)
- Opatów, Silesian Voivodeship (south Poland)
- Opatów in Świętokrzyskie Voivodeship (south-central Poland)
