= Ernst Blass =

German expressionist writer

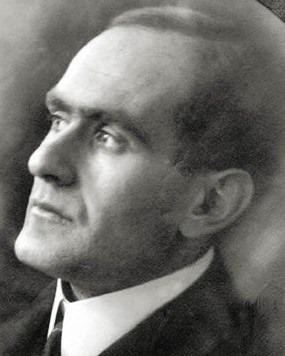
Image of Ernst Blass

Ernst Blass (17 October 17, 1890, in Berlin – 23 January 23, 1939 in Berlin, (pseudonyms: Daniel Stabler and Erich Sternow) was an important expressionist poet, critic and writer.

Blass was a close friend of Kurt Hiller and joined him at Der Neue Club, alongside other writers of early Expressionism, Georg Heym and Jakob van Hoddis. From 1911, he collaborated with the magazine Die Aktion, before distancing himself from Franz Pfemfert in 1914.

In Das Wesen der neuen Tanzkunst (The essence of the new dance art) Blass set out to identify abstract categories whereby "a new dance art" could be outlined. He described how the anthroposophical breathing methods taught at Loheland could transform the "marionette" into an animal form which could then leap in an ecstatic manner. In this he was responding to previous theories of dance, such as produced by Heinrich von Kleist who had written in 1807 a short text "Über dem Marionette Theater" according to which the dancer became a marionnette without either will or consciousness.

In 1980 Thomas B. Schumann published a three volume collection of Blass' poetry (Volume 1), short stories (Volume 2) and various essays (Volume 3).

== Works ==
- 1912 Die Straßen komme ich entlang geweht
- 1915 Die Gedichte von Trennung und Licht
- 1918 Die Gedichte von Sommer und Tod
- 1920 Über den Stil Stefan Georges
- 1921 Das Wesen der neuen Tanzkunst
- 1930 Der paradiesische Augenblick
