= Der Neue Club =

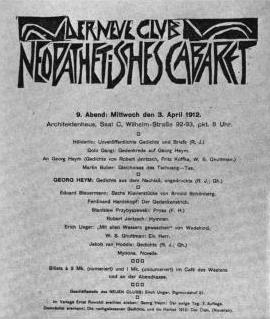

Der Neue Club was an Expressionist club founded in the Hackesche Höfe courtyards, Berlin by Kurt Hiller and Jakob van Hoddis.

== The Neopathetic Cabaret ==
The Neopathetic Cabaret was a short-lived by influential event held at Der Neue Club with a total of nine events over two years. The cabaret soon attracted a group of poets and writers such as Simon Guttmann, Georg Heym, Erich Unger, Ernst Blass and Else Lasker-Schüler.
