= Berenice Sydney =

British artist (1944–1983)

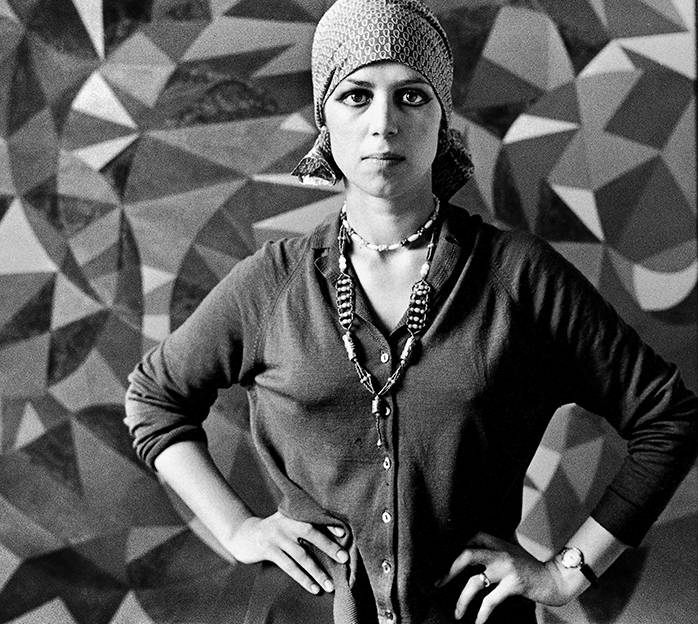
- Sydney in front of one of her paintings, London, 1972 (Photograph by Romano Cagnoni)
- Born: Berenice Frieze; 1944; Esher, Surrey, England
- Died: 1983 (aged 38–39)
- Known for: Painting, printmaking
- Spouse: Romano Cagnoni (m. 1970; div. 1983)

Berenice Sydney (1944–1983), born Berenice Frieze, and professionally known as 'Berenice', was a British artist who produced a substantial body of work from 1964 onwards. Her oeuvre consists of paintings on canvas and paper, drawings, prints, children's books, costume design and performance. A memorial exhibition of her work was held at the Royal Academy in 1984 followed by solo shows in Italy, Abu Dhabi, Bahrain, Switzerland and Britain. Her work continues to be featured in print and watercolour shows held in Burlington House. Her work is in over 100 private and public collections.

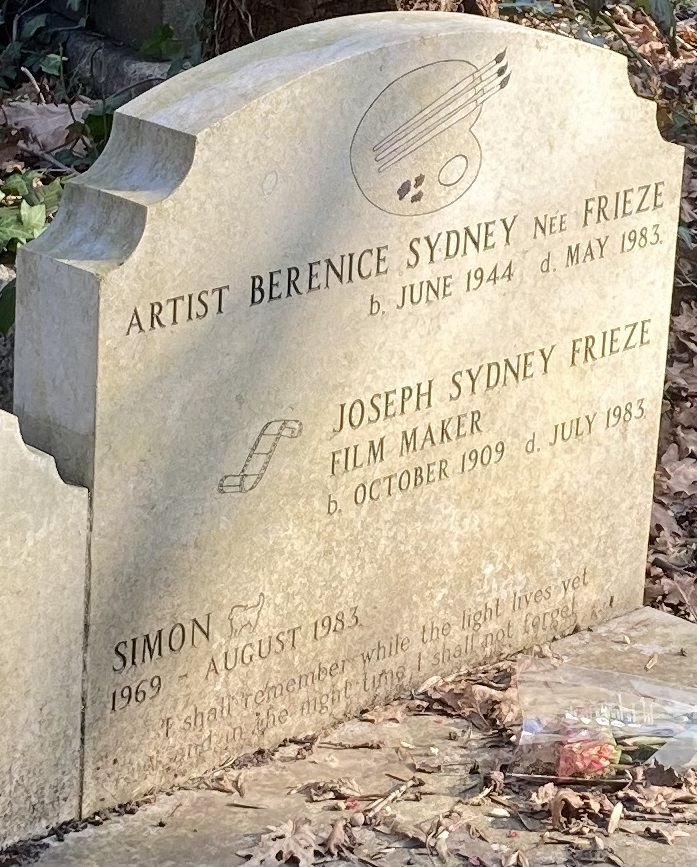
Grave of Berenice Sydney in Highgate Cemetery (east side)

== Biography ==
Berenice Sydney was born in Esher, Surrey in 1944 and educated at the Lycée Français Charles de Gaulle in London. From her early years, she studied ballet with Marie Rambert and classical guitar with Adele Kramer. As an adult, she balanced her studio work with training at the Dance Centre in the Royal Opera House and attending flamenco dance studios in Hampstead and New York City. Berenice was married to the Italian photographer Romano Cagnoni from 1970 until they divorced in February 1983.

In addition to reading the classics and studying mythology, she was fluent in five languages. She was enrolled at the Central School of Art and Design but left formal art education to set up a studio in Chelsea.

She participated in over 40 exhibitions before her death of an asthma attack at the age of 38. She is buried in the eastern section of Highgate Cemetery. Her father, the documentary filmmaker Joseph Sydney Frieze, died a few months later and is buried with her. Lord McAlpine gave the eulogy at her funeral which was also attended by Dr. David Brown then the Assistant Keeper in Modern Collections at the Tate Gallery.

== Career ==
Berenice Sydney was included in ten group exhibitions between 1963 and 1975 and held eleven solo shows, in addition to being invited to represent Britain at the Biennale della Grafica d'Arte in Florence in 1974. The following year she showed her "stained-glass effect" canvases at the McAlpine Gallery of the Ashmolean Museum.

Her first professional exhibition was held at the Drian Galleries in 1968 and included Susanna and the Elders with Charlie the Pigeon, Coffee Pot and 3 Yellow Flowers and The Drummer Boy.

She began to exhibit her works on paper including Dancing Nymphs, Hermaphroditus, Pan and Two Nymphs, The Marriage of Psyche and Eros, Naiads Surprised by Satyrs, in 1968. Linocuts were also exhibited that year and included Aphrodite and Ares, Nymphs Dancing, Psyche and Eros, Nude Fiddling with Toe, Pan and Two Nymphs and Hebe and Artemis. She continued to explore themes relating to Persian mythology, Christian symbolism and Greek mythological subjects as well as referencing Ancient Egyptian art, creating a hieroglyph of her professional name and working on papyrus.

Responding to the exhibition Salute to Berenice Sydney held at the Royal Academy Max Wykes-Joyce wrote:

In the Spring of 1968 I was much charmed by a first one-person show at the Drian Galleries of large, lively paintings which evidenced the artist's interest in dance and music, and a group of black and white drawings on mythological themesm [sic?] made in her late teens and very early twenties by the young self-taught Berenice Sydney. I praised them greatly: subesequently [sic?] show of her work were in turn singled out for admiration in Arts Review by Marina Vaizey, Pat Gilmour, Oswell Baakeston and Charles Bone. And these praises were more recently joined by those of Kenneth Garlick of the Ashmolean Museum and David Brown of the Tate Gallery. Her painting evolved from figuration to an apparent abstraction which was, in truth, a dance of colours, an expression of natural exuberance. She was continually researching new means of printmaking and mixed media works, each kind of which is represented in this, her memorial exhibition.

=== Painting ===
Sydney's work developed from representational to semi-abstract, and she soon established her style in purest abstract form starting with tiny delicate Persian Garden designs, miniatures in naturalistic colours that become abstract etchings: Bakhtiari, The Sultan's Garden, Shirvan Kabistan II, Hachly Moons, Little Squares, Saruk, which were exhibited in 1969.

From 1973 her oils on canvas also began to develop into conceptual abstractions. From discernible figures worked in flowing brush strokes her forms became multi-faceted describing movement in hundreds of colour mutations and shapes. Sydney's later paintings were developed in series, based on specific organic forms, such as leaves (see illustration), that provided a dynamic structural frame for the buildup of paint across large canvasses. Colour combined with vortex-like compositions, starting from a central point to expand outwards, enabled the artist to explore the kinesthetic qualities of visual experience in a way that relates to Bridget Riley's later work.

=== Printmaking ===
Sydney continued to experiment in oils and other media and produced etching, engravings in steel (Art in Steel exhibition 1972), copper and perspex monoprints. One of her influences was Stanley William Hayter and her etchings would then use multiple colours on a single plate. She also produced aquatints and lithographs using one plate for each colour process. Her work in serigraphy was also extensive and first exhibited in 1974.

=== Drawing ===
Sydney's drawing consistently used acrylic and oil pastels, ink and brush creating a series of works on Gemini paper. She produced a series of intensely detailed pen drawings merging the calligraphic with the figurative in a humorous way, as in Pen drawing with Jester, 1976.

=== Children's books ===
Sydney wrote and illustrated a Book of Nonsense Verse 1982/3 later titled Book of Fools which she dedicated to the First of April. A page from this work featuring the poem The Ant who Danced and Pranced is featured in the catalogue to the exhibition Homage to Berenice Sydney. In it the art historian, Florian Rodari's appraisal of Sydney's work appears in French with a translation in English by Charlotte Frieze. The black and white illustrations to the Book of Fools are aquatints etched in a delicately delineated style. The text is written in French and English. Four artist's proofs of the book subsequently titled Book of Fools were printed. The French version of A Book of Fools was purchased by the Bibliothèque Nationale Paris in October 1982 in addition to a number of the artist's earliest etchings, now kept in the Cabinet des Estampes. An audio cassette recording of the artist giving a reading of the Book of Fools was made at the Musée d'Elysée in Lausanne as the artist performed with castanets, accompanied by Gypsy Flamenco musicians and rendered in parts with a Yorkshire accent in homage to her father's family origins.

== Exhibitions ==
Exhibitions during her lifetime 1968–1982

1968

- Drian Galleries, First One Person Show, London
- Leicester Galleries, - Group Show, London
- Edinburgh Festival Costume Designs for Workshops Production of Clown - Televised, Grampian Productions
- Magdelene Street Gallery. Group Show, Cambridge
- 1969 Traverse Theatre Gallery, Group Show, Edinburgh
- Lumley Cazalet Gallery, Group Show, London
- Camden Arts Centre Group Show, London
- Tib Lane Gallery, Group Show, Manchester
- Royal Institute Galleries, Group Show F.I.B.A., London WI

1971

- International Student House, One Person Show, London
- Leicester Galleries. Group Show, London WI
- Richard Demarco Gallery, Group Show, Edinburgh
- Tib Lane Gallery, Group Show, Manchester

1972

- Galleria Stellaria One Person Show, Florence
- Zella 9 Gallery, Group Show, London
- Art in Steel Exhibition, Group Show, Millbank, London
- F.B.A. Galleries, Group Show, London SWI
- Magdelene Gallery, Group Show, Cambridge

1973

- Christopher Drake Gallery, Group Show, London
- Kenwood House Museum, Two Person Show, London, mounted by the Greater London Council
- Bear Lane Gallery, One Person Show, Oxford
- Van Dyke Gallery. One Person Show, Bristol University
- Bibliothèque Nationale de France, Group Show, Paris
- Artists from Five Continents" Group Show, Swiss Cottage Central Library

1974

- Education Gallery, One Person Show, Leeds City Art Gallery
- Willis Museum and Art Gallery. One Person Show, Basingstoke
- Biennale della Grafica d'Arte, Florence, Italy representing Great Britain
- Haworth Art Gallery, Accrington, One Person Show

1975

- McAlpine Gallery, One Person Show, Ashmolean Museum, Oxford
- County Museum, One Person Show, Warwick
- Museum and Art Gallery. Three Person Show, Leicester
- Galleria d'Arte, One Person Show, Milan
- St Catherine's College, Oxford One Person Show, Oxford
- Trinity College, Oxford. One Person Show
- Leicester Museum & Art Gallery. Prints

1976

- Biennale Européan de la gravure, Group Show, Mulhouse
- Galeria Peters, Group Show, Buenos Aires
- Gallery of Modern Art, Two Person Show, Buenos Aires
- Cardiff University, One Person Show, Cardiff
- Leeds Art Gallery, Series of 6 lectures and demonstrations of etching techniques

1982

- The Society of Graphic Artists
- Hampstead Artists Council
- Free Painters and Sculptors
- Chelsea Art Society

Posthumous exhibitions 1984 onward

1984

- Salute to Berenice Royal Academy. One Person Show, London
- Exhibition of British Art, Abu Dhabi Group Show
- Exhibition of British Art, Gulf of Bahrain, Group Show
- British Council Paris, Group Show
- Centenary Exhibition, Leicestershire Museum and Art Gallery, Group Show

1985

- Homage à Berenice Sydney, Edwin Engelberts Galerie d'Art Contemporain, One Person Show, Geneva

1986

- Christmas Exhibition' Lumley Cazalet Fine Art, Group Show, London

1987

- Berenice Sydney, Gallery of British Contemporary Art, One Person Show, Lausanne

1988

- Berenice Sydney, La Galerie Michel Foex, Geneva, Watercolour painting, One Person Show

1989

- Women in Art, Bowmoore Gallery, Group Show, London

1990

- Contemporary British Artists, Waterman Fine Art, Group Show, London

1991

- The London Original Print Fair, Royal Academy of Art, London

Represented by Lumley Cazalet

- From Fautrier to Rainer, La Galerie Michel Foex, Group Show, Geneva,

including Henri Michaux, Brice Marden, Ben Nicholson, Jean Fautrier 1992

- Homage to the British Artist Berenice Sydney, Galerie Nelly L'Epattenier, One Person Show, Lausanne

1993

- Homage à Berenice, L'Exemplaire, Geneva, One Person Show
- The London Original Print Fair, The Royal Academy of Art, Represented by Peter Black

1994

- Berenice Sydney, L'Exemplaire, Geneva, One Person Show

1995

- Art'95 Contemporary British Art Fair, London
- Milan, Book Print Fair Group
- The Chelsea Art Society Group Exhibition
- A private exhibition of rare and original European prints 18th-20th century at Austin Desmonds, Campbell Fine Art
- Magnat Gallery, London

1996

- L'Exemplaire, Geneva, One person show

1998

- Girls, Girls, Girls, Deborah Bates Gallery, London

2002

- Group show, La Galerie Michel Foex, Geneva, including Ben Nicholson, Rachel Whiteread

2006

- Watercolours and Drawings Fair, James Kinmont Fine Art and John Iddon Fine Art, Royal Academy, London
- Chelsea Art Fair, John Iddon Fine Art, Royal Hospital, Chelsea, London
- Exhibition 9 paintings from the Orbit series, Modern British Artists, London

2008

- Watercolours and Drawings Fair, Modern Works on Paper, James Kinmont Fine Art, Royal Academy, London
- Chelsea Art Fair, John Iddon Fine Art, Chelsea Old Town Hall, London

2010

- 20/21 British Art Fair, John Iddon Fine Art, Royal College of Art, London

== Public collections ==
=== Museums and galleries ===
- The British Museum, London
- The Victoria and Albert Museum, London
- The Tate Gallery, London
- The British Council, London
- The Ashmolean Museum, Oxford
- The Bibliothèque nationale de France, Paris
- Museum Boijmans Van Beuningen, Rotterdam
- The Royal Library of Belgium Brussels
- The Uffizi Gallery, Florence
- Galleria M. Arte Moderna, Bologna
- The Phillips Collection, Washington
- The National Library of Congress, Washington
- The Smithsonian Institution, Washington
- Philadelphia Museum of Art
- Fogg Art Museum, Harvard University
- Menil Collection, Houston, Texas
- Smith College Museum of Art, Northampton, USA
- Brooklyn Museum of Art, New York
- Capital Nacional de la Nautica, Buenos Aires
- Graphische Sammlung der ETH, Zürich, Switzerland
- New York Public Library New York, USA
- Jenisch Collection, Musée Cantonale, Vevey, Switzerland
- Victoria Art Gallery, Bath
- City Art Gallery, Bradford
- Museum and Art Gallery, Bolton
- Cecil Higgins Art Gallery and Bedford Museum
- County Museum, Derby
- Towner Art Gallery, Eastbourne
- City Art Gallerv, Glasgow
- Laing Art Gallery, Newcastle upon Tyne
- Leicester City Gallery
- Graves Art Gallery, Sheffield
- Walker Art Gallery, Liverpool
- City Museum & Art Gallery, Newport
- Reading College & School of Arts and Design now Thames Valley University
- Luton Museum & Art Gallery, Luton
- South London Gallery
- Museum of Reading
- Newnham City Collection
- City Art Gallery, Wakefield
- Humberside Education Services
- Humberside Leisure Services
- Batley Library
- Rochdale Libraries Art Services
- Museum & Art Gallery, Rochdale
- Durham County Council
- Norwich Castle Museum
- Nonsuch High School
- Cecil Higgins Gallery, Bedford
- Museum and Art Gallery, Oldham
- Usher Gallery, Lincoln
- Portsmouth City Art Gallery

=== Public and university collections ===
- University of Sussex
- University of Manchester
- Cardiff University
- University of Bristol
- University of Bath
- University of Glasgow
- University of Cardiff
- University of Lancaster
- University of Sheffield
- University of Salford
- Bristol Education Authority
- Leeds Education Department
- Reading Education Department
- Derbyshire County Council
- Inner London Education Department (ILEA)
- Royal Brompton and Harefield NHS Trust
- St Thomas' Hospital, London
- St Mary's Hospital, London
- Bingley & Havering County Council
- London Borough of Bromley
- Education Office, Preston
- Lancashire County Council
- Nottingham Education Committee

=== Corporate and commercial collections ===
- James Walter Thompson London
- First National Bank of Boston
- Chase Manhattan Bank
- Stellaria Galleria, Florence
- Pallas Gallery
- Lumley Cazalet Gallery
- Bear Lane Gallery, Oxford
- Drian Galleries, London
- Butler Miller
- Wilkin Warburton
- World Graphics
- Hilton Hotels

=== Private collections ===
- John Jacobs, Curator of Historic Museums and Director of the Iveagh Bequest Kenwood House London
- Galeria Peters, Buenos Aires, Argentina
- Private Collections, San Francisco, California, USA
- Private Collection, Washington D.C., USA
- Private Collection, Los Angeles, California, USA
- Private Collection, New York City, USA
- Private Collection, Geneva, Switzerland
- Patrick Cramer, Geneva, Switzerland
- Michel Foex, Geneva, Switzerland
- Darius Dabatabay, Geneva, Switzerland
- Lady Noel Annesly, England
- Christopher Johnston Collection, England
- Mr. and Mrs. Hariton Embiricos, Greece
- Sueo Mitsuma, Tokyo
- Lord Alistair McAlpine, England
- Linda Talbot, England
- 4 Private Collections, Sydney, Australia
