= Hackesche Höfe =

Courtyard complex in Berlin

Coordinates: 52°31′27″N 13°24′08″E

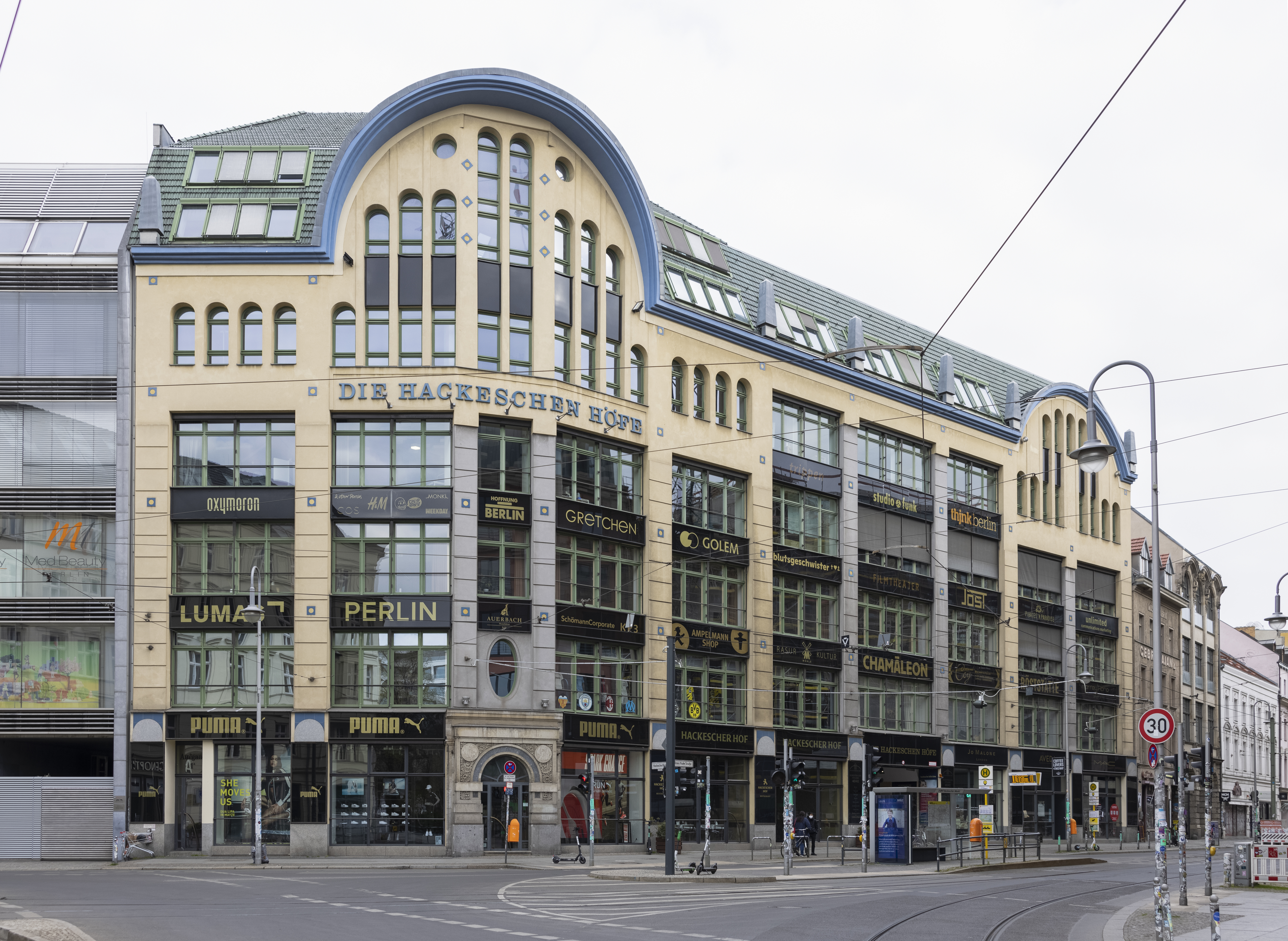
The Hackesche Höfe from Hackescher Markt

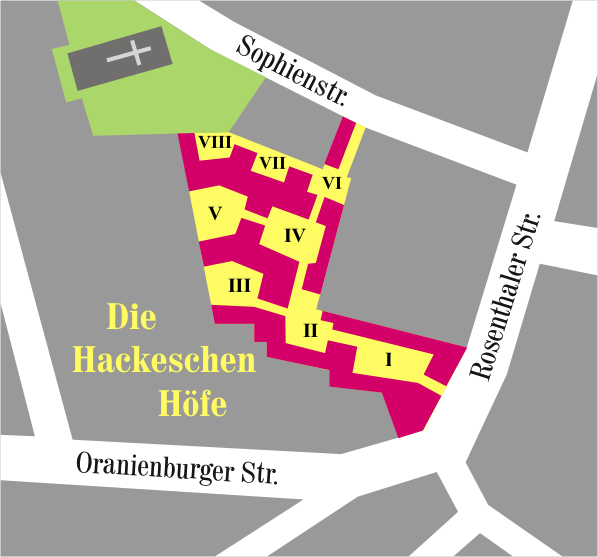
Plan of the complex

The Hackesche Höfe (English: Hacke's Courtyards) is a notable courtyard complex situated adjacent to the Hackescher Markt in the centre of Berlin. The complex consists of eight interconnected courtyards, accessed through a main arched entrance at number 40 Rosenthaler Straße.

The complex was designed in the Jugendstil (or Art Nouveau) style by August Endell, and the first courtyard is adorned with a magnificent facade of polychrome glazed brick. The construction of this project, launched in 1906, follows a pattern of clear separation between residential areas, crafts, trade and culture, which distinguishes it from the courtyards of the 19th century.

In 1909 Kurt Hiller and Jakob van Hoddis established Der Neue Club here which hosted such events as the literary evenings they called the Neopathetisches Cabaret (Neo-pathetic Cabaret). These proved to be very popular, often attracting hundreds of spectators. There is a plaque commemorating van Hoddis as one of the victims of National Socialism at the Hackesche Höfe.

== Gallery ==
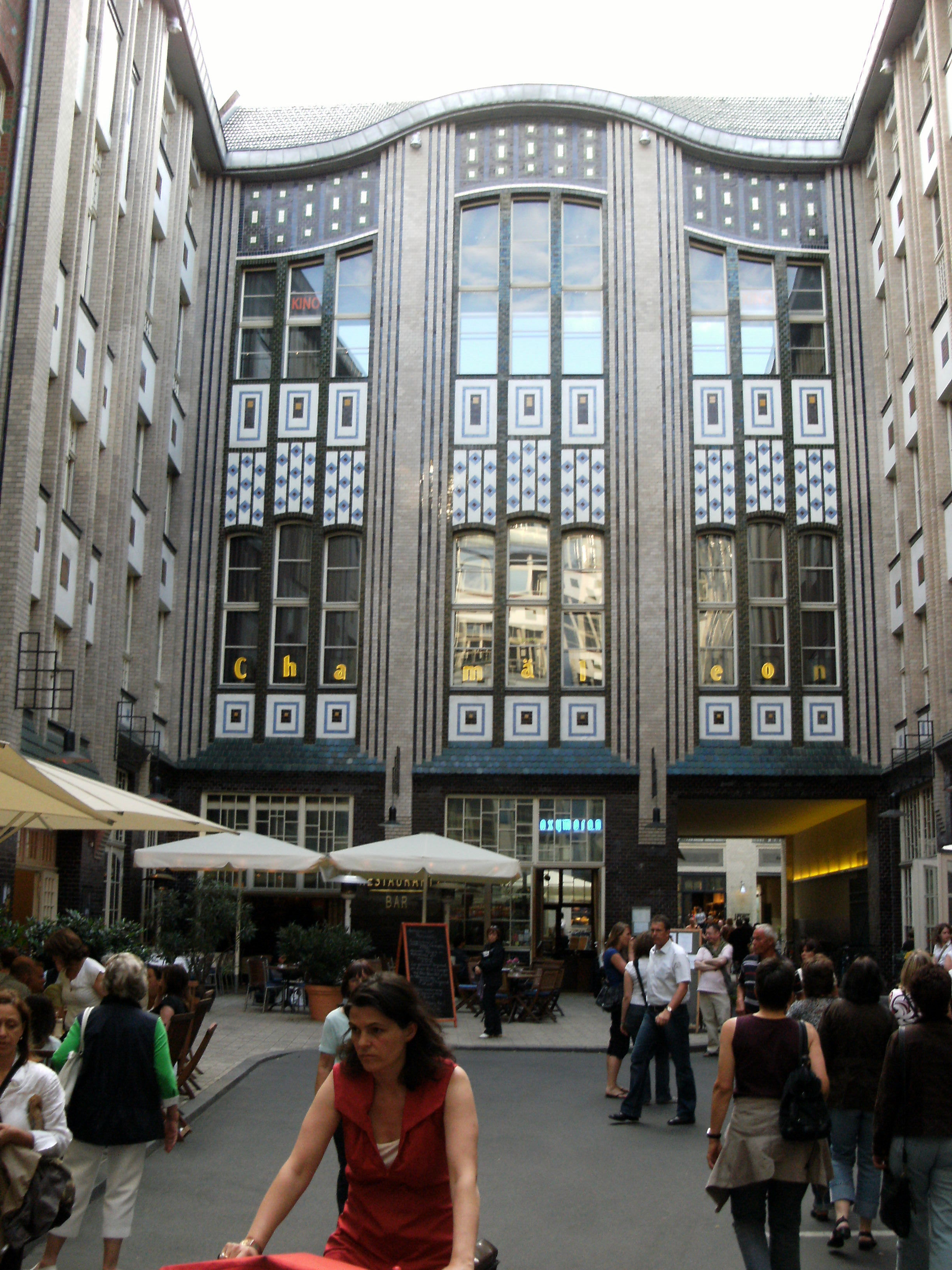

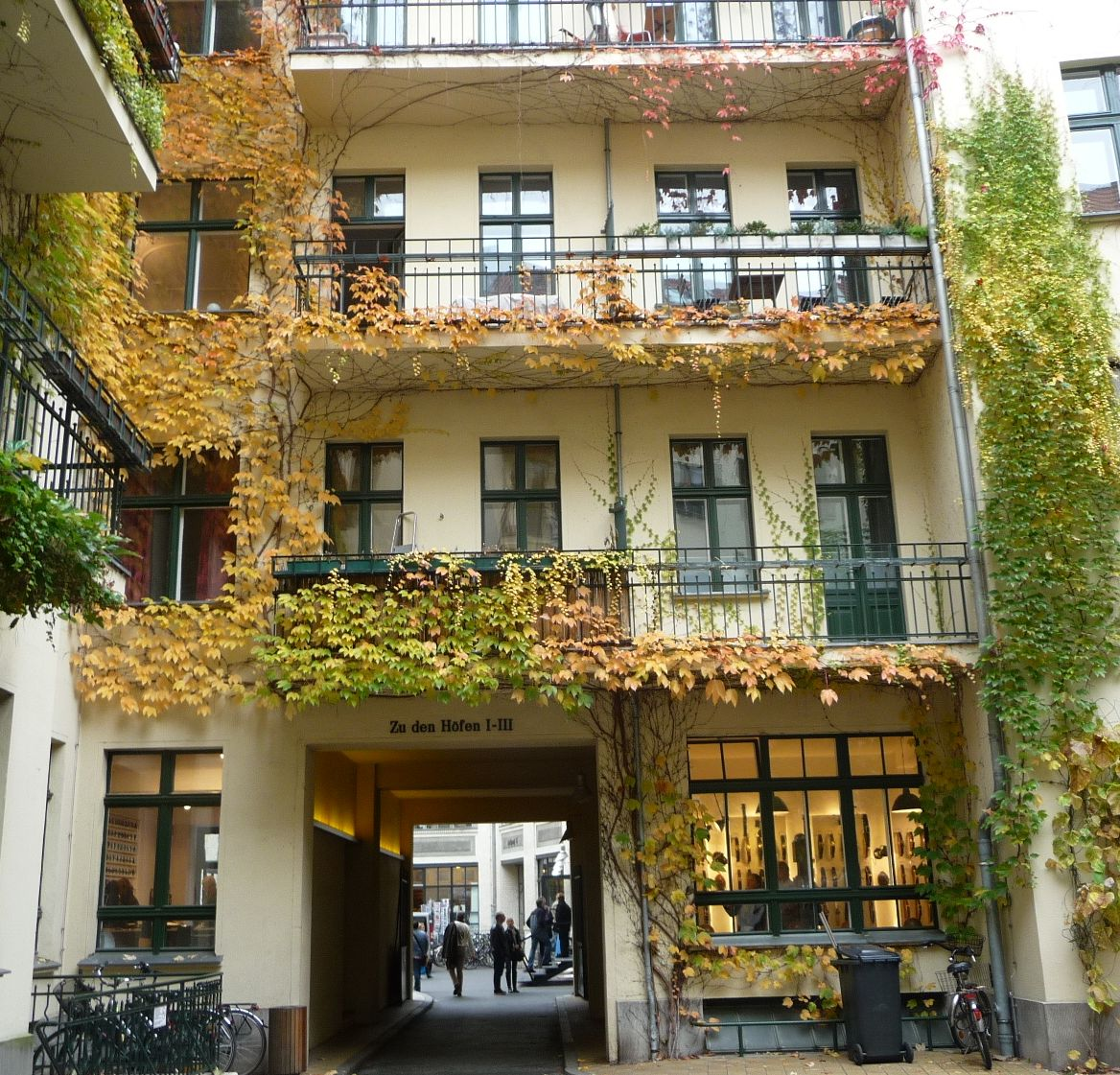

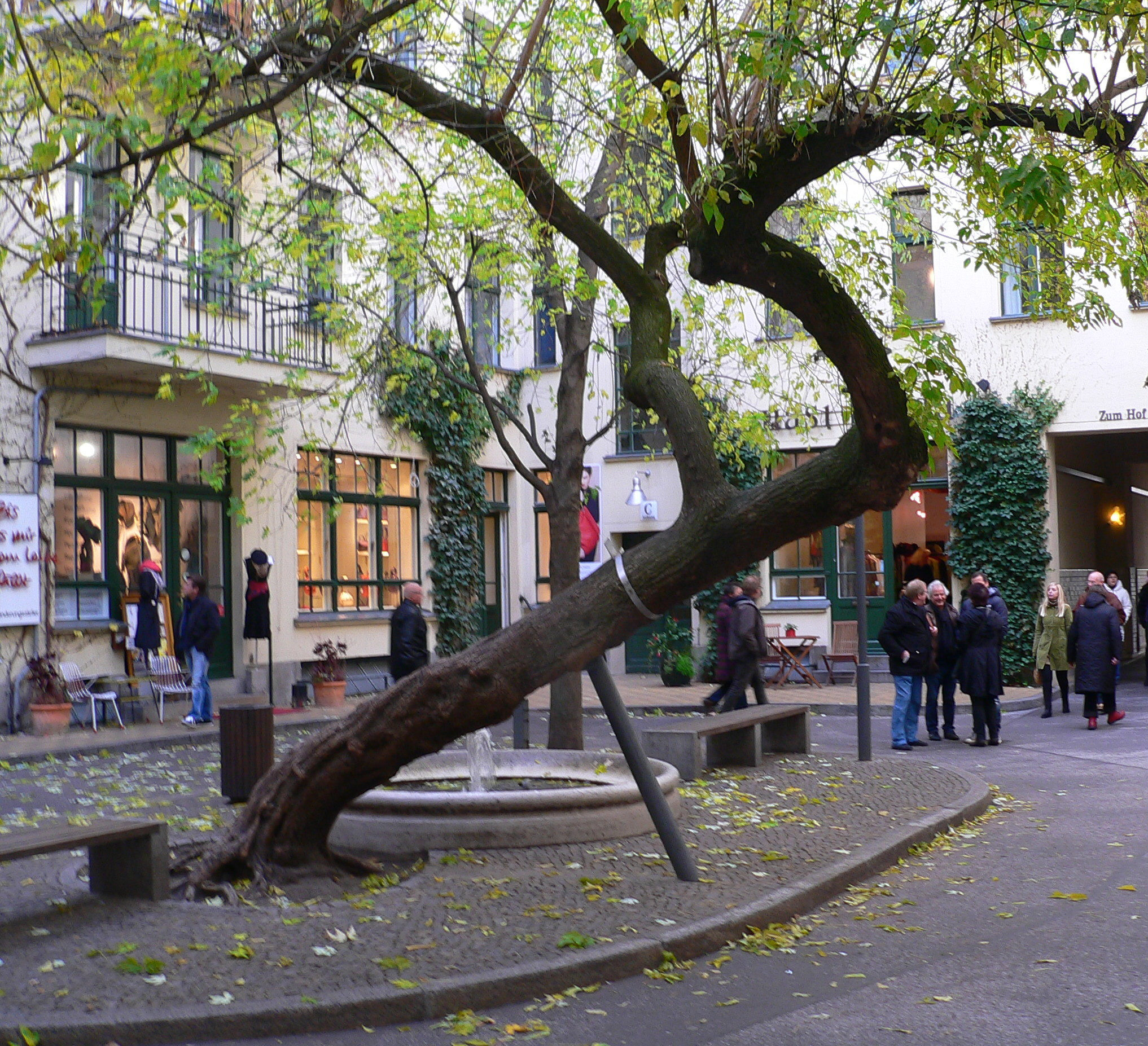

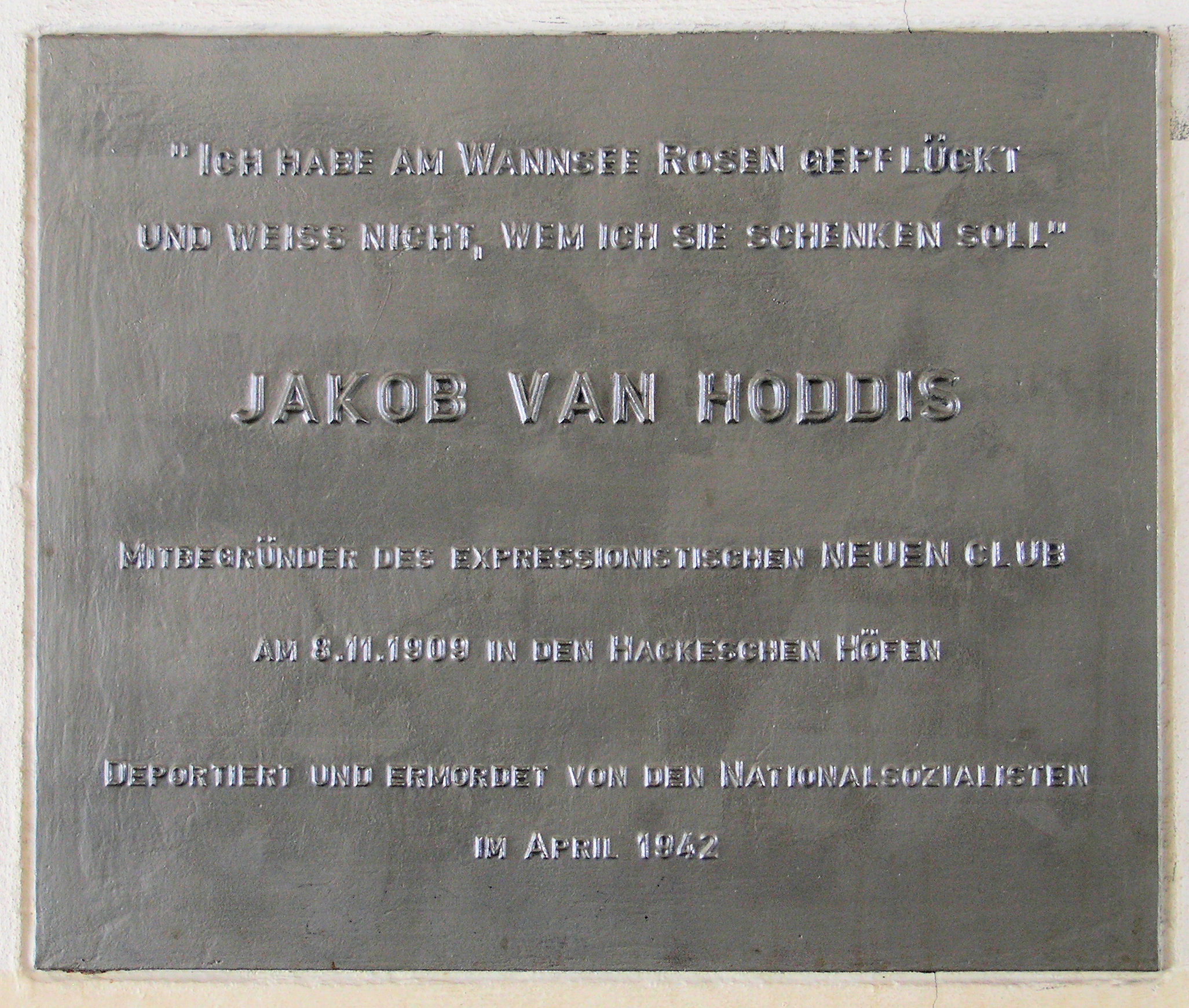
Memorial plaque to Jakob van Hoddis
