= Friederike Kempner =

German-Jewish poet

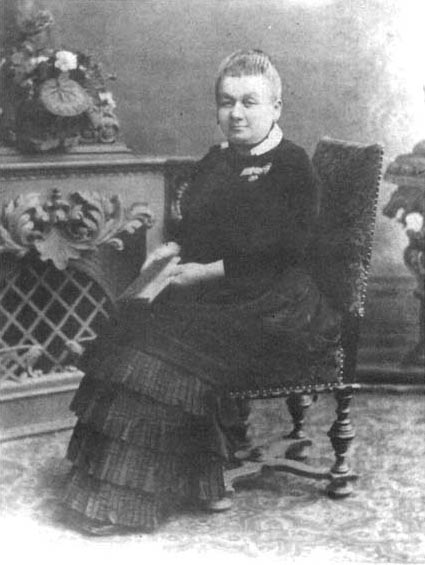
Friederike Kempner

Friederike Kempner (25 June 1828 – 23 February 1904) was a German-Jewish poet.

The daughter of a well-off family from Kępno (German: Kempen), Kempner was born in Opatów, then part of the Prussian Grand Duchy of Posen (today Poland). In 1844, her father purchased a manor (Rittergut) in Droschkau, Silesia, where she and her siblings spent a sheltered youth. By her mother, she received education in the French language, literature, and the Jewish Enlightenment. In 1864, she was able to establish her own residence at a family estate called Friederikenhof (Gierczyce) near Reichthal (Rychtal), where she wrote many of her works. By her niece Doris Davidsohn, née Kempner, she was the great-aunt of Jakob van Hoddis.

The death of both her parents in 1868 had a lasting effect on Kempner's work. Early in life, she developed an interest in general humanitarian questions, especially in hygiene, as well as in reforms of the prison system and the abolition of solitary confinement. Suffering from taphophobia like many of her contemporaries, she urgently advocated the introduction of morgues and a waiting time in cases of suspended animation. Kempner left a comprehensive oeuvre of pamphlets, as well as several novellas and theatre plays which, however, remained largely unheeded by literary critics.

Some of her exalted poems attained notoriety for their unintentional humor; she was mocked as "The Silesian Swan" by editors like Paul Lindau and many parodies were created which later were occasionally even attributed to Kempner herself. This "literary heritage" prompted the author and critic Alfred Kempner (not a direct relative) to adopt the surname Kerr in 1887. In 1905 Sigmund Freud mocked the "involuntary comedy" of her poetry in "The Joke and Its Relation to the Unconscious," tr. Joyce Crick. London: Penguin, 2002, 208-09.

Friedrike Kempner remained unmarried. Some years before her death she was stricken with blindness. She died at her Friederikenhof manor and is buried in the Old Jewish Cemetery, Wrocław.

== Literary works ==
- Gedichte, 2d ed., Breslau, 1852 (frequently republished)
- Novellen, 1861
- Denkschrift über die Nothwendigkeit einer Gesetzlichen Einführung von Leichenhäusern), 1867 (republished five times)
- Nettelbeck als Patriot und Kosmopolit, a novel, 1868

Dramas

- Berenice, 1860
- Rudolf der Zweite, 1867
- Antigonos, 1880
