= Friedrich Wilhelm Gymnasium =

Secondary school in Berlin

Location
- Berlin; Germany

Information
- School type: Gymnasium
- Established: 1747

The Friedrich Wilhelm Gymnasium (or Friedrich-Wilhelms-Gymnasium) was a secondary school (Gymnasium) in Berlin.

== History ==
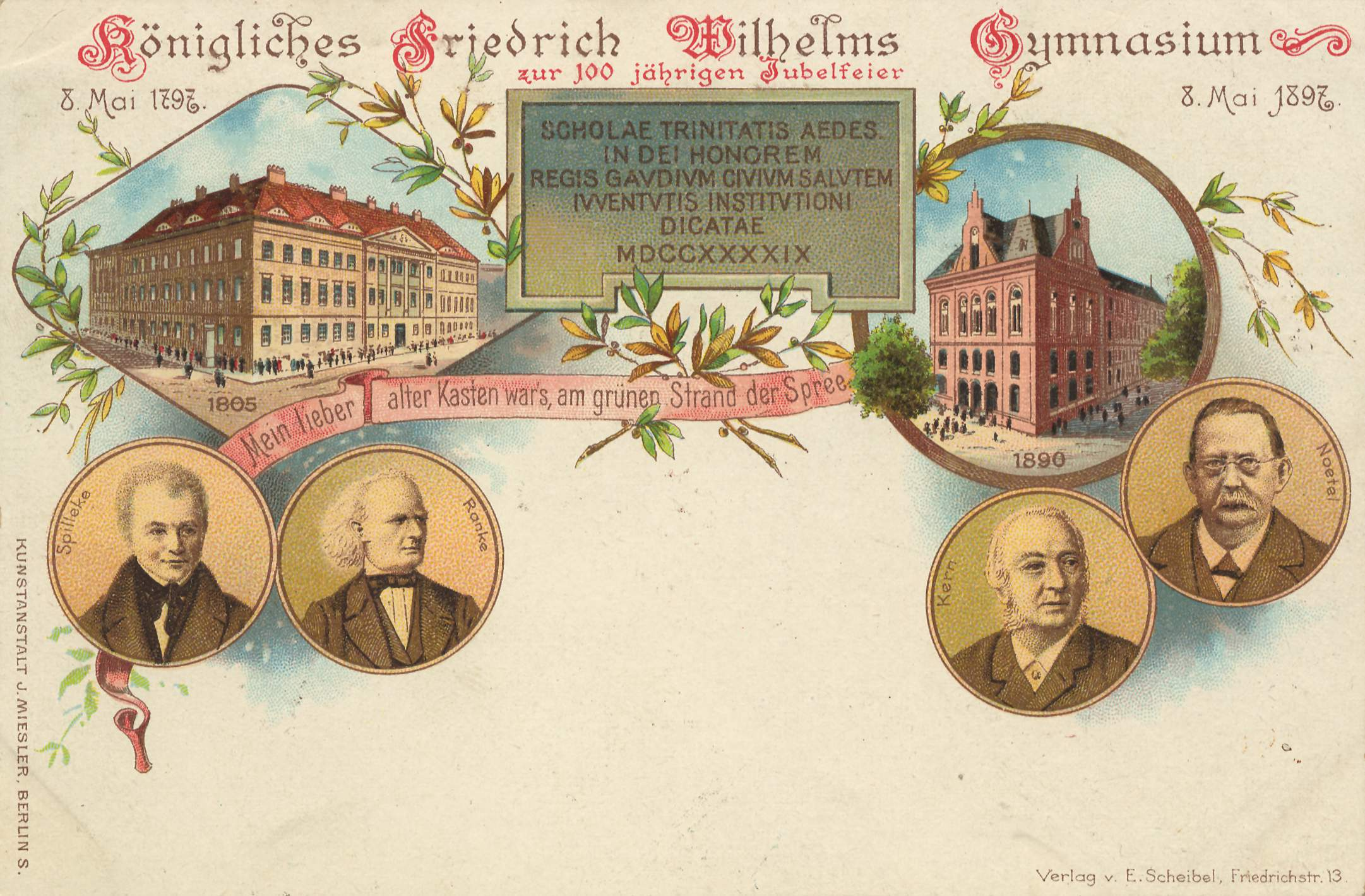
Postcard celebrating the centenary of the Friedrich Wilhelm school

The school originated from a Realschule founded by the Pietist Johann Julius Hecker in 1747, the first secondary school in Berlin. On its 50th anniversary in 1797, the school was renamed after Friedrich Wilhelm III, who had succeeded his father as King of Prussia earlier in that year, and wanted to improve the successful secondary school. He gave additional funds for an additional building to house the expanded school.

The Friedrich Wilhelm Gymnasium buildings were located on Kochstrasse in Berlin's Friedrichstadt district. The grammar school was located on Kochstrasse at the corner of Friedrichstrasse 41 until 1890 (demolished) when it was relocated to a new building at Kochstrasse 13 (south side), built according to plans by building officer Friedrich Schulze from 1888 to 1890. The Realgymnasium and Elisabeth School were located at Kochstrasse 66 and 65 (north side), respectively.

After World War I, the school was slated to be closed and the buildings abandoned. However, the parents and parents' council managed to save it, and plan for an entirely new school building as well. The new building was completed in 1929 and was built according to plans by building officer Heinrich Beckmann in Zwillingestraße for around 1.5 million marks.

All buildings were destroyed in World War II.

== Notable students ==
- Bruno Bauer
- Adolf von Baeyer
- Hans von Beseler
- Otto von Bismarck
- Max von Boehn
- Georg Bohlmann
- Richard Bohn
- Alexander Duncker
- Kurt Hensel
- Otto Hellwig
- Paul Heyse
- Jakob van Hoddis
- James Israel
- Wolfgang Kapp
- Johannes Lepsius
- Karl Marx
- Arnold Mendelssohn
- Friedrich August Berthold Nitzsch
- Ernst Posner
- Wilhelm von Radziwill
- Paul Tillich
- Rudolf Schlechter
- Rudolf Wittkower
