= Romano Cagnoni =

Italian photographer (1935–2018)

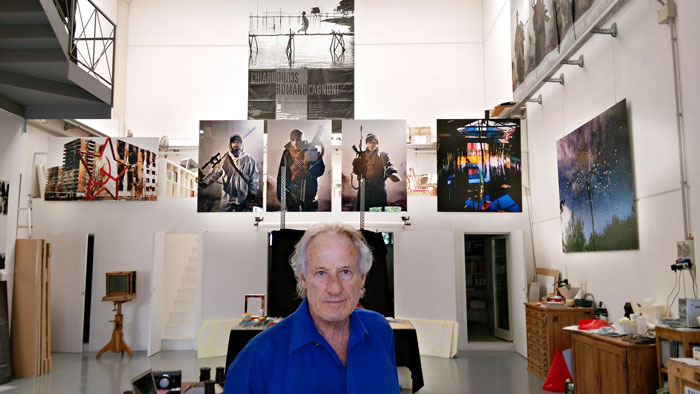
Cagnoni in his studio in Pietrasanta, 2015

Romano Cagnoni (Pietrasanta, Italy, 9 November 1935 – 30 January 2018) was an Italian photographer who spent most of his professional life based in London.

== Biography ==
Cagnoni used to photograph sculptures in the small town of Pietrasanta, Tuscany, which is famous for its sculpture studios. In 1958, he moved to London, UK, where he lived for 30 years. Here, he started working as a freelance photographer contributing to different European magazines. He worked with Simon Guttmann who run the London office of the Report photo agency.

Cagnoni was the first western non-communist photographer to be allowed North of Vietnam with the British journalist James Cameron. He worked in Cambodia, Nigeria during the civil war, Israel, Northern Ireland, Afghanistan, Yugoslavia, Chechnya, Kosovo, with the Soviet Army in Afghanistan in 1980, in Poland (1981), and Argentinian airports during the Falklands War in 1982. He was the first photographer to set up a studio on the front line to photograph soldiers during the fighting in Chechnya in 1995.

In 1968 he won the Overseas Press Club Award, for his Nigerian Civil War reportage published in Life, the German Art Directors' Club bronze medal for documenting with a large format camera the destruction from the war in the former Yugoslavia, and many Italian prizes. In the late 1980s, he returned to live in Pietrasanta in Italy, from where he travels worldwide for his work.

Cagnoni held 43 solo exhibitions, 43 group shows and retrospectives worldwide. His exhibition at Palazzo dell'Arengario in Milan, bore the title "Chiaroscuro", which, beyond the literal meaning, hints to "humour and darkness": these photographs show the darkness of war and sometimes the humour of everyday life. Cagnoni felt that these opposites are the essence of his work.

The Sunday Times former editor Harold Evans, in his book Pictures on a Page: Photo-Journalism, Graphics and Picture Editing, mentions Cagnoni as one of the most famous photographers in the world with Henri Cartier-Bresson, Bill Brandt, Don McCullin and Eugene Smith.

In 1970 Cagnoni married the English artist Berenice Sydney, who died in 1983.

== Publications by Cagnoni ==
- Romano Cagnoni, (catalogue) ed. Olivetti, Milan, 1975.
- Romano Cagnoni, (catalogue) ed. Museo Universitario di Scienza e Arte, Mexico City, 1976.
- Cultura e tecnologia nel Sud, ed. Fiat, Turin, 1978.
- Romano Cagnoni a Bologna, ed. Ente Manifestazioni Artistiche, Bologna, 1979.
- Sud come sudore, ed. Priuli & Verlucca, Ivrea, 1980.
- Geometria del dolore, ed. Comune di Roma, Rome, 1984.
- Pietrasanta & Figli, ed. Electa, Milan 1985 ISBN 88-435-1212-9.
- Italy-Library of Nations, ed. Time-Life, New York / Amsterdam, 1986. ISBN 0-7054-0850-7.
- Caro Marmo, ed. Iveco Fiat, Turin, 1987. ISBN 88-7781-027-0.
- Scultori a Pietrasanta, (catalogue) ed. La Subbia, Pietrasanta, 1991.
- Kan Yasuda scultore, with Kozo Watabiki, ed. Leonardo De Luca, Milan, 1991.
- Il Mondo a Fuoco, ed. Electa, Milan, 2000. ISBN 88-435-7663-1.
- Materia Eterea, sculptures by Kan Yasuda, ed. Comune di Pietrasanta, 2003.
- ChiaroScuro, ed. Electa, Milan, 2004. ISBN 88-370-2332-4.
- Giacomo Puccini-Luoghi e suggestioni, Fazzi Ed, 2008. ISBN 978-88-7246-918-7.
- Romano Cagnoni-Racconti Inediti, 2009.
- La Guerra negli Occhi, Giunti Ed, 2011.
- Upside Down Memories – Seravezza Fotografia Bandecchi e Vivaldi Ed, 2012.

== Collections ==
Cagnoni's work is held in the following public collections:

- Comune di Carrara, Carrara.
- Comune di Bologna, Bologna.
- Palazzo Te Museum, Mantua.
- Contemporary Photography Museum, Parma.

== Awards ==
- 1970: Overseas Press Club Award, USA.
- 1992: German Art Directors' Club Bronze Medal.
- 1998: Premio Atri per la Fotografia per la Pace e la Libertà.
- 2009: Werner Bischof Silver Flute.
