= Jakob van Hoddis =

Jewish German expressionist poet (1887-1942)

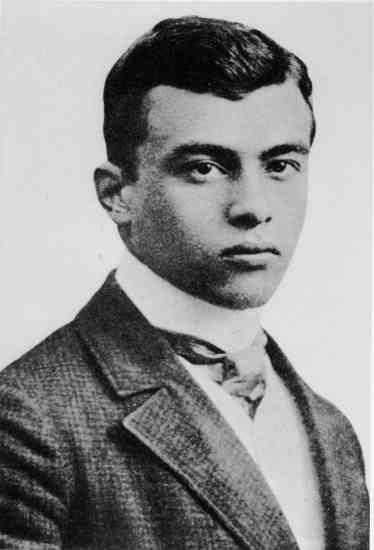
Jakob van Hoddis (1910)

Jakob van Hoddis (16 May 1887 – May/June 1942) was the pen name of the Jewish German expressionist poet Hans Davidsohn, of which "Van Hoddis" is an anagram. His most famous poem Weltende (End of the world), published on 11 January 1911 in the Der Demokrat magazine, is generally regarded as ushering in the Expressionist style of poetry and inspired many other poets to write in a similarly grotesque style; he is also seen as perhaps the only German predecessor of surrealism (which did not exist as a movement in Germany).

== Life ==
Born in Berlin, he was the oldest son of the public health doctor Hermann Davidsohn and his wife Doris, née Kempner. Mrs Davidsohn gave birth to twins, but the other baby was stillborn. He had four other siblings, Marie, Anna, Ludwig, and Ernst. The poet Friederike Kempner (1836–1904) was his great-aunt. He attended the renowned Friedrich Wilhelm Gymnasium; however, due to his temper (although he was extremely intelligent), he was not a successful student. He left school in 1905, to preempt his exclusion, but obtained his Abitur degree as an "external" student in the following year. The young man began studying architecture at the Technische Hochschule in Charlottenburg (now Technische Universität Berlin). In 1907, he joined the University of Jena to study classical philology. Later he returned to Berlin and continued his studies at the Frederick William University; here he met law graduate Kurt Hiller who encouraged him to develop his literary talents.

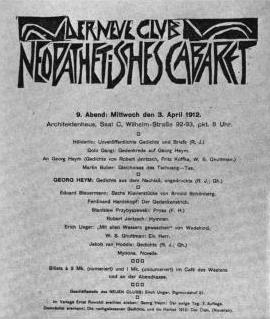
Neopathetisches Cabaret poster, 1912

Davidsohn had already composed poems during his schooldays. In 1909, he and his friend Kurt Hiller created the Expressionist Der Neue Club (The New Club) artists' society in the Hackesche Höfe courtyards; in March of the following year, they introduced their ideas at literary evenings they called Neopathetisches Cabaret (Neo-pathetic Cabaret). They were joined by Georg Heym, Ernst Blass and Erich Unger, soon followed by others, for example Alfred Lichtenstein. Else Lasker-Schüler participated too (she said about van Hoddis' performances "His verses are so ardent that one wants to steal them"). The last, ninth, evening of the Cabaret took place in the spring of 1912; it was a tribute to the tragically deceased Georg Heym. The Cabaret was very popular, often attracting hundreds of spectators. It was during one of these evenings when Weltende was recited, and electrified the audience totally. Many artists later remembered the impact the eight lines had on them that day.

He used the pen name van Hoddis since the death of his father in 1909. During this part of his life, things started to get worse. Not only was he expelled from university for inactivity, but he lost his close friends, Georg Heym and Ernst Balcke, who both drowned in January 1912 ice-skating on the Havel River. He left Berlin for Munich, turned to Catholicism and, after he suffered a nervous breakdown, voluntarily entered a mental hospital. Although he was released and returned to Berlin, he was soon hospitalized again after attacking his mother. His mental health continued to decline, and he lived in private care from 1914 until 1922. In 1915, his younger brother Ludwig was killed in action as a soldier in World War I. From 1922, Van Hoddis lived in Tübingen, where his mother had placed him under the guardianship of his uncle. After 1927, when his mother lost her money, he came under the care of a state clinic (Christophsbad in Göppingen).

In 1933, immediately after Hitler's nomination as Reich Chancellor, Van Hoddis' family escaped to Tel Aviv (where his broken-hearted mother died a few months later). However, it proved impossible for him to secure an entrance certificate to the British Mandate of Anglo-Palestine due to his mental illness. He thus was forced to remain in Nazi Germany where Expressionism had come to be seen as an absolutely unacceptable or "degenerate art" form.

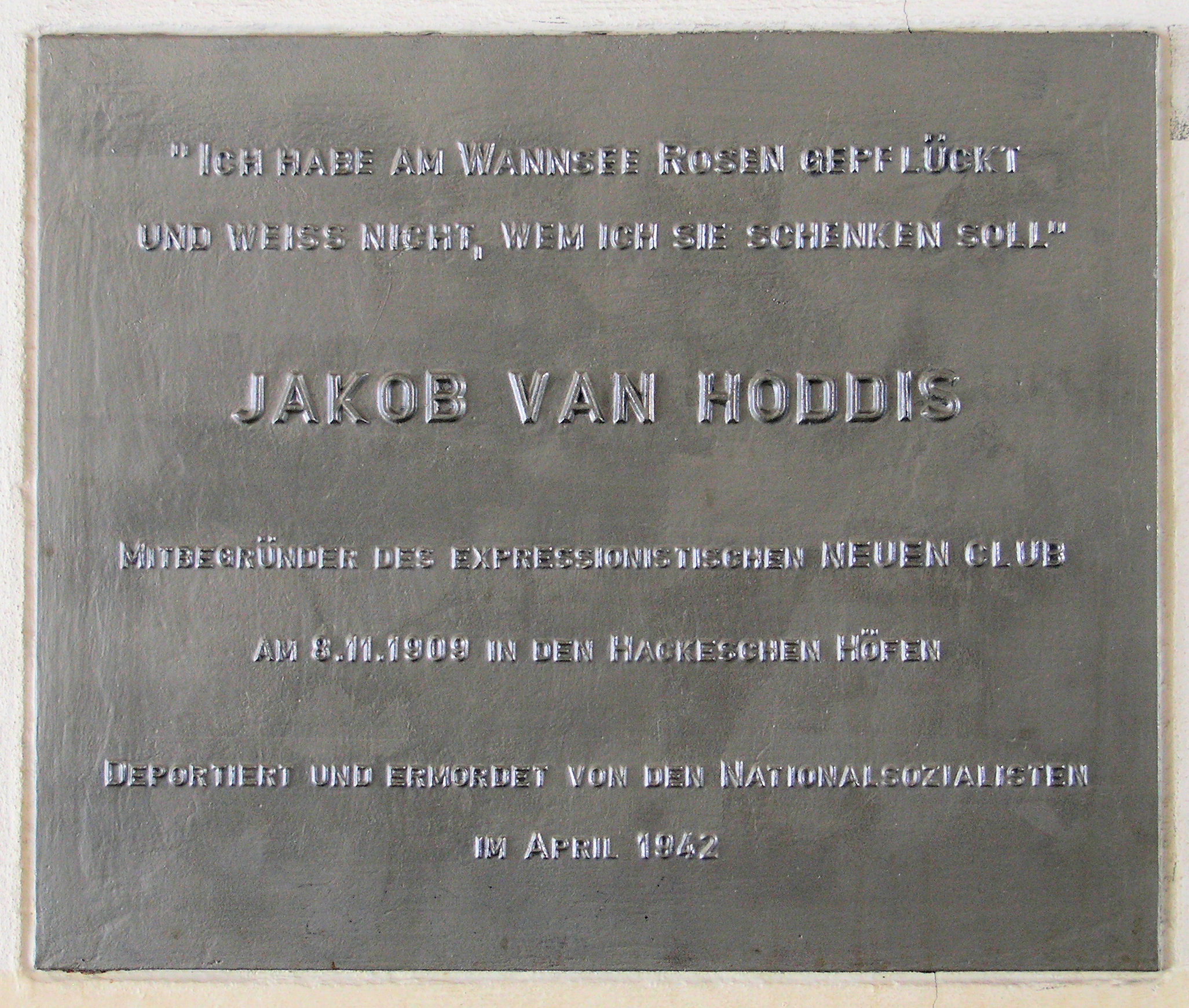
Memorial plaque, Hackesche Höfe, Berlin

Some Expressionist artists managed to flee the country with many more either committing suicide or who were murdered in Nazi concentration camps. Given that Van Hoddis was Jewish, an Expressionist writer, and also mentally ill (which then meant in Germany that he was subject to "mercy killing"), his murder in Nazi Germany was almost guaranteed. On 30 April 1942, he and all the other patients and staff (about 500 people) of his sanatorium near Koblenz were transported to the Sobibór extermination camp via Krasnystaw. None of them survived. The exact date of van Hoddis' death remains unknown.

== Works ==
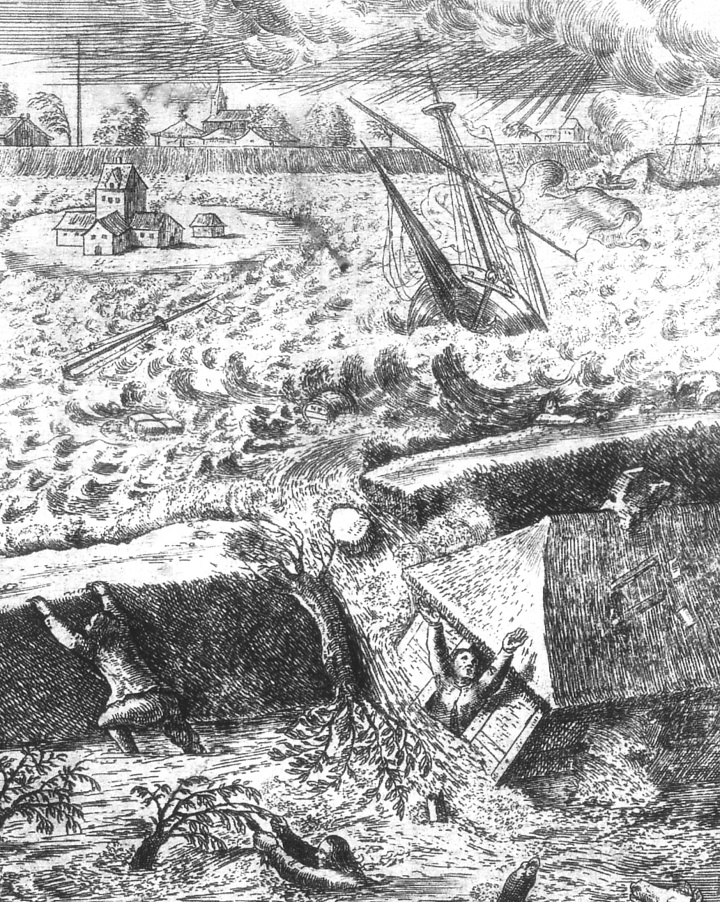
Historical dike burst, copper engraving, 1661

Van Hoddis published numerous poems, characterised by cipher-like Dadaistic elements, in literary magazines such as Die Aktion or Der Sturm. Only one collection, Weltende, was published during his life, by Franz Pfemfert in 1918. André Breton included van Hoddis in his 1940 Anthology of Black Humor. A major rediscovery of his work began after a new edition by Paul Pörtner in 1958. In the English-speaking world he remains almost unknown.

Posthumous collections:

- Paul Pörtner (ed.): Jakob van Hoddis, Weltende. Gesammelte Dichtungen. Arche, Zürich, 1958 - Collected poems
- Regina Nörtemann (ed.): Jakob van Hoddis. Dichtungen und Briefe. Wallstein, Göttingen, 2007, ISBN 978-3-8353-0178-8 - Poetry and Letters

== Weltende ==
Van Hoddis' most well known poem Weltende was first published in 1911 and has been often translated into English. One of the closest versions—considering both the verse form and the spirit of the original, may be the adaption of Natias Neutert.

Weltende

Dem Bürger fliegt vom spitzen Kopf der Hut,
In allen Lüften hallt es wie Geschrei,
Dachdecker stürzen ab und gehn entzwei.
Und an den Küsten – liest man – steigt die Flut.

Der Sturm ist da, die wilden Meere hupfen
An Land, um dicke Dämme zu zerdrücken.
Die meisten Menschen haben einen Schnupfen.
Die Eisenbahnen fallen von den Brücken.

World's End

From burgher's pointy head the hat flies.
In all quarters resounds hullabaloo.
Roof tilers plummet down and break in two.
Along the coasts— one reads — the floodings rise.

The storm is here, wuthering seas are hopping
Ashore to crush dams as if they were midges.
Most people have a cold that is not stopping.
The railway waggons tumble down from bridges.

== Literary influence ==
Weltende is referenced in a poem by Catalan author Gabriel Ferrater called Fi del món ("End of the world"), which paraphrases some of its images.

== References and external links ==
- Jakob Van Hoddis article (in English) by Darran Anderson - Laika Poetry Review, including a translation of Weltende and photos
- Stiftung "Neue Synagoge Berlin - Centrum Judaicum"
- Analysis of "Weltende" (German)
- Works by Jakob van Hoddis at LibriVox (public domain audiobooks)
