= Oskar Goldberg =

German-Jewish philosopher (1885–1953)

Oskar Goldberg (1885 – 1952) was a German-Jewish philosopher and trained physician. Goldberg was brought to fame by his interpretation of the Torah and kabbalistic approach to Jewish philosophy. An idiosyncratic thinker, his wide-ranging interests covered subjects ranging from mysticism, theology, metaphysics, folklore, naturopathy, and spirit photography.

Goldberg initiated several philosophical societies, notably the "Philosophische Gruppe" in Berlin which was frequented by authors and thinkers such as Günther Anders, Berthold Brecht, Walter Benjamin, Karl Korsch, Alfred Döblin, Gershom Scholem and Robert Musil.

== Biography ==
Oskar Goldberg was born in Berlin in 1885 and raised in an Orthodox Jewish household by his mother and paternal grandfather. Goldberg’s father, a gymnasium teacher of the classics, died when Goldberg was three years old. In an unpublished autobiographical account, Goldberg relates an early interest in the Kabbalah at a young age under the abbreviation "G":

“Dr. G., when a boy of five years, was seeking the company of very old people. He happened to come into contact with old men who made kabbalistic experiments. The youngest among them was seventy-six years old and G. was initiated in their circle as youngest [sic] member.“

Two years after graduating in 1906, Goldberg published his book on the numerological hermeneutics of the Torah: Die fünf Bücher Mosis–ein Zahlengebäude in 1908 when he was twenty-three years old. Goldberg’s book received attraction by the renowned historians of religion Robert Eisler and Franz Dornseiff, 'although they disputed his claim that it was beyond the power of human intelligence to fabricate' Goldberg’s uncovered numerological pattern.

In his years attending the Friedrich Wilhelm Gymnasium Goldberg had cultivated a long-standing friendship with the philosopher Erich Unger, who was one year behind Goldberg.

Goldberg had studied medical anthropology at the Ludwig-Maximilians-Universität München, completing his dissertation on yogi practices and rituals (Die abnormalen biologischen Vorgänge bei orientalischen Sekten) in 1915. Goldberg had conducted research for his dissertation in extensive trips to Bhutan, Nepal, and Kashmir.

In 1917, Goldberg met his wife Dora Hiller, a cousin of the gay activist Kurt Hiller, at the Oriental Institute in Berlin where she was working on the translation of the writings of Swami Vivekananda. Goldberg married Dora Hiller in 1921.

Described as his magnum opus, Goldberg published Die Wirklichkeit der Hebräer (The Reality of the Hebrews) in 1925 to widespread interest.

Goldberg attended meetings of the "Philosophische Gruppe" in 1927 which were held in Unger’s Berlin apartment. Attendees of the circle included H. G. Adler, Carl Schmitt, and Alfred Döblin.

Leaving Germany in 1932 for San Remo, Italy for reasons of health until 1938, Goldberg remained outside Germany during the Nazi seizure of power. Goldberg had hence on travelled extensively in order to be shielded from Nazi persecution; to Zurich and Montpellier in early September 1939. After the outbreak of World War Two, Goldberg reported to camps assigned for German nationals and those initiated by the Vichy government after the Fall of France.

Goldberg had come into possession of a US Visa through the American Rescue Committee in March 1941. While in the United States, Goldberg became involved in spiritualist research and submitted contributions to the New York Spiritualist Leader requesting information on ghost sightings. Goldberg was featured in the "Talk of the Town" section of the New Yorker as a result of his interest in ghost photography.

Goldberg returned to France after the death of his wife in 1948. In 1949, he represented American naturopathic physicians at the World Health Organization in Geneva.

Goldberg died in Nice in 1952. He is buried in the Jewish section of a cemetery in Monaco.

== Thought ==
=== The Reality of the Hebrews ===
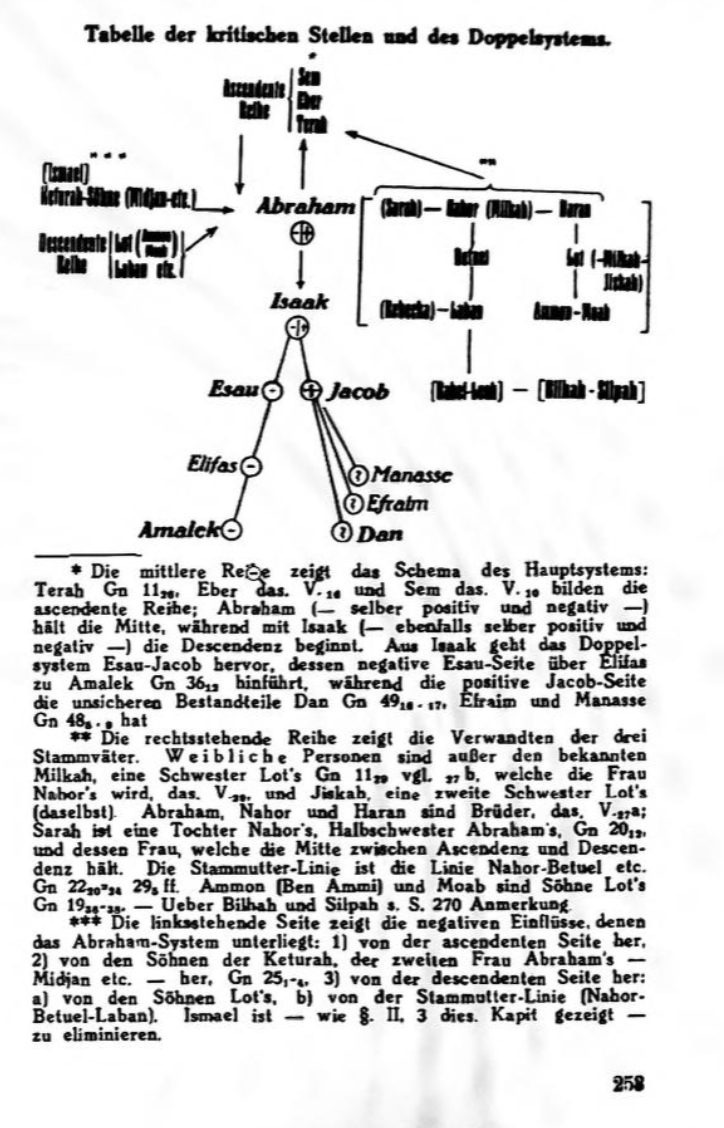
A pseudo-kabbalistic diagram in Goldberg‘s book Die Wirklichkeit der Herbräer

In the opening pages of The Reality of the Hebrews Goldberg elucidates the “philosophical and cosmological foundations” of his interpretation of the Pentateuch. Goldberg states that reality (Wirklichkeit) is divided dually: between an infinite realm of possibilities and the finite realm of existence. Goldberg views the "infinite realm" as having an equal presence in the world as the "finite realm". Goldberg labels the former as "latent reality" and the latter "manifest reality".

The difference between "revealed, finite reality" and the "unrevealed, infinite part of reality" is read by Goldberg as reflecting the metaphysics of the Torah. Whereby through the rites of the Torah, a bridge had been created that allowed for the finite world to gain access to the infinite which found its terminus in God himself.

Goldberg describes the genesis of the finite world as taking place on days three through five of the creation. The creation of a finite, empirical realm is understood by Goldberg to result in God having to “draw himself into [hineinbegeben] the finite part of the world”. Thus resulting in the finite world as no longer being encompassed in the infinity of God:

“When God enters the world—hinted at in the Bible in the words “I shall be seen in the cloud over the cover of the Holy Ark”—He cannot enter it in His whole perfection. Why not? Because He would thereby destroy the world, owing to its imperfection.… But now the question arises: Why has God, who is alleged to be omnipotent, not created a perfect world from the very beginning? The answer is: Because the truly perfect is unique. There are no two perfect essences, God and World. Such a fact would contradict the very idea of God. God does not create His uniqueness a second time.

Goldberg labels the infinite God as YHWH Echad, and the God brought into the finite, empirical realm as YHWH Elohim. Goldberg relates that as YHWH Elohim created the world, he was compelled to work alongside other "transcendental organisms". Goldberg interprets the creation of fish, birds, and animals as being done before the creation of humans as narrated in Genesis to reflect failures on part of the transcendental organisms to create a "biological centre" or an equivalent to a human being. Only after these failed attempts does YHWH Elohim compel the transcendental organisms to cooperate in creating Adam.

The Fall of Man is interpreted in The Reality of the Hebrews as the transcendental organisms enticing Adam to become "like the Gods" and the point in which humanity becomes dominated by a "biological regime" of sexual reproduction rather than being under the eternal "regeneration source" of YHWH. Taking the fruit of division, Adam is divided into two gendered beings and enters the realm of biology.

Following upon the above, Goldberg views history to revolve around YHWH Elohim struggling to achieve supremacy over the transcendental organisms represented by biocentric gods, with YHWH ultimately seeking to achieve his eschatological goal of defeating the other gods and asserting the unity of humanity under YHWH Elohim. Goldberg relates that the primeval Hebrew folk group through rituals in the tabernacle reproduced Gods presence in the world and that this "metaphysical bridge" had been lost by the construction of the First Temple under King Solomon. Whose ultimate consequences lead to the Babylonian captivity, whereby YHWH is left without an allied folk group and the technological state was created in its place, which Goldberg describes as “administrator of an unmetaphysical normality”

== Reception and criticism ==
Goldberg has been described as having influenced literary circles during the Weimar period to a large extent but has since been "forgotten". Walter Benjamin, while well aware of Goldberg’s work, had distanced himself from his circle. Nonetheless, Goldberg held an indirect influence upon Benjamin through the work of Erich Unger who was deeply influenced by Goldberg’s ideas. With Unger’s book Politik und Metaphysik being described by Benjamin as “the most meaningful work on politics of our time.”

Gershom Scholem was a severe critic of Goldberg. In wake of the impact of Goldberg’s Die Wirklichkeit der Herbräer, Scholem published On the Theology of Sabbatianism in Light of Abraham Cardoso in 1928 wherein Scholem linked Goldberg’s thought to the heretical seventeenth century Sabbatianism movement. Moreover, Scholem described Goldberg in scathing terms, describing him as a "Hochstapler" (confidence trickster) and having said in 1921 when he was invited by Dora Hiller to meet Goldberg at her home, “I am inclined to regard him as a representative of the devil in our generation”.

In Doctor Faustus the novelist Thomas Mann caricatures Goldberg as a "Jewish fascist" in the character of Dr. Chaim Breisacher who preaches an attack on "progressive" civilisation and contrasts it to a primitive early Hebrew culture.

The labeling of Goldberg as a fascist as propagated by Mann has been rejected by modern scholarship. The scholar Bruce Rosenstock presents Goldberg as belonging into a greater tradition of Vitalism and had argued that Goldberg did not believe that ethnicity has a hold in defining the People of God by pointing to sections in Goldberg’s work whereby he related that groups such as Mongolians may become "anthropologically full Jews in the sense of Urjudaism"
