= Georg Heym =

German writer

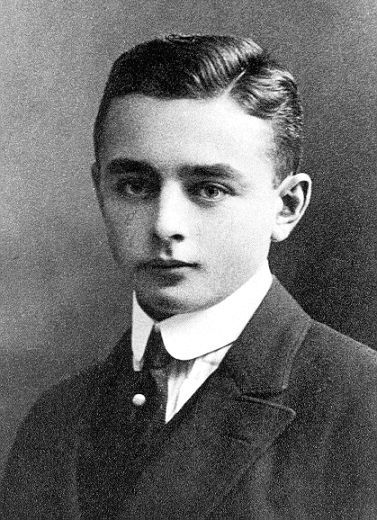
- Georg Heym
- Born: Georg Theodor Franz Artur Heym; 30 October 1887; Hirschberg, Lower Silesia, Province of Silesia, Kingdom of Prussia, German Empire
- Died: 16 January 1912 (aged 24); Gatow, German Empire
- Citizenship: Prussian
- Education: University of Würzburg
- Occupation: Writer
- Writing career
- Language: German
- Period: 1907–1914
- Genres: Poetry; Short story Drama
- Notable work: Der ewige Tag
- Movement: Expressionism

Georg Theodor Franz Artur Heym (30 October 1887 – 16 January 1912) was a German writer. He is particularly known for his poetry, representative of early Expressionism.

== Biography ==
Heym was born in Hirschberg, Lower Silesia, in 1887 to Hermann and Jenny Heym. Throughout his short life, he was in conflict with social conventions. His parents, members of the Wilhelmine middle class, had trouble comprehending their son's rebellious behavior. Heym's own attitude towards his parents was paradoxical; on the one hand he held a deep affection for them, but on the other he strongly resisted any attempts to suppress his individuality and autonomy.

In 1900, the Heyms moved to Berlin, and there Georg began unsuccessfully attending a series of different schools. Eventually, he arrived at the Friedrich-Wilhelms-Gymnasium at Neuruppin in Brandenburg. He was very dissatisfied, and as a way to achieve some release he began writing poetry. After he graduated and went to study law at Würzburg, he started writing plays as well. However, publishers largely ignored his work.

In 1910, Heym met the poet and writer Simon Guttmann, who invited Heym to join the recently founded Der Neue Club, a descendant of a student society at the University of Berlin. Other members of this Club included Kurt Hiller, Jakob van Hoddis, and Erwin Loewenson (also known as Golo Gangi); often visiting were Else Lasker-Schüler, Gottfried Benn, and Karl Kraus. Although the Club had no actual stated objective, its members all shared a sense of rebellion against contemporary culture and possessed a desire for political and aesthetic upheaval. The Club held "Neopathetisches Cabaret" meetings in which members presented work, and it was here that Heym first gained notice. His poetry immediately attracted praise. In January 1911, Ernst Rowohlt published Heym's first book and the only one to appear in his lifetime: Der ewige Tag (The Eternal Day).

Heym later went through several judicial jobs, none of which he held for long due to his lack of respect for authority. On 16 January 1912, Heym and his friend Ernst Balcke went on a skating trip to the frozen river Havel. They never returned. A few days later their bodies were found. Appearances indicated that Balcke had fallen through the ice and Heym had attempted to save him but fell in as well. Heym remained alive for half an hour, calling out for help. His cries were heard by some nearby forestry workers, but they were unable to reach him.

== Works ==
=== Poetry ===
- Der Baum
- Der Gott der Stadt (1910)
- Der Krieg (1911)
- Der ewige Tag (1911)
- Umbra vitae (1912)
- Marathon (1914)
- Die Stadt (1911)

=== Prose ===
- Der Dieb. Ein Novellenbuch (1913)

=== Drama ===
- Der Athener Ausfahrt (1907)

=== Other ===
- Versuch einer neuen Religion (1909)

== Bibliography ==
- Heym, Georg (1994). The Thief and Other Stories. Translated by Susan Bennett (1st ed.). London: Libris. ISBN 1-870352-48-3.
- Heym, Georg (2004). Poems. Translated, with an introduction and notes by Antony Hasler (1st ed.). London: Libris. ISBN 1-870352-97-1. Bilingual edition. Review by Will Stone (2004). Review by Michael Hoffman (21 May 2005). (Re-edition: Evanston, Illinois: Northwestern University Press, 2006. ISBN 0-8101-2322-3.)
