= Richard Bohn =

German architect

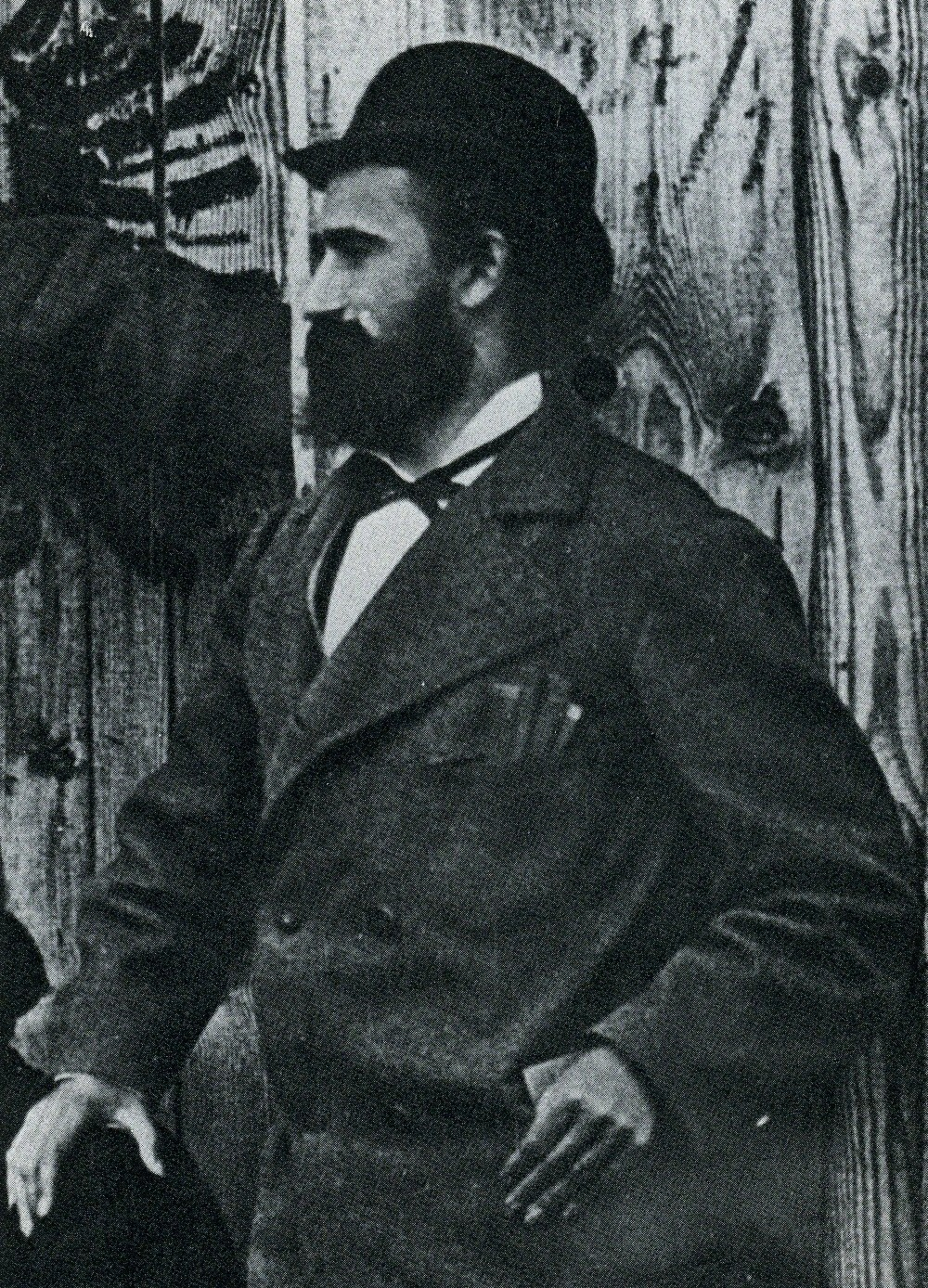
Richard Bohn.

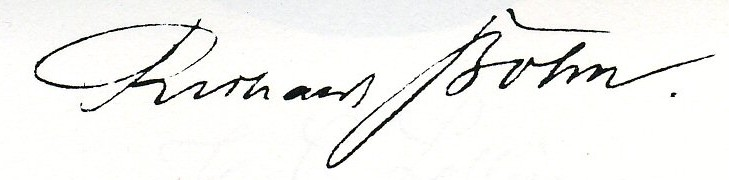
Richard Bohn signature.

Karl Theodor Richard Bohn (29 December 1849 – 22 August 1898 in Görlitz) was a German archaeological architect born in Berlin.

Beginning in 1868, he studied architecture in Berlin, and in 1877 participated in the archaeological dig at Olympia with Friedrich Adler. In 1879 he surveyed the Propylaea in Athens, and later the same year, began work at the Pergamon excavation site. Among his duties at Pergamon, was ascertainment of the original architectural form and measurements of the Pergamon altar.

In 1887 he was named managing director of the Baugewerkschule in Nienburg, and from 1895 onward, worked in the same capacity in Görlitz.

== Published works ==
- Der Tempel der Athena Polias zu Pergamon (Abhandlungen der Königlichen Akademie der Wissenschaften in Berlin 1881:4) (Berlin 1882) – The temple of Athena Polias at Pergamon. (doi:10.11588/diglit.1011)
- Die Propylaeen der Akropolis zu Athen (Berlin 1882) – The Propylaea of the Acropolis at Athens. (doi:10.11588/diglit.675)
- Der Tempel des Dionysos zu Pergamon (Berlin 1885) – The temple of Dionysus at Pergamon.
- Das Heiligtum der Athena Polias Nikephoros (Altertümer von Pergamon II) (Berlin 1886), with Hans Droysen - The sanctuary of Athena Polias at Pergamon. (doi:10.11588/diglit.913)
- Altertümer von Aegae (Jahrbuch des Deutschen Archäologischen Instituts, Ergänzungsheft 2) (Berlin 1889), with Carl Schuchhardt - Antiquities of Aegae. (doi:10.11588/diglit.676)
- Die Theater-Terrasse (Altertümer von Pergamon IV) (Berlin 1896) - The theatre terrace at Pergamon. (doi:10.11588/diglit.919)
