= Opatów, Greater Poland Voivodeship =

Opatów
- Village
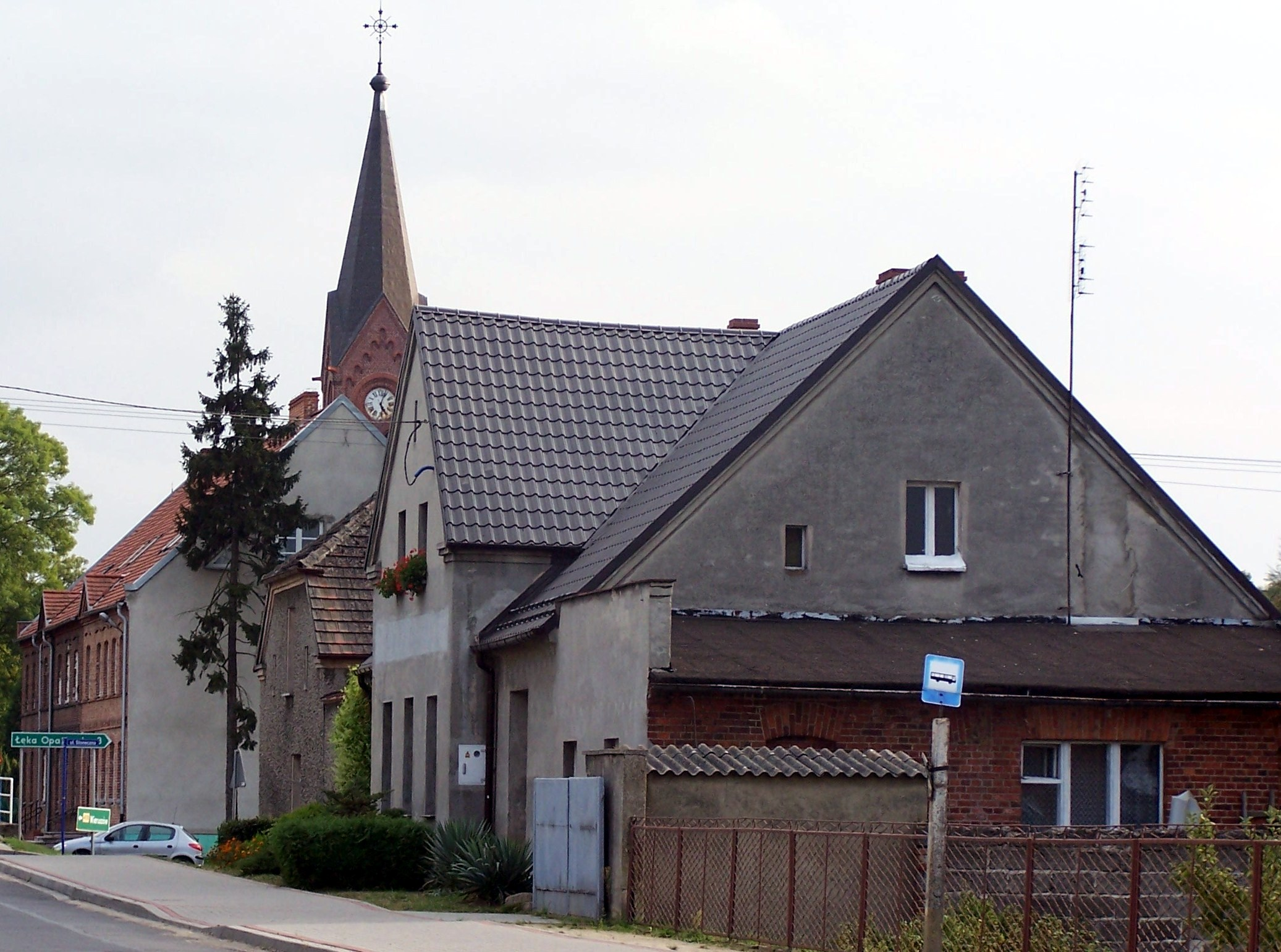

- Location within Poland
- Coordinates: 51°12′50″N 18°08′45″E
- Country: Poland
- Voivodeship: Greater Poland
- County: Kępno
- Gmina: Łęka Opatowska
- Population: 1,200

Opatów [ɔˈpatuf] is a village in the administrative district of Gmina Łęka Opatowska, within Kępno County, Greater Poland Voivodeship, in west-central Poland.

== Notable residents ==
- Friederike Kempner (1836-1904), German-Jewish poet
