= Erich Unger =

Jewish philosopher (1887–1950)

Erich Unger, London 1940s

Erich Unger (1887-1950) was a Jewish philosopher of standing who published many articles and a number of books, many of them in his native tongue, German. His writings cover a wide range of topics: poetry, Nietzsche, political theory, general philosophy and Jewish philosophy.

== Biography ==
Born in Berlin in 1887, Dr Erich Unger was interested, from an early age, in novel ideas and intellectual debate. He attended school in Berlin-Lichterfelde, a wealthy residential area that was heavily influenced by Prussian nobility and members of the Prussian armed forces. At school at "Friedrich-Gymnasium" he met Oskar Goldberg who ran a literary club at the age of seventeen. As a young man Unger became one of the founder members of the literary Expressionist movement in Germany. (cf. Richard Sheppard, Die Schriften des Neuen Klubs, 1908–14, Hildesheim, 1980, 83). Unger's contributions to journals of the day were frequently sought after. (cf. Manfred Voigts, Vom Expressionismus zum Mythos des Hebraertums, Wurzburg: Koenigshausen und Neumann, 1994).

The first World War saw Unger in Switzerland, where he made new friends, among them Walter Benjamin who admired his work and also sought his literary collaboration (cf. G.Scholem, Walter Benjamin. Briefe. Frankfurt-am-Main, 1966). In the 1920s, Unger provided an intellectual forum for a group of young and distinguished scholars who regularly discussed their ideas on science, politics and philosophy. The group rapidly became a centre for the Berlin intelligentsia of the day. (cf. Manfred Voigts, Oskar Goldberg, Berlin 1992).

The advent of Hitler ended a promising academic career and Unger took his young family into exile in 1933, first to Paris and later (1936) to London, where he lived to the end of his life in 1950.

== Major ideas ==
The imagination of reason or systematic imagination in philosophy. This, in Unger's thinking, is a basic tool in any philosophical enquiry into the world of being – into reality beyond experience. Speaking of the latter, Unger writes: "The matter of the world as a whole is not an empirical object, although it is unquestionable real" ('The Living and the Divine' Ch.1). In this essay Unger explains how, in order to apprehend that reality and other, like concepts, such as being or consciousness, we require the imagination of reason. Not unlike astronomers who research heavenly constellations of which they have only a partial direct experience and who then need to complement their experience by using a reasoning imagination to access the aspect that is beyond their direct experience.

Myth. The imagination of reason is also in evidence in Unger's views on the function of myth in religion. His book, 'Wirklichkeit, Mythos, Erkenntnis' ('Reality, Myth and Cognition') is an early work, yet his preoccupation with myth is still seen in a later essay: 'The Natural Order of Miracles', the English version of which appeared in The Journal of Jewish Thought and Philosophy. Here Unger writes: "A genuine myth handles one unit: religion, science, politics, social every day life and extends [and is constrained by] the concepts of order and apprehension of natural experience. This is the source of its rational aspect. As distinct from this, the poetic myth is either pure art or, at least, half religion, half art".

Unger's views on Judaism are wide ranging. He notes with regret the gradual shrinking of Jewish culture to the 'mere religion' that it is today and suggests that, in order to revitalise Judaism, it must once again inspire and underpin our society. This does not mean that there is such a thing as 'Jewish' science or 'Jewish' technology. But Judaism may have views in other areas, in philosophy, sociology or politics, on topics such as Immortality or a specific Jewish ethical stand in political matters (cf. 'A Restatement of Judaism' in the journal Shofar).

== Works ==
Books:

- 1921 Politik und Metaphysik, Berlin. Reprinted and edited by Manfred Voigts, 1989, Wurtzburg
- 1922 Die Staatslose Bildung eines Judischen Volkes, Berlin
- 1925 Gegen die Dichtung, Leipzig
- 1926 Das Problem der Mythischen Realitat, Berlin
- 1930 Wirklichkeit Mythos Erkenntnis, Munich

Posthumously:

- 1952 The Imagination of Reason, Routledge & Kegan Paul, London
- 1966 Das Lebendige und das Gottliche, Jerusalem
- 1992 Vom Expressionismus zum Mythos des Hebräertums: Schriften 1909 bis 1931, Edited by Manfred Voigts, Konigshausen & Neumann, Wurzburg

Essays translated into English:

- 1947 Existentialism, The Nineteenth Century and After
- 1948 Logical Positivism, The Nineteenth Century and After
- 1949 Contemporary Anti-Platonism, The Cambridge Journal

Posthumously:

- 1957 Modern Judaism's Need for Philosophy, Commentary, vol 23, no.5
- 1995 Universalism in Hebraism, Journal of Jewish Thought and Philosophy, vol.4
- 2002 The Natural Order of Miracles, Journal of Jewish Thought and Philosophy, vol.11, no.2
- 2003 A Restatement of Judaism, Shofar vol 21, no.2.
- 2007 The Living and the Divine Online
- 2007 The Story of the Garden of Eden Online
- 2007 Conversation on Immortality Online
- 2008 A Jewish History of the Second World War Online
- 2008 Special Universals - a Jewish Perspective? Online
- 2009 'Introductory Thoughts on Hermann Cohen' Online
- 2009 'Martin Buber' Online
- 2010 'Do Philosophers Disagree' Online
