= Marie Wackwitz =

German politician (1865–1930)

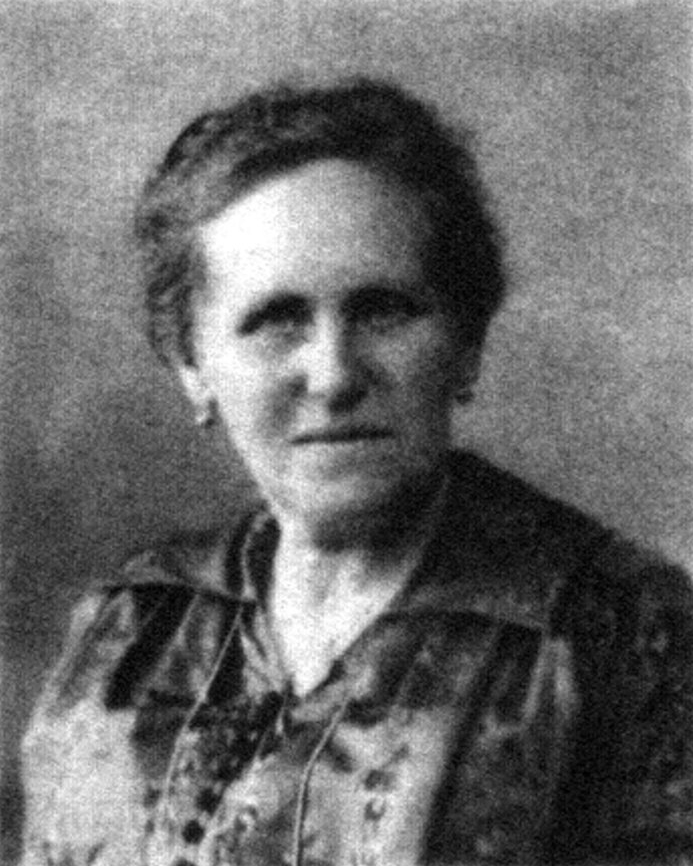
Wackwitz's official Reichstag portrait, 1920

Marie Wackwitz (born Johanna Marie Louise Zinske: 11 January 1865 – 23 November 1930) was a German socialist politician, women's rights activist and journalist.

== Biography ==
=== Provenance and early years ===
Marie Louise Zinske was born slightly more than five years before unification, in Löbau, a small industrial town dominated at that time by the textiles industry, located to the south of Cottbus and to the north of the Saxon frontier with Bohemia. Her father was a building worker. Sources describe Zinske as "konfessionslos" or "dissident", suggesting that, slightly unusually for those times, traditional religion did not play a major part in her upbringing. On leaving school she was able to enroll in further education courses, and in 1889 she became involved with the Workers' Education Association for Dresden and Löbtau.

=== SPD ===
At the start of 1890 the Reichstag refused to renew Chancellor Bismarck's Anti-Socialist Laws and what now became the Social Democratic Party was effectively unbanned, rebranded and relaunched. The 1850 Prussian Association Law prohibiting "female persons, school children and pupils" ("Frauenpersonen, Schülern und Lehrlingen") from membership of political organisations had been adopted across Germany following unification and would remain in force till 1908, but outside the old Prussian heartland it was enforced and interpreted with varying levels of conviction. Marie Louise Zinske had married Adolf Clemens Wackwitz in 1889, and in 1890 Marie Wackwitz joined the new Social Democratic Party (" Sozialdemokratische Partei Deutschlands" /SPD). Within the regional party, from 1901, she took responsibility for "organising social-democratic women" in Saxony. She participated as a delegate at various party conferences, notably at Munich (1920), Bremen (1904), Nuremberg (1908) and Jena (1911). She was also active as a journalist-commentator, contributing till 1917 to Die Gleichheit, a bi-monthly socialist political magazine committed to gender equality and edited throughout this period (1891 to 1917) by the formidable Clara Zetkin.

=== USPD ===
The decision by the party leadership in 1914 to support funding for the war caused ructions among the membership from the start, and in 1917 the SPD finally split over the policy. Marie Wackwitz was among the anti-war members who now switched to the so-called Independent Social Democratic Party ("Unabhängige Sozialdemokratische Partei Deutschlands" / USPD). In 1919 she became regional party secretary (effectively local party leader) in the region around Weißenfels. During that year she attended party conferences in Leipzig and Berlin. She was a member of the USPD national "Women's Committee". She also worked as a contributing editor to the party magazine, "Die Kämpferin" ("The [female] Fighter").

=== Reichstag ===
In June 1920 Marie Wackwitz was elected to the Reichstag (national parliament) as a USPD member representing Merseburg (Election District 12 / "Wahlkreis 12"). The USPD had already itself split, with most members becoming founding members of the Communist Party. Towards the end of 1920 the residuum of the USPD fragmented further, with some members returning to the SPD and others, mostly from the left of the party, joining the Communist Party (which for a couple of years following this development was formally known as the "United Communist Party"). Wackwitz was now sitting in the Reichstag as a party comrade of Clara Zetkin and Paul Levi.

A propensity to fragmentation continued to be a feature of the Communist Party and other parties of the radical left in Germany throughout the 1920s. Following the March uprising in 1921 there were concerns that the party was being taken over by extremists who favoured moving on rapidly to a full-scale German revolution following the violent Russian Bolskevik model. In September 1921 Paul Levi, who at the start of the year had been the leader of the party, was excluded from it (and / or resigned from it), along with Ernst Däumig. Marie Wackwitz was among those who resigned from the party at the same time. According to at least one source she now sat as an independent Reichstag member while elsewhere it is stated that she now briefly became a member of Paul Levi's short-lived "Kommunistische Arbeitsgemeinschaft (KAG / loosely "Communist Working Group").

During the early part of 1922 the KAG merged with what was left of the USPD, meaning that in April 1922 Wackwitz rejoined the USPD. However, the war funding issue which back in 1917 had led to the original split between the SPD and the USPD no longer featured significantly on the political agenda of either party. Following the assassination by right-wing extremists of Foreign Minister Walther Rathenau in June 1922, the SPD and the USPD were increasingly working together in the Reichstag. In September 1922 they formally merged, meaning that Marie Wackwitz was now back in the party from which she had broken five years earlier. She continued to sit as a member of the Reichstag till 1924.

=== Final years ===
There were two general elections in 1924. Marie Wackwitz stood unsuccessfully as an SPD candidate in both of them. She stood for election again in 1928 but was no more successful than before. Meanwhile she continued to live in Weißenfels, supporting herself as a journalist-commentator.

Marie Wackwitz died at Dresden on 23 November 1930.
