= Anna Geyer =

German politician and journalist (1893–1973)

- Born: Anna Elbert; 13 March 1893; Frankfurt am Main, Province of Hesse-Nassau, German Empire
- Died: 2 March 1973 (aged 79); Detroit, United States
- Occupations: Political activist Journalist; Dietician
- Political party: USPD; KPD; SPD
- Spouse: Curt Geyer (1891-1967)
- Children: Lily Geyer / Skelsey 1927
- Parent(s): Hans Elbert (1864-1928); Amalie Kress (1871-1956)

Anna Geyer (born Anna Elbert: 13 March 1893 – 2 March 1973) was a German politician (USPD, KPD, SPD) and journalist.

== Life ==
Anna Elbert was born in Frankfurt. Her father, Hans Elbert (1864–1928), was a sculptor. After leaving school she is described in sources variously as a secretary and as a housewife. In 1917 she married the contributing-editor of the Leipziger Volkszeitung (daily newspaper), Curt Geyer. 1917 was also the year in which she joined the Independent Social Democratic Party ("Unabhängige Sozialdemokratische Partei Deutschlands" / USPD), launched that year as a result of a split within the Social Democratic Party (SPD), primarily over differences with the party leadership over whether to support continued funding for the war. In the USPD she worked in the head office for business councils and created a party press and information service. In 1919 she was elected a member of the Leipzig city council and was appointed a member of the Saxony regional parliament (Landtag).

At the end of 1920, as the USPD itself broke up, she was part of the left wing majority that moved across to join the newly formed Communist Party, along with her husband and her brother in law, Friedrich Geyer. Here again she ran a press and information service for the party. The young Communist Party also proved prone to internal feuding. In the political context surrounding the March revolt of 1921 she supported Paul Levi and those around him. After Levi was resigned from his leadership position in the party she continued to provide him with copies of internal leadership and Comintern communications, which led to her own exclusion from the party the 7th Party conference in August 1921. Her husband, also active as a supporter of Levi's approach, was excluded from the party at the same time.

The excluded Levi faction now formed the Communist Working Group ("Kommunistische Arbeitsgemeinschaft"), led by Levi himself and by Ernst Däumig. Both the Geyers were initially members. However, in February 1922 Curt Geyer moved over to the (briefly resurgent) USPD, followed by Anna Geyer the next month. In September 1922 what remained of the USPD re-merged with the SPD, taking Anna and Vurt Geyer with it. Within the party she continued to be active, especially in respect of women's political and employment issues, a subject on which she published a book in 1924.

The political backdrop changed completely with the Nazi power seizure in January 1933. The new government lost little time in transforming Germany into a one-party dictatorship. People who were, or had been, members of the Communist Party were subject to harassment and arrest. In October 1933 the Geyers emigrated to Prague in Czechoslovakia where, like her husband, she worked on the (now exiled) Social Democratic publication, Neue Vorwärts. On 25 July 1936 she was stripped of her German citizenship. Although Czechoslovakia was not invaded till 1938, the government by that point faced increasing pressure from the German government to close down Neue Vorwärts, as a result of which the publication moved its base again in 1937, this time to Paris. The Geyers went too.

In May/June 1940 the German army invaded France, placing the north of the country under German occupation while entrusting the southern part of the country to a puppet government. Anna Geyer escaped through the south of France to Portugal, leaving Curt in Paris. They later divorced. (Curt Geyer escaped to Britain the next year.) In November 1940 Anna Geyer was able to embark on a ship from Lisbon to the USA. where she would spend the rest of her life, working initially as a dietitian. Her mother, born Amalie Kress (1871–1956), had already emigrated to the United States as a widow in 1931.

In 1941 Anna Geyer became a member of the executive committee of the "German-American Council for the Liberation of Germany from Nazism", founded by her fellow SPD political exile, Albert Grzesinski.

She died in Detroit on 2 March 1973.
