= Henriette Ackermann =

German politician (1887–1977)

Henriette Ackermann (8 September 1887 – 31 August 1977) was an outspoken left-wing German political activist and politician (KPD, USPD).

She survived at least two periods in the Ravensbrück concentration camp during the Nazi years.

== Early life ==
Ackermann was born in Ehrenfeld, since 1888 a quarter of Cologne. She was one of her parents' two daughters. The family ran a barbers' shop. Ackermann left school at 16 and took a job as a book keeper.

== Biography ==
Two years later, aged 18, she joined the Social Democratic Party (SPD) in 1905. She stood uncompromisingly for better wages and for better living conditions for the unemployed, for welfare recipients and for the war wounded.

With the outbreak of war in July 1914, the SPD national leadership agreed to what was in effect a political truce, voting in the Reichstag to support war credits. The policy was contentious within the party from the outset, and Ackermann spoke out against it. Towards the end of 1916 she was a co-founder of the Cologne section of the Spartacus League, a breakaway anti-war grouping of hitherto SPD members. In October 1916 Adolf Hofrichter, the SPD Reichstag member for Cologne died. Ackermann backed Karl Liebknecht's candidacy to succeed him: she was expelled from the party.

In April 1917, Henriette Ackermann was a delegate to the conference at Gotha at which the Independent Social Democratic Party ("Unabhängige Sozialdemokratische Partei Deutschlands" / USPD) was founded. At the end of that year she was arrested and detained in Berlin, based on accusations involving "anti-militarist propaganda".

By the end of 1918 she was at liberty, and is identified as "one of the first Communists in the Rhineland". She participated, as a delegate from Cologne-Ehrenfeld, in the Communist Party's three day founding congress that opened in Berlin on 30 December 1918, although even after this she continued her work as an official of the USPD.

On 5 October 1919, following changes in the rules governing women's voting rights which made it possible, she was one of the first women elected to the Cologne city council. The nature of the splits that affected the parties of the left at this time - at least in Cologne - evidently did not preclude combining active membership of both the USPD and of the United Communist Party ("Vereinigte Kommunistische Partei Deutschlands"/VKPD) as the mainstream Communist party in Germany was, for some purposes, known over a couple of years from the end of 1920. From that time she worked as a member of the VKPD leadership team for the "Middle Rhine" district, together with Franz Dahlem and Philipp Fries. At the same time, in the city council she headed up the VKPD group in the chamber.

After the expulsion from the party of Ernst Reuter (whom sources from the time sometimes identify by his "party name" as Ernst Friesland), Ackermann quit the Communist party, joining instead the breakaway Kommunistische Arbeitsgemeinschaft (KAG) and then resuming her membership of the USPD.

The USPD was by this stage much diminished, however, and in September 1922 most of what remained of it reunited with the SPD, from which it had broken away five years earlier. Ackermann was one of those who rejected this reunification, and she remained a member of the (now further diminished) USPD, now under the leadership of Georg Ledebour and Theodor Liebknecht.

Following the various party splits that were a feature of leftwing politics during the Weimar years, Ackermann was for many years the sole USPD member of the Cologne city council. Till 1932 she was also employed by the Cologne office of the Freethinkers League ("Deutscher Freidenkerbund"). Régime change at the beginning of 1933 ushered in twelve years of one-party dictatorship, and with political activity (except in respect of the Nazi party) now banned, in March 1933 Henriette Ackermann found herself taken into "protective custody".

This was a routine experience for those who had been politically active during the 1920s, especially where the activities had involved Communism, and those detained were generally released after a year or so and placed under police surveillance.

Although she was at liberty after some months, she later wrote that as a former communist she found herself stigmatised, one practical result of which was that it became particularly hard for her to find work in Hitler's Germany. It is recorded that Ackermann underwent two further periods of detention, both spent in the Ravensbrück concentration camp, during 1939/40 and again during 1944/45.

War ended, formally, in May 1945, and with it the Nazi régime. Initially Ackermann worked as a book keeper in Berlin. Later she worked for a time in a clerical position for the Cologne city council. She was no longer politically active, however.

== Death and legacy ==
Ackermann died on 31 August 1977, a week short of her 90th birthday, in a senior-living home at Brühl near Cologne. In March 1993, a new street in Cologne was named after her.
