= Curt Geyer =

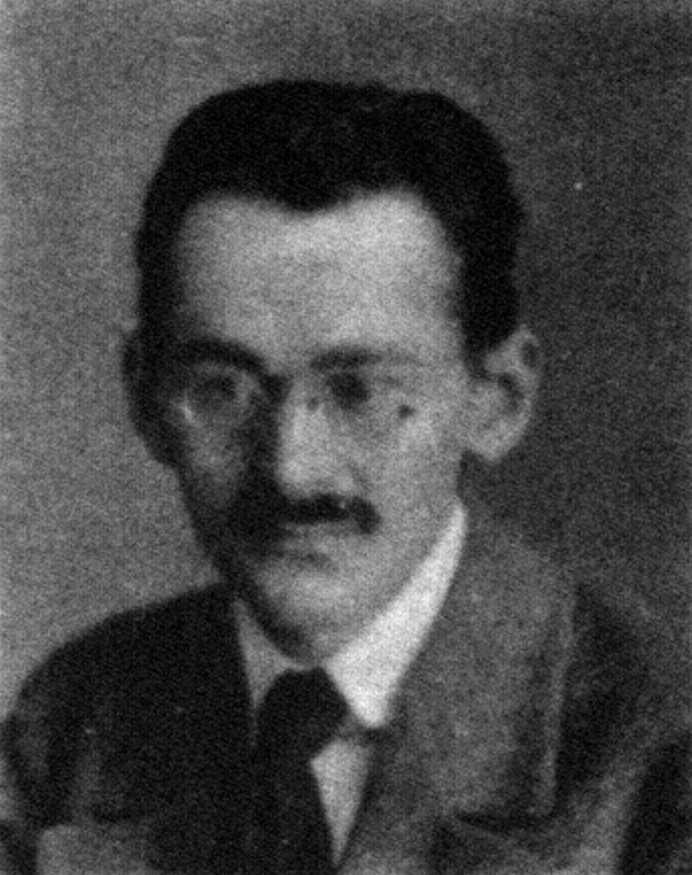
- Geyer c. 1919
- Born: November 19, 1891; Leipzig, German Empire
- Died: June 24, 1967 (aged 75); Lugano, Switzerland
- Education: University of Frankfurt
- Political party: SPD (1911–1917, after 1922); USPD (1917–1920, 1922); KPD (1920–1921); KAG (1921–1922)
- Spouse: Anna Geyer

Curt Theodore Geyer (19 November 1891 – 24 June 1967) was a German socialist politician, historian and journalist.

Born in Leipzig, Geyer was the son of Friedrich Geyer, a prominent social democrat. Geyer followed his father in joining the Social Democratic Party of Germany (SPD), and studied history at university, receiving a doctorate in 1914. He became a newspaper editor on various local SPD publications, but he opposed World War I and so joined the Independent Social Democratic Party of Germany (USPD), losing his job. He found work with the Leipziger Volkszeitung, and was the USPD's leading figure in the city during the German Revolution of 1918-1919. He was active in the Workers' and Soldiers' Congress, and won election to the Weimar National Assembly, and then the Reichstag.

Although Geyer lost influence in Leipzig to the right wing of the USPD, he remained a national figure, and an early advocate of the Communist Party of Germany (KPD). He became editor of the Hamburger Volkszeitung, and then co-editor of the Kommunistische Rundschau. He was also elected to the central committee of the KPD.

In 1921, Geyer resigned from the KPD, in sympathy with Paul Levi, joining the Communist Working Group, then the USPD and the SPD. He lost his seat in the Reichstag in 1924, and became an editor on Vorwärts. When the Nazis came to power, in 1933, he fled to Prague, and then onto Paris, where he became editor of the Neuen Vorwärts. He helped German emigrants escape the advancing Nazis before, in 1941, emigrating to the United Kingdom. There, he became sympathetic to the anti-German ideas of Robert Vansittart, joining the Fight for Freedom group, and being excluded from the Union of German Socialist Organisations in Great Britain.

Geyer remained in London after World War II, and wrote for various West German newspapers.
