= Adolph Hoffmann =

German politician (1858–1930)

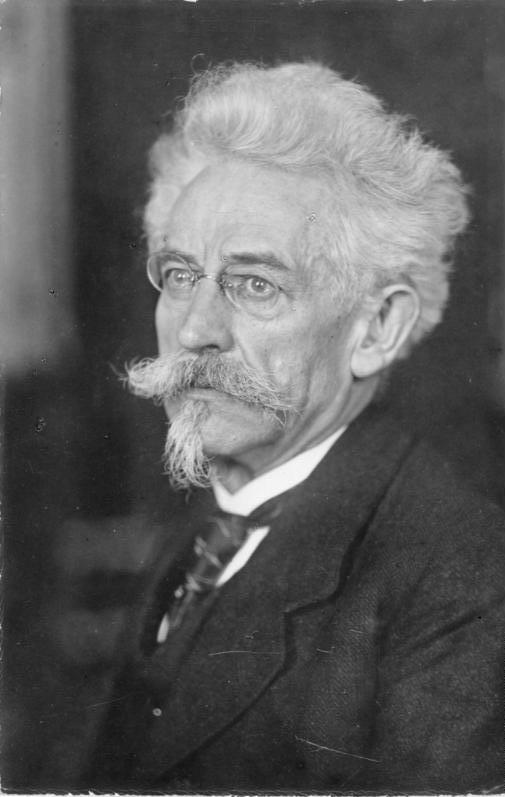
- Hoffmann in 1911

Chairman of the Independent Social Democratic Party of Germany
- In office October 1920 – 4 December 1920
- Serving with: Ernst Däumig
- Preceded by: Arthur Crispien
- Succeeded by: Arthur Crispien

Minister of Culture of the Free State of Prussia
- In office 12 November 1918 – 4 January 1919
- Minister-President: Paul Hirsch
- Serving with: Konrad Haenisch
- Preceded by: Friedrich Schmidt-Ott
- Succeeded by: Konrad Haenisch
Parliamentary constituencies
Member of the Reichstag
In office 24 June 1920 – 27 May 1924
Preceded by	Constituency established
Succeeded by	Multi-member district
Constituency	Berlin
In office 1904 – 25 January 1907
Preceded by	Franz Hofmann
Succeeded by	Robert Merkel
Constituency	Saxony 22
Member of the Landtag of Prussia for Potsdam II
In office 14 June 1928 – 1 December 1930
Preceded by	Multi-member district
In office 10 March 1921 – September 1921
Preceded by	Constituency established
Succeeded by	Wilhelm Pieck
Member of the Prussian State Assembly
In office 13 March 1919 – 10 March 1921
Preceded by	Office established
Succeeded by	Office abolished

Personal details
- Born: 23 March 1858 Berlin, Province of Brandenburg, Kingdom of Prussia
- Died: 1 December 1930 (aged 72) Berlin, Province of Brandenburg, Free State of Prussia, Weimar Republic
- Party: SAP (1876–1890); SPD (1890–1917, after 1922); USPD (1917–1920, 1922); KPD (1920–1921); KAG (1921–1922)
- Occupation: Politician; Publisher; Editor; Gilder; Engraver
- Central institution membership: 1920–1921: Full member, KPD Zentrale; Other offices held: 1908–1918: Member, Prussian House of Representatives; 1900–1928: Member, Berlin City Council

Johann Franz Adolph Hoffmann (23 March 1858 – 1 December 1930) was a German socialist politician and Prussian Minister for Science, Culture and Education.

== Biography ==
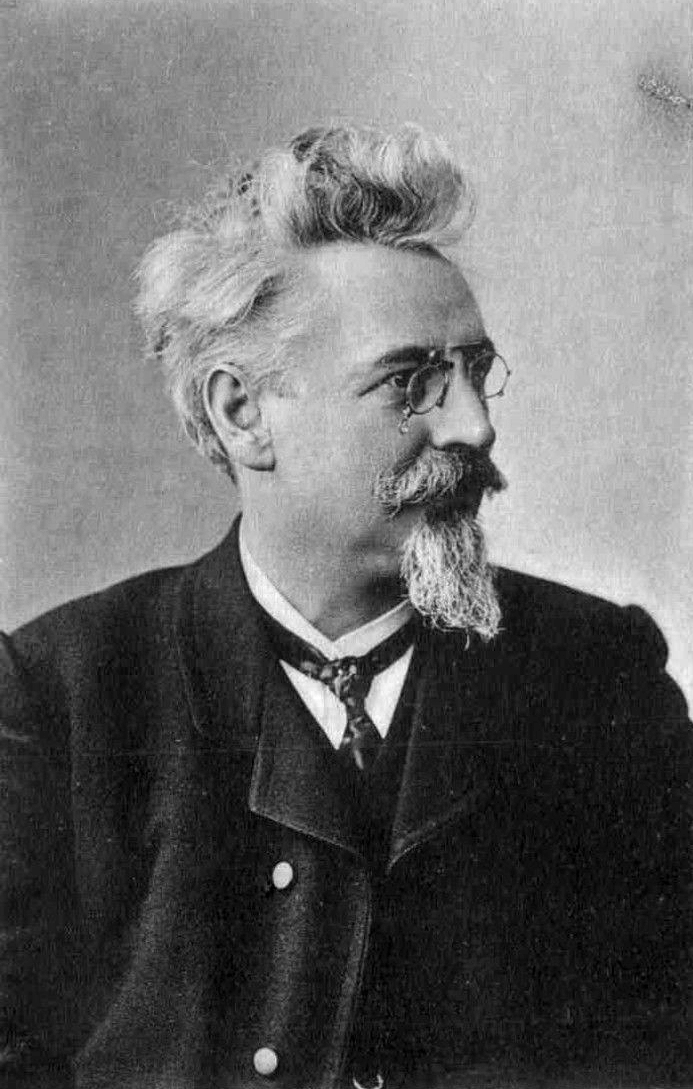
Hoffmann's official Reichstag portrait, 1920

Born in Berlin, Hoffmann worked as an engraver, and then as a gilder. He joined the Social Democratic Party of Germany, and from 1890 was the editor of local socialist newspapers, then in 1893 became a book dealer and publisher. He was known for his opposition to the ways in which Christianity was practiced by the wealthy and his advocacy for a radial separation of church and state, for this he was nicknamed "Ten Commandments Hoffmann" as a result.

In 1900, Hoffmann was elected to Berlin City Council, in 1904 to the Reichstag, and in 1908 to the Prussian House of Representatives. In 1915, Hoffmann represented together with Georg Ledebour the German pacifist socialists at the Zimmerwald conference. In 1916, he was elected as chair of the Berlin SPD, but he opposed World War I and so joined the Independent Social Democratic Party of Germany (USPD) split, becoming its chair until 1918.

During the November Revolution, Hoffmann together with Konrad Haenisch became Prussian Minister of Science, Art and Popular Education for a few months. During this time he tried to abolish school inspection in Prussia by the Churches and agitated for the separation of Church, school and state. His strongly anticlerical remarks he made in office helped mobilize the Catholic electorate, who feared a new Kulturkampf. After the events of the Spartacus Uprising, Hoffmann left his post as education minister.

Hoffmann was re-elected to the Reichstag in 1920 and the Landtag of Prussia in 1921. In October 1920, he became co-chair of the left-wing faction of the USPD, which he led into the Communist Party of Germany (KPD). He was elected to the KPD Zentrale in December 1920, but resigned just two months later in sympathy with Paul Levi. He followed Levi into the Communist Working Group, the USPD, and then the SPD. Hoffman continued his work with the KPD-backed Workers International Relief. In 1926 he spoke out in favor of the expropriation of the princes. He lost his seat in the Reichstag in 1924, and stood down from the city council in 1928.

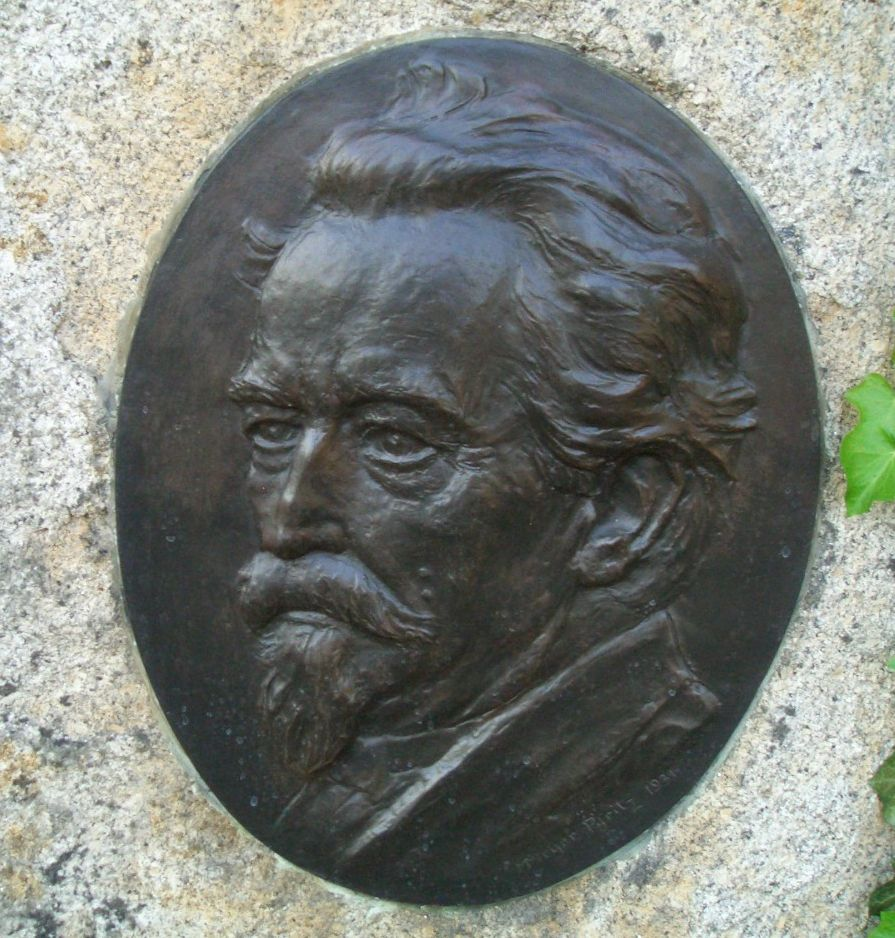
Relief on Hoffmann's gravestone, Friedrichsfelde Central Cemetery

Hoffmann was again elected to the Landtag in 1928, serving until his death in Berlin in 1930.
