= Emil Eichhorn =

German politician (1863–1925)

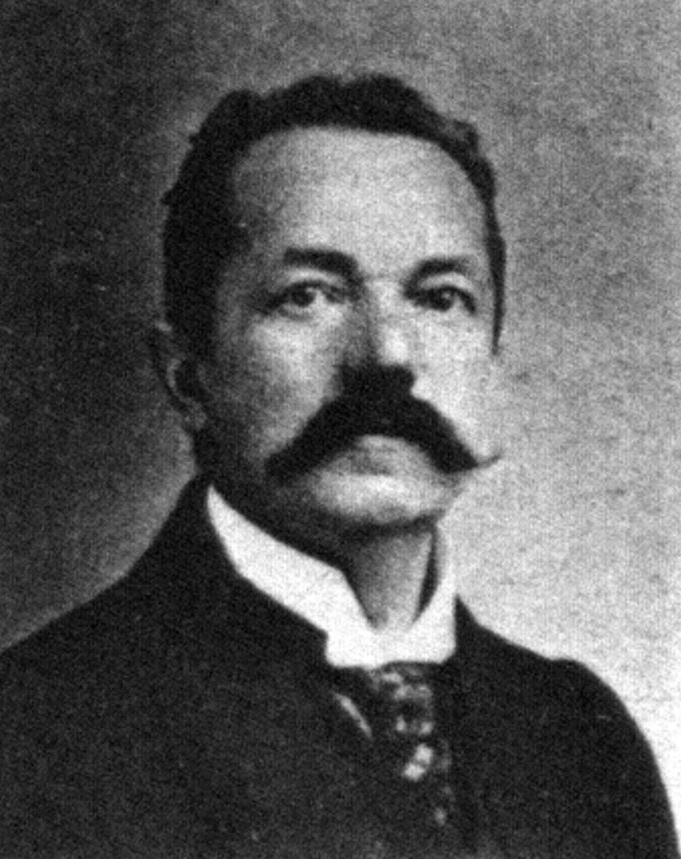
- Eichhorn c. 1920

Member of the Reichstag for Berlin
- In office 24 June 1920 – 26 July 1925
- Preceded by: Constituency established
- Succeeded by: Karl Tiedt

Member of the National Assembly for Berlin
- In office 6 February 1919 – 21 May 1920
- Preceded by: Office established
- Succeeded by: Office abolished

President of the Berlin Police
- In office 16 November 1918 – 3 January 1919
- Preceded by: Heinrich von Oppen
- Succeeded by: Eugen Ernst

Member of the Reichstag for Baden 9
- In office 16 June 1903 – 12 January 1912
- Preceded by: Georg Frank
- Succeeded by: Albert Wittum

Personal details
- Born: October 9, 1863 Röhrsdorf, Chemnitz, Kingdom of Saxony, German Empire
- Died: July 26, 1925 (aged 61) Berlin, Weimar Germany
- Party: SPD (1881–1917); USPD (1917–1920); KPD (after 1920)
- Other political affiliations: KAG (1921–1922)
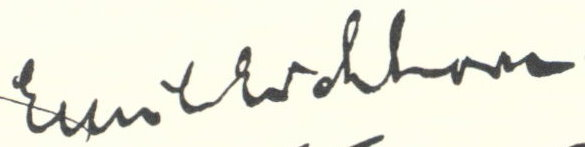
- Signature

Robert Emil Eichhorn (9 October 1863 – 26 July 1925) was a German politician and journalist who served as President of the Berlin Police during the German Revolution of 1918–1919. His dismissal from that position triggered the Spartacist Uprising. Before his political career, while working as the editor for the Dresden based Sächsischen Arbeiterzeitung, he was also one of Germany's top amateur road cyclists.

== Biography ==
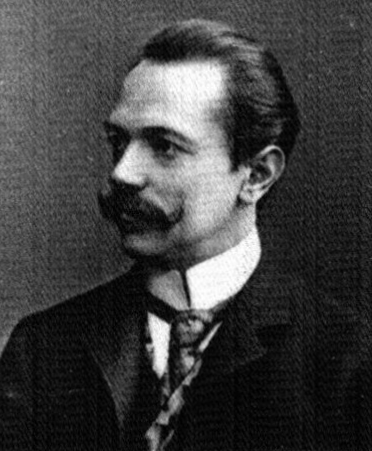
Eichhorn's official Reichstag portrait, 1907

Eichhorn was born in Röhrsdorf (now part of Chemnitz) in the Kingdom of Saxony in October 1863 and became apprenticed as a glass worker in 1878, becoming active in the Social Democratic Party of Germany (SPD). He became a full-time official in 1893 and was the head of its press office from 1908–17, when he left with others to form the USPD where he played a similar role. Eichorn worked for the post-revolutionary Russian Telegraph Agency in Berlin.

On 9 November 1918 he led the occupation of police headquarters in Berlin, the infantry guarding the building surrendering their weapons without a struggle. Inside the building Eichhorn took over the office of police chief and 600 political prisoners were set free. Amongst his deputies was Revolutionary Stewards activist Anton Grylewicz.

The attempt to dismiss Eichhorn by the Prussian cabinet on 4 January 1919 and to replace him with the SPD politician Eugen Ernst provoked mass opposition and a general strike, with Eichhorn declaring the following day in front of a mass demonstration of 200,000, "I got my job from the Revolution, and I shall give it up only to the Revolution." The attempt to remove Eichhorn had been preceded by slander in Vorwärts accusing him of having received Russian gold, possessing stolen foodstuffs and illegally bought arms. On 6 January both the Central Committee of the councils and the Berlin executive approved the decision to remove Eichhorn. Earlier that day his supporters had occupied several buildings, including the Vorwärts office, in the precursor to the Spartacist uprising.

In 1920, Eichhorn joined the KPD when it merged with the USPD left. After Paul Levi was expelled in 1921, Eichhorn joined the Communist Working Group (KAG) for a short time. However, he remained a member of the KPD and a KPD deputy until he died in Berlin in July 1925.
