= Communist Working Group (Germany) =

Splinter of the Communist Party of Germany

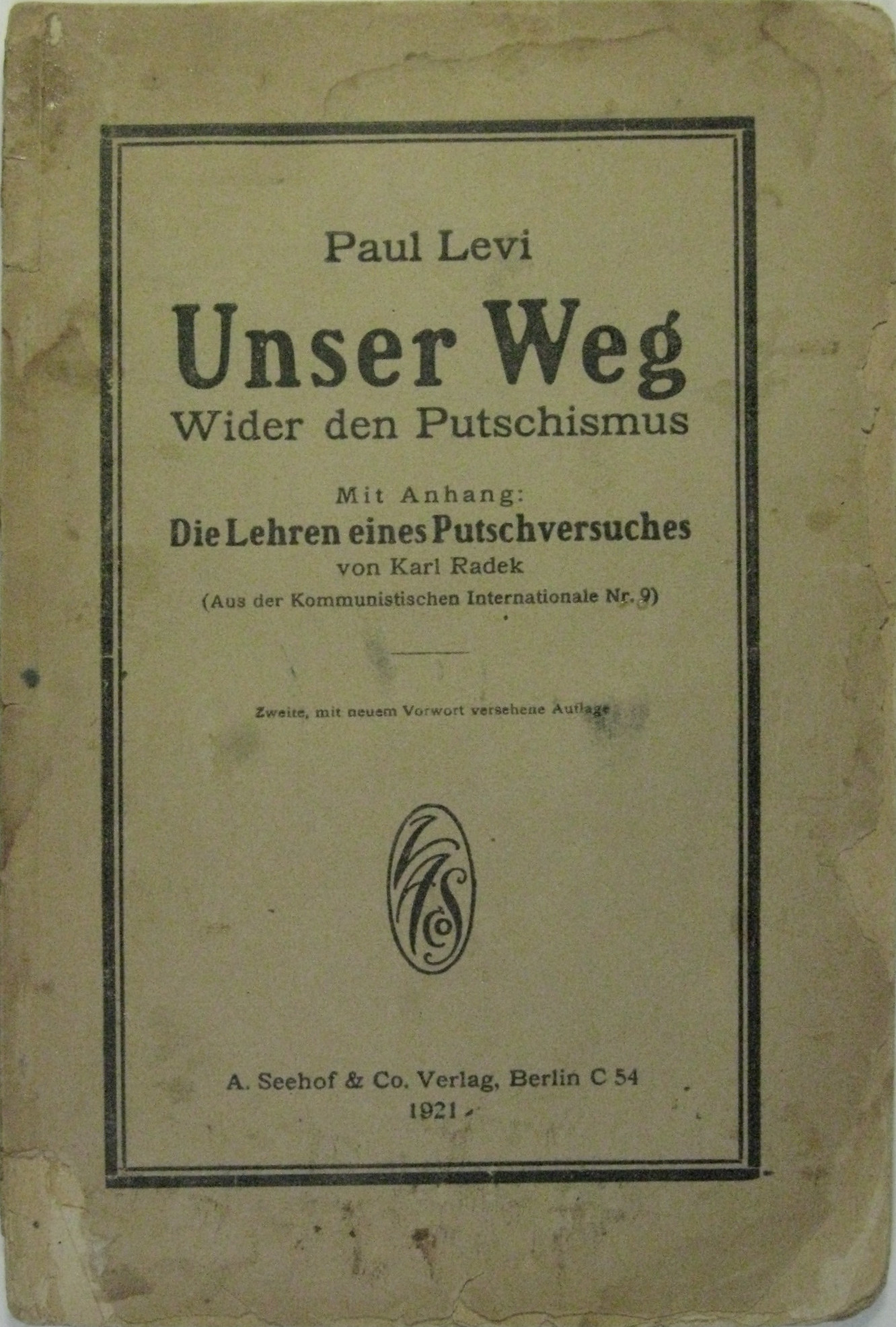
The cover of Levi's Our Way: Against Putschism, published 1921

The Communist Working Group (German: Kommunistische Arbeitsgemeinschaft; KAG) was a short-lived political party in Germany during the Weimar Republic that existed from 1921 to 1922. Created by the former head of the Communist Party, Paul Levi, the organization was formed following his ousting in response to criticism of the March uprising. In 1922, the KAG merged with the USPD.

== History ==
In his pamphlet Our Way: Against Putschism, Levi publicly criticized the putschist tactics of the KPD during the March Uprising of 1921, the so-called "Offensive Theory." After maintaining this criticism of the German and international leadership of the Communists, he was expelled from the KPD at the instigation of the majority of the Comintern leadership around Grigory Zinoviev and the majority of the party executive. The majority of the Reichstag faction, however, supported Levi's criticism. Vladimir Lenin lamented that Levi ended up as a "deviant":

"Levi lost his head. He was, however, the only one in Germany who had one to lose."

Levi and others expelled from or who left the VKPD, such as co-chairman Ernst Däumig, as well as Adolph Hoffmann, Bernhard Düwell, Otto Brass, and Richard Müller, joined together to form the Communist Working Group (KAG). Clara Zetkin, who shared Levi's criticism, resigned from her executive positions but remained in the KPD.

=== 1922 split ===
The majority of the KAG merged again in the spring of 1922 with the Independent Social Democratic Party (USPD), from which the KPD had split in December 1918. Along with the vast majority of USPD members, a large proportion of the former KAG members also joined the SPD at the end of 1922; a few, such as Paul Wegmann and Oskar Rusch, remained in the remaining USPD. Some KAG members, such as the four Reichstag deputies Georg Berthelé, Emil Eichhorn, Heinrich Malzahn, and Hermann Reich, did not follow this path. The first three returned to the KPD, while Reich initially became a guest member of the KPD parliamentary group.

=== Second KAG ===
A short-lived "ultra-left" KPD splinter group founded in 1926 in Thuringia, led by Landtag members Otto Geithner, Agnes Schmidt, and Hans Schreyer, was named the Communist Working Group, but had no organizational or programmatic continuity with the KAG (Communist Action Group) that existed from 1921 to 1922. In the 1927 state elections, it received 0.47% of the vote. For a time, Geithner collaborated with Karl Korsch. Later, the group joined the Socialist Workers' Party of Germany (SAPD).

== Members ==
=== Leaders ===
- Paul Levi
- Ernst Däumig

=== Reichstag deputies ===
- Georg Berthelé
- Otto Brass
- Bernhard Düwell
- Emil Eichhorn
- Philipp Fries
- Curt Geyer
- Friedrich Geyer
- Adolph Hoffmann
- Heinrich Malzahn
- Hermann Reich
- Marie Wackwitz
- Paul Wegmann

=== Other members ===
- Henriette Ackermann
- Paul Franken
- Anna Geyer
- Georg Ulrich Handke
- Mathilde Jacob
- Otto Kunze
- Richard Müller
- Karl Rehbein
- Oskar Rusch
- Max Sievers
- Willy Ziegler

== Sources ==
- Charlotte Beradt: Paul Levi. Ein demokratischer Sozialist in der Weimarer Republik. Europäische Verlagsanstalt, Frankfurt am Main 1969.
- Paul Levi: Zwischen Spartakus und Sozialdemokratie. Schriften, Aufsätze, Reden und Briefe. Herausgegeben und eingeleitet von Charlotte Beradt. Europäische Verlagsanstalt u. a., Frankfurt am Main u. a. 1969.
- Bernd Dieter Fritz: Die Kommunistische Arbeitsgemeinschaft (KAG) im Vergleich mit der KPO und SAP. Eine Studie zur politischen Ideologie des deutschen „Rechts“-Kommunismus in der Zeit der Weimarer Republik. Bonn 1966 (Bonn, Universität, Dissertation, 1966).
