= Philipp Fries =

German politician (1882–1950)

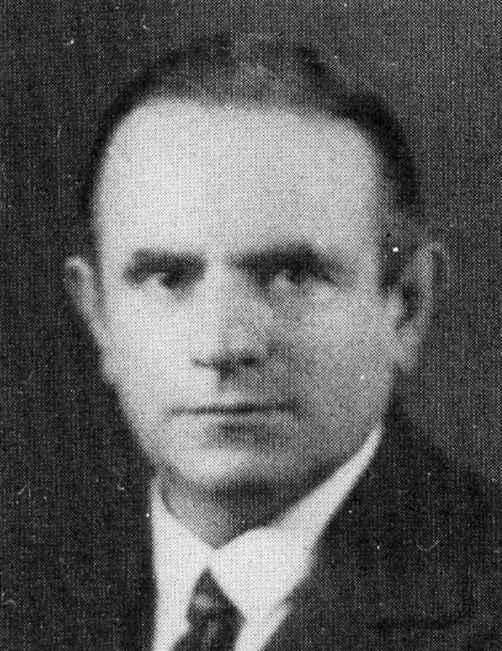
- Fries c. 1932
- Born: 9 August 1882; Roggendorf (Mechernich), Rhine Province, Germany
- Died: 7 December 1950 (aged 68); Cologne, North Rhine-Westphalia, West Germany
- Occupation: Politician
- Political party: SPD; USPD; VKPD; KAG

Philipp Fries (9 August 1882 – 7 December 1950) was a German politician (SPD, USPD, KPD). He sat as a member of the national parliament ("Reichstag") between 1920 and 1924.

== Life ==
Philipp Fries was born in Roggendorf (Mechernich), then a village in the Eifel hills southwest of Cologne. His father was a railway official. He attended school in Roggendorf between 1888 and 1896 before training as a tailor. He then spent time as a wandering journeyman. He performed his military service between 1903 and 1905.

Fries joined the Social Democratic Party (SPD) in 1900, becoming politically active in the trades union movement and the party from 1907, while continuing to work in tailoring till 1919. In 1910 he became district party chairman in Cologne, becoming in 1914 a member of the Upper Rhine Party Regional Executive ("SPD Bezirksvorstand Oberrhein"). In October 1919 he became a Cologne city councillor.

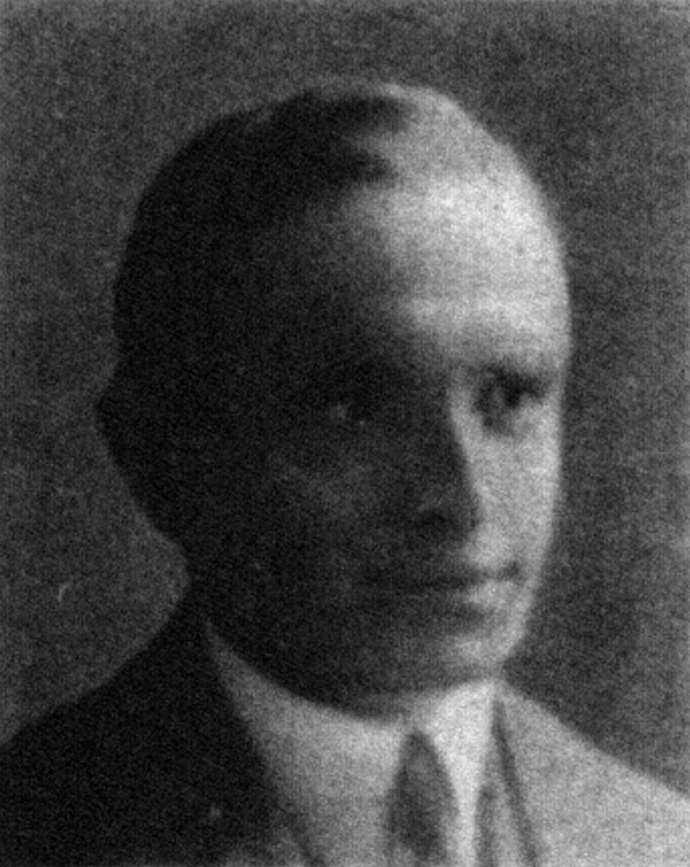
Fries's official Reichstag portrait, 1920

He undertook his war service between 1914 and 1918 but was able to remain politically engaged. The decision of the party leadership to agree what amounted to a parliamentary truce on the issue of war funding for the duration of the war proved contentious within the SPD from the outset: in June 1915 Philipp Friess was one of seven party activists in Cologne to add their signatures to a letter of protest drafted by Karl Liebknecht and addressed to the Party Executive on the matter. Two years later the SPD finally split apart over the same issue: Fries was a member of the breakaway faction that now became the Independent Social Democratic Party ("Unabhängige Sozialdemokratische Partei Deutschlands" / USPD). As a USPD candidate he was elected in June 1920 to the newly constituted national parliament ("Reichstag"), representing Electoral District 23 (Cologne-Aachen).

Within the USPD, he was a strong advocate both for linking up with the Communist International (Comintern) launched the previous year in Moscow and for a party merger in Germany between the USPD and the newly formed Communist Party of Germany. In October 1920 he took part in the USPD party conference at Halle and then, early in December 1920, in what became the "Unification" party conference in Berlin at which most (though not all) USPD members switched to what came to be known without irony, at least for a few months, as the United Communist Party of Germany ("Vereinigte Kommunistische Partei Deutschlands" / VKPD), in which he was in the same month elected to the national control commission ("zentrale Revisionskommission"). In Cologne he became regional chair for the VKPD.

Within the Reichstag he joined with other USPD members and two Communist members, Paul Levi and Clara Zetkin, to form the VKPD faction. Party unity proved elusive, however, and during the first part of 1921, in the wake of the ill-fated "March Action", Fries was one of those who resigned from the VKPD with Paul Levi and together set up the short-lived Communist Working Group ("Kommunistische Arbeitsgemeinschaft" / KAG). By April 1922 he was back in the SPD.

Between 1919 and 1921, and again between 1924 and 1933, Philipp Fries served as a Cologne city councillor. Between 1924 and 1933, he also sat as an SPD member of the Prussian regional parliament ("Landtag"). By this time Fries had gained a reputation as an effective public speaker, and after 1922 he found himself ferociously and repeatedly attacked by his Communist former comrades as a "renegade".

The political backdrop changed dramatically after January 1933 when he Nazi party took power and lost no time in transforming Germany into a one-party dictatorship. The Reichstag fire at the end of February 1933 was immediately blamed on "communists", and politicians who were or had been active in communist politics found themselves at the top of the government target list. Philipp Fries was arrested in June 1933 an interned successively in the concentration camps at Esterwegen and Lichtenburg. However, he was released in December 1933. Following the unsuccessful attempt on the leader's life in July 1944 a mass-arrest of non-Nazis took place on the night of 22/23 August 1944. Philipp Fries was arrested and detained for a time, after which, fearing further arrest or worse, he spent the rest of the war in hiding.

After the war ended, formally in May 1945, Cologne found itself in the British occupation zone. Amid much uncertainty there was a widespread assumption that the end of the war would mark a return to multi-party democracy, and in the second half of 1945 Philipp Fries was involved in re-establishing the SPD in Cologne where, till 1947, he served as chair of the party for the local sub-region and as a member of the party executive for the Middle Rhein district. Between 2 October 1946 and 19 April 1947 he was a member of the regional parliament ("Landtag") for the newly defined state of North Rhine-Westphalia. There having not yet been time to organise elections, seats were allocated to the political parties at the direction of the military occupation forces, allocating seats to democratic parties in the proportions defined by the elections of 1932, which were widely considered to be the last free and fair election in Germany. Fries's own tenure was cut short in April 1947 when he retired from politics on grounds of ill-health.

He died in Cologne on 7 December 1950.
