= Max Sievers =

Chairman of the German Freethinkers League (1887–1944)

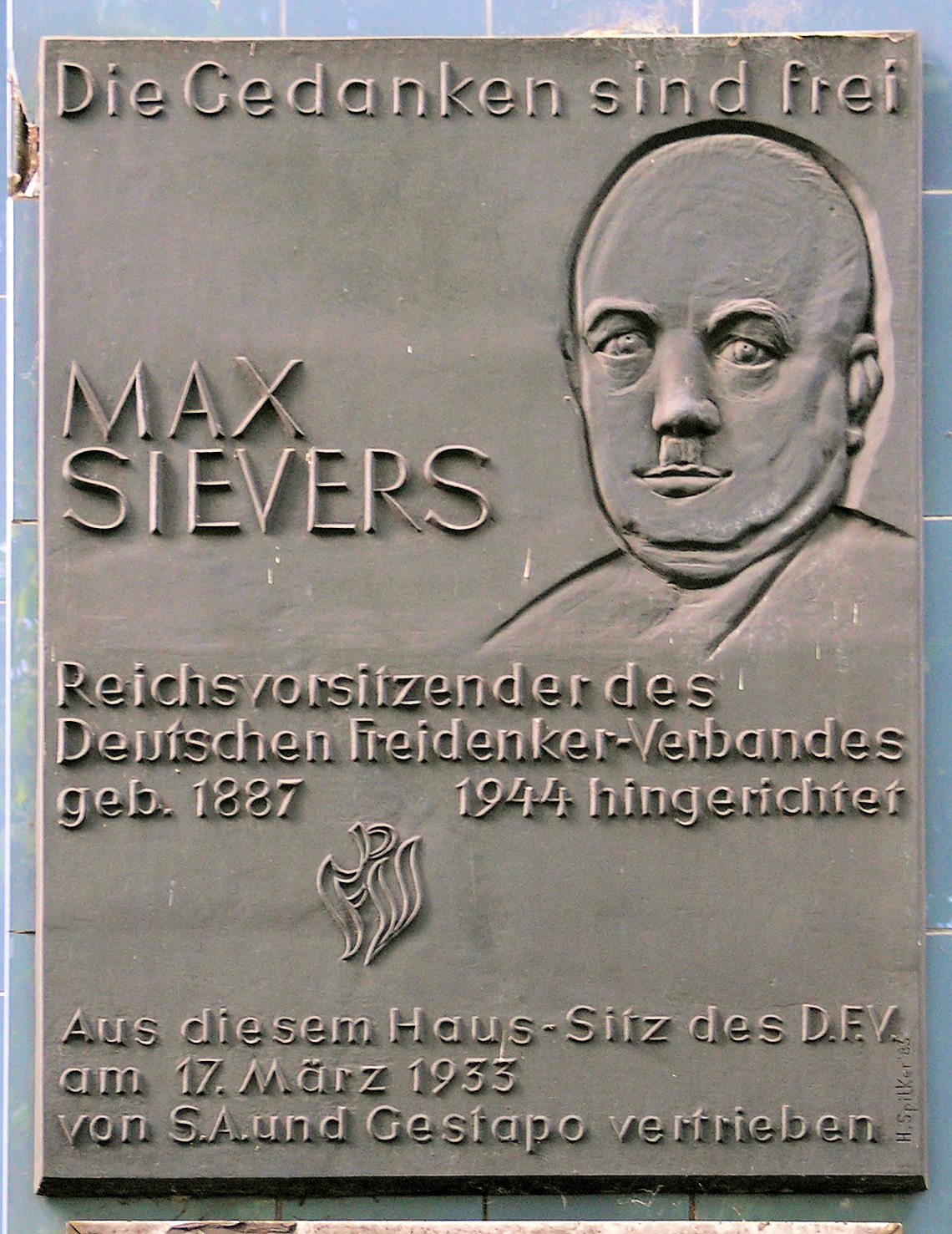
Memorial plaque of Max Sievers

Max Georg Wilhelm Sievers (11 June 1887 in Tempelhof, Berlin – 17 January 1944 in Brandenburg an der Havel) was chairman of the German Freethinkers League, writer and active communist, later social democrat.

== Life ==
=== Politics ===
Max Sievers opposed the first world war and was an unwilling participant and suffered an arm injury in 1915. The experiences during the war led him to become politically active. He became a socialist, editing the Arbeiter-Rats (German: 'Workers' Council') and joining the Independent Social Democratic Party of Germany (USPD) by 1919 among other things. In 1920, he joined the Communist Party of Germany (KPD) even serving as a secretary of its headquarters when needed. However, he was strongly critical of the March Action (attempted Putsch) and as a result left the organization for the Communist Working Group (KAG), a group of communists who opposed the tactics of the KPD. However, the group began falling apart, and by 1927 Sievers had joined the Social Democratic Party of Germany (SPD). During the post-Reichstag fire crackdown on the left he was placed into "protective custody". Unlike most left-wing activists, Sievers was released a few months later and left for Belgium. He remained active and advocated bringing about a socialist government to replace the Nazis.

=== Freethought ===
In 1922 he became active in the organization, Union of Freethinkers for Cremation, gaining an administrative position. He started the freethought publication "Der Freidenker" in 1925. In 1927 he was elected as chairman of the German Freethinkers League. By 1930 the organization boasted 600,000 members and took on the new name. Sievers opposed the Nazi government in his freethought articles, writing of the Reichskonkordat as an "alliance" between the Nazi government and the clergy and promoting the idea they be replaced with a Soviet model. He wrote the book "Unser Kampf gegen das Dritte Reich" to outline many of his objections with the third reich.

== Death ==
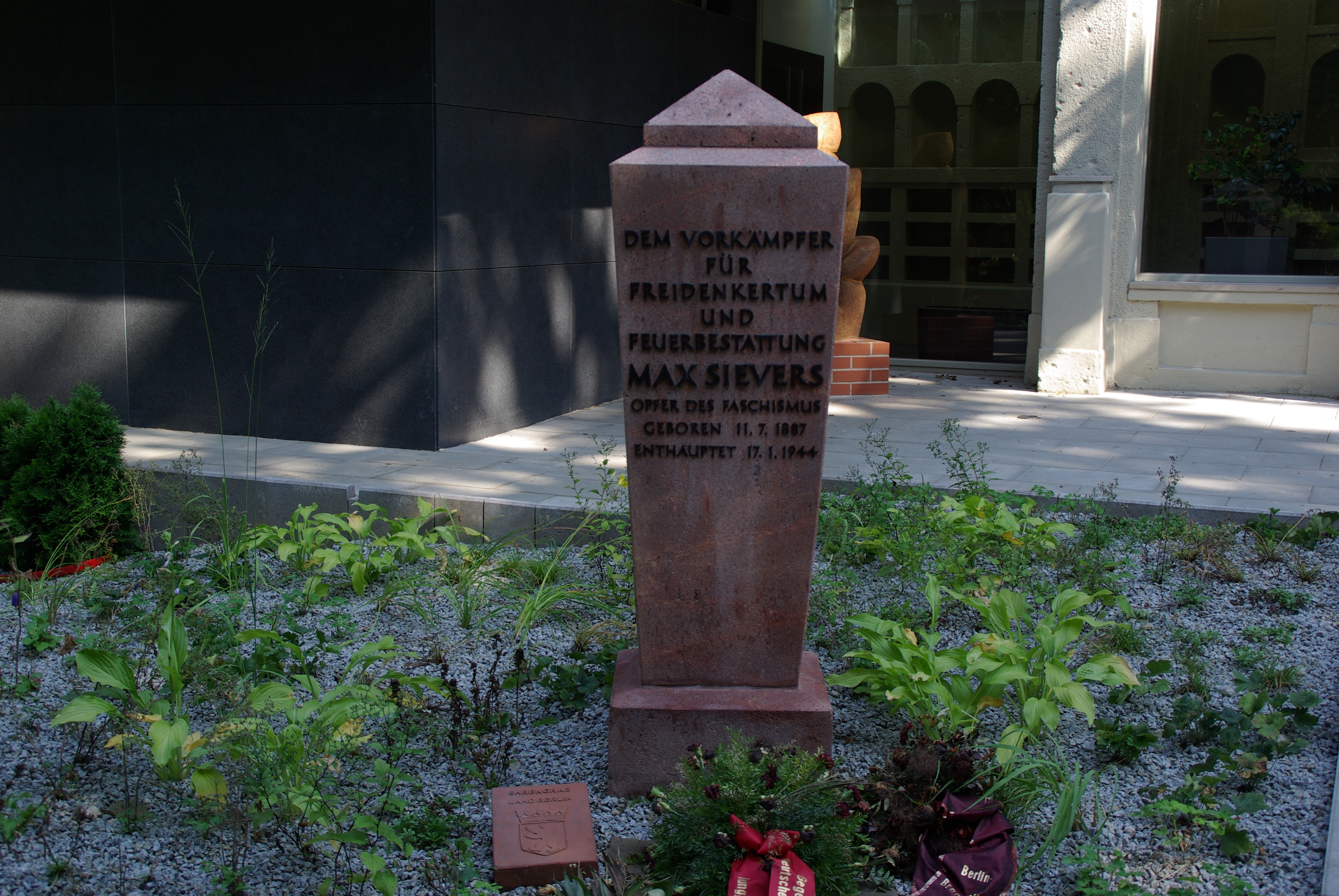
Tombstone of Max Sievers

Sievers immigrated to the United States in 1939, but he could not get a visa, so he returned to Belgium. He was arrested on 3 June 1943 by the Gestapo, sentenced on 17 November 1943 to death by the Volksgerichtshof, with a former Marxist, Roland Freisler, presiding, for "conspiracy to commit high treason along with favouring the enemy", and beheaded at the guillotine on 17 January 1944 at Brandenburg Prison.

== Literature ==
- Heiner Jestrabek: Max Sievers. Freidenker, Sozialist, Antifaschist (1887–1944), in: Jahrbuch für Forschungen zur Geschichte der Arbeiterbewegung, No. II/2008.
