= Reichstag Bloodbath =

1920 riots against passage of the Works Councils Act in Berlin, Germany

Massacre in front of the Reichstag on 13 January 1920
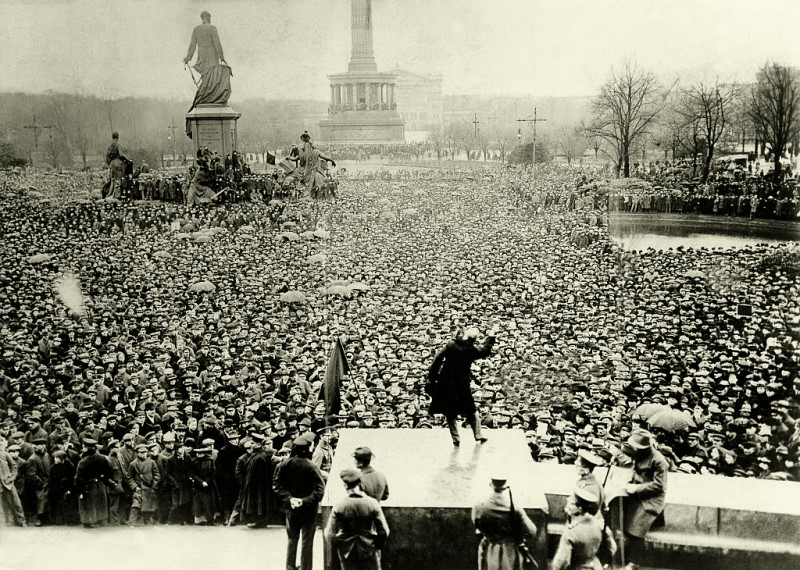
- Date: 13 January 1920
- Location: Reichstag building in Berlin, Germany; 52.5186°N 13.3763°E
- Caused by: Passage of the Works Councils Act (German: Betriebsrätegesetz) limiting workers' rights
- Methods: Rioting, gunfire

Parties
Weimar Republic: Sicherheitspolizei	Communist Party of Germany; Independent Social Democratic Party of Germany; Rioting workers

Deaths and injuries
- Deaths: 20–42
- Injuries: ~105

The Reichstag Bloodbath (German: Blutbad vor dem Reichstag) occurred on 13 January 1920 in front of the Reichstag building in Berlin during negotiation by the Weimar National Assembly on the Works Councils Act (Betriebsrätegesetz). The number of people killed and injured is controversial, but it is certainly the bloodiest demonstration in German history. The event was a historic event that was overshadowed two months later by the Kapp Putsch but remained in Berlin's labour movement and security forces' collective memory.

== Background ==
The government hoped to limit union activity by passing the Works Council Act. The left-wing German political parties the Independent Social Democratic Party of Germany (USPD) and Communist Party of Germany (KPD) backed the workers who wanted unrestricted organizing powers. To push their point a protest was called for on 13 January 1920, in front of the Reichstag.

== Riot ==
The protection of the building lay with the militarily organized security police (Sipo). Between September 1919 and January 1920, the Reich Government, which was led by the Social Democrats and in continued cooperation with the Army Command, was specially set up in Berlin to protect the existing order, because the existing Berlin police force during the November Revolution and during the uprising had failed. The Sipo consisted mainly of former Freikorps members and was commanded by army officers. Numerous relatives and officers were clearly right-wing extremists. Neither the leadership nor the police on the ground had extensive training. Smaller Sipoverbände with machine guns were stationed in the Reichstag building, bigger front of the entrance of the building at King Square and along Samson Street.

On 13 January, starting at around 12 noon, most of the large companies in Berlin stopped working; these include, for example, AEG, Siemens, Daimler and Knorr-Bremse. The workers moved to the inner city on Königsplatz in front of the Reichstag, but many only came to the adjacent side streets due to the crowds. Though numbers vary considerably, according to Weipert it was "at least 100,000, probably there were significantly more." Speakers from the USPD, the KPD and the works council center made speeches. There were several assaults on Members of parliament (MPs) on their way to the session. After the last speech fell silent, the protesters did not leave the square. Before the President of the Reichstag, Constantin Fehrenbach, opened at 3:19 p.m., demonstrators in several places had begun to taunt Sipo men, to push them away, this quickly escalated into groups of protestors disarming and abusing the Sipo guards. Conversely, the police fought back with the pistol blows of their carbines; but individual officers were reprimanded by their superiors for these actions. In the meantime, the USPD MPs in the plenary either asked for the Sipo to be withdrawn from the building or for the debate to be closed. As a result of a massive disturbance by the USPD faction, Fehrenbach had to interrupt the meeting at 3:48 p.m.

MPs who were now watching the tumult on the Königsplatz from the windows of the Reichstag were threatened with revolvers by excited demonstrators. One person from the crowd fired shots at Portal II of the Reichstag building. At least one police officer was hit. Members of the metalworkers' union immediately took the gun from the gunman – apparently captured by the Sipo – and beat him up. The majority of the demonstrators were calm anyway or even tried to prevent the police from being aggressive.

The events that followed were highly controversial among contemporaries - and still are in research to this day. One version, represented among others by the then Chancellor Gustav Bauer, blamed the escalation on the demonstrators and especially the organizers. According to this, around 4:00 p.m. demonstrators tried to enter the building, whereupon the Sipo on Königsplatz opened fire and threw hand grenades at the rally participants. Independent and communists, on the other hand, emphasized that the shooting had been done for no reason and without warning. It is unclear whether the warnings existed. Almost all the dead and injured were found south of the Reichstag, on the opposite sidewalk and in the adjacent zoo, according to reports from various sides. There, on Simsonstrasse, the crowd was at least four meters away from the police. So there were no violent attacks during the storming of the building. Most of the victims were hit here. After the shots broke out the crowd fled in panic, the Sipo fired several more minutes with their rifles and machine guns. Nowhere in the sources claims that demonstrators would have been shot back. The figures for the victims vary between 42 dead and 105 injured on the part of the demonstrators and around 20 dead, including one police officer, and around 100 injured, including 15 police officers. In any case, the casualties of this event were the largest for any demonstration in German history.

When Fehrenbach reopened the meeting at 4:13 p.m., the USPD requested that the meeting be adjourned immediately with the note "There are dead and seriously wounded people downstairs in the house". The President was not convinced of the reason but asked the plenary the question of supporters. Only a tiny minority supported the request, but stormy protests by the USPD led to another interruption at 4:37 p.m. After the reopening at 5:09 p.m. Fehrenbach, who had now taken note of the fatalities, closed the trial at 5:11 p.m.

The works council law passed the National Assembly at a subsequent meeting on 18 January. With the announcement in the Reichsgesetzblatt, it came into force on 4 February 1920.

== Aftermath ==
After the riot, a total exclusion zone for demonstrations was declared around the immediate vicinity of the Reichstag (the Bannmeile Decree), which still remains in force. The workers' concerns were ignored and, on 3 February 1920, the Works' Councils Act (German: Betriebsrätegesetz) was passed.

== See also ==
- Works council
- Works Constitution Act

== Bibliography ==
Notes

References

- Feldman, Gerald D. (1997). The Great Disorder: Politics, Economics, and Society in the German Inflation, 1914–1924. Oxford University Press. ISBN 9780199880195. – Total pages: 1040
- Fisher, Ruth (1948). Stalin and German Communism. Transaction Publishers. ISBN 9781412835015. – Total pages: 687
- Liang, Hsi-huey (1970). The Berlin Police Force in the Weimar Republic. University of California Press. ISBN 9780520016033.
- Weipert, Axel (2012). "Vor den Toren der Macht. Die Demonstration am 13. Januar 1920 vor dem Reichstag" (PDF). Arbeit - Bewegung - Geschichte [At the gates of power. The demonstration on 13 January 1920 in front of the Reichstag]. 11 (2): 16–32. ISSN 1610-093X. OCLC 49930935.
