= Otto Brass =

German communist politician and anti-fascist activist (1875-1950)

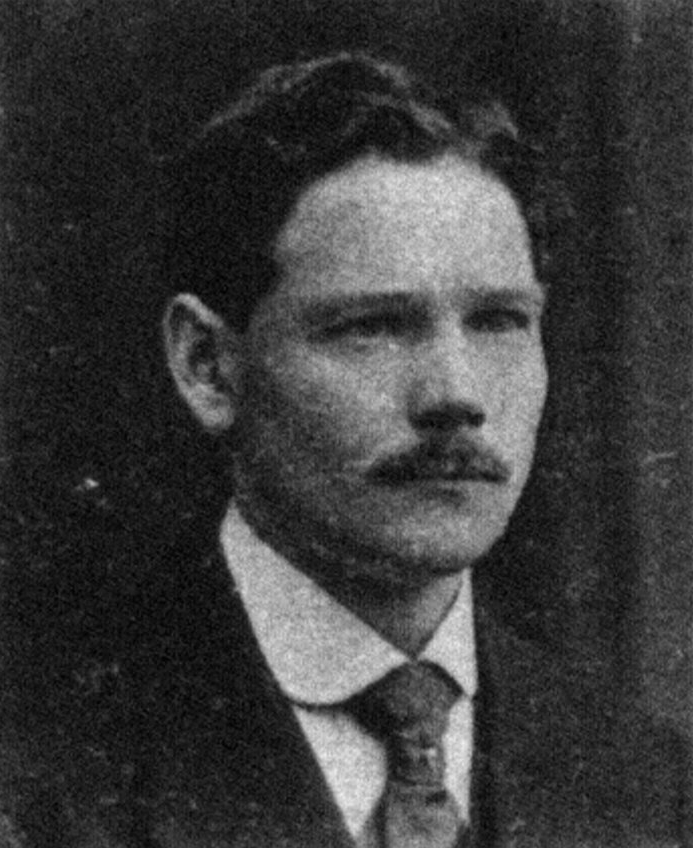
Brass's official National Assembly portrait, 1919

Otto Brass (21 December 1875 – 13 November 1950) was a German communist politician and anti-fascist activist.

Born in Wermelskirchen in the Rhine Province, Brass became a file maker. In 1903, he became an administrator of the Remscheid workers' health insurance fund, then was appointed the business manager of the local socialist newspaper. He became active in the Social Democratic Party of Germany (SPD), but due to his opposition to World War I, in 1917, he joined the Independent Social Democratic Party of Germany (USPD) split. He was active in the workers' and soldiers' council movement.

In 1919, Brass was elected to the Weimar National Assembly, then serving in the Reichstag. He supported strikes in February and April 1919, while cautioning moderation. He was a founding member of the Communist Party of Germany (KPD), serving on its central committee, although he resigned from that in February 1921. He then opposed the March Action uprising, and so was expelled from the KPD at the start of 1922. He joined up with the Communist Working Group, and followed it in rejoining the USPD, which in turn then rejoined the SPD.

Brass lost his seat in the Reichstag in 1924, and became a publisher in Berlin. He was a leading member of the German Popular Front, and anti-Nazi group, in the 1930s, but was arrested in 1938 and spent the entirety of World War II in Brandenburg Prison. After the war, he rejoined the KPD and lived in East Berlin, serving on the executive of the Free German Trade Union Federation.
