= Ernst Däumig =

German politician (1868–1922)

Ernst Friedrich Däumig
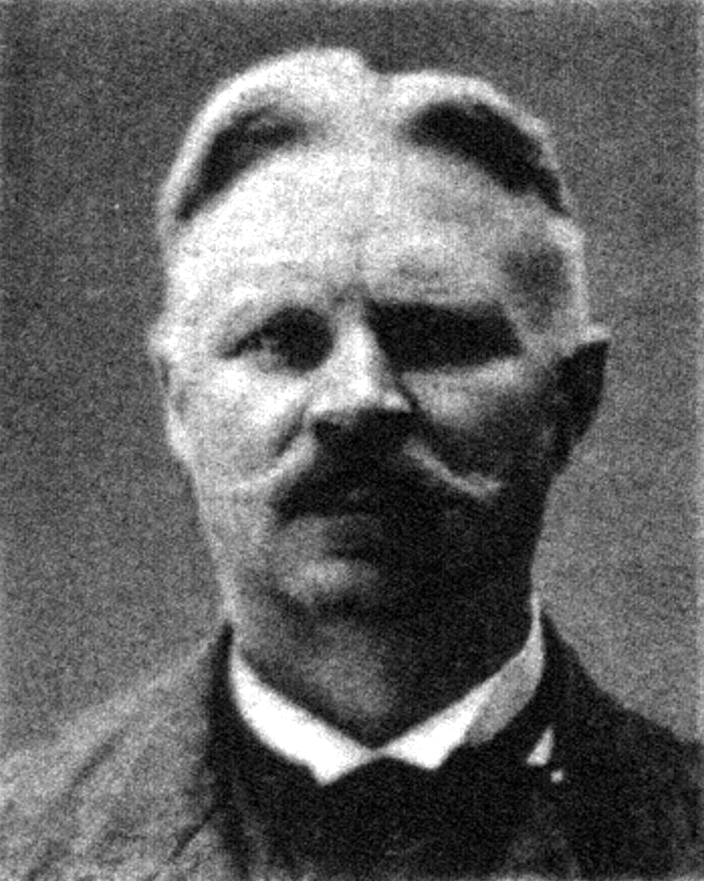
- Däumig c. 1920

Chairman of the Communist Party of Germany
- In office 4 December 1920 – February 1921
- Serving with: Paul Levi
- Succeeded by: Heinrich Brandler

Chairman of the Independent Social Democratic Party of Germany
- In office December 1919 – 4 December 1920
- Serving with: Arthur Crispien (1919–1920); Adolph Hoffmann (1920)
- Preceded by: Hugo Haase
- Succeeded by: Georg Ledebour

Member of the Reichstag for Potsdam II
- In office 24 June 1920 – 4 July 1922
- Preceded by: Constituency established
- Succeeded by: Paul Wegmann

Personal details
- Born: 25 November 1868 Merseburg, Province of Saxony, Kingdom of Prussia, North German Confederation
- Died: 4 July 1922 (aged 53) Berlin, Weimar Republic
- Party: SPD (1898–1917); USPD (1917–1920, 1922); KPD (1920–1921); KAG (1921–1922)
- Occupation: Politician; Journalist; Newspaper Editor
- Known for: Advocacy for council democracy, leadership in the German revolution of 1918–1919, co-chairmanship of USPD and KPD, editorship of Die Freiheit and Der Arbeiter-Rat

Ernst Friedrich Däumig (25 November 1868 in Merseburg – 4 July 1922 in Berlin) was a German politician, journalist and newspaper editor who became co-chairman of both the Independent Social Democratic Party of Germany (USPD) and Communist Party of Germany (KPD).

== Early years ==
Däumig was a member of the French Foreign Legion, joining the Social Democratic Party of Germany before the first world war and became a journalist on Vorwärts in 1911. He opposed the war, and in 1917 he helped to found the USPD and became the Chief Editor of Die Freiheit from 1917–1918.

== November Revolution ==
In 1918, Däumig maintained close contacts with the leadership of the Revolutionary Stewards and welcomed the October Revolution early on. He developed into the spokesman for the left wing of the party, which was in favor of council democracy. Däumig propagated the council idea primarily in the journal Der Arbeiter-Rat, which he had published since January 1919. Däumig, although a supporter of the Russian Revolution, believed that the Bolshevik model of the Soviets was too hierarchical and reliant on party discipline. Däumig described his "pure council-system" as a living organism in which the central organs are “continually controlled by cells of elected bodies in factories and professions [that are] active at all times and distributed across the entire country.” His theories in return were heavily criticized by Vladimir Lenin.

During the November Revolution he was sent to the Prussian War Ministry as an alderman and became a member of the Berlin Executive Council. Däumig made the main motion at the Reichsrätekongress in December 1918, which replaced the convening of the National Assembly envisaged anchoring the council system in the future state structure; this was rejected by the delegates with a large majority. On January 5, 1919, at the conference of the political leaders of the Revolutionary Stewards, the USPD and the KPD, Däumig warned against taking up the fight against the Ebert government, as most of those present wanted, because he estimated the chances of success to be very low. With Richard Müller and four others, he voted against a large majority against the attempt to overthrow the government and only advocated the general strike. From 1918 to 1920 he was one of the leading figures in the Berlin council movement and got involved during the general strike in March 1919, as well as the establishment of the Berlin works council headquarters.

Däumig was arrested on the morning of 8 November.

== Communist Party ==
Däumig was amongst the delegates to the 2nd World Congress of the Comintern with three other members of the USPD, supporting the 21 conditions for admittance and defending them at the Halle congress of the USPD. After the USPD split and the left wing joined the KPD, Däumig became co-chairman with Paul Levi, resigning alongside him in 1921 after the events of the March Action. They later co-founded the Communist Working Group.
