= Berlin (electoral district) =

Former constituency of the Reichstag (Weimar Republic)

2 Berlin
- Former electoral constituency for the Reichstag
- Location within the Weimar Republic
- State: Prussia
- Province: Berlin
- Electorate: 1,398,476 (1919); 1,495,962
- Major settlements: Kreuzberg, Wedding, Friedrichshain, Prenzlauer Berg, Tiergarten, Mitte

Former constituency
- Created: 1919
- Abolished: 1936

Berlin was one of the 35 electoral districts (German: Wahlkreise) used to elect members to the Reichstag during the Weimar Republic. It sent members to the Reichstag in nine democratic elections between 1919 and 1933. It existed nominally in the November 1933 show election to the Nazi Reichstag but was redistricted for the March 1936 election.

It comprised the urban core of Berlin within the Free State of Prussia, corresponding to the city's boundaries prior to the Greater Berlin Act. It was constituency 2 in the numbering scheme. From the 1936 election on, constituency 2 was reconfigured to comprise the 10 western administrative districts of Berlin (Tiergarten, Wedding, Charlottenburg, Spandau, Wilmersdorf, Zehlendorf, Schöneberg, Steglitz, Tempelhof, and Reinickendorf) (Note: Despite later forming part of West Berlin, Kreuzberg and Neukölln were not included in the constituency as they were considered "eastern" boroughs at the time; the partition of Berlin into East and West was only established after World War II.) and was renamed "Berlin-West".

== Electoral system ==
The constituency was created for the January 1919 election. Under the proportional representation electoral system of the Weimar Republic, voters cast a vote for party lists. Parties were awarded a seat for every 60,000 votes in a constituency. Excess votes were aggregated at two higher levels of seat distribution: an intermediate level combining multiple constituencies, where extra seats were awarded to parties' constituency lists, and a national level where seats were awarded to national lists of each party or alliance.

== Results (1919–1933) ==
=== Vote share ===
Party	1919	1920	1924 I	1924 II	1928	1930	1932 I	1932 II	1933
KPD		1.3	20.6	19.2	29.6	33.0	33.5	37.7	30.0
USPD	27.6	42.7	3.1	0.7	0.2	0.1			
SPD	36.4	17.5	21.8	32.5	34.0	27.9	27.9	23.8	22.5
DDP	16.0	7.0	8.6	10.1	6.6	4.3	1.2	1.1	1.3
Centre	5.0	3.4	4.0	4.1	3.3	3.6	4.6	4.1	4.7
DVP	5.6	14.1	6.8	4.9	4.3	2.2	0.4	0.5	0.5
DNVP	9.3	11.5	21.5	22.0	15.7	11.7	6.7	8.8	9.1
Nazi			3.6	1.6	1.4	12.8	24.6	22.5	31.2
Other	0.0	2.4	10.0	5.0	5.0	4.4	1.2	1.4	0.5
Turnout	80.9	79.6	76.0	77.3	78.9	80.8	80.6	80.4	85.9
Source: Wahlen in Deutschland

=== Deputies ===
Election	Distribution	Seats
1919		14
1920		16
May 1924		14
Dec 1924		17
1928		17
1930		19
Jul 1932		16
Nov 1932		17
1933		19
Source: Wahlen in Deutschland
