= German Freethinkers League =

- Deutscher Freidenkerbund
- Abbreviation: DF
- Formation: April 10, 1881; 145 years ago
- Founder: Ludwig Büchner; Wilhelm Liebknecht

The German Freethinkers League ('Deutscher Freidenkerbund') was an organization founded in the late 19th century by German freethinkers and atheists with the main goal to oppose the power of the state churches in Germany. Its aim was to provide a public meeting-ground and forum for materialist and atheist thinkers in Germany. Renamed German Freethinkers Association (Deutscher Freidenker-Verband) in 1930, the organization was subsequently prohibited by the Nazi regime in 1933. At the time, the association had some 500,000 members. Reestablished at federal level in West Germany in 1951, the German Freethinkers Association consisted in 2004 of approximately 3000 members.

== History ==
The organization was founded in 1881 by the materialist philosopher and physician Ludwig Büchner and the socialist politician Wilhelm Liebknecht to oppose the power of the state churches in Germany. By 1885, the group had 5,000 members.

In 1930, the German Freethinkers League ('Deutscher Freidenkerbund') was renamed as Deutscher Freidenker-Verband (German Freethinkers Association) and Max Sievers was elected chairman. The largest organization of its sort in Germany at the time, by 1933, the German Freethinkers League had a membership numbering some 500,000. The Association was closed down in the spring of 1933 when the Nazi regime outlawed all atheistic and freethinking groups in Germany. Freethinkers Hall, the national headquarters of the League, was then converted to a bureau advising the public on church matters. Many freethinkers were active in the resistance. Max Sievers, the then chairman of the Freethinkers' Association, and general secretary Hermann Graul, managed to leave Germany in April 1933. Sievers immigrated to the United States in 1939, returned however subsequently to Europe, and after being detained in France by the Gestapo in 1943, he was executed at Brandenburg-Görden Prison on January 17, 1944.

=== Post–World War II ===
==== Deutscher Freidenker-Verband ====
Numerous new groups formed after the end of the Second World War. The first association at the state level was the Deutscher Freidenker-Verband (DFV) in Hamburg. The founding date was intentionally set to December 24, 1945.

In 1951, the DFV was re-established at the federal level in Braunschweig after the former General Secretary Hermann Graul emigrated and returned from exile in 1949. The DFV has been a member of the World Union of Freethinkers (WUF), based in Paris, since 1952.

==== Verband der Freidenker der DDR ====
In the GDR, the Association of Freethinkers was only founded on June 7, 1989, by 400 delegates at the Academy of Arts headquarters. Among other things, Erich Honecker was a member until the end of his life.

In 1991 the German Freethinkers Association (GDR) merged with the DFV in Braunschweig. Since then, the German Freethinkers Association has increasingly dealt with political issues and advocates justice, peace, and social, humane, and ecological action.

== See also ==
- German Humanist Association, another DF post-war reincarnation, formed in 1993, and a member of the International Humanist and Ethical Union.
