= Potsdam II (electoral district) =

Former constituency of the Reichstag (Weimar Republic)

3 Potsdam II
- Former electoral constituency for the Reichstag
- Location within the Weimar Republic
- State: Prussia
- Province: Brandenburg
- Electorate: 1,062,098 (1919); 1,454,777 (1933)
- Major settlements: Charlottenburg, Neukölln, Schöneberg, Wilmersdorf, Steglitz, Teltow

Former constituency
- Created: 1919
- Abolished: 1936

Potsdam II was one of the 35 electoral districts (German: Wahlkreise) used to elect members to the Reichstag during the Weimar Republic. It sent members to the Reichstag in nine democratic elections between 1919 and 1933. It existed nominally in the November 1933 show election to the Nazi Reichstag but was redistricted for the March 1936 election.

It comprised the southern suburbs of Berlin as well as the districts of Teltow and Beeskow-Storkow from the province of Brandenburg. It was constituency 3 in the numbering scheme. From the 1936 election on, constituency 3 was reconfigured to comprise only the 10 eastern administrative districts of Berlin (Mitte, Prenzlauer Berg, Friedrichshain, Kreuzberg, Neukölln, Treptow, Köpenick, Lichtenberg, Weißensee and Pankow) (Note: Despite later forming part of West Berlin, Kreuzberg and Neukölln were considered "eastern" boroughs at the time, as the partition of Berlin into East and West was only established after World War II.) and was renamed "Berlin-East".

== Electoral system ==
The constituency was created for the January 1919 election. Under the proportional representation electoral system of the Weimar Republic, voters cast a vote for party lists. Parties were awarded a seat for every 60,000 votes in a constituency. Excess votes were aggregated at two higher levels of seat distribution: an intermediate level combining multiple constituencies, where extra seats were awarded to parties' constituency lists, and a national level where seats were awarded to national lists of each party or alliance.

== Results (1919–1933) ==
=== Vote share ===
Party	1919	1920	1924 I	1924 II	1928	1930	1932 I	1932 II	1933
KPD		1.3	13.1	11.5	17.5	19.7	20.3	23.1	17.8
USPD	15.5	29.8	1.8	0.5	0.1	0.1			
SPD	35.8	17.4	18.0	26.7	30.6	25.9	26.3	22.7	20.6
DDP	21.0	10.5	10.0	12.5	9.6	7.0	2.1	1.9	2.4
Centre	3.8	2.8	3.3	3.5	3.1	3.4	5.2	4.6	5.2
DVP	10.8	21.6	10.6	8.6	9.2	5.3	1.1	1.7	1.2
WP			3.9	3.5	3.2	2.9	0.2	0.1	
DNVP	13.2	14.3	25.6	27.8	21.4	14.9	10.9	15.2	14.0
DSP			4.6	2.1	0.2				
Nazi			6.5	2.9	1.8	16.7	33.0	29.1	38.2
Other	0.0	2.3	2.6	0.6	3.4	4.2	0.8	1.5	0.6
Turnout	84.1	78.8	77.4	78.7	78.0	81.1	81.9	80.9	87.8
Source: Wahlen in Deutschland

=== Deputies ===
Election	Distribution	Seats
1919		9
1920		12
May 1924		11
Dec 1924		12
1928		14
1930		15
Jul 1932		18
Nov 1932		18
1933		20
Source: Wahlen in Deutschland
