= Die Freiheit (1918) =

German newspaper in Berlin (1918–22; 1928–31)

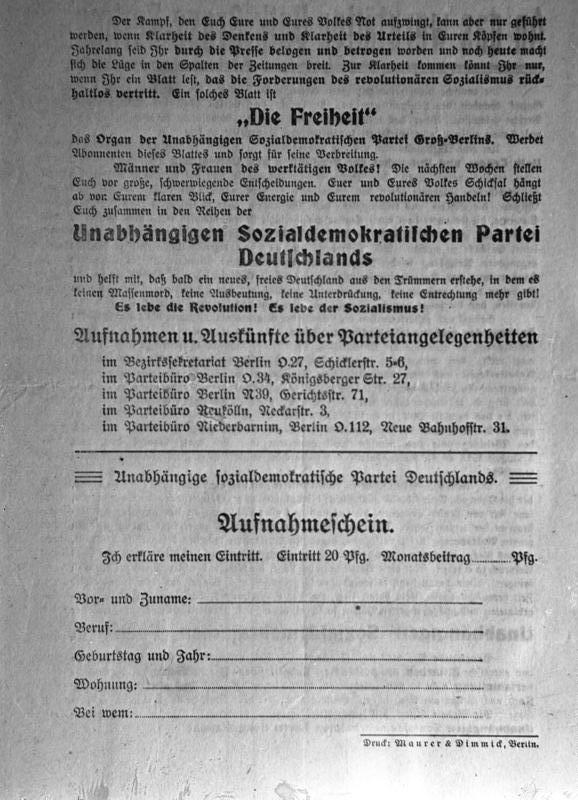
USPD leaflet advertising the newspaper Die Freiheit

Die Freiheit ('Freedom') was a daily newspaper published from Berlin between 1918 and 1922 as well as between 1928 and 1931. Die Freiheit was the organ of the Independent Social Democratic Party of Germany (USPD). Among the editor-in-chiefs of the newspaper were Rudolf Hilferding and Wilhelm Dittmann.
