= Paul Levi =

German politician (1883–1930)

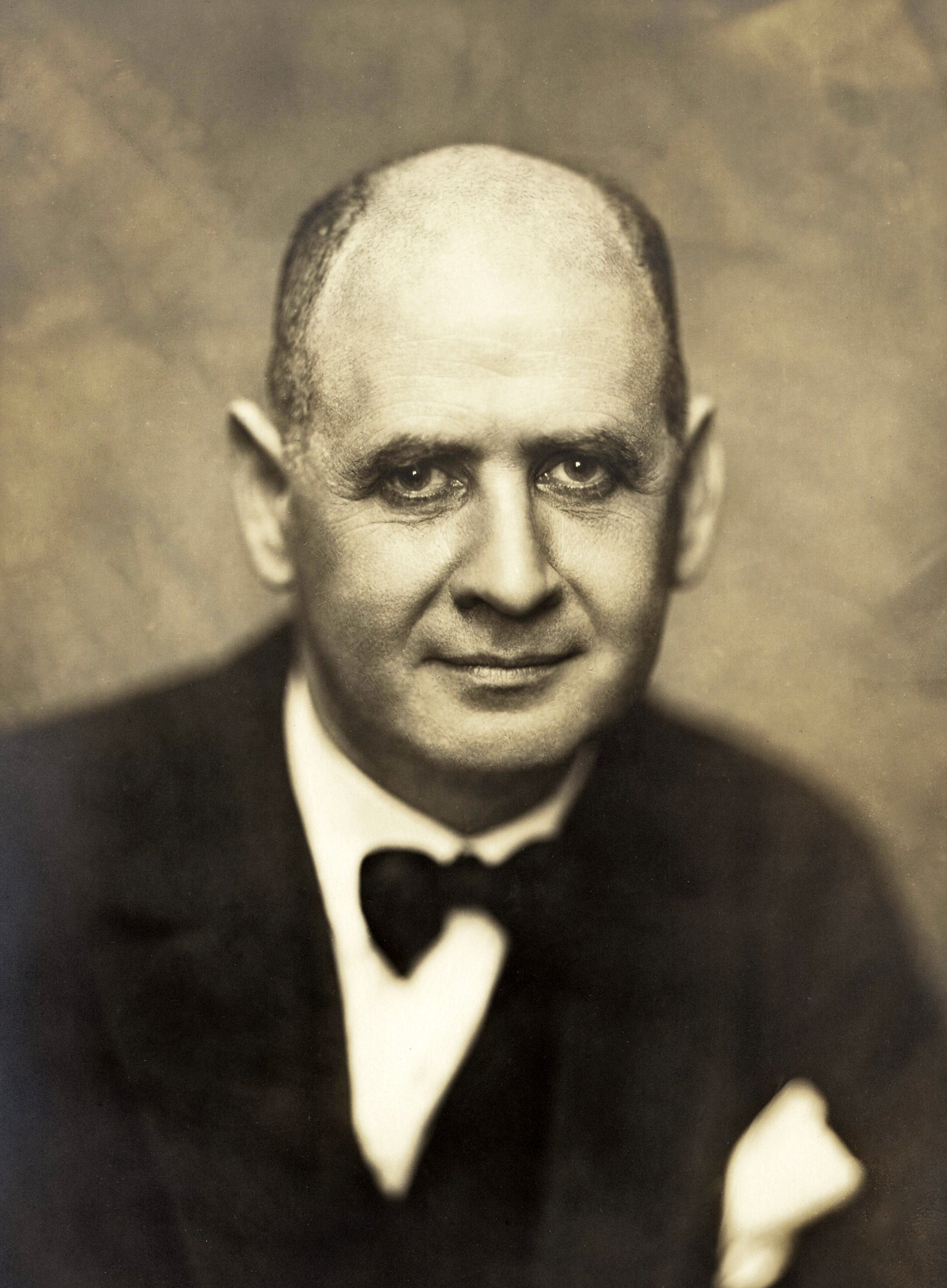
- Levi c. 1920s

Chairman of the Communist Party of Germany
- In office March 1919 – February 1921
- Serving with: Ernst Däumig (1920–1921)
- Preceded by: Leo Jogiches
- Succeeded by: Heinrich Brandler

Member of the Reichstag
- In office 24 June 1920 – 9 February 1930
- Preceded by: Constituency established
- Succeeded by: Georg Graupe
- Constituency: Reichswahlvorschlag (1920–1924); Chemnitz–Zwickau (1924–1930)

Personal details
- Born: 11 March 1883 Hechingen, Province of Hohenzollern, Kingdom of Prussia, German Empire
- Died: 9 February 1930 (aged 46) Berlin, Weimar Republic
- Party: SPD (1906–1916, after September 1922); USPD (1917–1918, March–September 1922); KPD (1918–1921); KAG (1921–March 1922)
- Other political affiliations: Spartacus League (1915–1918)

Military service
- Allegiance: German Empire
- Branch/service: Imperial German Army
- Years of service: 1915–1916
- Battles/wars: World War I; Western Front
- Central institution membership: 1920–1921: Full member, KPD Politburo; 1919–1921: Full member, KPD Zentrale

Paul Levi (German: [ˈleːvi]; 11 March 1883 – 9 February 1930) was a German communist and social democratic political leader. He was the head of the Communist Party of Germany following the assassination of Rosa Luxemburg and Karl Liebknecht in 1919. After being expelled for publicly criticising Communist Party tactics during the March Action, he formed the Communist Working Group (KAG / Kommunistische Arbeitsgemeinschaft) which in 1922 merged with the Independent Social Democratic Party. This party, in turn, merged with the Social Democratic Party a few months later and Levi became one of the leaders of its left wing.

== Biography ==
=== Early years ===
Paul Levi was born on 11 March 1883 in Hechingen in Hohenzollern Province to a well-to-do Jewish merchant family. He attended the Gymnasium in Stuttgart. Levi started work as a lawyer in Frankfurt in 1906 and also joined the Social Democratic Party of Germany (SPD) the same year. There he became part of the party's left wing together with Rosa Luxemburg and Karl Liebknecht. Beginning in 1913, Levi was also Luxemburg's lawyer in political cases. In 1914 he was elected as an SPD town councillor in Frankfurt.

Levi was one of the twelve delegates to the meeting in March 1915 which led to the formation of the Gruppe Internationale which became the Spartacist League. The following month he was conscripted to the army and sent to the Vosges. After starving himself, Levi was discharged on medical grounds in 1916, settling in Switzerland and associating with Karl Radek, Grigory Zinoviev and Vladimir Lenin, becoming a part of the bureau of the Zimmerwald Left and helping found La nouvelle internationale which he wrote for under the pseudonym 'Hartstein'. He was one of the signatories to a declaration approving of Lenin and other Russian revolutionaries actions in travelling through Germany in a sealed train.

Levi returned to Germany after the October Revolution and from March 1918 lived mostly in Berlin where he was one of the three editors of the Spartakusbriefe. At the founding conference of the Communist Party of Germany (KPD) on 30–31 December 1918, he introduced the discussion on 'The National Assembly'. Levi was amongst the majority on the KPD Zentrale who opposed the initiatives of Karl Liebknecht and Wilhelm Pieck who had supported a Revolutionary Committee with the Independent Social Democratic Party of Germany (USPD) and the Revolutionary Stewards to lead what became known as the Spartacist Uprising in January 1919.

=== Communist leader ===
After the killing of the KPD's main leaders Rosa Luxemburg, Karl Liebknecht, and Leo Jogiches, Levi took over as the central leader of the Communist Party. At the KPD's second congress in October 1919, Levi expelled the party's Council Communist ultra-left, around half the membership many of whom formed the Communist Workers' Party of Germany. During the Kapp Putsch Levi was in prison.

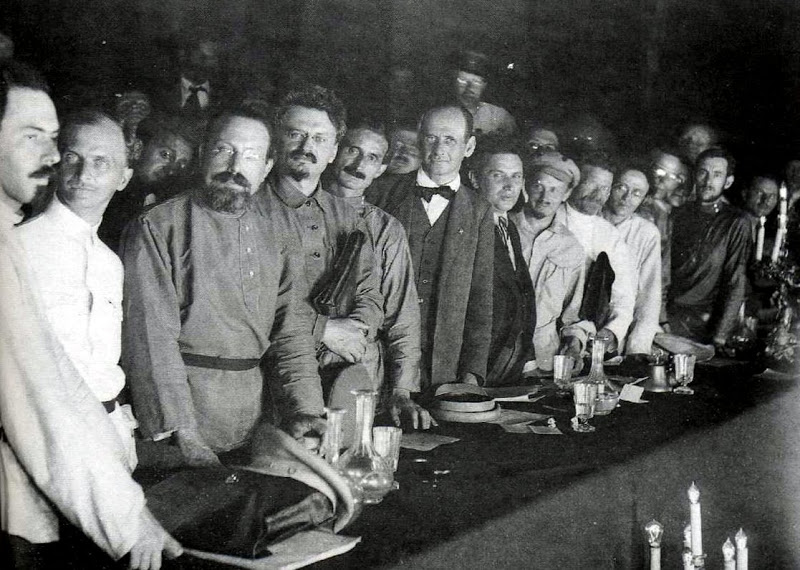
Delegates to the 2nd World Congress of the Comintern in Moscow, 1920. Left to right: Giacinto Serrati, Leon Trotsky, Alfred Rosmer, Paul Levi, Grigory Zinoviev, Nikolai Bukharin, Mikhail Kalinin, Karl Radek.

Levi headed the German delegation to the 2nd World Congress of the Communist International (Comintern) in Moscow in 1920, where he threatened that the KPD delegation would leave due to the presence of representatives of the KAPD.

He led the party away from the policy of immediate revolution, orientating it to wider layers of workers. These efforts were rewarded when a substantial section of the USPD joined the KPD after a debate at their Halle congress, making it a mass party for the first time with around 449,700 members. This was followed up by an 'Open Letter' which Levi, alongside Radek, convinced the KPD Zentrale to issue to other working class organisation to join in a joint struggle around their common interests, based on a successful initiative of Communists in Stuttgart.

Levi attended the 1921 Livorno Congress of the Italian Socialist Party (PSI) which had joined the Comintern, where Levi had supported Giacinto Serrati against the faction around Antonio Gramsci and Amadeo Bordiga who went on to form the Italian Communist Party (PCI) supported by Comintern representatives Mátyás Rákosi and Khristo Kabakchiev. Following a debate at the Zentrale over Italy where Levi and his supporters lost the vote by a small majority after being opposed by Radek and Rákosi, he resigned from the chairmanship of the Communist Party in early 1921, alongside his co-chairman Ernst Däumig and Clara Zetkin, Otto Brass and Adolph Hoffmann also resigned from the Central Committee. This had been preceded by the "small bureau" of the Comintern condemning the "Open Letter" and awarding the KAPD sympathising section status. Shortly after, under the influence of Béla Kun, the party launched the March Action of 1921.

As leader of the KPD, Levi frequently criticized "putschism," or the repeated efforts on behalf of Communists to take power without the broader support of the masses. He first observed this phenomenon in the failed revolutionary experiences in Bavaria and Hungary in 1919. Later on, after the disastrous March Action, Levi wrote his most famous pamphlet Unser Weg: Wider den Putschismus ("Our Path: Against Putschism"). In it, he laid out his criticisms of the Comintern, the KPD, and what he called the "Bakuninist" influence behind what he argued were numerous premature attempts to take state power. Levi cited both Engels and Marx on insurrection, showing how other Party members of the KPD had overlooked the careful preparatory work of the Bolsheviks leading up to the October 1917 Revolution. He simultaneously criticized Comintern representatives such as Béla Kun, Grigory Zinoviev and Karl Radek for their encouragement of these accelerationist policies both in Germany and Italy. Levi's criticism of the Comintern and "putschism" served as an early attempt to explain the failure of European Revolutions in the 1918-1923 period.

Following the failure of the uprisings Levi was expelled from the Communist Party for publicly criticizing party policies in his pamphlet Unser Weg. Lenin and Trotsky substantially agreed with his criticisms, but not the way in which he had made them. Lenin sent him a private letter through his friend Clara Zetkin, in which he asked Levi to accept the expulsion for "breach of discipline" and then adopt a friendly approach towards the KPD and cooperate with it in the class struggle in a loyal manner. If Levi would do so, Lenin would then push for his reinstatement in the party. Levi did not accept this proposal and continued to criticize the party sharply and condemn its leaders. This led Lenin to revise his previously still favourable attitude towards Levi.

=== Later life, death, and legacy ===
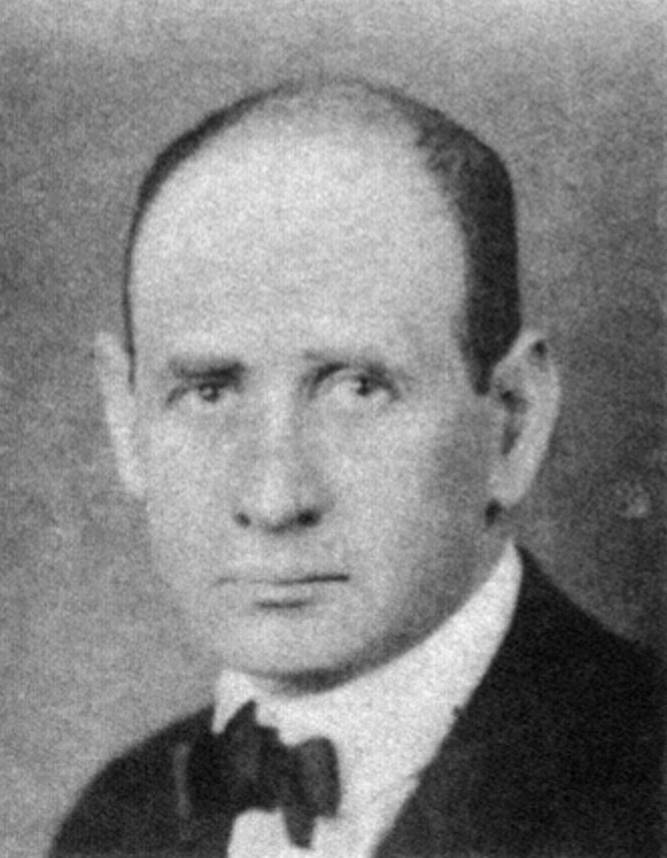
Levi's official Reichstag portrait, 1920

After being expelled from the Communist Party, Levi formed the Communist Working Group (KAG) with supporters expelled from the KPD at its Jena congress in September 1921, which included 13 of the KPD's Reichstag deputies (including Levi himself). In 1922 he joined the USPD, with whom he subsequently rejoined the SPD.

Levi began rethinking his previous policies and wrote introductions to Rosa Luxemburg's The Russian Revolution and Leon Trotsky's Lessons of October, which were sharply critical of the Bolsheviks. In the summer of 1921 Levi founded a monthly magazine named Unser Weg ("Our Way"), which he later replaced with a weekly Sozialistiche und politische Wochentliche (also known as Levi-Korrespondenz) when he rejoined the SPD.

Because of his Jewish roots, he became the target and symbol of a campaign in the press. He responded by attacking prominent Nazis, such as Adolf Hitler, Ernst Röhm, Alfred Rosenberg, and Wilhelm Frick in left-wing publications.

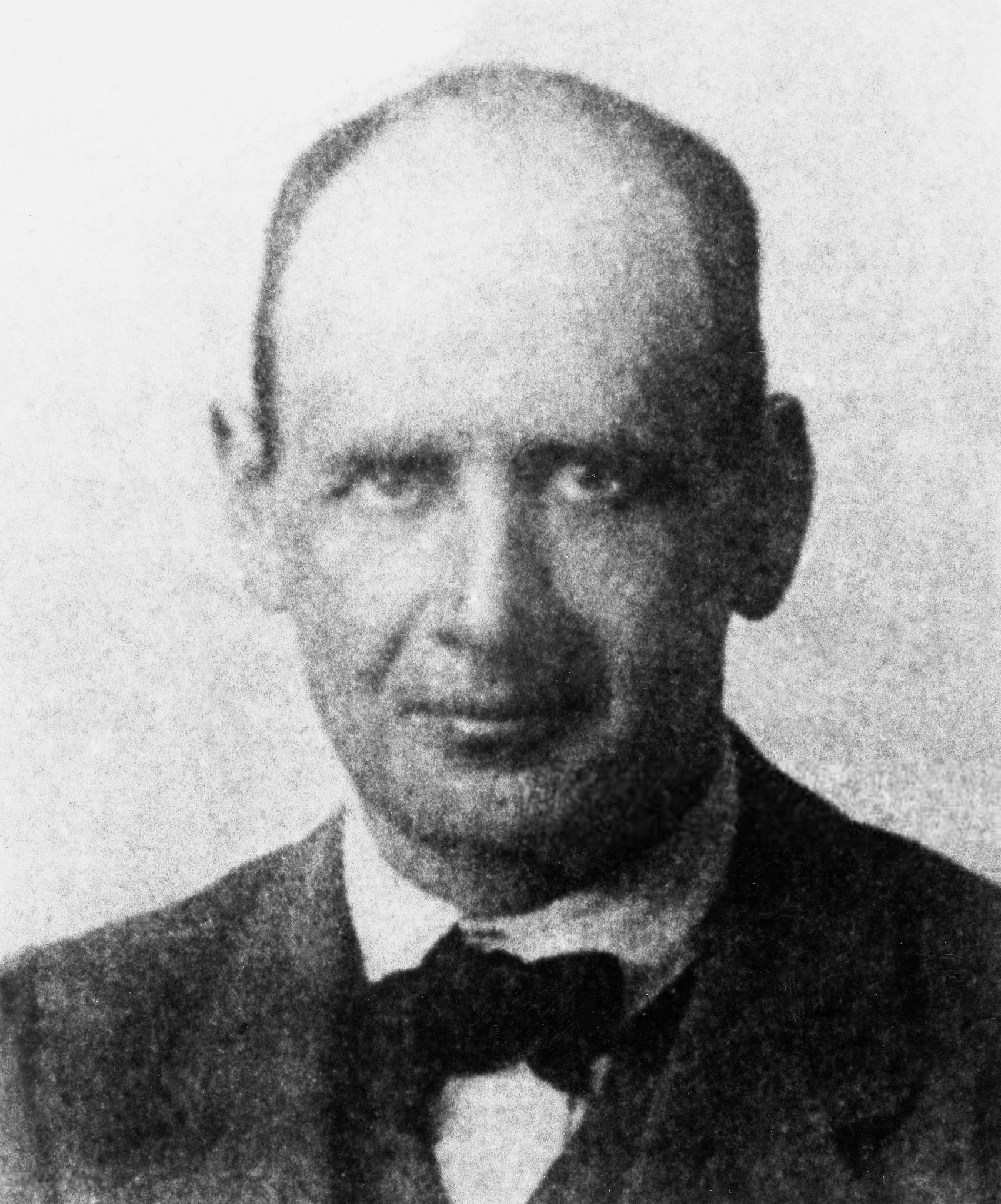
Levi's official Reichstag portrait, 1924

In 1924, Levi was re-elected to the Reichstag in Zwickau for the SPD, where he held meetings in remote village, conducted some legal cases and held education classes. Although his interventions were restricted in the Reichstag, he represented the SPD on the Reichstag's legal committee and spoke on issues of civil liberties. Levi also began to specialise in defending writers and newspapers that disclosed government secrets, but took up other civil liberties cases, including those of KPD members such as Willi Münzenberg.

Levi died on 9 February 1930 in Berlin after succumbing to injuries suffered when he fell from the window of his fifth floor attic flat. He had been taken to bed with pneumonia during a trial, where he had become feverish and delirious. Levi received numerous obituaries, including from Albert Einstein. However Lazitch & Drachkovitch relate: "He committed suicide in 1930 by jumping from a window at a clinic where he was being treated." After his death the Reichstag held a minute of commemoration during which the representatives of the Communist Party and the Nazi Party ostentatiously left the assembly hall. At his funeral, fellow dissident communist Valeriu Marcu presented the eulogy.

== Sources ==
- Grunwald, Henning (2012). Courtroom to Revolutionary Stage Performance and Ideology in Weimar Political Trials. Oxford, UK: Oxford University Press. ISBN 978-0-19-960904-8.
