= Independent Social Democratic Party of Germany =

Political party in Germany (1917–1922)

Independent Social Democratic Party of Germany Unabhängige Sozialdemokratische Partei Deutschlands
- Founded: 6 April 1917; 109 years ago
- Dissolved: 24 September 1922; 104 years ago (majority)
- Split from: SPD
- Preceded by: SAG
- Merged into: KPD (majority, 1920) (Note: A majority of the membership departed for the Communist KPD, but three-fourths of the USPD deputies rejected the KPD); SPD (faction, 1922) (Note: That section which did not merge with the Communist KPD); SAPD (minority, 1931) (Note: The small minority which rejected the September 1922 merger with the mainstream SPD)
- Newspaper: Die Freiheit
- Membership: 120,000 (January 1918); 750,000 (Spring 1920)
- Ideology: Centrist Marxism; Democratic socialism Pacifism
- Political position: Left-wing
- International affiliation: International Working Union of Socialist Parties
- Colors: Red

The Independent Social Democratic Party of Germany (German: Unabhängige Sozialdemokratische Partei Deutschlands, USPD) was a short-lived, left-wing political party in Germany during the late German Empire and early Weimar Republic. It was established in 1917 by members of the Social Democratic Party of Germany (SPD) who opposed Germany's involvement in World War I. After much of the USPD's membership joined the Communist Party of Germany (KPD) in 1920, the remainder returned to the SPD in 1922, with the exception of an insignificant faction that lasted until 1931.

The Social Democratic Party officially supported Germany's entry into World War I in 1914, but a small number of members centering around Karl Liebknecht repeatedly voted against government requests for war bonds. The leadership of the SPD began expelling the opponents of the war in 1916, and in April 1917 a group of those who had been ousted formed the USPD. The new party, which included the far-left Spartacus League, agitated actively against the war, supported anti-war strikes and welcomed the Russian Revolution.

When the German revolution broke out in 1918, the SPD quickly took control of the revolutionary movement. They invited an equal number of USPD members to join them on the ruling Council of the People's Deputies, but friction between the two parties led the USPD members to resign after less than two months. The primary point of contention was that the USPD favoured a council republic controlled by workers' and soldiers' councils, whereas the SPD wanted a socialist-led parliamentary republic. The USPD participated in the Weimar National Assembly, which wrote the constitution for the Weimar Republic, although it voted against accepting the final document.

After the radical Spartacus League split from the USPD in January 1919 to form the Communist Party of Germany, tensions remained within the party over the extent to which it wanted to continue to push for a council republic. In 1920, a little over half of the USPD membership joined the KPD. Two years later, almost all of the remaining USPD rejoined the SPD. A greatly shrunken USPD continued until 1931.

== Background ==
=== War bonds controversy ===
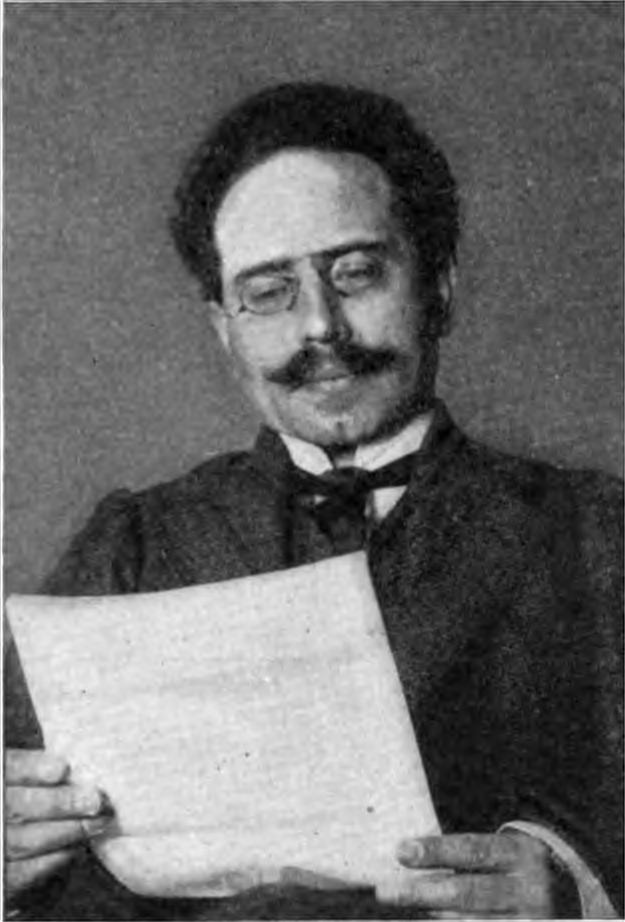
Karl Liebknecht in 1912. He cast the first vote in the imperial Reichstag against war funding.

On 3 August 1914, two days after the German Empire declared war on the Russian Empire and entered World War I, the Reichstag members of the Social Democratic Party (SPD) met to discuss the five billion marks in war bonds that Emperor Wilhelm II had requested to finance the war. Fourteen of the 110 members, including Karl Liebknecht and Hugo Haase, the party's leader, spoke against approving them. During the vote in the Reichstag on 4 August, however, they bowed to the party discipline of majority rule, and all SPD members voted in favour, making the Reichstag's vote unanimous. The SPD's approval brought it into the Reichstag's Burgfriedenspolitik, a political truce between the parliamentary parties in which they agreed not to criticise the government's handling of the war and to keep their disagreements out of public view. The German government had justified Germany's declaration of war as self-defence against Russian aggression, and in his speech to the Reichstag explaining the SPD's approval of the war bonds, Haase spoke of "every nation's right to national sovereignty and self-defence" in accordance with the Second International and stated that "in the hour of danger, we are not deserting the Fatherland".

In December 1914, when war bonds were voted on for the second time, Liebknecht was the only member of the Reichstag to vote against the authorisation. At the next vote in March 1915, SPD deputy Otto Rühle joined Liebknecht in voting no. Thirty other SPD members remained away from the chamber during the vote.

=== Beginnings of the split from the SPD ===
The signs of a split in the SPD began to become visible in 1915. While some on the far left resigned from the party, the members of the International Group, which Rosa Luxemburg and Karl Liebknecht had formed in August 1914, fought to change the party's course. An appeal by Liebknecht, published on 9 June 1915 and signed by over 1,000 party functionaries and members, argued that it had become clear that the German Empire was intent on a war of conquest and that the SPD leadership should renounce the Burgfrieden and embark on "the socialist struggle for peace".

Ten days later, Karl Kautsky, Hugo Haase and Eduard Bernstein, who had not supported Liebknecht's appeal, published a declaration in the Leipziger Volkszeitung entitled The Order of the Day (Das Gebot der Stunde). It condemned those in Germany who were calling for peace with annexations and demanded instead a negotiated peace. The document caused a considerable stir due to the prominence of the signatories. After Liebknecht's no vote in the Reichstag, it was perceived as a second major blow against the party executive's support of the parliamentary Burgfriedenspolitik.

=== Social Democratic Working Group ===
After 18 SPD members voted with Liebknecht and Rühle against additional war bonds in December 1915, the SPD parliamentary group and party executives began to take administrative action against those who opposed them. Liebknecht was expelled from the parliamentary group on 12 January 1916, Rühle resigned two days later in solidarity with Liebknecht, and the 18 other dissenters were expelled on 24 March. They subsequently formed the Social Democratic Working Group (Sozialdemokratische Arbeitsgemeinschaft, or SAG) but continued to regard themselves as members of the SPD. Liebknecht, who was stripped of his seat a few months later following his conviction for leading an anti-war demonstration, opted not to join the SAG.

=== Last unified party conference ===
The last SPD party conference with members from both the pro- and anti-war sides present took place in September 1916. Party leaders Friedrich Ebert and Philipp Scheidemann defended the SPD's support for the war, saying that a German defeat would be worse for workers than the survival of the capitalist system. Hugo Haase represented the anti-war bloc and Käte Duncker representing the Spartacus League (the renamed International Group), since Spartacus League members Karl Liebknecht and Rosa Luxemburg were then in jail. In the discussions that followed, no path to reconciliation between the factions could be found, and the conference ended in failure.

On 18 January 1917, Ebert had the members of the SAG and Spartacus League expelled from the party.

== Party history ==
=== Founding ===
The Independent Social Democratic Party of Germany (USPD) was founded at the second national conference of the opposition organised by the SAG from 6 to 8 April 1917 in Gotha, the city of the historic socialist Unification Congress of 1875. 124 delegates from 91 Social Democratic constituencies and 15 members of the Reichstag took part in the founding meeting. Hugo Haase and Georg Ledebour were elected chairmen, and Wilhelm Dittmann became executive secretary. Members elected to the Central Committee also included Luise Zietz, and Adolf Hofer. The USPD as a whole was heterogeneous and marked by sometimes openly opposing viewpoints. It brought together social democratic traditionalists such as Haase, revisionist opponents of the war such as Kurt Eisner and Eduard Bernstein, leading theorists such as Karl Kautsky and the Marxist revolutionaries of the Spartacus group.

From its inception, the small but active Spartacus Group had rejected the SPD's participation in the Burgfrieden and adhered to the party's positions from the pre-war period. The group published its own illegal periodical, Spartakusbriefe (Spartacus Letters), as well as a steady stream of pamphlets and leaflets. It joined the USPD as a united bloc on the condition of complete political independence. The Spartacus Group consisted of around 2,000 activists in 1917 but was far more influential than its relatively small membership would suggest. Although it had decided to join the party in the face of resistance from within its own ranks, its agitation often ignored the USPD's official line and instead subjected it to constant criticism.

In spite of the varied ideological makeup of the party, the USPD's leadership initially consisted almost exclusively of members of its traditionalist-centrist faction. It saw the USPD primarily as a re-founding of the "old SPD" and accordingly proclaimed in its appeal of 13 April 1917 that "the old social democracy has been reborn in Gotha". In keeping with the sentiment, the Prussian state parliament members who had defected to the USPD referred to themselves as the Social Democratic Parliamentary Group (Old Direction). Rosa Luxemburg criticised its policies as "tragicomic shadow boxing" and accused the party leadership of not addressing "the political roots of bureaucracy and the complete degeneration of democracy in the old party".

The core SPD that supported the war changed its name to the Majority Social Democratic Party of Germany (MSPD, although still generally referred to as the SPD), with Friedrich Ebert as party chairman. A few months after its founding, the USPD had about 120,000 members, while in March 1917 the MSPD had 243,000. The MSPD districts of Greater Berlin, Halle/Saale, Erfurt, Leipzig, Brunswick and Frankfurt am Main, with a total of 36 constituency organisations, had almost completely converted to the USPD, as had important individual constituency organisations such as Königsberg, Solingen, Essen, Düsseldorf, Gotha and Bremen. In the Leipzig district, the region that was the original core of social democracy, the MSPD had fewer than 100 members immediately after the split, while the USPD had over 30,000. In Greater Berlin, there were 28,000 USPD members compared to 6,475 in the MSPD. In the first months of its existence, the USPD's growth came in spite of the repressive actions of the military authorities, who had been instructed to deprive the party of the "opportunity to spread its views among the people". Censorship, bans prohibiting party leaders from speaking, bans on assemblies and newspapers and the targeted conscription of leading functionaries placed the party "in a kind of semi-legality" in many places.

=== World War I ===
The MSPD's leadership was forced to make a number of policy changes due to the February Revolution in Russia and the almost simultaneous establishment of the USPD. The Petrograd Soviet's demand for "peace without annexations and reparations" found broad support in all parts of the German labour movement. On 19 April 1917, the MSPD party committee backed the statement in a resolution, and at the end of June it urged party leadership to demand that the Reich government clearly state its war aims.

On 19 July 1917, the MSPD joined the Centre Party and Progressive People's Party to pass the Reichstag Peace Resolution. It called for a negotiated peace treaty to end the war and no annexations. The USPD parliamentary group said that the text was ambiguous and a transparent show of domestic and foreign policy tactics. They joined the conservatives and National Liberals in voting against it. The following day, the Reichstag approved a new war bond bill against the votes of the USPD.

In mid-April 1917, hundreds of thousands of workers took part in strikes that broke out in several centres of the arms industry such as Berlin, Leipzig and Magdeburg, all of which were USPD strongholds. The main reason for the strikes was the government's reduction of bread rations on 1 April, although the strikers also had political demands including ending the war, censorship and the mobilisation of workers.

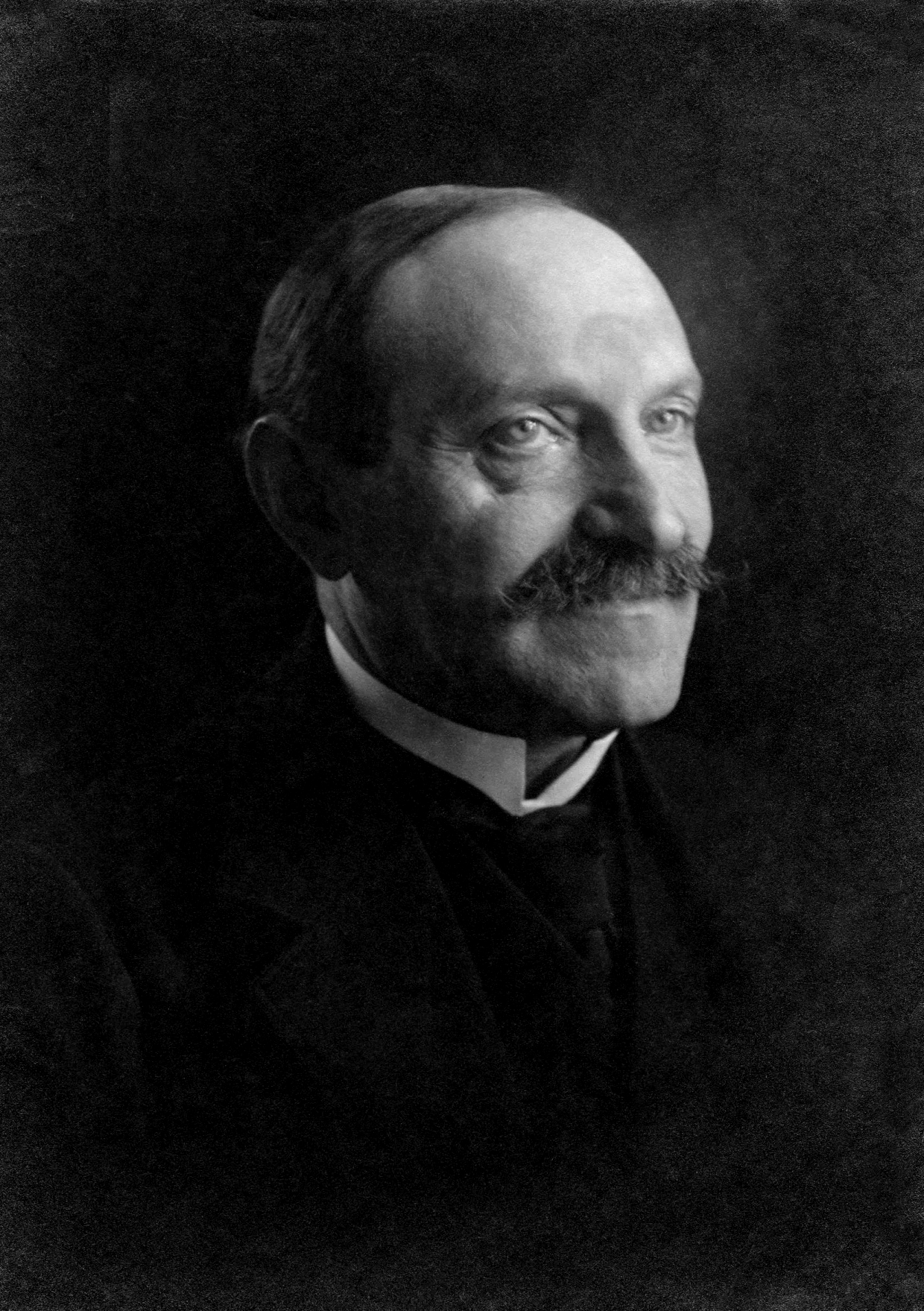
Hugo Haase, one of the first chairmen of the USPD, c. 1916

Numerous strikers were drafted into the military after the actions ended, many of them to the High Seas Fleet. The presence of the highly politicised new arrivals contributed significantly to the radicalisation of the ships' crews, which had been recruited largely from the skilled workforces of the major cities. Many of the men sympathised with the USPD and had long been complaining about poor rations and harassment by officers. An illegal organisation of some 5,000 men grew up beginning in June 1917. In early August, when the group's leaders were preparing a general strike within the fleet, their plans were exposed by informers. The naval judiciary handed down over 50 prison sentences and five death sentences, two of which – against Albin Köbis and Max Reichpietsch – were carried out. The investigations revealed that Köbis, Reichpietsch and Willy Sachse had met several times with top USPD officials including Wilhelm Dittmann, Luise Zietz and Adolph Hoffmann. They had advised the sailors against illegal actions and, above all, against recruiting members for the USPD. Reichpietsch, the head of the organisation, nevertheless regarded his activities as party work and considered himself a member of the USPD. Because the sailors' connections to the USPD were deemed a "threat to the state", Reich Chancellor Georg Michaelis and State Secretary of the Navy Eduard von Capelle attacked the USPD in the Reichstag on 9 October and indirectly threatened to ban the party. Haase and Dittmann sharply criticised the death sentences but also successfully proved that the party leadership had at no point crossed the line of legality.

The October Revolution in Russia was welcomed by the majority of the USPD. Immediately after news of the events broke, the party leadership sent a telegram conveying "warmest congratulations to the Russian proletariat for seizing political power". Numerous local organisations expressed similar sentiments.

The aggressive demands of the German delegation at the Brest-Litovsk peace negotiations with Russia sparked intense bitterness within the labour movement and spurred it to take action. The largest political strike in Germany up to that point began on 28 January 1918. It involved over a million people and spread across much of Germany. Its demands included peace without annexations or indemnities, worker representation in peace negotiations, ending military control of factories, freeing political prisoners and democratisation of the German state. In Berlin the strike was led by an eleven-member action committee, almost all of whom belonged to the USPD. They co-opted three members of the USPD executive (Haase, Ledebour and Dittmann) and also called on the MSPD to send three representatives. Following the intervention of the military and the imposition of a stricter state of siege, the action committee called off the strike on 4 February. In Berlin alone, some 50,000 strikers were immediately conscripted, and courts-martial handed down prison sentences, some of them severe, against around 200 who were considered ringleaders. The January strike, despite having achieved none of its ends, led to a consolidation of the USPD's dominance over the MSPD in Berlin.

In early October 1918, when it had become clear that Germany would lose the war, the MSPD entered the cabinet of Max von Baden, the last chancellor of the German Empire. The USPD sharply criticised the MSPD's move:

The Social Democratic Party has been called upon to join the government in order to protect bourgeois society following the collapse of imperialism. It has taken on the task of organising "national defence" and protecting bourgeois "order". It has abandoned the demand of the international congresses that the catastrophe of the World War be exploited by social democracy to replace the capitalist system with the socialist one.

=== November Revolution ===
==== Decision to join the government ====
When the initial phase of the German revolution broke out among sailors in Kiel in late October 1918, the USPD leadership was caught off guard and, unlike the MSPD, was unprepared to guide the course of events. It was not until the evening of 8 November that the USPD joined the Spartacus League in spreading leaflets calling for a general strike, mass demonstrations in the city centre and the formation of workers' and soldiers' councils. On the morning of 9 November, hundreds of thousands of people heeded the call and poured into central Berlin. Armed workers and soldiers on their own volition occupied railway stations, bridges and key public buildings. The leading USPD members, who had gathered at the Reichstag building, had no strategy for dealing with the situation. They were taken by surprise when a delegation from the MSPD consisting of Ebert, Philipp Scheidemann and Eduard David presented them with an offer to take over the government together.

A few hours later, Chancellor Max von Baden appointed Ebert to succeed him as chancellor. Ebert was aware that he could not form a functional government without the USPD. That evening, the MSPD negotiators presented the USPD representatives with the choice of either having the MSPD take over the government by itself or the USPD cooperating with it on an equal footing. The USPD responded with several conditions for its participation, including that Germany become a socialist republic and that all power be in the hands of the workers' and soldiers' councils. The MSPD executive committee rejected the conditions out of hand. Under Hugo Haase's guidance, an agreement with the MSPD was reached in the early afternoon of 10 November. The USPD's new conditions simply demanded a role for the workers' and soldiers' councils in the new government and no longer ruled out a constituent national assembly to determine Germany's future form of government.

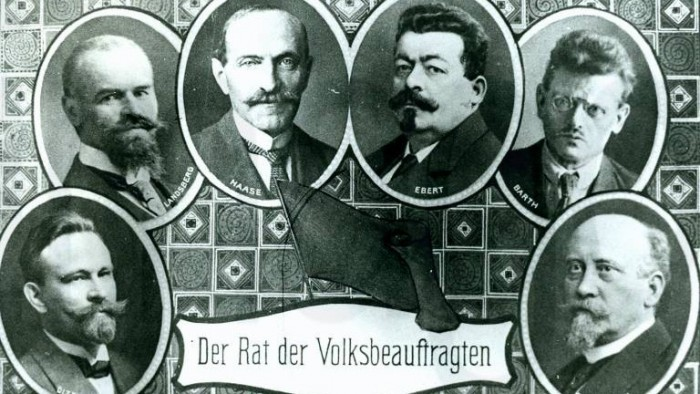
The Council of the People's Deputies. From left to right: Wilhelm Dittman (USPD), Otto Landsberg (MSPD), Hugo Haase (USPD), Friedrich Ebert (MSPD), Emil Barth (USPD) and Philipp Scheidemann (MSPD)

The agreement between the USPD and MSPD executive committees frustrated the plans of the Revolutionary Stewards and Spartacus Group to establish a radical left-wing government at the general assembly of the workers' and soldiers' councils when it convened on the evening of 10 November at the Circus Busch auditorium in Berlin. The formation of a joint government of the two workers' parties, presented under the slogans "Socialist unity" and "No fratricidal struggle", confronted the Circus Busch assembly with what amounted to a fait accompli. Haase and Ebert campaigned for a socialist government divided evenly between the MSPD and USPD, and the delegates approved it by a large majority under the name Council of the People's Deputies. Its six members were Friedrich Ebert, Philipp Scheidemann and Otto Landsberg for the MSPD and Hugo Haase, Wilhelm Dittmann and Emil Barth for the USPD.

The fundamental differences within the USPD that led to the first party split just a few weeks later were revealed in a speech made by Karl Liebknecht, when in reference to the MSPD members on the council, he exclaimed that "the counter-revolution ... is already on the march ... already in action ... already here amongst us". The party members who were pushing for the revolution to be driven yet further found it a "grotesque situation" that the USPD had abruptly begun to cooperate with the MSPD, whose leadership had initially opposed the revolutionary movement and then placed itself at its head.

==== In government ====
The three MSPD members on the Council of the People's Deputies were for the most part accepted by the government's civil servants and state secretaries (equivalent to ministers), most of whom had remained in their positions during the revolution. The USPD representatives, on the other hand, were often ignored and at times demonstratively sidelined. Foreign Office state secretary Wilhelm Solf, for example, refused even to greet Hugo Haase, who had formally assumed responsibility for foreign policy on the council. The highly selective cooperation on the part of the old imperial administration enabled Ebert to "reduce the participation of the three USPD members in the Council of the People's Deputies to near insignificance". A number of matters were decided without consulting the USPD representatives and came to their attention only late or not at all. That applied in particular to Ebert's ongoing consultations with the Supreme Army Command and Prussian War Ministry. According to General Wilhelm Groener's sworn statement of 1925, the purpose of their talks was "the complete suppression of the revolution, the restoration of an orderly government, the support of that government through military force, and the earliest possible convening of a national assembly". Such goals were incompatible with the USPD's stated programs and, had they become known, would have made the resignation of its representatives on the council inevitable.

On 12 November 1918, the Council of the People's Deputies published an outline of the government's goals. Although it stated that it would "implement a socialist programme", it focused on lifting wartime restrictions. The MSPD and USPD differed above all on whether the new government should move forward at once to take such steps as the nationalisation of large estates and certain key industries, or if it should instead leave the decisions to a national assembly. The 12 November programme nevertheless stated that a constituent national assembly would be elected, with details to follow. While both the Spartacus League and other influential USPD leftists such as Richard Müller and Ernst Däumig criticised the "cry for a national assembly" as a "path to bourgeois rule" and a "rallying cry of all counter-revolutionary capitalist circles", Haase, Dittmann and Barth, despite their ongoing public commitment to the workers' and soldiers' councils, were discussing only when the election should be held. They sought to push it out as far as possible, after the withdrawal and demobilisation of the frontline troops had been completed and the balance of power created by the revolution consolidated. The MSPD representatives – together with large sections of the press and all the middle-class parties – wanted the elections to be held in January or February 1919. Following at times fierce debates, they succeeded in getting their way in the Council of the People's Deputies. On 30 November it issued the Decree on Elections to the German Constituent National Assembly, setting a date in February (later moved to 19 January).

The Christmas crisis of 1918 brought an end to the cooperation between the USPD and MSPD. At Ebert's request, regular German army units were brought to Berlin to fight members of the socialist revolutionary Volksmarinedivision in a dispute over the division's size and wages. The MSPD's use of government troops against a group that had supported the revolution led the USPD members on the Council of the People's Deputies to resign on 29 December. They were replaced by two MSPD members, Rudolf Wissell and Gustav Noske.

==== Split of the Spartacus League ====
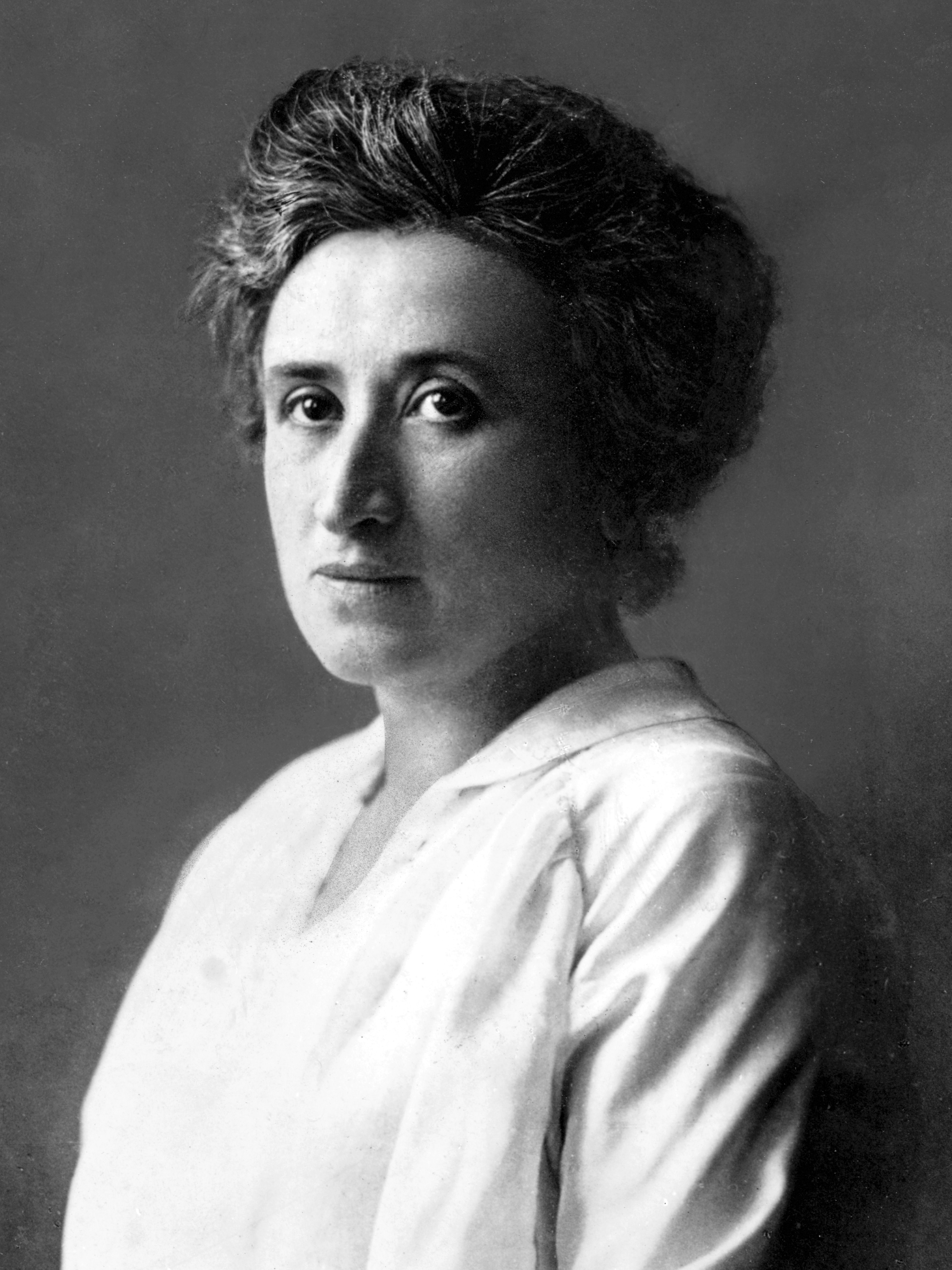
Rosa Luxemburg circa 1911. She was a member of the Spartacus League within the USPD before leaving to co-found the Communist Party of Germany with Karl Liebknecht.

On 1 January 1919, the Spartacus League officially split from the USPD and joined with the International Communists of Germany (IKPD) to form the Communist Party of Germany (KPD) under the leadership of Karl Liebknecht and Rosa Luxemburg. At the time, the Spartacus League had only about 100 members in Berlin and two to three thousand overall. The KPD claimed about 10,000 members at its founding, compared to the USPD's 120,000 in the spring of 1918.

In early January 1919, the minister president of Prussia, Paul Hirsch (MSPD), sparked the Spartacist uprising when he removed Berlin's chief of police, Emil Eichhorn (USPD), for supporting the Volksmarinedivision during the Christmas crisis. The leadership of the USPD, the Revolutionary Stewards and the KPD called a mass demonstration in support of Eichhorn for 5 January. An estimated 100,000 people filled the streets of Berlin and, acting on their own, occupied the printing plants of several newspapers and publishing houses, a printing plant and a telegraph office. Buoyed by the workers' actions, Georg Ledebour of the USPD and Karl Liebknecht declared the Council of the People's Deputies ousted and announced that they had taken control of the government. Gustav Noske then brought in government troops to put down the uprising. By the time the fighting ended on 12 January, the death toll stood at 165. In the aftermath of the revolutionaries' defeat, Rosa Luxemburg and Karl Liebknecht were murdered by Freikorps troops under government orders.

=== Founding phase of the Weimar Republic ===
The election to the Weimar National Assembly held on 19 January 1919 was a major disappointment to the USPD. It secured only 7.6% of the vote, whereas the MSPD received just under 38%. The middle-class parties together attracted 16.5 million voters compared to the 13.8 million who chose the MSPD or USPD. The "socialist majority", which Karl Kautsky's group had declared "absolutely certain", proved to be illusory. By the election date, it was no longer clear to many voters what distinguished the USPD from the Majority Social Democrats. Just a few weeks before the election, it had been cooperating with the MSPD and had portrayed the National Assembly as a necessary step towards socialism. It was not until February that the USPD began to attack the Ebert government as "bourgeois".

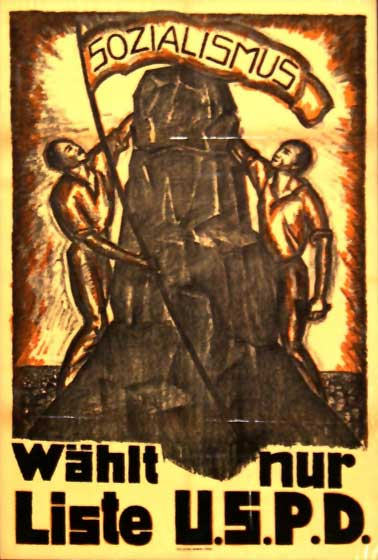
A 1919 USPD campaign poster reading "Vote only for the USPD list"

The January election marked a clear turning point for the USPD. The leadership position of Haase's circle, which had until then been virtually unchallenged, began to erode as it became apparent just how little the party had achieved since the outbreak of the revolution. An explicitly socialist-revolutionary faction, focused on the councils and led by Ernst Däumig, rapidly gained influence within the party. The fact that the USPD had fallen so far behind in the election was due not only to political factors but also to organisational shortcomings. Up to that point, it had remained a purely metropolitan party with little or no presence in smaller towns and rural areas. Only after the electoral defeat did the party leadership recognise the need to establish a nationwide organisation.

The USPD parliamentary group was politically isolated in the Weimar National Assembly. Haase had decided from the outset to reject any offer to join the government and was prepared to adopt an opposition course. With the intention of "proving the USPD wrong", Ebert made a coalition offer to the USPD. The USPD's rejection was received on 6 February:

For the USPD parliamentary group, joining the government is out of the question until the current tyranny has been eliminated and all members of the government not only make a commitment but also demonstrate the resolute will to safeguard the democratic and socialist achievements of the revolution against the bourgeoisie and the military autocracy.

When the "emergency constitution" – the Law on Provisional Reich Authority – was debated on 10 February, Oskar Cohn of the USPD pointed out that neither "revolution" nor "republic" appeared in the draft rejected by the USPD. The USPD's proposed amendments – changing the name of the state from German Reich to German Republic, replacing the Reich president with a multi-member presidium and holding referendums on laws in the event of a veto by a yet-to-be-established central body of workers' and soldiers' councils – were all voted down, generally without discussion. On 27 February, only the USPD deputies voted against the Act on the Formation of a Provisional Reichswehr, on the basis of which several Freikorps units were converted into Reichswehr brigades and the soldiers' councils abolished.

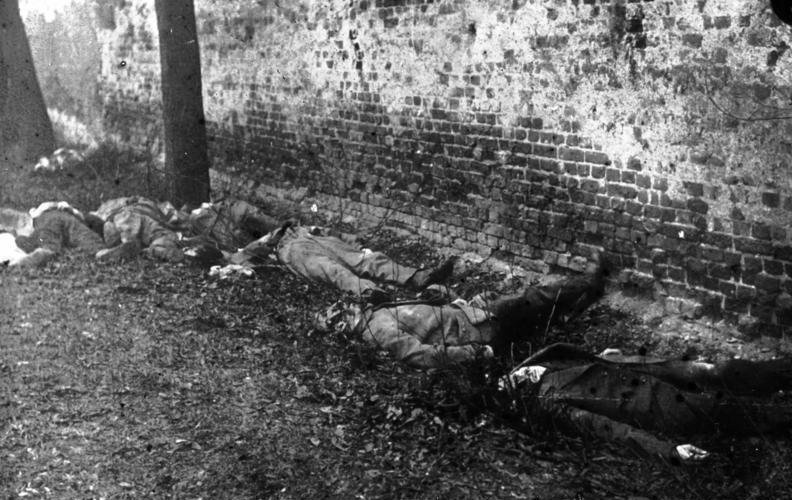
Revolutionaries summarily executed by government troops in the Berlin March Battles. The violence grew out of a strike sponsored in part by the USPD.

The USPD held a party conference from 2 to 6 March 1919. It fell during the height of the Berlin March Battles, a general strike by Berlin workers who wanted to implement the revolution's major radical-left demands, including the socialisation of key industries, the legal safeguarding of workers' and soldiers' councils and the democratisation of the military. The strike, which government and Freikorps violently suppressed with as many as 3,000 killed, was supported by the USPD, KPD and, more reluctantly, the MSPD. In the face of criticisms at the conference of the USPD's past failures, Hugo Haase emphasised that nothing had been lost and that the revolution was not over. After he expressly ruled out a reunification with the MSPD, the party congress decided that dual membership would no longer be tolerated. Eduard Bernstein, the revisionist Marxist theoretician who had rejoined the MSPD in December 1918, subsequently resigned from the USPD. Clara Zetkin used the party congress to announce her move to the KPD. She was prompted by Kautsky's statement that he "considered the question of the mode of production [less urgent than] ... that of production itself". In the debate about the council system, the party leadership succeeded in including a statement in the declaration adopted by the party congress that the USPD sought the "integration of the council system into the constitution" that was being developed by the Weimar National Assembly.

Following the announcement of the peace terms in the Treaty of Versailles on 7 May 1919, the USPD leadership immediately and unanimously advocated signing the treaty. It did not deny the harshness of the terms and sought to counter the nationalist campaigns that were gaining momentum. The party was able to organise mass rallies in favour of signing the treaty, as on 13 May, when there were 40 in the Berlin area alone.

During the debates on the draft constitution in the National Assembly, the USPD parliamentary group advocated the abolition of the individual states and called for guarantees of fundamental rights and for democratic participation to be extended to the greatest possible extent. Its spokespeople made repeated efforts to highlight the potential for dictatorship inherent in Article 48, which allowed the Reich president under certain circumstances to take emergency measures without the prior consent of the Reichstag. In the final vote on the constitution on 31 July 1919, no USPD member voted in favour. On 5 August 1919, the party newspaper Die Freiheit (Freedom) described the new constitution as "the perpetuation of the shame of the right-wing socialist party".

=== Shift to the left ===
On 7 November 1919, Hugo Haase died from wounds he had received in an assassination attempt on 8 October. The perpetrator, an Austrian labourer, was immediately portrayed by the judicial authorities as a "monomaniac" and "idiot" who was acting alone. No investigation was carried out into the possible existence of instigators, and the attack was never fully resolved.

At a party conference in Leipzig that began in late November 1919, an action programme championed by Arthur Crispien which advocated the "smashing" of the bourgeois state and its replacement by "political workers' councils as the governing organisation of the proletariat" was adopted unanimously. It went far beyond the programmatic declarations of March, which had advocated a rather vague "integration" of the councils into the bourgeois state. It reflected the growing influence of revolutionary-Marxist concepts and the parallel discrediting of Karl Kautsky's positions. The fact that the USPD leadership went to great lengths to accommodate the party's left wing on the question of the programme was, in all likelihood, what ultimately ensured that the party did not break apart as early as the end of 1919.

Ernst Däumig was elected party chairman along with Crispien. It had far-reaching consequences for the further development of the USPD that, despite its numerical superiority at the party congress, the party's left wing remained underrepresented on the newly elected executive committee, with only nine of the 26 executive members. The Leipzig party congress was nevertheless perceived by the public as a drastic shift to the left by the USPD.

=== Political violence ===
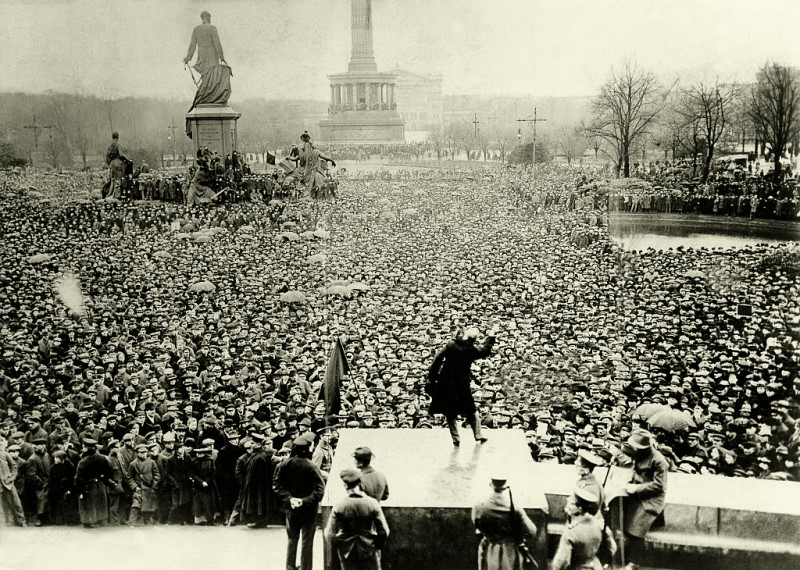
The crowd in front of the Reichstag building on the day of the Reichstag Bloodbath.

The USPD and KPD called for a protest on 13 January 1920 at the Reichstag building, where the National Assembly was then meeting. The delegates were discussing a works council law, which the USPD thought was being weakened too much. The radical left of the USPD wanted to use the demonstration to show that the needs of the proletariat could not be met through parliamentary means. Some in the crowd, which was estimated at about 100,000, forced their way into the building, and when members of the Berlin security police attempted to keep them back with fixed bayonets, shots were fired from among the protestors. The police then fired into the crowd without warning. The death toll in what came to be known as the Reichstag Bloodbath was set at 42.

In March 1920, right-wing nationalists with the support of Freikorps troops attempted to overthrow the MSPD-led national government in the Kapp Putsch. Most of the cabinet fled Berlin and called for a general strike in opposition to the putschists. The USPD supported the strike along with the unions and the other parties of the centre and left, although their goals differed markedly. The MSPD and centrist parties wanted to restore the government, but the USPD sought to replace it with a fully socialist regime. The strike all but shut Berlin down when twelve million workers walked off the job nationwide, and the putsch collapsed within five days. Opposition to the putsch in the industrial Ruhr region, however, continued and became the Ruhr uprising. Across the area, spontaneously formed executive councils (Vollzugsräte) took power after disarming the local Security Police and Reichswehr forces. The councils were dominated mostly by the KPD and USPD, with only limited participation by the MSPD. The councils used local workers' defence (Arbeiterwehr) units during armed action. At its peak, the Ruhr Red Army is estimated to have had 50,000 to 80,000 members. Among those in it who belonged to political parties, 60% were KPD, 30% USPD and 10% MSPD. The uprising was put down by regular and Freikorps troops, with an estimated 1,000 workers and about 600 Reichswehr and Freikorps soldiers killed.

In the Reichstag elections of 6 June 1920, the number of votes cast for the MSPD and German Democratic Party (DDP) fell by more than half compared to the January 1919 elections. The USPD picked up most of the votes lost to the MSPD and rose from 7.6% to 17.6% of the vote and from 22 to 83 seats. It became the second strongest party in the Reichstag behind the MSPD.

=== Party split ===
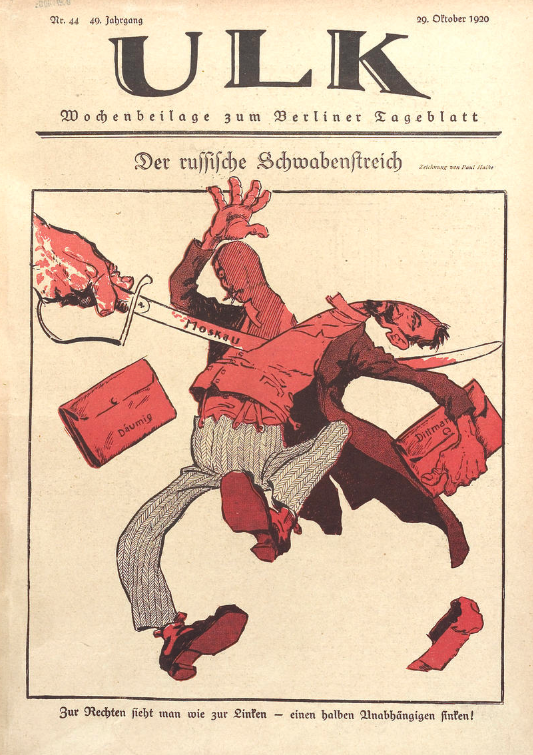
Cover of the satirical magazine Ulk from 29 October 1920 depicting the split in the USPD. The title translates to "The Russian Swabian Prank". The sword has "Moscow" on it, cutting Däumig on the left from Dittmann on the right. The line below the picture reads "On the right, just as on the left, you can see a half-independent figure sinking."

In July and August 1920, four delegates from the USPD (Ernst Däumig, Arthur Crispien, Walter Stoecker and Wilhelm Dittmann) attended the 2nd World Congress of the Communist International to discuss participating in the Comintern. While Däumig and Stoecker agreed with the International's 21 conditions for entry, Crispien and Dittmann opposed them. In the debate over joining the Comintern that subsequently broke out in the USPD, many members felt that the requirements for joining would lead to a loss of the party's independence and perceived them as a dictate from Moscow. Others, especially younger members such as Ernst Thälmann, argued that Comintern membership would help the party implement its socialist ideals.

The proposal to join the Comintern was approved at a party convention in Halle in October 1920 by 236 votes to 156. The USPD split in the process, with both the Left USPD under Ernst Däumig and Adolph Hoffmann and the Right USPD under Georg Ledebour and Arthur Crispien seeing themselves as the rightful USPD. On 4 December 1920, the Left USPD with about 400,000 members merged into the KPD, forming the United Communist Party of Germany (Vereinigte Kommunistische Partei Deutschlands, VKPD) while the Right USPD, with about 340,000 members and three-fourths of its Reichstag deputies, continued under the name USPD. They supported parliamentary democracy against the Communists' revolutionary aspirations. They were instrumental in the creation of the International Working Union of Socialist Parties in 1921.

=== Return to the MSPD ===
Initially, a majority of the remaining USPD members rejected any rapprochement with the MSPD. They distanced themselves from both "left-wing putschism" and "right-wing opportunism". Over the following two years, however, a number of factors came together to bring about the reunification of the USPD with the MSPD. For one, the significantly reduced size of the party and its limited funds left the USPD with much less political influence than it had had before. Party leadership saw less and less hope for success in their attempt to find a "special path" between the KPD and MSPD, and the USPD's ideological stance became increasingly like that of the MSPD. The assassination of Foreign Minister Walther Rathenau on 24 June 1922 by members of the ultra-nationalist Organisation Consul brought home to the two parties the danger to the Weimar Republic that was coming from the far right. They formed a single parliamentary group in the Reichstag on 14 July 1922 and on 24 September formalised their reunification at a joint congress in Nuremberg. They initially adopted the name United Social Democratic Party of Germany (Vereinigte Sozialdemokratische Partei Deutschlands, VSPD), but it was shortened to SPD in 1924.

A minority faction led by Georg Ledebour and Theodor Liebknecht refused reunification and reorganised a much reduced party under the USPD name. In the 1928 Reichstag election, the continuity party won 0.06% of the vote, falling far short of winning any seats. The party contested the 1930 election with even less success before merging into the Socialist Workers' Party of Germany (Sozialistische Arbeiterpartei Deutschland, SAPD) in 1931.

== Reichstag electoral results ==
Year	Leader	Votes	%	Seats	+/–
1919	Hugo Haase	2,317,290 (5th)	7.62	22 / 423	New
1920	Arthur Crispien	5,046,813 (2nd)	17.90	84 / 459	▲62
Majority of USPD joins the KPD after the 1920 election, Remainder reunifies with the SPD (24 September 1922)
May 1924	Georg Ledebour; Theodor Liebknecht	235,145 (13th)	0.79	0 / 472	▼84
December 1924	Georg Ledebour; Theodor Liebknecht	98,842 (14th)	0.32	0 / 493	Steady
1928	Georg Ledebour; Theodor Liebknecht	20,815 (25th)	0.06	0 / 491	Steady
1930	Georg Ledebour; Theodor Liebknecht	11,690 (22nd)	0.03	0 / 577	Steady

== Leaders ==
- Apr. 1917 – Jan. 1919: Hugo Haase and Georg Ledebour (resigned)
- Jan. – Mar. 1919: Hugo Haase
- Mar. – Nov. 1919: Hugo Haase† (assassinated) and Arthur Crispien
- Nov. 1919: Arthur Crispien
- Dec. 1919 – Oct. 1920: Arthur Crispien and Ernst Däumig
- Oct. – Dec. 1920: (Left USPD) Ernst Däumig and Adolph Hoffmann
- Oct. 1920 – Jan. 1922: (Right USPD) Arthur Crispien and Georg Ledebour
- Jan. 1922 – Sep. 1922: Arthur Crispien, Georg Ledebour and Wilhelm Dittmann
