= Rosi Wolfstein =

Rosi Wolfstein-Frölich
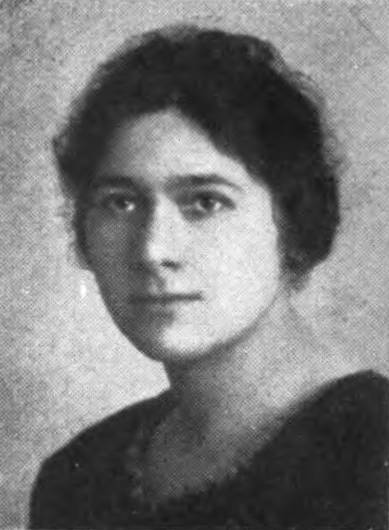
- Wolfstein c. 1921

Member of the Landtag of Prussia for Merseburg
- In office 10 March 1921 – 5 January 1925
- Preceded by: Multi-member district
- Succeeded by: Multi-member district

Personal details
- Born: Alma Rosalie Wolfstein; 27 May 1888 Witten, Province of Westphalia, Kingdom of Prussia, German Empire
- Died: 11 December 1987 (aged 99) Frankfurt, West Germany
- Party: SPD (1908–1917, after 1951); USPD (1917–1919); KPD (1919–1929); KPD(O) (1929–1932); SAPD (1932–1933)
- Other political affiliations: Spartacus League (1914–1918)
- Spouse: Paul Frölich (m. 1948; died 1953)
- Occupation: Activist; Politician
- Central institution membership: 1921–1923: Full member, KPD Zentrale; 1920–1921: Candidate member, KPD Zentrale

Alma Rosalie (Rosi) Wolfstein (after 1948, Rosi Frölich: 27 May 1888 – 11 December 1987) was a German socialist politician. After the murder of her friend and mentor, the communist pioneer Rosa Luxemburg, she inherited Luxemburg's copious collection of papers, and devoted much time to organising the archive. During the 1930s, with her partner Paul Frölich, Rosi Wolfstein worked on an important biography of Luxemburg.

== Life ==
=== Family provenance and early years ===
Rosalie Wolfstein was born at Witten, then a rapidly growing industrial city west of Dortmund in the Ruhr region. Her father, Samuel Wolfstein (1843–1901), was a Jewish businessman. She was one of her parents' four recorded children. Her elder brother, Paul, later died in the First World War: later still, in 1942, both her sisters, Wilhelmine and Bertha, would be deported to Auschwitz concentration camp and murdered.

On leaving the local secondary school Wolfstein undertook a commercial training and embarked on a career as an office worker. In 1908 a change in the law legalised female participation in politics, and Wolfstein lost no time in joining the Social Democratic Party of Germany ("Sozialdemokratische Partei Deutschlands" / SPD). She had already, the previous year, joined the "Women's and Girls' Workers' Education Association" ("Frauen- und Mädchen-Arbeiterbildungsverein") in Hagen. In 1910 she joined the National Employees Association ("Zentralverband der Angestellten" / ZdA), part of the Free Trade Union grouping. By 1913 she had become an SPD party activist in her native Lower Rhine region.

=== Rosa Luxemburg ===
It was in 1910 that she first came across Rosa Luxemburg, four years her senior and already established and respected within the party. On meeting Luxemburg, Wolfstein later wrote she was at once in awe and initially disappointed, because Luxemburg was so small in stature and so different from the woman Wolfstein had expected her to be. Initial disappointment was quickly replaced by respect as the two became friends, each recognising in the other a shared political outlook. Between 1912 and 1913 Wolfstein studied as one of Luxemburg's pupils at the party academy in Berlin. For nine years, till 1919, the two of them worked closely together on political matters. One thing they had in common was a talent for public speaking, and the evening before the 1912 General Election – in which their SPD won twice as many votes as the next placed party – Luxemburg and Wolfstein, described by one admirer as a woman of small stature and extraordinary presence, shared a platform at the final major pre-election event.

When war broke out in the late summer of 1914 Wolfstein was one of those in the SPD who opposed the party leadership decision to agree a political truce at the outbreak of the war and, more specifically, to vote in favour of "war credits". During the war she was an activist within the Spartacus League in the Duisburg region and, as a radical pacifist, was several times arrested, spending in total approximately a year in prison during the war. She took part in the illegal youth conference at Jena in Easter 1916, as a delegate from the Duisburg Socialist Young Workers. In a secret police report dated 10 May 1917 Wolfstein was identified as a "fanatical individual" ("fanatische Persönlichkeit"): she and her fellow campaigners in Duisburg were frequently characterised as "enemy agents" ("feindliche Agenten"). As the scale of the human slaughter on the front line and of the economic destitution on the home front mounted, the number of SPD politicians opposing the war increased, and it was primarily over this issue that the SPD split in 1917. In 1917 Wolfstein was at the founding conference of the breakaway faction, launched as the Independent Social Democratic Party ("Unabhängige Sozialdemokratische Partei Deutschlands" / USPD) at Gotha. She attended as a representative of the Spartacus League, which now became a quasi-autonomous element within the new party.

=== After the war, revolution ===
War ended, formally, in November 1918 and was followed in Germany by an outburst of revolutionary events, especially in the cities, which lasted for about a year. Unusually, in view of her gender, Wolfstein was elected to the Soldiers' and Workers' Council in Düsseldorf, which had become the focus of the revolution for the Lower Rhine region. At the close of 1918 she and Rosa Luxemburg were among the five identifiable women among the 127 delegates at what became the founding congress of the German Communist Party in Berlin. Luxemburg was assassinated a couple of weeks later, but Wolfstein subsequently attended the Second World Congress of the Comintern, held in Moscow in July 1920. Getting to Petrograd and from there to Moscow through the chaos of the Russian Civil War involved disguising herself as a man and using a false passport. In Moscow she met, and according to one source quarreled, with Lenin.

Rosi Wolfstein was away in Düsseldorf on 15 January 1919 when Rosa Luxemburg was murdered in Berlin. Together with her partner, Paul Frölich, for the next ten years she effectively worked as Luxemburg's literary executor, gathering together the various papers left behind into a coherent archive. One product of this was Frölich's biography of Luxemburg, "Rosa Luxemburg. Thoughts and Action" ("Rosa Luxemburg. Gedanke und Tat"), which was published, initially, in Paris in 1939.

=== Party insider: party splits ===
Between 1921 and 1924 she sat as a "United Communist Party" member of the Prussian regional legislature ("Landtag"), where within the parliament she was deputy leader of the party group. Between 1921 and 1923 she was also a member of the party head office and organisation team, where she had responsibility for party publishers. However, use of the word "united" in the party name reflected a continuing propensity to party infighting through the 1920s, and in 1924, after the Ninth Party Congress, held in Frankfurt am Main, Wolfstein resigned her party and parliamentary posts in protest against the "ultra left-wing" party leadership around Ruth Fischer and Arkadi Maslow.

During the second half of the 1920s she was able to devote more of her energies to her work as an editor with the Malik Publishing House. Together with Paul Frölich she also worked on producing the first collected edition of the writings of Rosa Luxemburg. Meanwhile, factionalism within the communist party continued, and in 1929, as the "hardline" faction around Ernst Thälmann, set about aligning the party more closely with the Stalinist faction in Moscow, Wolfstein was one of those identified as a right-wing deviant ("Rechtsabweichlerin"): she was excluded from the party early in 1929. Between 1929 and 1932 she was active within the alternative communist party, known as the Communist Party of Germany (Opposition) ("Kommunistische Partei Deutschlands (Opposition)" / KPDO) created under the leadership of fellow expellees, Heinrich Brandler and August Thalheimer. The KPDO itself split in 1932 and Rosi Wolfstein, together with Paul Frölich and political allies such as Jacob Walcher and August Enderle, joined with the left-wing breakaway faction that now formed the Socialist Workers' Party ("Sozialistische Arbeiterpartei Deutschlands" / SAPD). A fellow member of the SAPD was Willy Brandt who became a lifelong friend. Brandt is on record as commending Wolfstein's "commitment to a combative and liberal socialism" ("Engagement für einen kämpferischen und freiheitlichen Sozialismus"). More than fifty years later, Brandt still used to visit Wolfstein-Frölich in the retirement home where she spent her final years: his last visit to her was in March 1987, some nine months before she died.

=== Nazi Germany: exile ===
In January 1933, the political backdrop was transformed when the Nazi Party took power and eventually converted Germany into a one-party dictatorship. Political activity – except in support of the Nazi Party – became illegal. At the end of February, the Reichstag fire was instantly blamed on the Communists, and in March 1933 those identified as Communists began to be arrested. In March 1933, Rosi Wolfstein, susceptible to Nazi persecution both because of her political record and on account of her Jewishness, fled to Brussels in Belgium. During or before 1936, she relocated to Paris where it is known she was an activist member of the leadership of the exiled German SAPD. In Paris she was among the exiled socialists to sign the call, in December 1936, for a united Popular Front in order to "overthrow Hitler, and all who persecute the German people! For Freedom, Peace and Bread!" ("Sturz Hitlers und aller Peiniger des deutschen Volkes! Für Freiheit, Frieden und Brot!"). She signed, however, not with her real name, but using the pseudonym "Marta Koch".

The Jewish question

Her life constituted a battle against war, racism and social injustice. On a personal level, Rosi Wolfstein never perceived herself as a victim of discrimination as a Jew. She considered herself as enjoying equal rights as a German citizen. Nevertheless, she carefully observed the rising antisemitism and drew the consequences, which for her meant "supporting the socialist movement … because it wishes to abolish all differences."

Ludger Heid

Though I am myself Jewish, I never did very much on the Jewish issue. [Nevertheless,] as long as there is a Jewry, let it exist. I support no special Judaism, but neither do I oppose it. We have to leave it to the Jews to choose their own direction.

-- Rosi Wolfstein-Frölich, 1967

Obwohl ich selbst Jüdin bin, habe ich mich nicht so sehr auf der jüdischen Linie bewegt ... Für mich spielte es keine Rolle, daß sie Juden waren.

-- Rosi Wolfstein-Frölich

War resumed, for France and Germany in September 1939. For eight months life in France felt little changed, but in May 1940 Germany invaded from the north. During the six weeks that it took for the German army to over-run the northern half of the country, the government set about identifying as enemy aliens thousands of German refugees who had, for reasons of politics and/or race, fled to Paris from Nazi Germany. On 2 September 1940 Wolfstein and Frölich were arrested, detained and in due course placed in internment camps in the far south of the country. Wolfstein was accompanied by a report from the Paris police dated January 1941 and describing her as a "communist journalist and propagandist, dangerous to public order" ("journaliste et propagandiste communiste dangereuse pour l'ordre public") . Detention facilities where she was held included Rieucros and finally Bompard. Paul Frölich was held at Vernet and Bassens.

Many of the camps used for "enemy aliens" had originally been set up to accommodate republican fighters returning from defeat in the Spanish Civil War, and initially the emphasis was not on security, but during 1941 the authorities began to formulate plans to separate out Jewish internees and ship them to equivalent facilities inside Germany where their circumstances would be more malign. Thanks to the actions of Varian Fry and his Emergency Rescue Committee, in February 1941 Wolfstein and Frölich were provided with emergency visas. They escaped together to New York City, travelling to North America by way of Lisbon and Martinique.

Woflstein and Frölich lived together in New York from 1941 till 1950. In 1948 they married each other. She was actively involved in various New York based welfare organisations while Frölich focused on academic work.

=== Final years ===
They returned to Germany in 1951, settling in Frankfurt am Main, which till 1949 had been in the American occupation zone and was now beginning to emerge as a major administrative and commercial hub in a new German state, the Federal Republic ("West Germany"). Disillusioned with Soviet mandated communism, she now rejoined the Social Democratic Party, forty three years after first having joined it. She nevertheless remained firmly on the left of the party, an advocate, like her husband, of the elusive "third way" between Communism and Capitalism, and convinced that for historical reasons only the SPD could deliver it. She was also active in the recently created printers' trades union, IG Druck und Papier and was involved in the establishment of the German Journalists' Union which originated in 1951 as a sub-section of the printers' union.

After Paul Frölich died, his widow managed his literary estate and attended to the publication of some of his writings. She died at Frankfurt, half a year short of what would have been her one hundredth birthday. At her burial, which took place in the city's main cemetery, Holger Börner, the regional Minister-president, gave a speech of tribute, asserting that she "always fought with heart and mind for social causes" ("stets mit Herz und Verstand für die soziale Sache eingetreten") and celebrating her as "a second Rosa Luxemburg".
