= Fritz Heckert =

German politician (1884–1936)

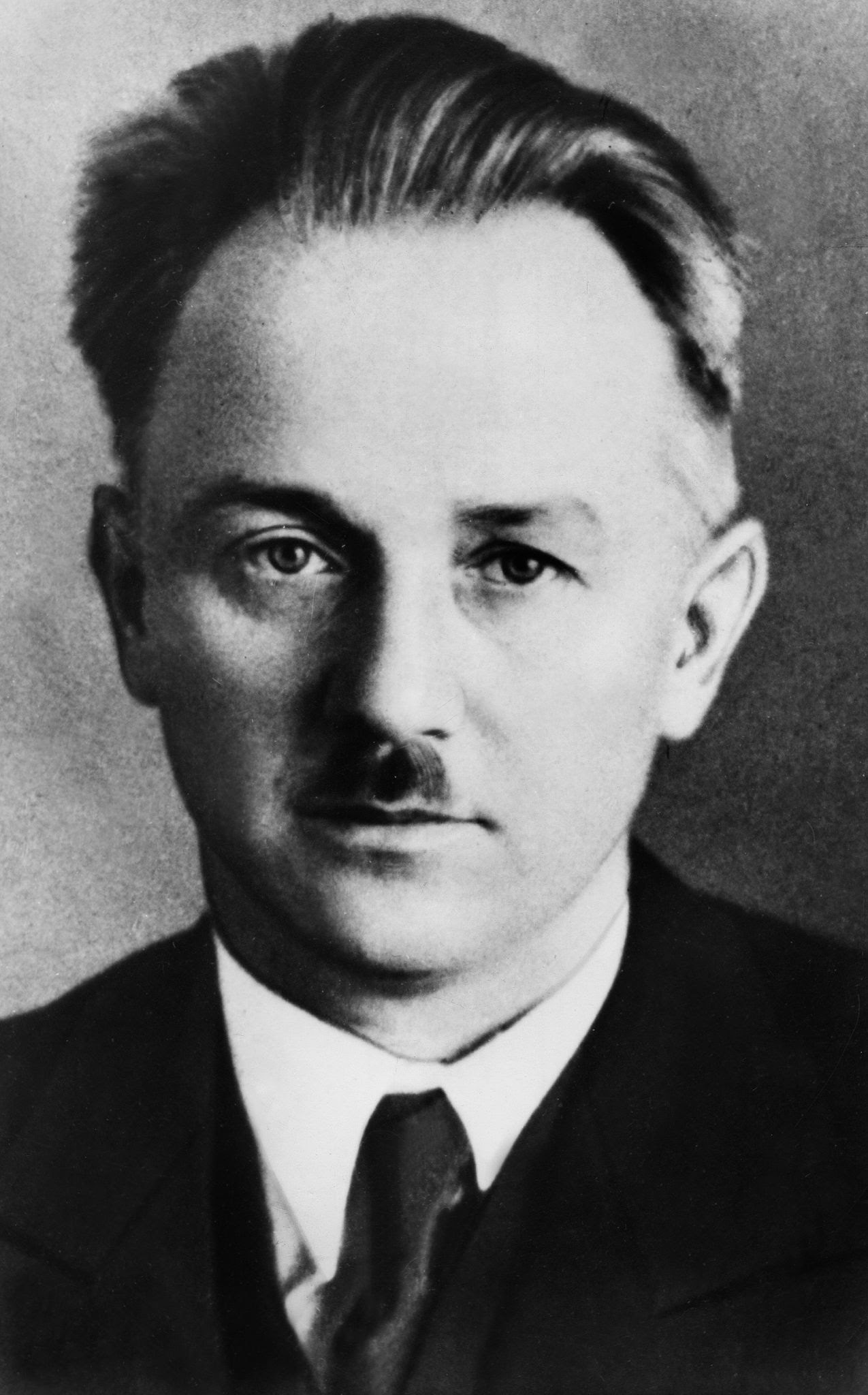
- Heckert c. 1930

Minister of Economic Affairs of the Free State of Saxony
- In office 12 October 1923 – 30 October 1923
- Minister-President: Erich Zeigner
- Preceded by: Alfred Fellisch
- Succeeded by: Alfred Fellisch

Member of the Reichstag for Magdeburg
- In office 27 May 1924 – 28 February 1933
- Preceded by: Multi-member district
- Succeeded by: Constituency abolished

Personal details
- Born: Friedrich Carl Heckert; 28 March 1884 Chemnitz, Kingdom of Saxony, German Empire
- Died: 7 April 1936 (aged 52) Moscow, Soviet Union
- Resting place: Kremlin Wall Necropolis
- Party: SPD (1902–1917); USPD (1917–1919); KPD (1919–1936)
- Other political affiliations: Spartacus League (1914–1919)
- Spouse: Wilma Stammberg
- Known for: Saxon Economic Minister during the German October
- Central institution membership: 1925–1936: Full member, KPD Politburo; 1920–1936: Full member, KPD Central Committee (Note: Zentrale until 1925); 1920: Candidate member, KPD Zentrale; Other offices held: 1918–1919: Chairman, Chemnitz Workers' and Soldiers' Council

Friedrich "Fritz" Carl Heckert (28 March 1884 – 7 April 1936) was a German trade unionist and politician who co-founded the Spartacus League and the Communist Party of Germany. He was a member of the Reichstag from 1924 to 1933, a leading Comintern functionary, and briefly served as the Saxon Economic Minister in 1923.

== Early life ==
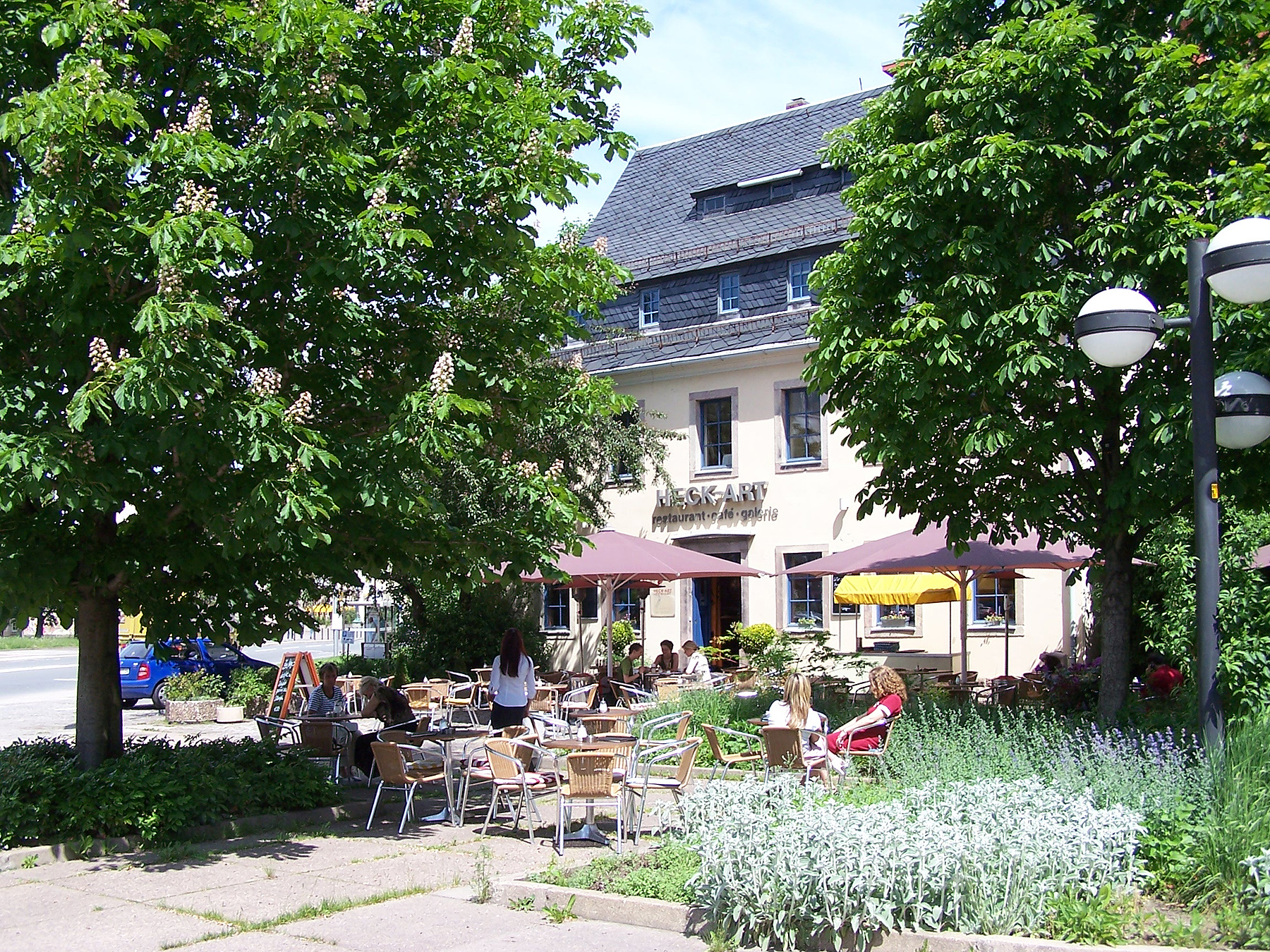
Heckart's birthplace in Chemnitz, now the Heck-Art gallery and restaurant

Fritz Heckert was born in Chemnitz on 28 March 1884, the son of a working-class family; his father was a knife maker and his mother a glove weaver. Both belonged to the Social Democratic Party of Germany (SPD). After school, Heckert learned the bricklaying trade and attended trade school.

In 1902, Heckert joined the German Construction Workers' Union and the SPD, where he belonged to the left wing. In 1911, while in Switzerland as a wandering journeyman, he met his future wife Wilma Stammberg (1885–1967), a Latvian and a member of the Russian Social Democratic Labour Party. During this time he studied Vladimir Lenin and became involved in Bolshevik circles.

== Political career ==
Returning to Chemnitz in early 1912, Heckert became a full-time union secretary. During World War I, he was one of the co-founders of the Spartacus League and the Independent Social Democratic Party of Germany (USPD). After the death of Karl Wilhelm Stolle, Heckert ran in the Reichstag by-election on 13 May 1918 in the Kingdom of Saxony 18 constituency, but was easily defeated by Social Democrat Richard Meier. Their opposing candicacies were a breach of the Burgfrieden truce. (Note: This conflict was based on the fact that Stolle had won his mandate for the SPD (from which the SPD's claim was derived) but had joined the USPD in 1917.)

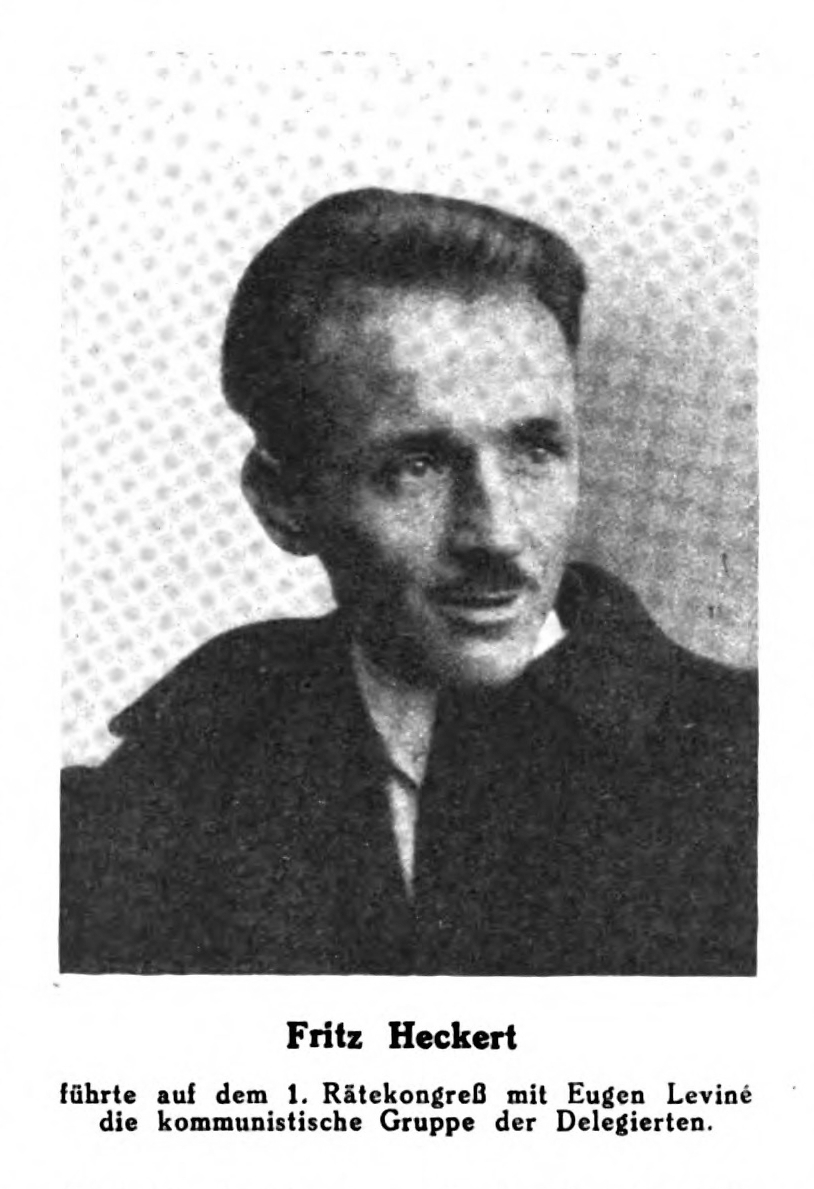
"Fritz Heckert; led the communist group of delegates—together with Eugen Leviné—at the First Congress of Councils."

In November 1918, he became chairman of the Chemnitz Workers' and Soldiers' Council. Heckert was one of the delegates to the founding party conference of the KPD on 30 December 1918. The name "Communist Party of Germany" was his suggestion.

Under the leadership of Heinrich Brandler and Heckert, the Chemnitz KPD organisation was one of the strongest in Germany. At the side of his friend Brandler, Heckert rose to the Central Committee of the KPD (ZK) after the unification party congress with the USPD in December 1920. Except for a brief interruption in 1924, he remained a member of the Central Committee until his death in 1936. Heckert was temporarily the KPD's representative at the Red International of Labor Unions in Moscow, then from 1922 onward he was the deputy of Jacob Walcher, the head of the trade union department at the KPD headquarters in Berlin.

As a member of the party leadership, Heckert was appointed Minister of Economic Affairs of the Free State of Saxony after Minister-President Erich Zeigner formed an SPD-KPD coalition government on 12 October 1923. He served in the Zeigner Cabinet for 19 days during the German October until President Friedrich Ebert issued a Reichsexekution, sending the Reichswehr to forcibly dissolve the government. During this time and the subsequent illegality of the KPD in 1923–24, Heckert was actively involved in the party's preparations for a civil war. This resulted in his imprisonment in October 1924, which lasted until July 1925 when the Reichstag passed a resolution recognizing Heckert's parliamentary immunity.

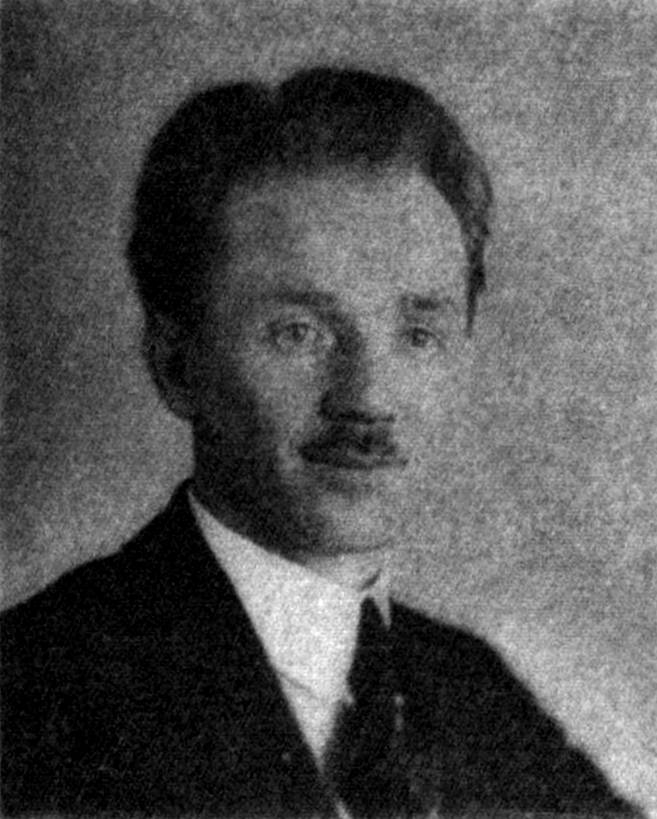
Heckert's official Reichstag portrait, 1924

In the Reichstag elections of May 1924, Heckert won a mandate from the KPD, which he held until 1933. Elected to the Politburo at the 11th Party Congress in 1927, he headed the trade union department of the Central Committee until April 1928, after which the Comintern transferred him to the Profintern in Moscow. From there, during the Wittorf affair, he opposed the replacement of Ernst Thälmann with Walter Ulbricht and returned to the KPD headquarters in Germany. Since the 6th World Congress of the Comintern in 1928, he was a member of the Presidium of the Executive Committee of the Communist International (ECCI).

The 12th Party Congress of the KPD re-elected him to the Central Committee and the Politburo in 1929. In 1931, Heckert was seriously injured in clashes with the SA at a rally in Gelsenkirchen.

== In exile ==
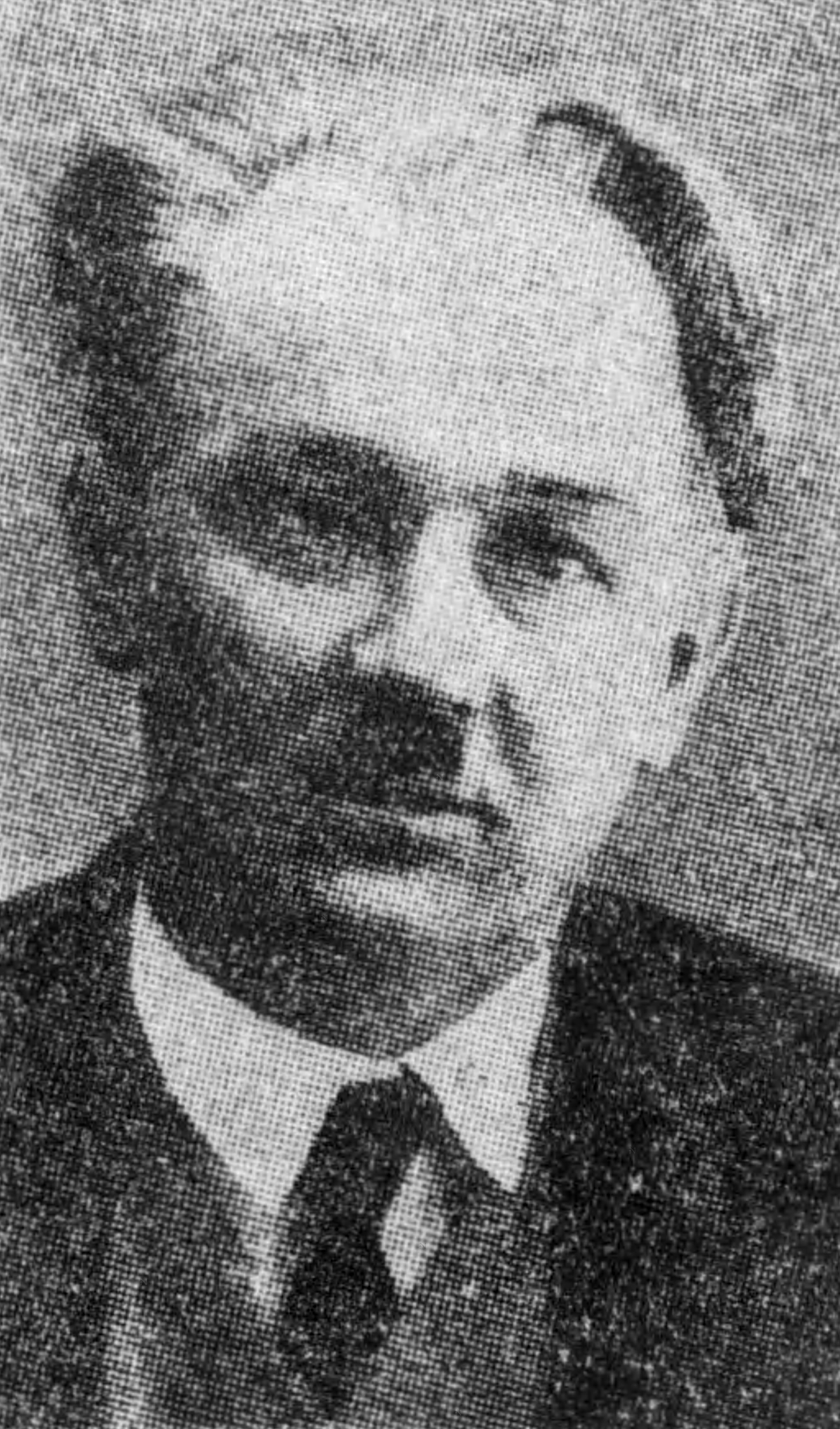
Heckert c. 1934

In 1932, as a representative of the KPD, he returned to the ECCI in Moscow, where he worked until his death. When Adolf Hitler came to power, Heckert's stay in Moscow was not publicly known and he was wanted by the authorities. Heckert's name was on the first expatriation list of the German Reich, published on 25 August 1933.

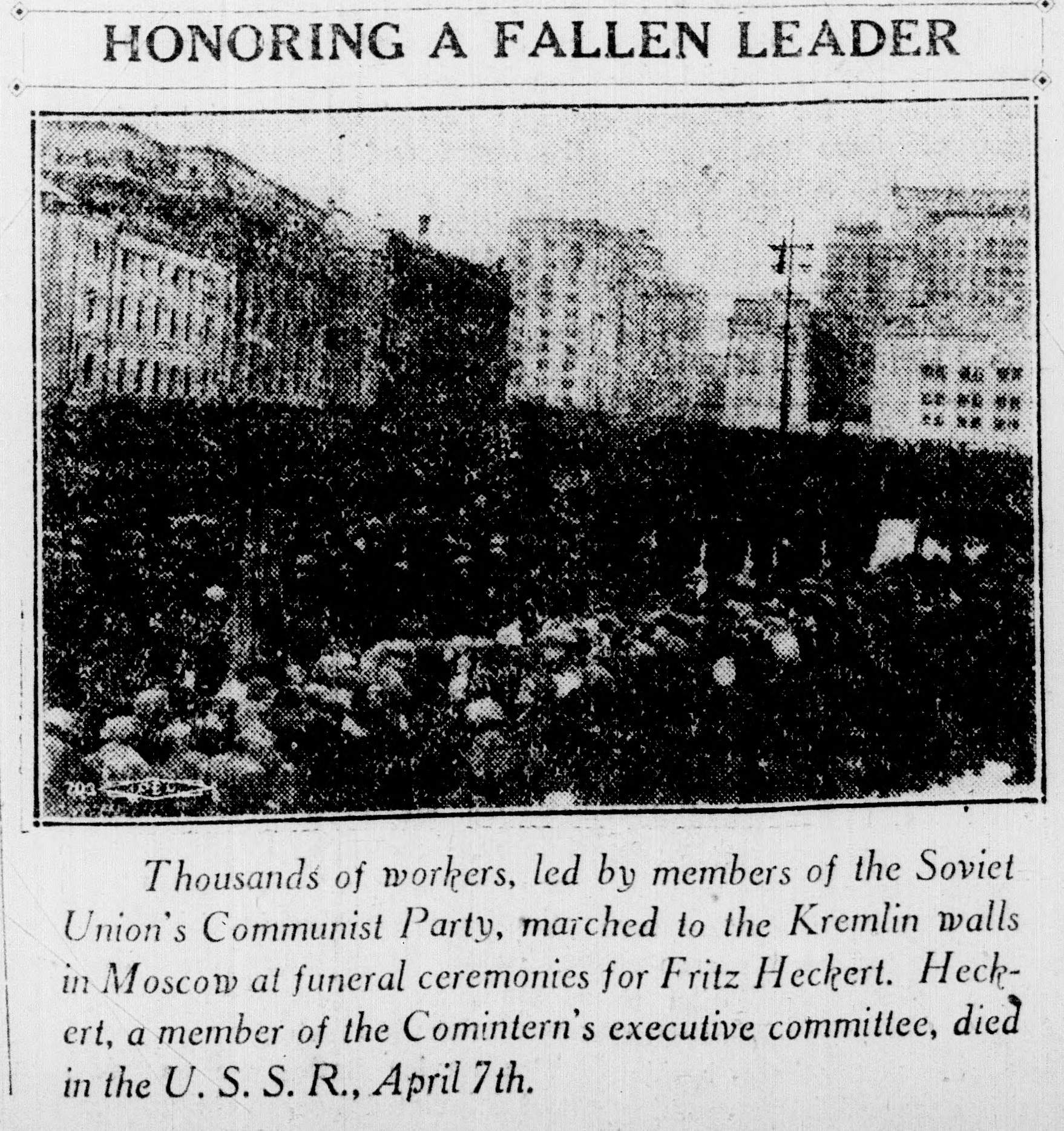
Heckert's funeral procession, from the Western Worker

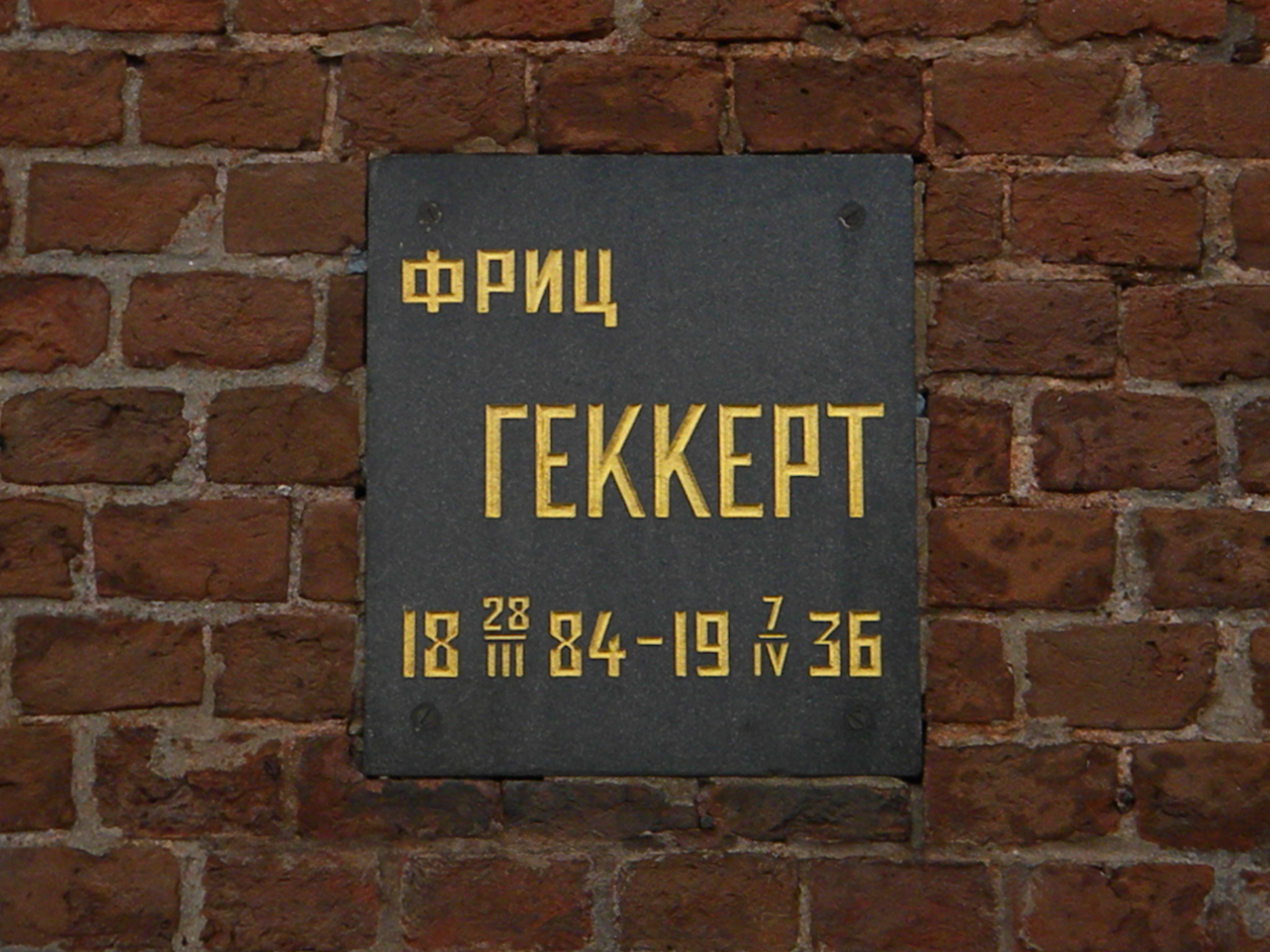
Heckert's grave in the Kremlin Wall Necropolis

Heckert died of a stroke in Moscow on 7 April 1936. His urn was buried in the Kremlin Wall Necropolis. Along with Otto Strupat (1893–1921), Oskar Hellbrück (1884–1921) and Clara Zetkin (1857–1933), he is one of the few Germans to be buried at the Kremlin Wall. His widow Wilma was given an honorary grave in the Pergolenweg grave complex of the Memorial to the Socialists at the Zentralfriedhof Friedrichsfelde.

== Works ==
- What Happened in Germany? (English) Moscow: Party Publishing House, 1933.
- Heckert Archive at Marxists.org.
