= Walter Stoecker =

German communist politician

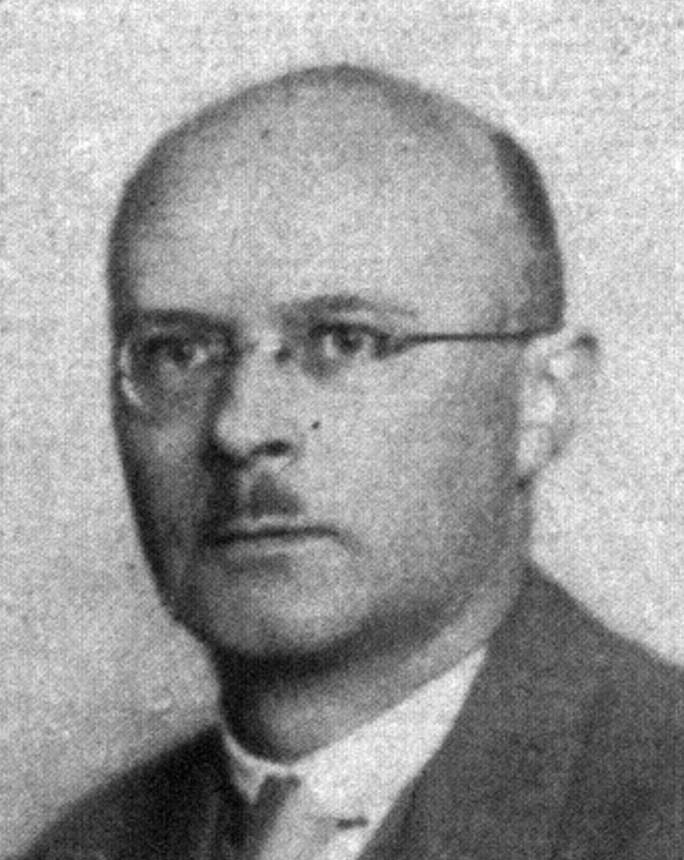
- Stoecker c. 1930

Member of the Reichstag for Cologne–Aachen
- In office 24 June 1920 – 31 July 1932
- Preceded by: Constituency established
- Succeeded by: Multi-member district

Personal details
- Born: 9 April 1891 Cologne-Deutz, Rhine Province, Prussia, Germany
- Died: 10 March 1939 (aged 47) Buchenwald concentration camp, Weimar, Thuringia, Germany
- Party: SPD (1909–1917); USPD (1917–1920); KPD (after 1920)
- Spouse: Anna Elfriede Bayley
- Children: Helmuth; Helga
- Occupation: Politician; Activist; Journalist

Military service
- Allegiance: German Empire
- Branch/service: Imperial German Army
- Years of service: 1915–1918
- Battles/wars: World War I
- Central institution membership: 1924: Full member, KPD Politburo; 1920–1921, 1923–1924, 1927–1935: Full member, KPD Central Committee (Note: Zentrale until 1925)

Walter Stoecker (9 April 1891 – 10 March 1939) was a German Communist politician. He served as a member of the Reichstag between 1920 and 1932.

== Life ==
=== Provenance and early years ===
Walter Stoecker was born in Cologne-Deutz (across from the cathedral, on the right bank of the river), the son of Elisabeth (née Bieker; 1857–1918) and Ernst Stoecker (1850–1921); his father was an engineer. Still slightly unusually for the time and place, he grew up in a family described as "konfessionslos", meaning that the family were not members of the church and not subject to "Kirchensteuer" (church tax). He attended primary school, middle school and then a "Realschule" (traditional secondary school) in the city during 1907/08, but was obliged to leave the "Realschule" after a year, on account of financial difficulties within the family. During or after his school career he completed a commercial training, mostly through attending evening classes after work.

Stoecker became a member of the Cologne Young Socialist Movement ("sozialistische Arbeiterjugendbewegung") in 1908, and joined the Social Democratic Party of Germany (SPD) in 1909. In 1910 he took an unpaid internship with one or more regional party newspapers in Kiel and Cologne, and was employed as a contributing editor and reporter between 1911 and 1913. He also spent a year as a student, starting in 1912 or 1913, during which he studied History and Applied Economics ("Volkswirtschaft") at Cologne, Leipzig and, according to at least one source, Zürich. Mention is also made of his having led a socialist student organisation in Cologne during this period.

=== War years ===
War broke out, from a German perspective, at the end of July 1914. Almost at the outset, in August 1914, Stoecker emerged as an anti-war activist. He was particularly critical of the "right-wing" SPD party leadership in parliament as, following after considerable soul-searching, they declared what amounted to a parliamentary truce for the duration of the war. In parliament the SPD would vote in favour of war funding. They were motivated variously by traditional patriotism, the hope that after the war the German government might, in return, agree to a more democratic voting system, and by the widespread belief that if Germany were to lose the war, the country would finally fall under the Russian tyranny which already extended across much of what had formerly been known as Poland. There were plenty of party activists across Germany who believed, even in 1914, that none of these arguments justified SPD parliamentary backing for the war: Walter Stoecker was one of them. That did not prevent him from being conscripted into the army in February 1915, however. He was a soldier till November 1918.

As more and more reports came through of the slaughter on the frontline, and shortages of almost everything made life for families left behind on the home front ever more difficult, the initial enthusiasm for the war among the citizens of the belligerent powers drained away. In Germany the SPD finally split at the start of 1917, principally over the parliamentary leadership's continued backing for the war. Walter Stoecker was a founding member of the breakaway Independent Social Democratic Party ("Unabhängige Sozialdemokratische Partei Deutschlands" / USPD). At around the same time he was badly wounded in the fighting in Macedonia.

=== Germany as a republic ===
After the war ended and revolution spread from the naval ports in the north to factories and cities across the country, Stoecker became a leading participant in the Workers' and Soldiers' Soviet in Cologne. Between December 1918 and June 1919 he was editor of "Volkstribüne" the USPD's local newspaper in Elberfeld (Wuppertal). With the city under British military occupation at the time, Cologne did not feature prominently in the more extreme manifestations of the "German revolution". For a time during 1919 Stoecker served as a Cologne city councillor. At the start of 1919, he had been elected to the Prussian state assembly, mandated to produce a new post-imperial Prussian constitution, and a precursor body to the replacement Prussian "Landtag" / "Diet" which was elected on 20 February 1921.

Through 1919 Stoecker was active at a party level. There were two USPD party conferences held that year, in March and October. Walter Stocker attended them both as a delegate. In June/July 1919 he was appointed secretary to the party's national leadership team, a job which carried significant influence. The party leadership was based in Berlin-Grunewald: it may have been the new appointment that caused him to leave his journalistic job in the Ruhr region. The job evidently involved spending considerable time away from Cologne, though Stocker would retain close links to the Rhineland region throughout his political career.

=== Party ructions ===
Following the disastrous end to the war in November 1918, the issue of opposition to support for the war, on the basis of which the USPD had been founded, lost relevance. During 1919 there was an increasingly urgent need to agree a future purpose and direction for the party. There were those who favoured re-integration with the SPD, while a larger faction, on the left of the party, was keen for a merger with the new Communist Party, which had been founded at a three-day conference held in Berlin between 30 December 1918 and 1 January 1919. Walter Stocker, with other leading party comrades including Ernst Däumig and Wilhelm Koenen, pushed for a merger between the USPD and the Communists. In June/July 1920 he was one of those from the party who attended the 2nd World Congress of the Comintern in the Soviet Union. Extensive networking took place: Stoecker even had the opportunity to get to know Lenin personally. The Soviet leader took a close interest in political developments in Germany. By the end of 1920 Stoecker was one of many former members of the USPD to have become members of an enlarged version of the Communist Party of Germany. Nevertheless, the development was not so much a "clean merger" of parties and a splintering of the USPD. Some comrades simply returned to the SPD while others remained members of the USPD, which survived as a much diminished fringe movement till 1931.

=== Reichstag ===
A general election was held on 6 June 1920. The election represented a highpoint for the USPD, which won nearly 18% of the vote: under the recently introduced proportional representation-based voting system, that entitled them to 83 seats in the Reichstag (national parliament). (Note: At the next general election, held in 1924, the USPD would receive less than 1% of the vote and no seats in the Reichstag.) One of the 83 USPD Reichstag members was Walter Stoecker. He represented Electoral District 26 (Düsseldorf-West) By the end of 1920 he was sitting not as a USPD parliamentarian but as a Communist Party (KPD) member. He would remain a member of the Reichstag for twelve years, till July 1932.

=== The Communist Party of Germany in the 1920s ===
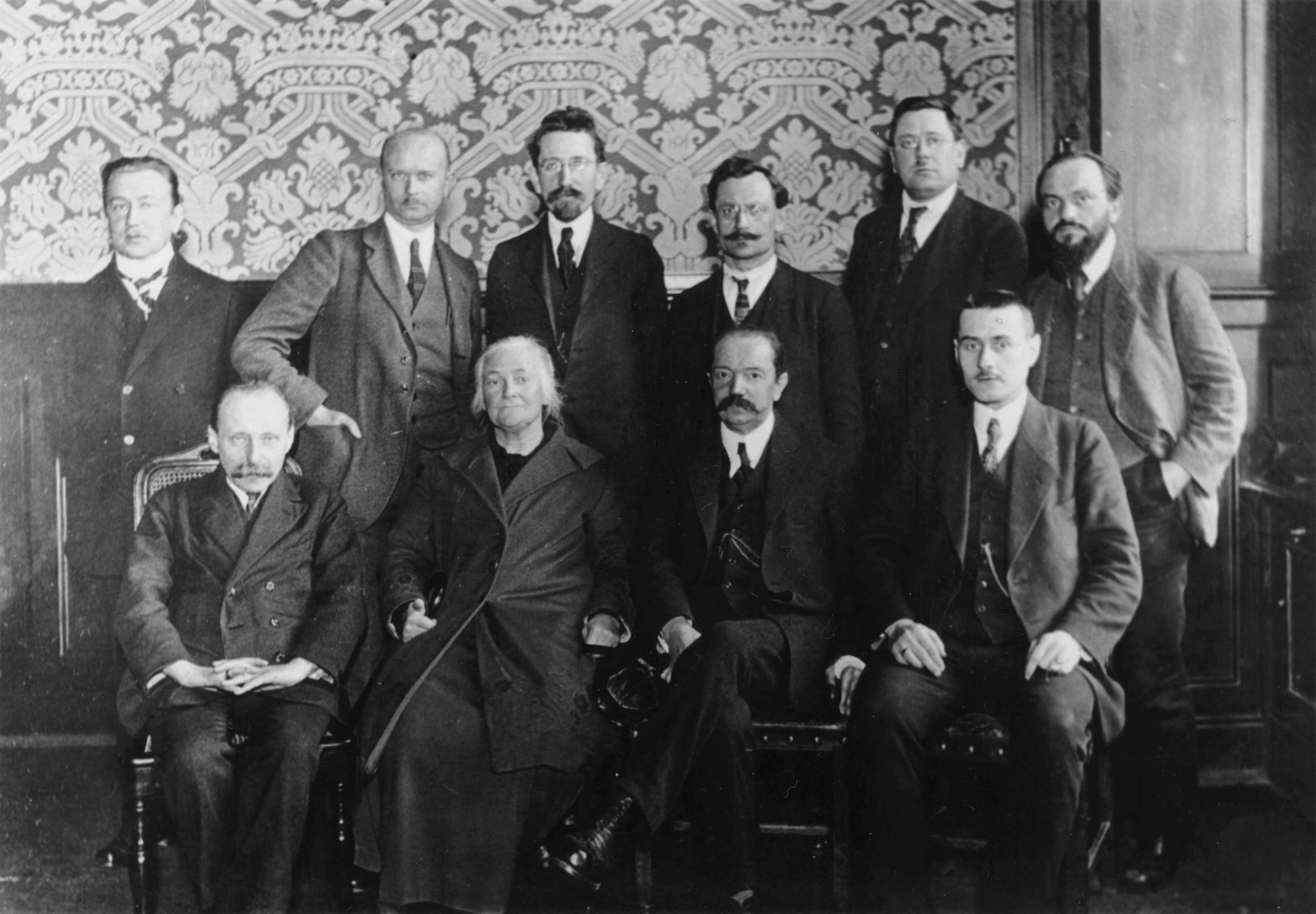
Members of the Reichstag faction of the KPD c. 1921. Sitting from left to right: Joseph Herzfeld, Clara Zetkin, Emil Eichhorn, Georg Berthelé. Standing from left to right: Max Heydemann, Walter Stoecker, Wilhelm Koenen, Wilhelm Bartz, Heinrich Malzahn, Paul Frölich.

Between October and December 1920 Stoecker served as one of three editors-producers on "Kommunistische Rundschau", a short-lived political journal of which six editions appeared during that three-month period. In December 1920 the "Communist Party of Germany" rebranded itself as the "United Communist Party of Germany" ("Vereinigte Kommunistische Partei Deutschlands" / VKPD). The new name, which reflected the expansion resulting from the many members who had moved across from the USPD, was not universally used even at the time, and would be abandoned by the party leadership after barely two years. During 1920/21 Walter Stoecker was one of the enlarged party's six party secretaries and a member of its executive committee, (Note: The party executive committee was the governing body of the Communist Party. During the 1920s it morphed into the party's Central Committee.) of which, between February and August 1921, he served as co-chair, jointly with Heinrich Brandler. He was also one of the party's most prominent Reichstag members.

The economic crises of the early 1920s found their echo in social and political instability. Instability was a particular feature of the Communist Party, with bitter ideological rivalries at the leadership level reverberating through the lower levels of the party hierarchy. At the Jena party congress, held during August 1921, Walter Stoecker ceased to be a member of the party's national leadership team, though he remained influential within the party apparatus, partly on account of his role in the Reichstag.

Eighteen months later Stoecker was returned to the (significantly expanded) party central committee at that year's party congress, held at Leipzig during January/February 1923. He was also given an important regional position as senior "Polleiter" (loosely, "head of policy") for the Communist Party's "region west", which comprised approximately the area covered since 1947 by North Rhine-Westphalia. According to at least one source he had effectively been filling an equivalent role on a less formal basis since 1921. The party had its regional headquarters at Cologne. During 1923 he was much involved in preparation for the October uprising in Hamburg (which failed in its objectives), though the extent and precise details of his involvement have remained undisclosed. Parliament was dissolved in October 1924 in anticipation of the general election scheduled for December, which the authorities saw as an opportunity to issue an arrest warrant against Stoecker in respect of his suspected involvement in the uprising the previous year. The question of whether his parliamentary immunity could be set aside because parliament was not actually in session remained untested, however, since the arrest warrant was never executed. He may have stayed away from the Frankfurt party congress in April 1924, since the record indicates that his membership of the party central committee was not renewed on that occasion.

Stoecker was re-elected to the Reichstag in December 1924 which put an end to any residual concern about possible loss of parliamentary immunity from arrest. He now became leader - in effect co-leader with party leader Ernst Thälmann - of the 45 member party group in the assembly. He also teamed up with Wilhelm Pieck (who between 1921 and 1928 sat as a member of the Prussian "Landtag" ("state parliament") rather than, as subsequently, of the Reichstag ("national parliament")), to produce the party's regular publication "Der Rote Wähle" ("The Red Voter").

In 1925, following the "open letter" affair and the removal of Ruth Fischer along with the leadership team around her, and its rapid replacement with a more uncompromisingly pro-Moscow leadership team under Ernst Thälmann, Walter Stoecker, still identified as a left-leaning comrade quickly recovered his influence within the party apparatus. Then at the Essen party congress in March 1927. Stoecker was briefly critical of Thälmann's role in the aftermath of the Wittorf affair in 1928, and even at one point vote for Thälmann's temporary suspension pending further discussion. However, it very quickly became clear that Ernst Thälmann retained the Soviet leader's total confidence, and Stoecker was one of many comrades in and around the party leadership team who quickly came to realise that Thälmann's judgement of John Wittorf could not, after all, have been at fault. Stoecker's party career did not, at the time, appear to have suffered any lasting damage over the matter. 1929 saw him re-elected to membership of the party central committee. He had already, in September 1928, accepted the chairmanship of the newly launched "Bund der Freunde der Sowjetunion" / "Association of Friends of the Soviet Union". He had been a co-founder of the organisation, established with encouragement from Moscow in order both to communicate "the truth about building socialism in the Soviet Union" and to help prevent a future war between the Soviet Union and western countries.

By 1930 it had become clear that Stoecker was again becoming marginalised within the party apparatus. He had been replaced in 1929 by his parliamentary comrade Ernst Torgler as leader of the party's members Reichstag. By the time of the July 1932 general election, the party was no longer even listing him as a candidate for re-election.

During the early 1930s Stoecker's political involvement became increasingly focused on international aspects of communism. He had already undertaken a mission for the Comintern in 1926, and now he worked for the Comintern as an "instructor". With Leon Purman and Jules Humbert-Droz, he spent a lengthy period in Spain during the crisis-strewn period preceding the Civil War. Towards the end of August 1932 he undertook a trip to Amsterdam, this time in his capacity as chairman of the International Association of Friends of the Soviet Union. The meeting was billed as an "anti-war congress". These events, increasingly hard to arrange anywhere in Europe as the 1930s progressed, were also important as opportunities for informal networking. There was a large contingent of delegates from England. These included Ivor Montagu, a communist scion of the Montagu banking dynasty, who attended as a representative of the British branch of the FSU. It subsequently became clear that Stoecker took the opportunity to get to know one another. Six months later the Stoecker family found itself in desperate need of a powerful friend in England.

=== Hitler years ===
In January 1933 the Hitler government took power and lost no time in exchanging German democracy for a one-party dictatorship. On 7 February 1933 Walter Stoecker was one of the participants at the "illegal" Sporthaus Ziegenhals meeting, celebrated subsequently (especially during the "East German" years) as the last meeting held by the German Communist Party leadership before the participants were arrested, killed, or in a few cases managed to flee abroad. The Reichstag Fire took place over night on 27/28 February 1933 and was followed with a rapidity which commentators, even at the time, found suspicious, by the Reichstag Fire Decree. Walter Stoecker was one of many known communists taken into government custody on the night of the fire, a few hours following its outbreak.

Elfriede Stoecker was not arrested. She immediately fled the country with Helmuth and Helga, the couple's children. Elfriede and the children would all outlive the Hitler régime and survive the war. In England they made their way to the home of Ivor Montagu and his wife, known to friends and family as "Hell" Montagu. (Note: Ivor Montagu had married Eileen Hellstern (1904-1984) in 1927, causing widespread consternation in English society because "Hell" was the typist daughter of a bootmaker from Camberwell in East London, while Ivor Montagu had been born to wealth and status.) The Stoecker's children were at particular risk from a National Socialist government since, according to at least one source, Elfriede was deemed Jewish. The Montagus were surprised to see Elfriede and her children, but agreed to look after the children. Reports vary as to whether Elfriede returned at once to Germany or remained for some time in England. Helmuth, aged 12 and Helga, aged 8 found themselves enrolled at Summerhill School, a progressive boarding establishment in Suffolk, created and directed by the formidable education reformer Alexander Sutherland Neill from Forfar. Rowna Hellstern-Montagu, aged 11, was already a pupil. In May 1933 the English intelligence services intercepted a particularly moving letter received from Walter Stoecker in which the writer, by now an inmate in the Sonnenburg concentration camp, enquired after his children's health and welfare, and urged them to master English, but not to forget their German.

Following his arrest at the end of February 1933, Walter Stoecker was taken to the "protective custody" establishment at Berlin-Spandau. From there the authorities transferred him to Sonnenburg concentration camp, sited on marshy land close to the Oder River between Berlin and Posen during April 1933. During April/May 1934 the Sonnenburg camp was closed and Stoecker was one of several hundred former inmates transferred the Lichtenburg concentration camp near Wittenberg. At each camp Stoecker emerged as a member of the (illegal) communist leadership team. He was also able to correspond with his wife, through whom he secured the discussion and passage of an important resolution at the party's "Brussels congress". (Note: After the German Communist Party was outlawed by the government during 1933, it became necessary for any party congresses that the party was able to arrange to be held outside Germany. For reasons of security the party congress always referred to in planning documents and subsequent reports as the "Brussels congress" was the one held in October 1935 at Kuntsevo just outside Moscow.)

The final move came in August 1937 when he was sent with hundreds of other prisoners to a vast construction site at the Ettersberg hillside, just outside Weimar. The others included Theodor Neubauer and Albert Kuntz. With other inmates, the three men set up the kernel of a communist cell inside the Buchenwald ("Beech Wood") concentration camp, as it was becoming known. It was at Buchenwald that Walter Stoecker died, worn down by torture, undernourishment and the heavy quarrying work. His death finally came about on 10 March 1939. The immediate cause of his death was probably an experimental anti-Typhus vaccine administered as part of a test programme organised by the camp physician, Dr. Ding-Schuler (who subsequently became notorious for his extensive medical experimentation on Buchenwald inmates).

== The widow and the children ==
Little is known of the later years of Anna Elfriede Stoecker. She died in East Berlin on 3 August 1966. It is likely that after delivering her children to relative safety in England in 1933 she returned to Germany and lived quietly in successively Hitler's Germany (1933–1945), the Soviet occupation zone of Germany (1845–1949) and Walter Ulbricht's Soviet-Socialist East Germany (1949–1966). Ashes identified as her husband's remains had been disinterred after 1945 and placed in Friedrichsfelde cemetery in the section reserved for the physical remains of heroes of socialism, and after she died Elfriede's Stoecker's physical remains were placed close by.

At some point Helmuth and Helga Stoecker moved out of Ivor and Hell Montagu's home, and were instead fostered by a Captain Lamont in Yorkshire, in the northern part of England. The Stoecker's elder child, Helmuth Stoecker, attended the University of Bristol during 1939/40: he studied History. He was then identified by the English government as an Enemy alien and, with thousands of other refugees from Nazism who had sought safety in England, removed to a prison or detention camp. After the underlying policy had become discredited and been reversed he was released, but there was no return to university in England. Instead he was employed in farm and factory work till 1947 when he was able to make his way back to Berlin in what had become Germany's Soviet occupation zone. Between 1947 and 1950 he studied at the University of Leipzig, which was also administered as part of the Soviet zone between 1945 and 1949. His teachers at Leipzig included Walter Markov. He worked for the "General [East] German News Service" between 1950 and 1952, and then for the young country's new Museum for History during 1952/53, before returning to his academic career. He received his doctorate at Berlin in 1957 in return for a dissertation on "Germany and China in the nineteenth century: Penetration of German capitalism". His professorship followed quickly. He continued to teach at the University of Berlin till his retirement in 1986.

Helga Stoecker did not live in the public eye. She appears to have returned with her brother in 1947, to the Soviet occupation zone (after 1949 the Soviet sponsored German Democratic Republic / East Germany), and to have pursued a career in teaching. She was a recipient of the Pestalozzi Medal for loyal service (generally in the field of education).
