= Edwin Hoernle =

German politician, educator and agronomist

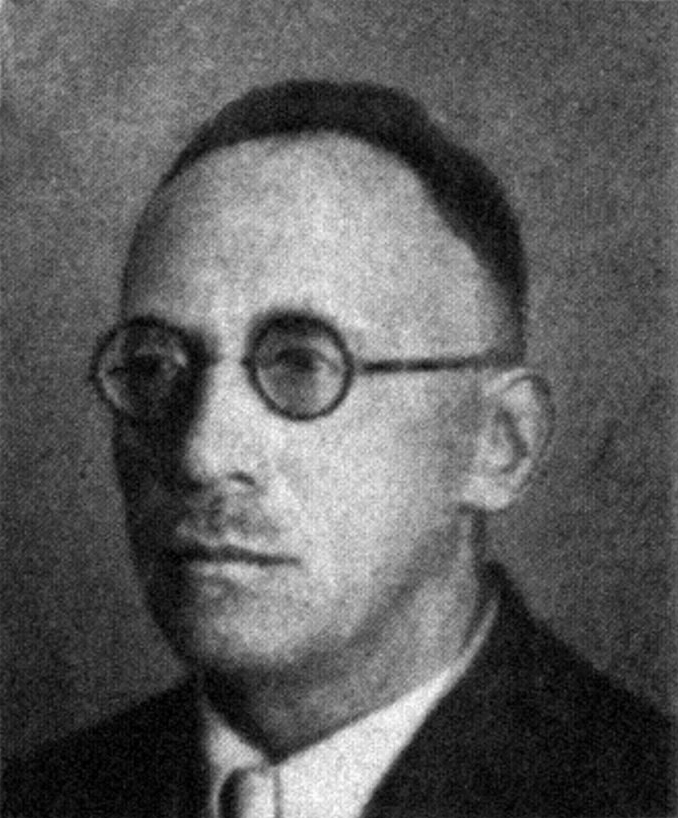
- Hoernle c. 1930

President of Agriculture and Forestry for the German Economic Commission
- In office 15 August 1945 – 7 October 1949
- Chairman: Heinrich Rau
- Preceded by: Position established
- Succeeded by: Ernst Goldenbaum (as Minister of Agriculture and Forestry

Member of the Reichstag for Pomerania
- In office 5 January 1925 – 28 February 1933
- Preceded by: Multi-member district
- Succeeded by: Constituency abolished

Personal details
- Born: 11 December 1883 Cannstatt, Kingdom of Württemberg, German Empire
- Died: 21 July 1952 (aged 68) Bad Liebenstein, Bezirk Suhl, East Germany
- Party: SPD (1910–1919); KPD (1919–1946); SED (after 1946)
- Other political affiliations: Spartacus League (1916–1918)
- Spouse(s): Helene Heß (m. 1909; div. 1923) Hedda Ickert (m. 1932)
- Children: Alfred
- Education: University of Tübingen; Humboldt University of Berlin; Academy of Sciences of the Soviet Union
- Occupation: Politician; Economist; Author; Journalist

Military service
- Allegiance: German Empire
- Branch/service: Imperial German Army
- Years of service: 1903; 1916–1918
- Battles/wars: World War I (WIA)
- Central institution membership: 1921–1924: Full member, KPD Politburo; 1945–1946: Full member, KPD Central Committee; 1921–1924: Full member, KPD Zentrale; Other offices held: 1919–1922: Secretary of Agitation and Propaganda, KPD Zentrale; 1919–1920: Political Leader, Württemberg KPD

Edwin Hoernle (11 December 1883 – 21 July 1952) was a German communist politician, author, educator, agricultural economist and a Marxist theoretician. An early member of the Zentrale and Politburo of the Communist Party of Germany (KPD), he served in the Reichstag from 1925 to 1933 and was one of the party's leading agricultural experts.

He spent the Nazi period in Moscow where, during the final years of the Second World War, he was a founding member of the Soviet-backed National Committee for a Free Germany (NKFD). Following the war's end, he served as minister of agriculture in the Soviet occupation zone, resigning shortly before the establishment of the German Democratic Republic (East Germany) in 1949.

== Life ==
=== Provenance and early years ===
Edwin Hoernle was born in Cannstatt, a rapidly industrialising suburb on the northern edge of Stuttgart. Hermann Hoernle, his father, was a Christian missionary who later became a rural parson. He was one of his parents' four recorded children. Because of his father's calling, Edwin Hoernle spent the earlier years of his childhood, till 1889, in the East Indies. His mother, Marie, was the daughter of an organ builder.

=== Education, politics and first marriage ===
At the age of ten, by now growing up in the village of Beimbach back in Württemberg, he was already writing poems and beginning to distance himself ideologically from the Protestant piety of his parents. Hoernle was schooled privately between 1890 and 1896. He then attended secondary schools in Ludwigsburg and Stuttgart, successfully completing his school final exams (Abitur) in 1902. He performed his military service with an infantry regiment in 1903. He studied Theology, Philosophy and History at Tübingen and Berlin between 1904 and 1909. It was in Berlin that he came into contact with the Social Democratic Party of Germany (SPD), which for many in the German political establishment was still not accepted as a "mainstream" political party. He also met Helene Heß (1886–1956), who later became his first wife. Their son Alfred was born in 1906. At this stage, however, they moved in together without the benefit of any marriage certificate, a development which triggered family hostility. In 1909 the couple married and Edwin passed his "Theological service exam", taking work as a church vicar. Three months later he broke with his family, quit the church and, early in 1910, joined the SPD. Over the next few years he supported himself as a private tutor and contributed political articles to various SPD journals such as Die Neue Zeit.

=== Journalism and the war years ===
Within the party Hoerle gravitated towards the left-wing, becoming a supporter of Franz Mehring and Rosa Luxemburg, who soon became a personal friend of the Hoerles. During the politically fevered pre-war years there were various other SPD publications to which Hoerle contributed, including the bi-monthly magazine Die Gleichheit, produced by Clara Zetkin, and seen by commentators as Germany's leading journal of the Social Democratic women's movement. In 1912 he became editor of the "Feuilleton section" of the SPD regional daily newspaper Schwäbische Tagwacht. After war broke out he and his co-editors, Jacob Walcher and Arthur Crispien received a party reprimand because they were deeply critical of the party leadership, which had implemented what amounted to a parliamentary truce over the issue of voting to fund the war. In 1916 Hoerle joined the anti-war Spartacus League. On 23/24 April 1916 he attended the (illegal) "Opposition Socialist Youth" conference in Jena as a delegate from the Stuttgart Young Socialists. He was arrested in June 1916 and sent to the frontline in August 1916 as a member of a "punishment battalion". He was arrested again in April 1917 and assigned to a Punishment Unit after it was determined that he had been distributing copies of the illegal anti-war so-called "Spartakusbriefe" (Spartacus Letters). Badly wounded in September 1918, he was transferred to an army hospital facility in Stuttgart the following month.

=== Post war chaos and Communist Party membership ===
Military defeat in November 1918 was followed by a year of revolutionary uprisings which started with a navy mutiny in Kiel and quickly spread to the industrial cities and then, as frontline survivors made their way home to face unemployment and acute shortages, across the country more generally. In Stuttgart Edwin Hoernle became a member of the city's Workers' and Soldiers' Soviet ("Council"). He is also described as a co-founder of the Communist Party of Germany (KPD), although he is not listed among those who actually attended the new party's founding congress in Berlin, which took place over three days, between 30 December 1918 and 1 January 1919. At one stage he was editor in chief of Die Rote Fahne ("The Red Flag"), the party's newspaper. However, he spent six months between January and June 1919 detained in Fort Ulm as a leading defendant in the so-called "Stuttgart Communist Trial". He was acquitted. In 1919 Hoernle was a co-founder of the party branch in Württemberg, which he led during 1919/20. Meanwhile, he worked as editor-in-chief of the newspapers Kommunist and Der Pflug ("The Plough").

=== Party man ===
It was partly on account of his university education that among political comrades Edwin Hoernle was respected as an expert on training and education. In October 1920 the national party leadership in Berlin mandated him to set up an Agriculture Department within the party structure. Till the end of 1922 he was responsible for the party's training department (which later became the Agitprop department) and was also, for many years, in charge of "Communist children's work". In addition he found time to publish books on political topics, along with several volumes of poetry.

Between 1921 and 1924 Edwin Hoernle was a member of the national KPD leadership team. He attended the Fourth World Congress of the Communist International ("Comintern"), which took place in Moscow during November/December 1922, and was elected as a second German member (alongside Clara Zetkin) of the Comintern Executive Committee. He remained in Moscow for most of 1923. His previously published poetry he now identified as "by-products of Communist Party Work" ("Nebenprodukte kommunistischer Parteiarbeit"). Meanwhile, the failure (from the Communist viewpoint) of the Hamburg Uprising in October 1923 triggered a wave of recrimination within the party and a fragmenting of party unity among the leadership. Hoernle initially aligned with the "right-wingers" around Heinrich Brandler and August Thalheimer, but these two were blamed by comrades for the failure of the Hamburg uprising and summoned to Moscow to explain matters. Hoernle then aligned himself with the party "pragmatists" such as Ernst Meyer, but Meyer was also falling out of favour with the extremists who were in the ascendancy and during 1924 Edwin Hoernle ceased to be a member of the national Communist Party leadership team. There were also personal troubles. In 1923 Helene Hoernle left her husband and went to live with their friend and party comrade Heinrich Rau.

=== Reichstag membership and party work ===
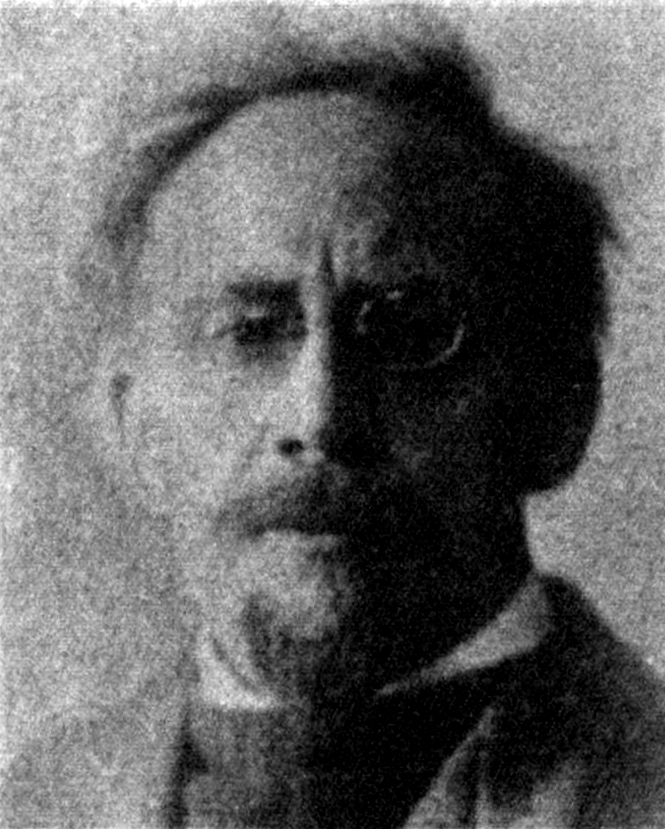
Hoernle's official Reichstag portrait, 1924

The party's new left-wing leadership under Ruth Fischer took steps to block Hoernle's candidacy for the Reichstag in May 1924. However, Fischer was never entirely trusted by Stalin which weakened her control over the party on the domestic front. During the second half of the year Hoernle found himself being sought by the police, and was obliged to live "illegally" (i.e. unregistered) till December 1924. A police profile from this time describes him as 1.72 meters (5 ft 7 in) tall with dark blonde hair and a pronounced Swabian dialect. 1924 was another crisis year, and a year of two general elections. The second of these took place on 7 December 1924. The Communists ended up with approximately 9% of the popular vote and 45 seats. Despite opposition from the party leadership in Berlin, one of those 45 seats went to Edwin Hoernle, who sat as the only Communist Member from the East Prussia electoral district. He remained a Reichstag member through a period of increasing political polarisation, leading to parliamentary deadlock, till 1933.

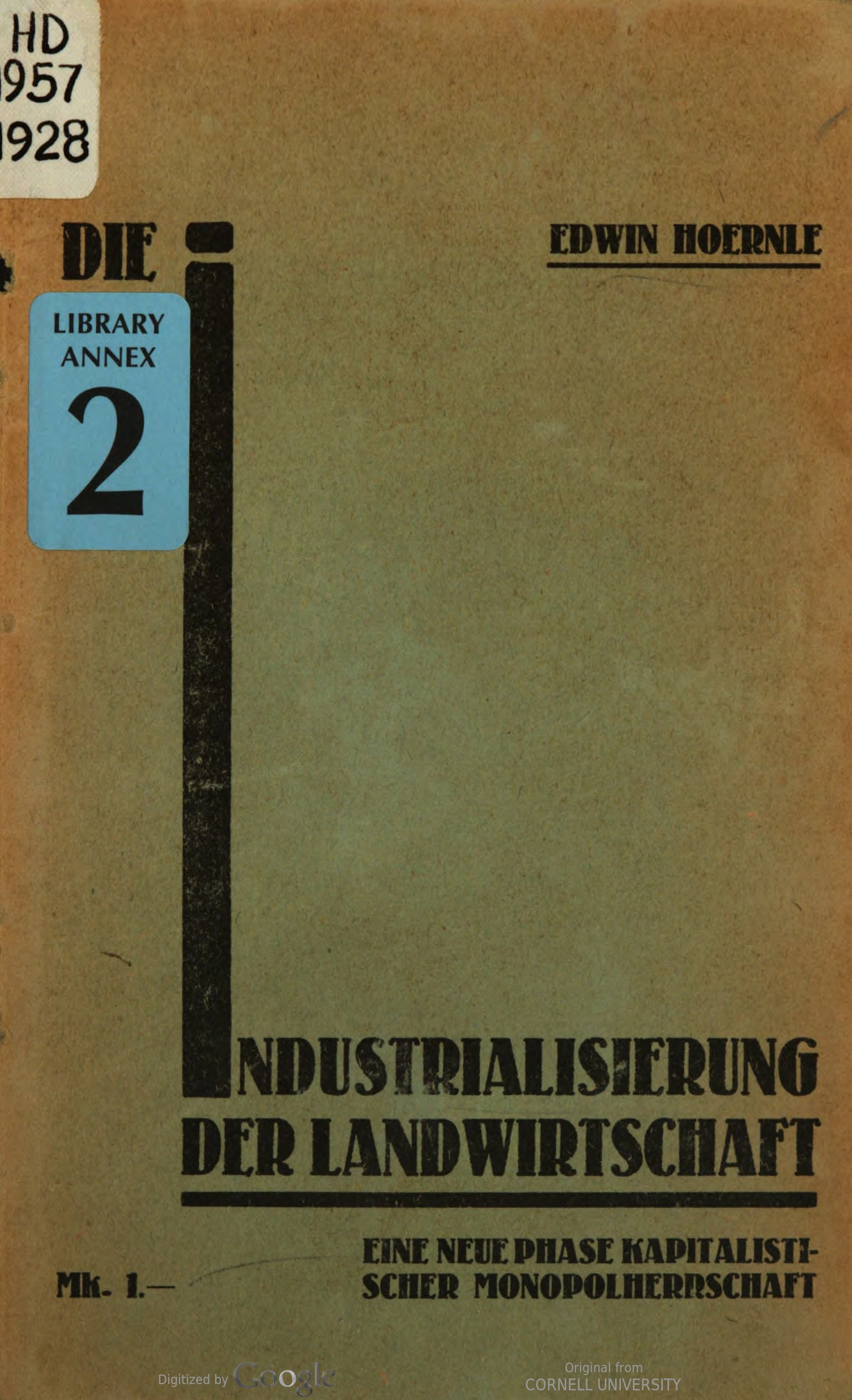
The cover of Hoernle's Die Industrialisierung der deutschen Landwirtschaft (1928)

From 1925 Edwin Hoernle, together with his comrade Heinrich Rau, returned to work in the party's Agriculture Department, working on an agricultural policy which in some respects would be played out after 1945 in the Soviet occupation zone of postwar Germany. One of Hoernle's colleagues was Ernst Putz, who was not yet a party member. (He joined in 1926.) Putz was a working farmer who won widespread respect, since along with Hoernle he was one of the few people in a position to combine an influence on Communist Party policy with a deep knowledge of agriculture. He also undertook several missions to the Soviet Union with delegations of farmers, keen to acquire and share knowledge about what might become, from the Communist perspective, the future of farming. During 1927 and 1928 the party moved Hoernle back to Stuttgart to take charge at the Süddeutsche Arbeiterzeitung (a regional party newspaper). Although there was necessary party work to be undertaken in Stuttgart, there are suggestions that it also suited the party leadership to send him away from Berlin because of the increasing vehemence with which he had been participating in disagreements within the leadership. After 1929, with the Stalinist Ernst Thälmann imposing the uncompromising Soviet approach to party strategy, Edwin Hoernle's own influence with the party leadership continued to decline. Hoernle was no admirer of the Social fascism concept which asserted that Social Democrats were the class enemy and there could be no question of co-operating with them to resist the rising tide of National Socialist populism. Nor did he back the RGO strategy for planning to use the trades union movement as a vehicle for taking power by force from Germany's "bourgeois" political parties.

In 1931 Edwin Hoernle was a co-author of the KPD's "Farm Support Programme" ("Bauernhilfsprogramm" der KPD).

=== National Socialism and exile ===
After several years of parliamentary deadlock the National Socialists took power in January 1933. The Hitler government quickly transformed the country into a one-party dictatorship. Although the scale of the killings for which the regime would later be remembered was not yet something that most people could have imagined, it very quickly became apparent that people identified as Jews and/or non-Nazi political activists were at heightened risk of persecution, arrest and worse. The aftermath of the Reichstag fire, which occurred at the end of February 1933, demonstrated that leading members of the (now outlawed) KPD were in particular danger. The speed with which leading communists were rounded up before or shortly after dawn directly after the fire had been reported triggered questions in the international press - never convincingly answered - over how the government came to be so well prepared to announce the identities of those to be blamed for it. Hoernle himself avoided arrest through what one source identifies as a happy coincidence. During the night in question he was out, safely hidden at the home of Hedda Ickert (1902-1989), the woman who at around this time became his second wife.

In April 1933, in obedience to a resolution of the party leadership, Hoernle fled to Switzerland: he engaged actively with the Communist Party there. By the end of 1933 he had made his way to Moscow, which was quickly becoming one of two informal headquarter locations for the exiled KPD.

Between December 1933 and November 1940 Hoernle was employed at the International Agriculture Institute in Moscow. Till 1935 he was deputy director of the Department for Central Europe and Scandinavia. Thereafter, for the next five years, he headed up the department. Meanwhile, his progress had not gone unnoticed back in Germany: his German citizenship was revoked in 1938. On a brighter note, there is no indication in the sources of his having been caught up in the Stalinist spy purges which peaked in 1938 and which interrupted or terminated the careers of many other high-profile political refugees from Hitler's version of Germany who had sought sanctuary in Moscow. It was also in 1938 that he received his doctorate in "Applied Economics" ("Wirtschaftswissenschaften") from the Soviet Academy of Sciences. In 1940 he became an academic researcher at the Institute for International Economics and Politics ("Institut für Weltwirtschaft u. Weltpolitik") at the Academy of Sciences. In 1941 his name was included on the Gestapo Sonderfahndungsliste ("Special Wanted List") of people to be sought out and dealt with in the event of the Soviet Union coming under German control. (The non-aggression agreement between the German and Soviet governments had broken down in June 1941 with the launch of a German invasion of the Soviet Union.) As the fighting drew closer to Moscow, in October 1941 Hoernle was among tens of thousands of evacuees sent to live in Tashkent. Here he taught and pursued research into Science and German History. By this time, back in Germany, he had been convicted 'in absentia' of high treason and sentenced to death. As the German military threat receded, Muscovites who had been evacuated to Tashkent were able to return to Moscow as the end of the war began to appear on the horizon. Although he was not himself a member of the core 30-man Ulbricht Group which were now engaged in a highly detailed planning exercise for a German "nation building" project, Hoernle did help with work on their programme, most notably in respect of agriculture and land use planning.

In 1943 Hoernle was one of those who successfully called for the creation of the National Committee for a Free Germany ("Nationalkomitee Freies Deutschland" / NKFD). He also made his own direct contribution as a teacher at the antifascist prisoner of war school in Oranki ("Gorky"/ Nizhny Novgorod).

=== After the war ===
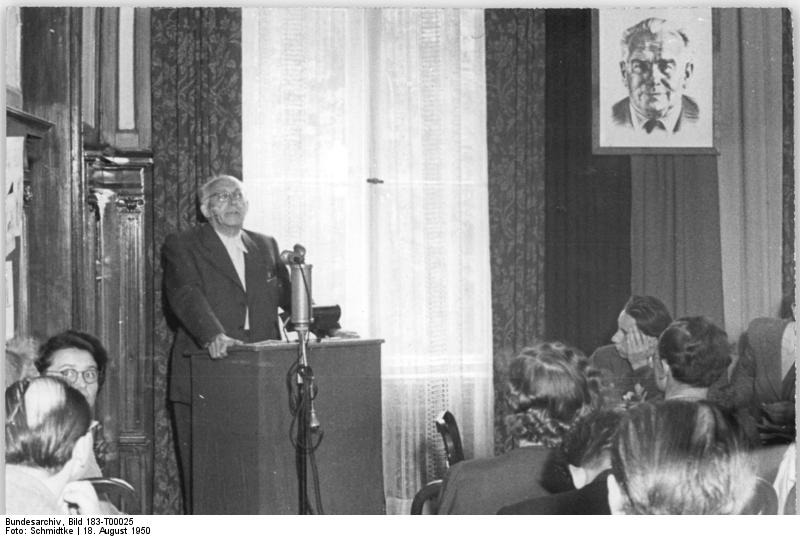
Edwin Hoernle speaking at the 1st Conference for Youth and Children's Literature, 1950

In May 1945 Edwin Hoernle returned from Moscow to (the previously central third of) Germany, which was now being administered as the Soviet occupation zone. (The zone would be relaunched in October 1949 as the Soviet sponsored German Democratic Republic.) In Berlin Hoernle was one of sixteen co-signatories of the Party Central Committee's appeal to the German people which was published on 11 June 1944, calling for the creation of an Antifascist-Democratic future. (Note: Call from the Central Committee of the Communist Party to the German People for the Creation of an Antifascist-Democratic Germany "Aufruf des Zentralkomitees der Kommunistischen Partei an das deutsche Volk zum Aufbau eines antifaschistisch-demokratischen Deutschlands")

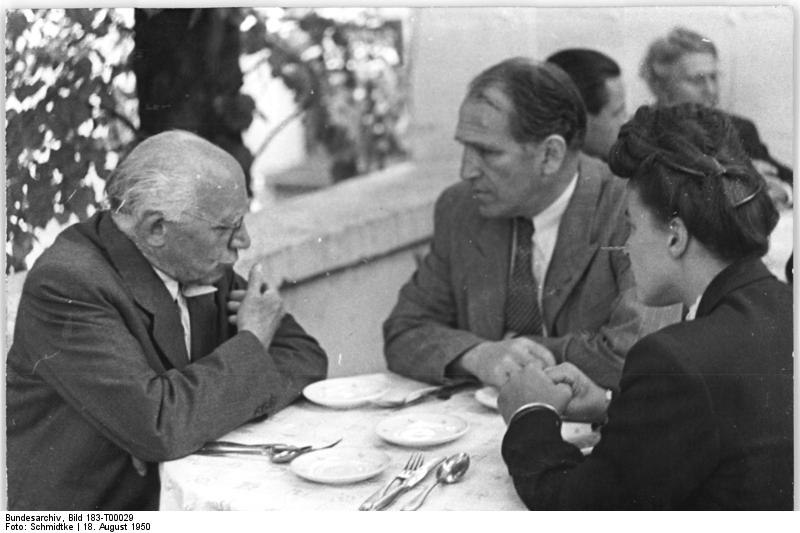
Edwin Hoernle (left) with the writer Michael Tschesno-Hell and the illustrator Ingeborg Meyer-Rey, 1950

Almost immediately on his arrival in Berlin the zone's military administrators appointed him vice-president of the administration for Brandenburg. As a more extensive administrative structure was established, on 15 August 1945 he became the zone's president of the committee of Agriculture and Forestry for the German Economic Commission, a role broadly equivalent to the Minister of Agriculture under a western-style civilian administration. He applied to be allowed to retire - almost certainly on genuine health grounds - early in 1948, but his resignation was accepted only in September 1949. He then accepted a less onerous posting as Dean of Faculty for Agriculture Policy at the German "Walter Ulbricht" Academy for Civil Jurisprudence (DASR) at Forst Zinna (in the countryside on the southern side of Berlin).

Edwin Hoernle died of heart failure, after a long period of illness, at a sanatorium in Bad Liebenstein, beyond Erfurt, in the extreme south of what had by now become the German Democratic Republic (East Germany).

== Personal tragedy ==
Edwin Hoernle's son by his first marriage, Alfred Hoernle, became a skilled factory worker and was also politically engaged. After 1933 he served (illegally) as the head of the local KPD on the sub-region of Berlin-Reinickendorf. He was arrested during 1936 and on 4 November 1937 sentenced to five years of imprisonment. According to testimonies provided by surviving fellow prisoners, Alfred Hoernle was suspected by comrades of having provided large amounts of information to the security services: while held in the Sachsenhausen concentration camp he was "hanged" by fellow prisoners. He seems to have survived that treatment, but was then starved to death.

== Publications (selection) ==
- Hinter den Kulissen einer königlichen Hofbühne. Ein Beitrag zur sozialen und wirtschaftlichen Lage der deutschen Bühnenkünstler. Schimmel, Stuttgart 1914.
- Aus Krieg und Kerker. Spartakus Verlag, Stuttgart-Degerloch 1918.
- Sozialistische Jugenderziehung und sozialistische Jugendbewegung. Verlag "Junge Garde", Berlin 1919.
- Die kommunistische Schule. Schulprogramm der Freien Sozialistischen Jugend Deutschlands (Entwurf). Verlag "Junge Garde", Berlin 1919.
- Die Oculi-Fabeln. Oskar Wöhrle, Stuttgart 1920.
  - Oculi. Eine Auswahl. Hrsg., Nachwort von Hansgeorg Meyer. Kinderbuchverlag, Berlin 1980.
- Der Jud’ ist Schuld [!]. Ein ernstes Wort an alle Kleinbauern, Häusler und Landarbeiter!. Berlin und Leipzig 1921. (Polemik gegen den Antisemitismus)
- Die Arbeiterklasse und ihre Kinder. Ein ernstes Wort an die Arbeitereltern. Internationaler Jugendverlag, Berlin 1921.
- Arbeiter, Bauer und Spartakus. Ein Bühnenspiel in einem Aufzug. Verlag "Junge Garde", Berlin 1921.
- Die Arbeit in dem Kommunistischen Kindergruppen. Verlag der Arbeiterbuchhandlung, Wien 1923.
- Rote Lieder. Gedichte. Verlag der Jugendinternationale, Wien 1924.
  - Rote Lieder. Gedichte. Dietz Verlag, Berlin 1963.
  - Das Herz muß schlagen. Mit einem Vorwort von Alexander Abusch. Aufbau-Verlag, Berlin und Weimar 1968.
- Die Industrialisierung der deutschen Landwirtschaft, eine neue Phase kapitalistischer Monopolherrschaft. Internationaler Arbeiter-Verlag, Berlin 1928.
- Grundfragen der proletarischen Erziehung. Verlag der Jugendinternationale, Berlin 1929.
  - Grundfragen der proletarischen Erziehung. Hrsg. von Lutz von Werder und Reinhart Wolff. März Verlag, Frankfurt am Main 1969.(=März Archi 5)
  - Grundfragen der proletarischen Erziehung. Hrsg. von Lutz von Werder und Reinhart Wolff. Fischer-Taschenbuch-Verlag, Frankfurt 1973. ISBN 3-436-01878-3.
- Bauern unterm Joch. Erzählung. Verlagsgenossenschaft Ausländischer Arbeiter in der UdSSR, Moskau 1936.
- Deutsche Bauern unterm Hakenkreuz. Editions Promethee, Paris 1939.
  - Deutsche Bauern unterm Hakenkreuz. Herausgegeben von Lothar Berthold und Dieter Lange. Akademie Verlag, Berlin 1983. (=Antifaschistische Literatur in der Bewährung. Band 6)
- Wilhelm Pieck, Edwin Hoernle: Demokratische Bodenreform;. Verlag Neuer Weg, Berlin 1945.
- Die Bodenreform. Ein Weg zu Demokratie und Frieden. Deutscher Bauernverlag, Berlin 1946.
- Die demokratische Bodenreform in der Bewährungsprobe. Dietz Verlag, Berlin 1947.
- Grundfragen der proletarischen Erziehung. Pädagogische und bildungspolitische Schriften. Ausgewählt und eingeleitet von Wolfgang Mehnert. Volk und Wissen, Berlin 1958.
- Ein Leben für die Bauernbefreiung. Das Wirken Edwin Hoernles als Agrarpolitiker und eine Auswahl seiner agrarpolitischen Schriften. Dietz Verlag, Berlin 1965.
- Der kleine König und die Sonne. Kinderbuchverlag, Berlin 1976.
