= List of members of the Zentrale of the Communist Party of Germany =

This list provides an alphabetically ordered overview of the members of the Zentrale (literally "Headquarters"), or Central Committee, of the Communist Party of Germany (KPD) elected at the Party Congresses (1918–1924). It was not until the 10th Party Congress of the KPD in July 1925 in Berlin that a Central Committee was elected as the governing body instead of the Zentrale (→ List of members of the Central Committee of the Communist Party of Germany).

== 1st Party Congress (1918/1919) ==
The founding Party Congress in Berlin (31 December 1918 – 1 January 1919) elected a Central Committee of twelve people:

- Hermann Duncker
- Käte Duncker
- Hugo Eberlein
- Paul Frölich
- Leo Jogiches
- Paul Lange
- Paul Levi
- Karl Liebknecht
- Rosa Luxemburg
- Ernst Meyer
- Wilhelm Pieck
- August Thalheimer

== 2nd Party Congress (1919) ==
At the second Party Congress in Heidelberg (20 – 24 October 1919) a Central Committee consisting of seven people was elected:

- Heinrich Brandler
- Hugo Eberlein
- Paul Frölich
- Paul Levi
- Ernst Meyer
- August Thalheimer
- Clara Zetkin

== 3rd Party Congress (February 1920) ==
The (illegally assembled) third Party Congress in Karlsruhe (25 – 26 February 1920) elected a Central Committee consisting of seven members and seven deputies:

Members:

- Heinrich Brandler
- Hugo Eberlein
- Paul Frölich
- Ernst Meyer
- Wilhelm Pieck
- August Thalheimer
- Clara Zetkin

Deputies (Candidates):

- Ernst Friesland (alias for Ernst Reuter)
- Arthur Hammer
- Fritz Heckert
- Joseph Koering
- Paul Lange
- Friedrich Schnellbacher
- Jacob Walcher

== 4th Party Congress (April 1920) ==
The (illegally assembled) fourth Party Congress in Berlin (14 – 15 April 1920) elected a Central Committee consisting of seven members and seven substitutes:

Members:

- Heinrich Brandler
- Hugo Eberlein
- Paul Levi
- Ernst Meyer
- Wilhelm Pieck
- August Thalheimer
- Clara Zetkin

Substitutes (Candidates):

- Ernst Friesland
- Paul Frölich
- Fritz Heckert
- Paul Lange
- Friedrich Schnellbacher
- Jacob Walcher
- Rosi Wolfstein

== 5th Party Congress (November 1920) ==
The delegates of the fifth Party Congress in Berlin (1 – 3 November 1920) confirmed the previous Zentrale.

== 6th Party Congress (December 1920) ==
The sixth Party Congress in Berlin (4 – 7 December 1920) was the unification congress of the KPD and the left wing of the USPD. The delegates elected an executive committee consisting of two chairmen, seven secretaries and five assessors.

Chairmen: Paul Levi (KPD) and Ernst Däumig (former USPD)

Secretaries:

- Heinrich Brandler
- Otto Brass
- Wilhelm Koenen
- Wilhelm Pieck
- Hermann Remmele
- Walter Stoecker
- Clara Zetkin

Assessors:

- Otto Gäbel
- Kurt Geyer
- Fritz Heckert
- Adolph Hoffmann
- August Thalheimer

== 7th Party Congress (1921) ==
The seventh Party Congress in Jena (22 – 26 August 1921) elected a Central Committee of 14 members:

- Paul Böttcher
- Bertha Braunthal
- Hugo Eberlein
- Ernst Friesland
- Fritz Heckert
- Edwin Hoernle
- Ernst Meyer
- Wilhelm Pieck
- Hermann Remmele
- Felix Schmidt
- August Thalheimer
- Jacob Walcher
- Rosi Wolfstein
- Clara Zetkin

== 8th Party Congress (1923) ==
The delegates of the eighth Party Congress meeting in Leipzig (28 January – 1 February 1923) elected a Central Committee of 21 members:

- Karl Albin Becker
- Paul Böttcher
- Heinrich Brandler
- Hugo Eberlein
- Arthur Ewert
- Paul Frölich
- Fritz Heckert
- Edwin Hoernle
- August Kleine
- Wilhelm Koenen
- Rudolf Lindau
- Hans Pfeiffer
- Wilhelm Pieck
- Hermann Remmele
- Felix Schmidt
- Georg Schumann
- Walter Stoecker
- August Thalheimer
- Walter Ulbricht
- Jacob Walcher
- Clara Zetkin

At a meeting of the Central Committee on May 17, 1923, four additional members were co-opted:

- Ruth Fischer
- Ottomar Geschke
- Artur König
- Ernst Thälmann

== 9th Party Congress (1924) ==
At the ninth Party Congress in Frankfurt am Main (7 – 10 April 1924) a Central Committee of 15 members was elected:

- Hugo Eberlein
- Ruth Fischer
- Wilhelm Florin
- Ottomar Geschke
- Fritz Heckert
- Iwan Katz
- Artur König
- Arkadi Maslow
- Wilhelm Pieck
- Hermann Remmele
- Arthur Rosenberg
- Ernst Schneller
- Werner Scholem
- Max Schütz
- Ernst Thälmann

== Sources ==
- Hermann Weber (Hrsg.): Der deutsche Kommunismus. Dokumente 1915–1945. 3. Auflage. Kiepenheuer & Witsch, Köln 1973, S. 425–434.
- Ben Fowkes (ed.): Communism in Germany under the Weimar Republic. MacMillan Press, London 1984, p. 206.
