= Jacob Walcher =

German communist politician and trade unionist

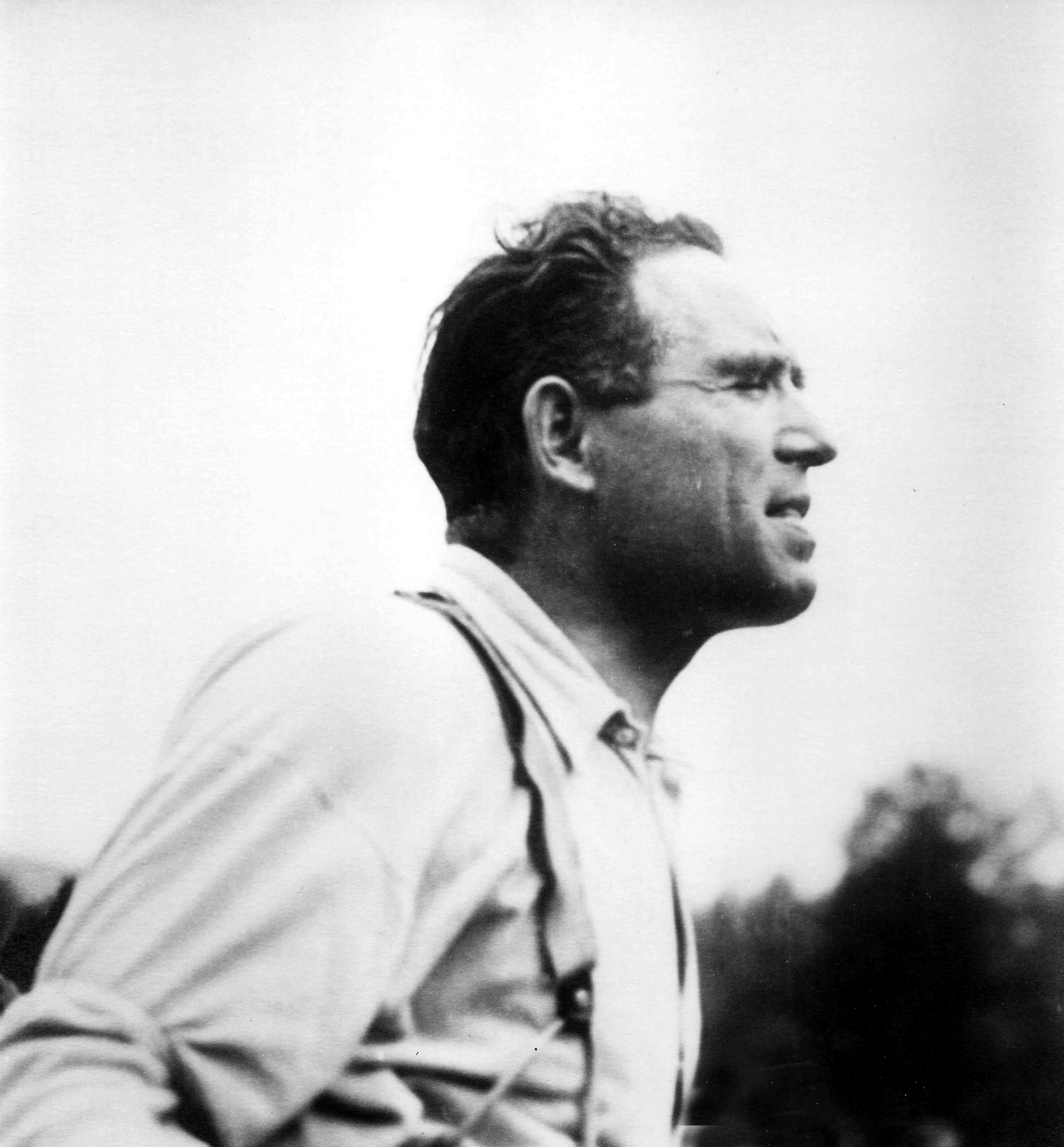
- Walcher in 1912

De facto Chairman of the Socialist Workers' Party of Germany
- In office March 1933 – April 1946
- Preceded by: Kurt Rosenfeld; Max Seydewitz
- Succeeded by: Position abolished

Personal details
- Born: May 7, 1887 Wain, German Empire
- Died: March 27, 1970 (aged 82) East Berlin, East Germany
- Resting place: Zentralfriedhof Friedrichsfelde, Berlin
- Party: SPD (1906–1914); Spartacus League (1914–1919); KPD (1919–1928); KPO (1928–1931); SAPD (1931–1946); SED (1946–1951)
- Spouse: Hertha Gordon (m. 1941)
- Awards: Patriotic Order of Merit in Gold (1967)
- Central institution membership: 1921–1923: Full member, KPD Politburo; 1920–1923: Full member, KPD Zentrale

Jacob Walcher (May 7, 1887 – March 27, 1970) was a German communist politician and trade unionist who was a co-founder of the Communist Party of Germany in 1919. Following policy disagreements, he was expelled from the party and eventually joined the Socialist Workers' Party of Germany, of which he served as de facto chairman-in-exile from 1933 until the formation of the Socialist Unity Party of Germany in 1946.

== Biography ==
=== Early life and Imperial years ===
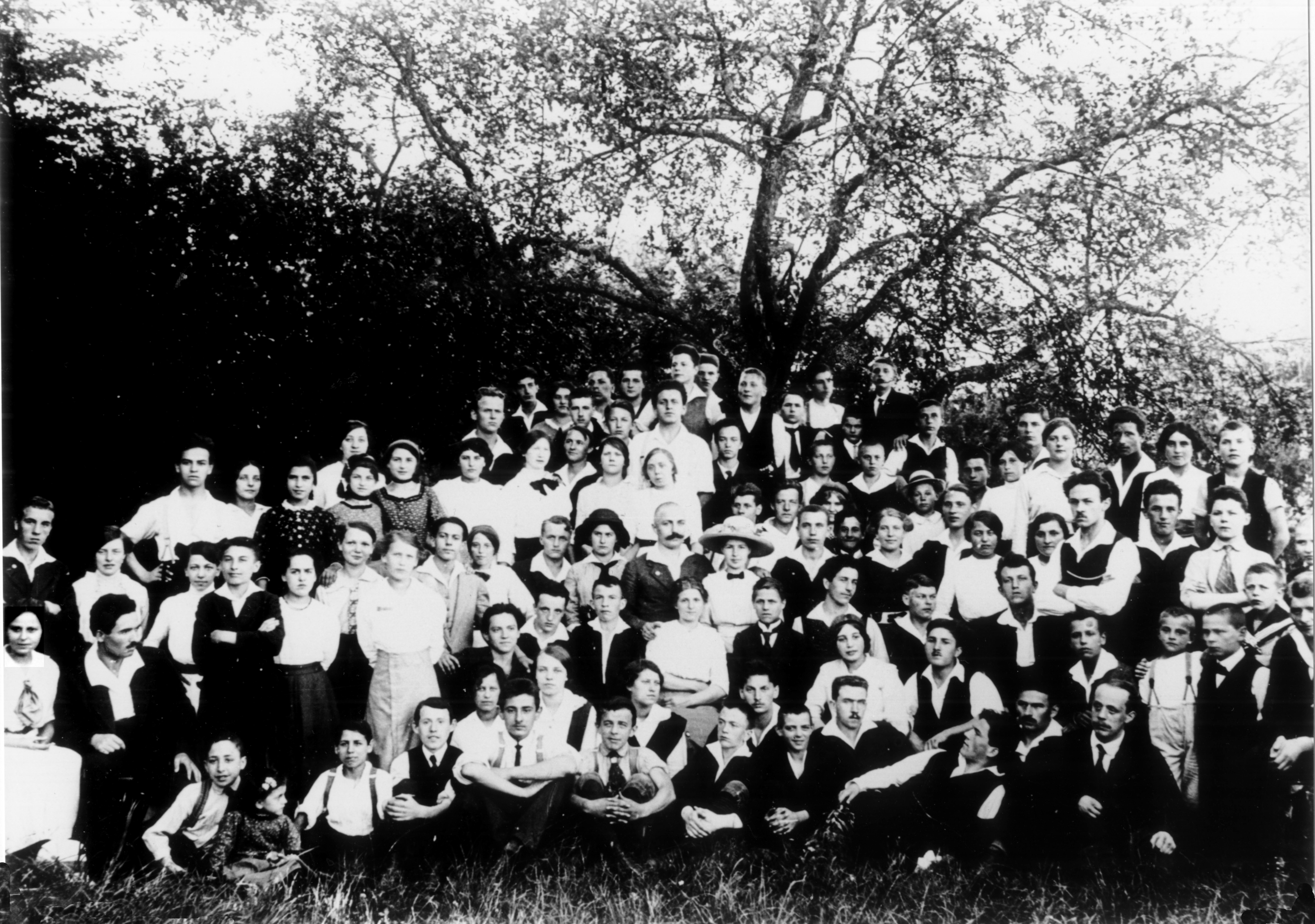
Free Socialist Youth, Stuttgart, 1909. Chairman Jacob Walcher is seated second from left.

Jacob Walcher was born on May 7, 1887, in the village of Wain in rural Upper Swabia to a family of poor religious Protestant farmers. There he attended the local elementary school. At the age of 15 he went to work as a turner for Daimler-Benz in Stuttgart and came into contact with the labor movement for the first time. He joined the German Metal Workers' Union (DMV) and the Social Democratic Party of Germany (SPD) in 1906. In Stuttgart he co-founded the Free Socialist Youth association, also known as "Free Youth". He was chairman of this left-wing social democratic workers' youth organization from 1906 to 1910. For several years he went to Käte and Hermann Duncker on weekends. There he was taught the basics of general and political education. After 1909 he was active in youth and workers' education. For this reason he often took part in political debates at the Waldheim Sillenbuch, an important center for the Stuttgart workers' movement. He also organized his own events there. In 1910 he was a delegate to the SPD party school in Berlin. Rosa Luxemburg taught there and encouraged him intellectually. He worked as an editorial member of the Stuttgart SPD newspaper Schwäbische Tagwacht from 1911 to 1914. He took on the role of district chairman of the DMV in 1913.

Walcher belonged to the circle of active opponents of the war around Friedrich Westmeyer and thus from 1914 onwards was one of the critics of the SPD's Burgfriedenspolitik. He was therefore removed from the editorial board of the Schwäbische Tagwacht together with his colleagues Arthur Crispien and Edwin Hoernle. He then joined the Spartacus League.

=== November Revolution and Weimar years ===
Near the end of World War I, Walcher was impressed by the October Revolution in Russia, hoping for a similar uprising of the German workers. Together with Karl Liebknecht and Rosa Luxemburg, he planned such a revolution. In December 1918, Walcher chaired the founding party conference of the Communist Party of Germany (KPD) together with Wilhelm Pieck and was a member of the executive committee of the Workers' and Soldiers' Council in Stuttgart. In 1919 he was political secretary of the KPD in Stuttgart and from 1919 to 1924 a member of the KPD central committee.

During the Weimar era, he was in regular contact with Clara Zetkin and during this time made the acquaintance of her secretary Hertha Gordon, whom he would later marry.

Walcher was a KPD delegate to the Second Congress of the Communist International, held in Moscow in July 1920, and the Congress of Communist and Revolutionary Organisations of the Far East also held in Moscow in 1922. The experienced trade unionist promoted the cooperation of communists in the social democratic unions, however he was unable to secure this position under pressure from Stalin. Walcher was a member of the executive of the Red Trade Union International in Moscow from 1924 to 1926 and then worked as a member of the trade union department of the KPD Central Committee until 1928, when he was expelled from the KPD.

As a founding member of the Communist Party of Germany (Opposition) (KPO), co-editor of the KPO magazine Gegen den Strom, and a member of the KPO's leadership between 1928 and 1931, he fought against the rising threat of fascism. Because he supported a merger with the Socialist Workers' Party of Germany (SAPD), he was expelled from the KPO together with Paul Frölich, August Enderle and Rosi Wolfstein. Within the SAPD, he became a full-time member of the party executive in 1932.

=== Nazi years and exile ===
When the Nazis came to power in 1933, Walcher fled abroad. Under the code name Jim Schwab, he led the SAPD in exile from Paris. He sent the young SAPD comrade Willy Brandt to Norway to do political work. In 1933 he held talks with Leon Trotsky near Paris to join the Fourth International, but their political differences were too great and the talks failed. In the Paris Lutetia Circle, Walcher campaigned for a united front of social democrats and communists against the Nazis. In April 1937, he was expatriated from the German Reich. When the Wehrmacht invaded France, he was arrested and interned twice. He was able to escape and received a visa for the United States through the Emergency Rescue Committee. His escape route, like that of many German emigrants, led over the Pyrenees to Lisbon and by ship to the U.S., where Walcher worked again as a turner.

Walcher's apartment was in the Bronx, in New York City. On May 13, 1941, he married Hertha Gordon. In the Council for a Democratic Germany under the leadership of theologian Paul Tillich (in which Bertolt Brecht also worked), Jacob Walcher drew up proposals for trade union work in Germany once the Nazis fell.

=== GDR years and political ostracism ===
In 1946, Walcher returned to Germany. As a socialist, he chose the Soviet occupation zone, where he first rejoined the KPD and then the newly-founded Socialist Unity Party of Germany (SED). During this time, he broke with his friend Willy Brandt because the latter rejoined the SPD in West Germany.

As editor-in-chief of the trade union newspaper Tribüne (1946–1949), Walcher criticized abuses in the GDR's "real socialism", which cost him his job in February 1951.

In April 1951, he was called before the Berlin State Review Commission of the SED, which was part of the Central Party Control Commission. He was accused–in Stalinist fashion–of a leading role in the KPO and SAPD, contacts with Leon Trotsky and his role as an alleged "counter-revolutionary" of the planned revolution of 1923 that never took place. In a resolution of April 29, 1951, the SED declared him the "worst enemy of the working class", expelled him from the party and demoted him to an archive worker. During the years of political ostracism, his friend Bertolt Brecht remained loyal to him.

In 1956, Walcher was formally rehabilitated and was officially considered a "trade union veteran" in the GDR, but only received secondary awards from the GDR, such as the Fritz Heckert Medal of the Free German Trade Union Federation (FDGB) or the Patriotic Order of Merit in Bronze in 1962. On Walcher's 75th birthday, Neues Deutschland printed an insignificant report on the second page, and this was repeated on his 80th birthday, although he did receive the Patriotic Order of Merit in Gold in 1967. Until his death in 1970, he lived a secluded life with his wife Hertha in Berlin-Hohenschönhausen. After Walcher's death, she refused (successfully) to give his entire estate to the Institute for Marxism-Leninism for the Central Committee of the SED.

Walcher's urn was buried in the Pergolenweg grave complex of the Berlin Zentralfriedhof Friedrichsfelde by decision of the Central Committee of the SED. However, the obituary of the Central Committee was worded in such a way that it was easy to see that Walcher should be erased from the SED's party memory. Not only his chairmanship together with Wilhelm Pieck at the founding party conference of the KPD, but also his election as a member of the Central Committee of the KPD in 1919 remained unmentioned.

His “red trade union book” from 1932 is still regarded today as an important contemporary document of a united front policy with the Social Democrats against the emerging Nazism.

== Works ==
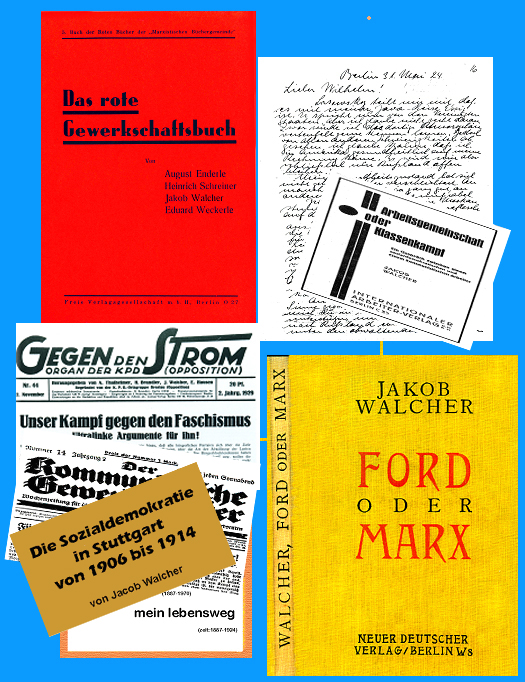
Various writings by Jacob Walcher

- Ford oder Marx. Die praktische Lösung der sozialen Frage. Berlin 1925. (Online at the Internet Archive)
- Arbeitsgemeinschaft oder Klassenkampf. Berlin 1928.
- Das rote Gewerkschaftsbuch. Berlin 1932. (Mitverfasser, mit August Enderle, Heinrich Schreiner, Eduard Weckerle, Online at the website of the Gruppe Arbeiterpolitik)
- Auf der falschen Seite. Ein überarbeiteter Vortrag des Chefredakteurs der Tribüne vor dem Personal des Aussenministeriums der Deutschen Demokratischen Republik über das Thema: Gewerkschaften in den kapitalistischen Ländern. Berlin 1950.
- Zum II. KI-Kongreß delegiert. In: Beiträge zur Geschichte der Arbeiterbewegung. Berlin 1970.

Unpublished book manuscripts:

- Die Sozialdemokratie in Stuttgart von 1906 bis 1915 (online)
- Unsere Gewerkschaftsarbeit vom Beginn bis 1924 (online)
- Mein Lebensweg, Autobiografie (Zeit 1887–1920) (online)

== Literature ==
- Ernst Stock, Karl Walcher: Jacob Walcher (1887–1970): Gewerkschafter und Revolutionär zwischen Berlin, Paris und New York. Trafo-Verlag, Berlin 1998. ISBN 3-89626-144-4.
- Bernd-Rainer Barth: Walcher, Jacob. In: Wer war wer in der DDR? 5. Ausgabe. Band 2. Ch. Links, Berlin 2010, ISBN 978-3-86153-561-4.
- Siegfried Mielke, Stefan Heinz (Hrsg.): Emigrierte Metallgewerkschafter im Kampf gegen das NS-Regime (= Gewerkschafter im Nationalsozialismus. Verfolgung – Widerstand – Emigration, Bd. 3). Metropol Verlag, Berlin 2014, ISBN 978-3-86331-210-7, S. 47, 149 ff., 151 ff., 635, 645, 847 f. (Kurzbiographie).
- Mario Keßler: Westemigranten. Deutsche Kommunisten zwischen USA-Exil und DDR., Böhlau Verlag Köln, Göttingen, 2019, ISBN 978-3-412-50044-3.
- Walcher, Jacob, in: Werner Röder, Herbert A. Strauss (Hrsg.): Biographisches Handbuch der deutschsprachigen Emigration nach 1933. Band 1: Politik, Wirtschaft, Öffentliches Leben. München: Saur 1980, S. 788.
- Regina Scheer: Bittere Brunnen. Hertha Gordon-Walcher und der Traum von der Revolution (Penguin Verlag), München, 2023, ISBN 978-3-328-60208-8.
- Jacob Walcher. In: Deutsche Biographie (Übersicht).
