= Paul Frölich =

German journalist (1884–1953)

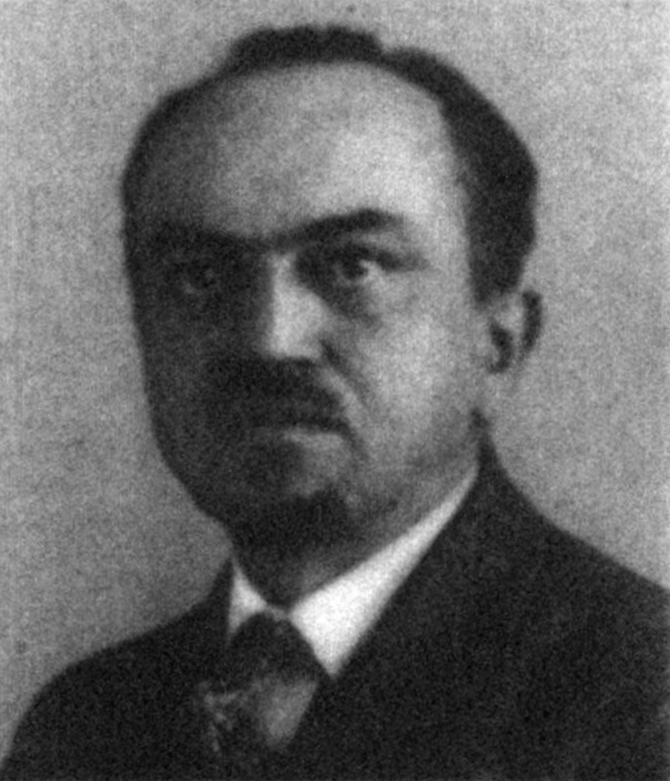
- Frölich c. 1928

Member of the Reichstag for Leipzig
- In office 20 May 1928 – 14 September 1930
- Preceded by: Multi-member district
- Succeeded by: Multi-member district
- In office 7 March 1921 – 5 January 1925
- Preceded by: Constituency established
- Succeeded by: Multi-member district

Personal details
- Born: 7 August 1884 Leipzig, Kingdom of Saxony, German Empire
- Died: 16 March 1953 (aged 68) Frankfurt, West Germany
- Party: SPD (1902–1918); KPD (1919–1928); KPD(O) (1928–1932); SAPD (1932–1933)
- Other political affiliations: IKD (1918)
- Spouse: Rosi Wolfstein (m. 1948)
- Children: Edda
- Occupation: Journalist; Activist; Politician

Military service
- Allegiance: German Empire
- Branch/service: German Imperial Army
- Years of service: 1914; 1916–1918
- Battles/wars: World War I; Eastern Front
- Central institution membership: 1919–1920, 1921–1924: Full member, KPD Zentrale

Paul Frölich (7 August 1884 – 16 March 1953) was a German journalist and author. As a left-wing political activist, he was a founding member of the Communist Party of Germany (KPD) and founder of the party's paper, Die Rote Fahne. A KPD deputy in the Reichstag on two occasions, Frölich was expelled from the party in 1928, after which he joined the organized German Communist Opposition movement. Frölich is best remembered as a biographer of Rosa Luxemburg.

== Biography ==
=== Early years ===
Paul Frölich was born 7 August 1884 in Leipzig into a German working-class family. He was the second child of eleven. As a young man, he studied history and social science at the Leipzig Workers' School. Frölich joined the Social Democratic Party of Germany (SPD) in 1902. He had a daughter with Louise Hoppe, Edda, who was born on 5 August 1922.

=== Political career ===
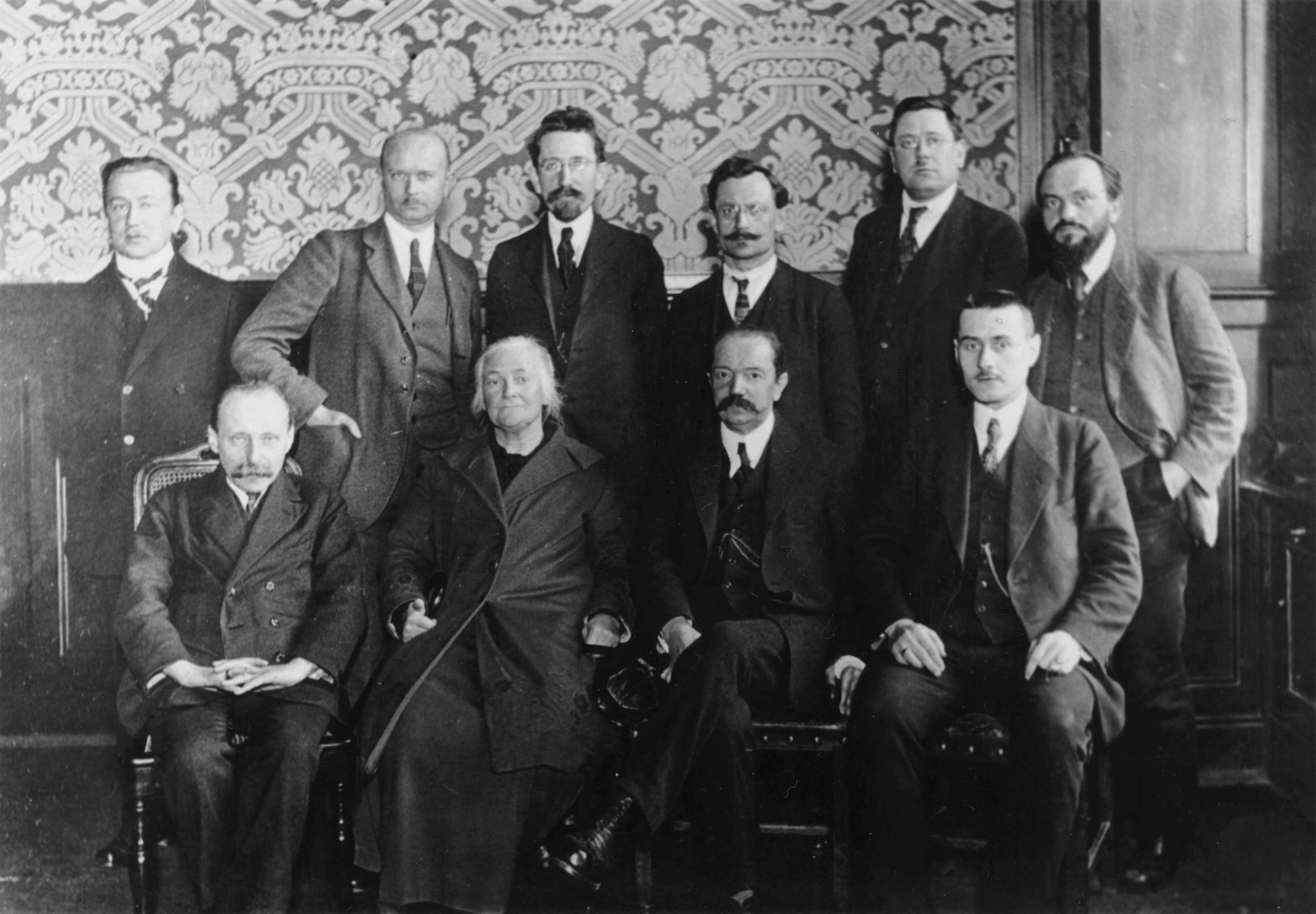
Members of the Reichstag faction of the KPD c. 1921. Sitting from left to right: Joseph Herzfeld, Clara Zetkin, Emil Eichhorn, Georg Berthelé. Standing from left to right: Max Heydemann, Walter Stoecker, Wilhelm Koenen, Wilhelm Bartz, Heinrich Malzahn, Paul Frölich.

Frölich worked as a journalist during the first decade of the 20th century, writing for the Hamburger Echo from 1910 to 1914 and for the Bremer Bürgerzeitung from 1914 to 1916. In 1914, in the beginning of World War I, Frölich served for a short time in the German Army as an NCO until he was wounded in action and demobilized. From 1916 to 1918, Frölich and Johann Knief together edited a political weekly called Arbeiterpolitik (Worker's Politics), which emerged as the voice of revolutionary socialism in Bremen. Frölich was a representative of the Bremen left-wing at the April 1916 Kienthal Conference, a gathering of international socialists held at Kienthal, Germany.

In 1918, Frölich founded the newspaper Die Rote Fahne (The Red Flag) in Hamburg. This was later to become the official organ of the Communist Party of Germany (KPD), which Frölich helped to establish at the end of December 1918. During this period, Frölich sometimes wrote under the pseudonym "Paul Werner". The founding congress of the KPD elected Frölich to its governing Central Committee. He was re-elected to this position by the 1920 Congress of the KPD; at the end of the year, he was squeezed off the body as a result of a merger of that organization with the Independent Social Democratic Party of Germany (USPD).

Following the 1921 departure of a faction led by Paul Levi, Frölich rejoined the Central Committee of the KPD. Frölich was a delegate of the KPD to the 3rd World Congress of the Comintern, which was held in Moscow in the summer of 1921. Frölich was selected by the congress as the representative of the KPD to the Executive Committee of the Communist International (ECCI). Frölich was elected as a KPD deputy to the Reichstag, serving in that capacity from 1921 to 1924 and again in 1928. Frölich was expelled from the KPD in December 1928, ostensibly as a supporter of right-wing conciliation.

After his expulsion from the KPD, Frölich joined the Communist Party Opposition (KPD-O), and helped to establish the Socialist Workers' Party of Germany (SAP) in 1932. Following the rise to power of Adolf Hitler in 1933, Frölich was imprisoned, remaining in custody in Lichtenburg concentration camp until December of that year. Following his release, Frölich emigrated to France, settling in Paris in February 1934. Following the 1940 fall of France to the fascists, Frölich hurriedly emigrated again, this time to the United States, where he remained until after the conclusion of World War II.

=== Personal life and death ===
Frölich's life partner from the 1920s till his death was Rosi Wolfstein (1888-1987), a fellow communist. The two were formally married in 1948. Frölich returned to West Germany in 1950, where he spent the last years of his life. Frölich died on 16 March 1953 in Frankfurt. He was 68 years old at the time of his death. Frölich is best remembered as a pioneer biographer of the assassinated communist Rosa Luxemburg. His book about her, first published in German in 1938, has been translated into a number of languages, including Spanish, English, French, Italian, Slovenian, Korean, Greek, Hebrew, Japanese, and Portuguese. A new edition of this work appeared in English in 2010, published by the Chicago-based publisher Haymarket Books.

== Works ==
- Die Politik des Hamburger Arbeiterrats (The Politics of the Hamburg Workers' Council). Berlin: G. Schumann, c. 1919.
- Keinen Pfennig den Fürsten! (Not a Penny for the Prince!) Berlin: Vereinigung Internationaler Verlagsanstalten, c. 1919.
- Der Weg zum Sozialismus (The Way to Socialism). Hamburg: Kommunistische Arbeiterzeitung, 1919.
- Die Bayerische Räterepublik. Tatsachen und Kritik (The Bavarian Soviet Republic: Facts and Criticism). Leipzig: Franke, 1920.
- Taktik und Organisation der revolutionären Offensive: Die Lehren der März-Aktion (Tactics and Organization of the Revolutionary Offensive: Lessons of the March Action). Leipzig : Frankes Verlag, 1921.
- Wider den weissen Mord (Against the White Murder). Berlin: Vereinigung Internationaler Verlagsanstalten, 1922.
- Der Steuerbote nimmt dein Brot! Ein Kapitel indirekte Steuern (The Tax Collector Takes Your Bread! A Chapter on Indirect Taxes). Berlin: Vereinigung Internationaler Verlags-Anstalten, 1922.
- 1848: Ein Lesebuch für Arbeiter (1848: A Reading Book for Workers). Berlin : Vereinigung Internationaler Verlags-Anstalten, 1923.
- 10 Jahr Krieg und Bürgerkrieg (Ten Years of War and Civil War). Berlin: Vereinigung Internationaler Verlags-Anstalten, 1924. —Memoir.
- Die deutsche Sozialdemokratie: 14 Jahre im Bunde mit dem Kapital (German Social Democracy: 14 Years in League with Capital). With A. Schreiner. Berlin: 1925.
- "Introduction" to Speeches of Georges Jacques Danton. New York: International Publishers, 1928.
- Rosa Luxemburg: Her Life and Work. [1928] Edward Fitzgerald, trans. London: Victor Gollancz, 1940.
- Illustrierte Geschichte der deutschen Revolution (Illustrated History of the German Revolution). Berlin: Internationalen Arbeiter-Verlag, 1929.
- In the Radical Camp: A Political Autobiography 1890-1921 (Im radikalen Lager: Politische Autobiographie 1890-1921, BasisDruck Verlag GmbH, 2013). Reiner Tosstorff, editor; David Fernbach, translator. Leiden: Brill, 2020.
