= Der Kämpfer =

Der Kämpfer ('The Fighter') was a German-language daily newspaper published in the Chemnitz-Zwickau area. Originally a newspaper connected to the Independent Social Democratic Party of Germany (USPD), it became an organ of the Communist Party of Germany in January 1919. The newspaper was suppressed on 2 May 1919 but reappeared the following year.
