= Heinrich Brandler =

German politician (1881–1967)

- Portrait by August Sander, 1931

Chairman of the Communist Party of Germany
- In office August 1922 – April 1924
- Preceded by: Ernst Meyer
- Succeeded by: Ruth Fischer; Arkadi Maslow
- In office February 1921 – August 1921
- Preceded by: Paul Levi; Ernst Däumig
- Succeeded by: Ernst Meyer

Personal details
- Born: 3 July 1881 Varnsdorf, Kingdom of Bohemia, Austro-Hungarian Empire
- Died: 26 September 1967 (aged 86) Hamburg, West Germany
- Party: SPD (1901–1916); USPD (1917–1918); KPD (1919–1928); KPD (O) (after 1929)
- Central institution membership: 1920–1924: Full member, KPD Politburo; 1919–1924: Full member, KPD Zentrale

Heinrich Brandler (3 July 1881 – 26 September 1967) was a German communist, trade unionist, politician, revolutionary activist, and political writer. Brandler is best remembered as the head of the Communist Party of Germany (KPD) during the party's ill-fated "March Action" of 1921 and aborted uprising of 1923, for which he was held responsible by the Communist International. Expelled from the Communist Party in December 1928, Brandler went on to become co-founder of the Communist Party of Germany Opposition, the first national section of the so-called International Right Opposition.

== Biography ==
=== Early years ===
Heinrich Brandler was born 3 July 1881, to a social-democratic working-class family in Varnsdorf, Bohemia, then part of the Austro-Hungarian empire. Heinrich's father, Joseph Brandler, was a bricklayer by trade, and he taught his son the craft from an early age. After completing his elementary education, Heinrich traveled Europe for several years as a journeyman tiler and bricklayer.

Brandler was active in the German trade union movement from 1897. Early in his working career, Brandler was injured in a job-related accident which caused him to walk with a limp for the rest of his life.

=== Rise to political power ===
Brandler joined the Social Democratic Party of Germany (SPD) in 1901, while living in the city of Hamburg and taking an active part in the leadership of the construction workers' union there. In 1904 he moved to Bremen, where he remained through 1908 as an activist both in union and political affairs. Brandler associated with the left wing of the SPD and was sympathetic to the views of Karl Liebknecht, which often brought him into conflict with more cautious and temperate members of the party and union organizations.

From there, Brandler moved to Zürich, Switzerland, remaining there from 1908 to 1914. While in Switzerland, Brandler worked during the summer building season as a stonemason and further supplemented his income as a socialist lecturer and teacher.

Brandler returned to Germany in 1914, just prior to the outbreak of World War I, settling in Chemnitz as secretary of the building workers' union. Brandler was militant in his opposition to the war, joining the International Group of Rosa Luxemburg and Karl Liebknecht — factional activity which ran him afoul of the SPD leadership and ultimately led to his expulsion from the SPD in 1915, along with Fritz Heckert. Brandler was named the delegate of the International Group to the first Zimmerwald Conference but was stopped by the police at the Swiss border and was unable to attend.

On 1 January 1916, Brandler was a founding member of the Spartacist League, the formal organization springing from the already-existing International Group.

In October 1918, Brandler was arrested for illegal political activities and was temporarily deported from Germany, owing to his Austrian citizenship. He subsequently obtained German nationality status through Gerhard Eisner's government in Bavaria, which allowed his return. Brandler was a founding member of the Communist Party of Germany (KPD) in December of that same year. He was elected to the party's National Committee at the organization's 2nd Congress, held in 1919. Brandler thus became one of the few members of the working class itself in the active leadership of the German Communist Party.

Home in Chemnitz, Brandler established a communist newspaper called Der Kämpfer (The Fighter) and helped build a powerful local unit of the KPD. He organized workers' councils in Chemnitz immediately after the failure of the ultra-nationalist Kapp Putsch of 1920. On 15 March 1920, Brandler and other Chemnitz communists joined the local social democrats in proclaiming a Soviet government for common defense against the nationalists. This proved to be an ephemeral institution which faded away after a few days when the generals and their government were ousted from Berlin.

He was elected to the governing executive body of the KPD in 1920 and reported to the party's Unification Congress on organizational matters later that year.

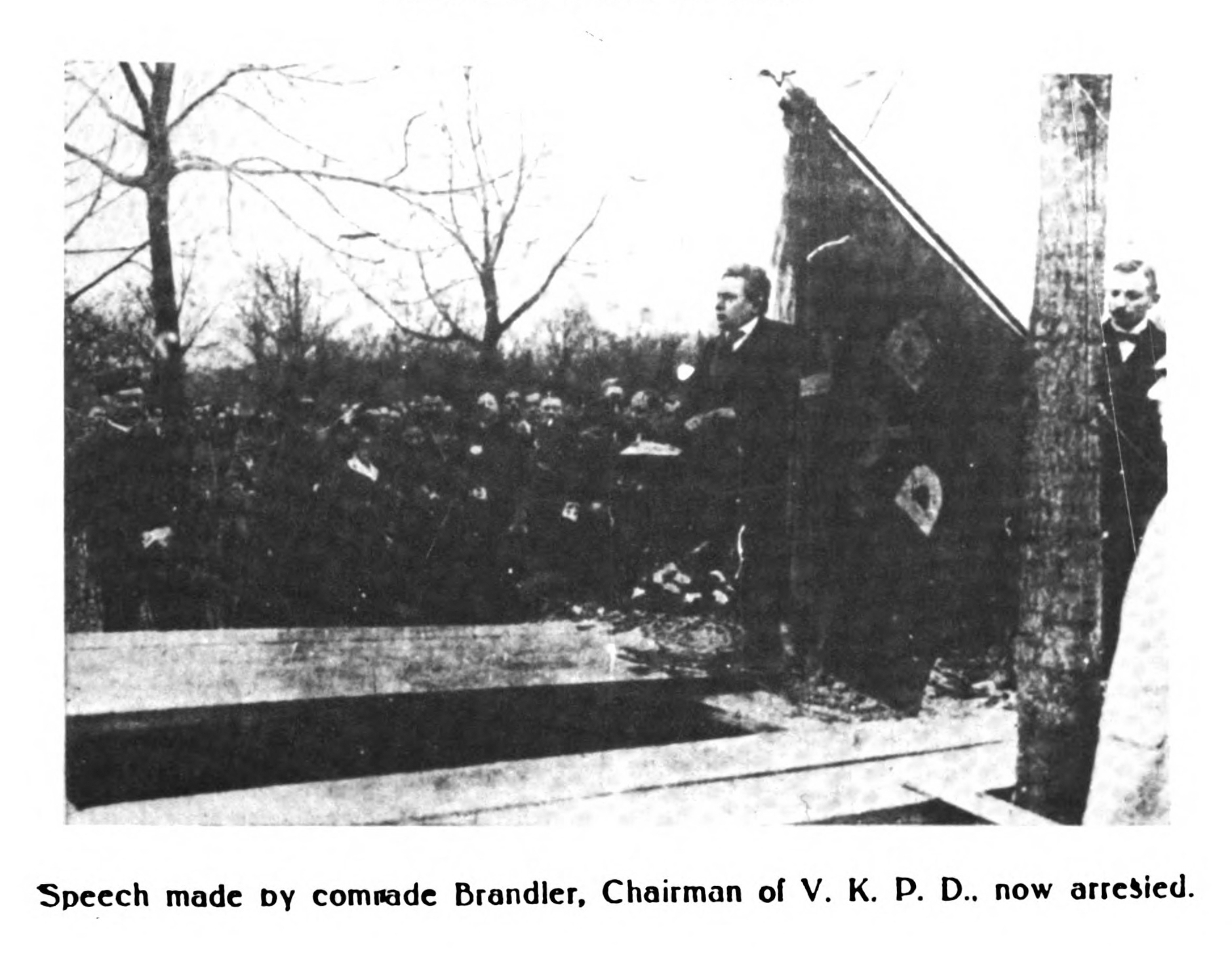
Communist International, September 1921

Aided by Comintern pressure, Brandler's faction took over leadership of the KPD in 1921, with Brandler replacing Paul Levi as KPD Chairman in February. Brandler was leader of the party during the KPD's ill-fated "March Action" of 1921, a role which placed him on a collision course with civil authorities following the failure of the uprising. In June 1921, Brandler was convicted in a treason trial and sentenced to five years' imprisonment in a fortress. The term was ended abruptly in November of that same year, after which Brandler left for Moscow, where he sat on the Executive Committee of the Communist International (ECCI) on behalf of the German party. Brandler was elected to the ECCI Presidium at its First Enlarged Plenum in February 1922. Brandler was also active in the affairs of the Red International of Labor Unions (Profintern) during this interval.

=== Role in the failed 1923 revolution ===
Brandler returned to Germany in the August 1922, assuming once again the role of top leader of the German Communist Party, a position temporarily held by factional ally Ernst Meyer. Brandler, August Thalheimer, and the KPD "Right" were soon at odds with the party's left wing, chiefly over the issues of the united front and the role of the communists in coalition governments. With respect to the united front, Brandler sought common cause not only with the rank and file but also with the leadership of other workers' parties, while the Left sought to implement a so-called "united front from below" by seeking to work with rank and file members in an attempt to turn them against their leaders. With respect to coalition government, Brandler and the Right deemed it permissible for the Communist Party to enter regional coalition governments with the Social Democrats, while the Left declared that any government not dominated by the Communist Party was unworthy of KPD participation.

At the 8th Congress of the KPD, held in Leipzig on 28 January 1923, Brandler and Thalheimer's faction prevailed over the KPD Left, a group led by Ernst Thälmann, Arkadi Maslow, and Ruth Fischer. Brandler's faction was the beneficiary of key support from Karl Radek, a top leader of the Communist International. Brandler's position as head of the KPD was solidified and his tactical interpretation of the united front and coalition "workers' government" was affirmed.

The left wing of the KPD believed that a revolutionary situation existed in Weimar Germany in 1923 and anxiously pushed for the setting of a date for a general uprising on the Russian Bolshevik model. While giving support to this general idea in the party's councils, in private Brandler seems to have felt that Germany was not yet ripe for a revolution and he sought additional time to win a greater percentage of the German working class to the idea. In September 1923, Brandler returned to Moscow for consultations. At a secret meeting of the Politburo of the Russian Communist Party it was decided, at the insistence of Leon Trotsky, to set 7 November 1923 — the sixth anniversary of the Bolshevik Revolution — as the date for the German uprising. Brandler refused to accept the setting of this artificial future date, however, winning agreement that the final date of the uprising should be left to the German Communists themselves.

Brandler returned to Germany with plans for revolution in the offing. In Saxony the Social Democrats governed thanks to supporting votes by Communist delegates in the Landtag. It was understood that the Communists could claim a share of the ministerial portfolios if they so desired. Following Brandler's return, the Communist Party decided to exercise this option, doing the same in Thuringia, where a similar situation existed. It was hoped that the Communists' place in the government would prove useful in course the forthcoming armed uprising. Negotiations began for entry of the Communists into the government. Brandler remained reluctant to set the final date for the revolution, however, arguing that the time was still not ripe and that the masses remained to be mobilized.

On 1 October 1923, a telegram signed by Comintern President Grigory Zinoviev on behalf of the ECCI was dispatched to the national committee of the German Communist Party declaring that by its estimate "the decisive moment will come in four, five, six weeks." The Communists were directed to "carry out at once the arming of 50,000 to 60,000 men." This proved to be a fanciful estimate, however, as the party possessed no more than 11,000 rifles and the bulk of its armed forces were far away from Saxony, where the proposed uprising was to be centered.

Exacerbating their weak numbers in terms of men and material, the Communists faced a substantial contingent of Reichswehr, with superior training and armaments, as well as illegal right wing militias. The number of purported sympathizers among the regular officers corps was greatly exaggerated, as was the degree of support for the Communist project among the working class itself.

In 1923, Brandler was responsible for calling off a planned revolutionary uprising following the defection of left-wing Social Democrats from the revolutionary group. An ill-fated uprising continued in Hamburg, conducted when workers were not properly informed of the cancellation of the revolt. Brandler and his close associate August Thalheimer were largely blamed for this debacle by the Comintern and his career as leader of the German Communist movement was effectively ended. He was recalled to the Soviet Union by the Comintern in January 1924, and he remained that country for the best part of the next four years.

The disgraced Brandler was sent on a party task to Kazakhstan in Soviet Central Asia, where he remained until being partially restored to the Comintern's good graces sometime in 1926. This respite proved to be short-lived. Brandler and his associates were harsh critics of new German Communist Party leader Ernst Thälmann, an individual stoutly supported by the ever more powerful Russian Communist Party leadership. Brandler again became the object of harsh criticism for factional activity at the 7th Enlarged Plenum of ECCI in the winter of 1926, ending with a specific prohibition of his continuing further work in the German Communist Party.

=== Expulsion and communist oppositional activities ===
Cover of Gegen den Strom, official publication of the "Brandlerite" Communist Party of Germany (Opposition).

In the fall of 1928, an event (Wittorf affair) took place in the Communist Party of Germany which ultimately led to the final break of Brandler and Thalheimer and their supporters. The secretary of the Hamburg organization of the KPD was found to have embezzled 2,000 marks from the party treasury for his own use. When accountants from national party headquarters discovered the crime, they had been threatened with expulsion from the party by party leader Thälmann if they exposed the theft. The Comintern got wind of the scandal which led to a crisis in the German party with the Central Committee acting to remove Thälmann, with Thälmann joining in the unanimous vote.

This presented a threat to the faction of the Communist Party of the Soviet Union headed by Joseph Stalin, who saw in Thälmann a reliable ally during a time of bitter factional warfare. As a result, the Presidium of the Comintern countermanded the German Central Committee's action, restoring Thälmann as secretary.

In October 1928, Brandler returned to Germany against the KPD's wishes. The corruption of Thälmann's Hamburg organization and its protection by the Stalin faction in Moscow was used as a pretext for Brandler and Thalheimer to issue a call for a meeting of their followers on 11 November 1928.

The Comintern, predictably, reacted with fury. Brandler, Thalheimer, and their associates were bitterly criticized in an open letter from the Comintern on 19 December 1928. Expulsion soon followed, with both Brandler and Thalheimer removed from the Communist Parties of Germany in December 1928 and from the Communist Party of the Soviet Union and the Communist International in January 1929.

Brandler and Thalheimer gathered their supporters into a new organization called the Communist Party of Germany (Opposition) (KPO), a group which was founded at the 30 December 1928, meeting which had originally prompted the wave of expulsions. The group also launched a new communist opposition journal, Gegen den Strom (Against the Current).

Throughout 1929, the KPD expelled followers of Brandler and Thalheimer, as well as so-called "conciliators" who sought a factional truce between the party's feuding Left and Right. Perhaps 1,000 members of the Communist Party of Germany were affected. These expulsions paralleled similar efforts to purge the Russian Communist Party of followers of Nikolai Bukharin, Alexei Rykov, and Mikhail Tomsky.

The KPO initially conceived of itself as a factional influence group, attempting to change the political line of the Communist Party of Germany rather than a new party in competition with it. The organization held a second conference in November 1929 at which it, in the words of M.N. Roy, "declared unequivocally that between Social Democracy and Communism there is no half-way house." Roy claimed that the KPO had 6,000 dues-paying members and was publishing eight weekly and bi-monthly publications by the fall of 1929, with a combined circulation of 25,000. Brandler was named Secretary of the organization at this time. While the group never met with broad influence or electoral success, it nevertheless became the first as well as one of the most prominent parties to be identified with the so-called "International Right Opposition."

On 1 January 1930, the KPO attempted to expand its influence even further with the launch of a daily newspaper, Arbeiterpolitik. Financial problems led it a reduction of frequency, however, and by 1932 the paper was being issued only once a week.

Despite Roy's protestations that the KPO did not constitute an independent political party, it was not long before it had entered the field with its own candidates for office. It ran its own candidates in the 7 December 1929, provincial election in Thuringia, one of the organization's strongholds, although these garnered only 12,000 votes. In other elections, it supported the slate of candidates of the official Communist Party of Germany, including the candidacy of Ernst Thälmann for President in the election of March 1932.

Brandler and the KPO were strongly in favor of the establishment of a united front against the menace of Nazism and were particularly critical of the Communist Party's conception that "once the Nazis get into power, then will the united front of the proletariat rise and brush them aside." Instead, the KPO called for the immediate formation of a broad anti-fascist alliance including the Social Democratic-controlled trade union federation, the Social Democrats, Communists, and the Socialist Workers' Party of Germany.

Following the rise to power of Adolf Hitler and his ultra-nationalist National Socialist German Workers Party on 30 January 1933, and the wave of repression which ensued, Brandler and most of the KPO leadership fled to France. Brandler lived in Paris until the beginning of World War II, where he continued to be involved in communist politics. In 1939 and 1940, Brandler was temporarily interned by the Vichy government and was sent to prison in the south of France. Brandler and Thalheimer fled to Cuba to avoid greater repercussions in 1941.

After Thalheimer's death in 1948, Brandler left Cuba for the United Kingdom, where he attempted to work on writing his memoirs, struggling at the project without success. In 1949 he was able to return to West Germany. Brandler became involved in a new radical opposition organization called the Labor Politics Group and served as its president and editor of its journal, Gruppe Arbeiterpolitik (Labor Policy Group), until 1956.

Brandler also corresponded extensively with Isaac Deutscher and aided Deutscher's research on German communism and the Right Opposition.

=== Death and legacy ===
Heinrich Brandler died on 26 September 1967. He was 86 years old at the time of his death. His organisation Gruppe Arbeiterpolitik exists today as one of the few surviving descendants of the Right Opposition current.

== Works ==
- Justiz und Rechtswesen: 2 Berichte aus Rußland. (Justice and Law: Two Reports from Russia.) Chemnitz: Der Kämpfer, n.d. [1919].
- Durch die Räte zur Einheit der Arbeiterklasse und zum Kommunismus. (Through the Councils to the Unity of the Working Class and to Communism.) Chemnitz: Der Kämpfer, n.d. [1919].
- Revolutionierung oder Verfall des Deutschen Bauarbeiterverbandes. (Revolutionization or Decline for the German Construction Workers' Union) Chemnitz: Deutscher Bauarbeiterverb., 1920.
- Rede : gehalten auf dem 1. Kongress der Betriebsräte der Gewerkschaften Deutschlands. (Speech: On the First Congress of Factory Councils of the Trade Unions of Germany.) Leipzig: Franke, 1920.
- Wer soll die Kriegsrechnung bezahlen? (Who Should Pay the War Bill?) Leipzig: Franke, 1920.
- Die aktion gegen Kapp-putsch in Westsachsen. (The Action against the Kapp Putsch in West Saxony.) Berlin: Berliner buch- und kunstdruckerei, 1920.
- Betriebsräte und politische Arbeiterräte: nebst Anhang Leitsätze über die Aufgaben der Betriebsräte, Organisation der Betriebsräte und Leitsätze für die politischen Arbeiterräte: Rede des Genossen Brandler auf dem 5. Parteitag der KPD (Spartakusbund) in Berlin, am 2. November 1920. (Factory Council and Political Workers' Council: Together with Supplemental Guidelines on the Tasks of the Factory Council and Guidelines for the Political Workers Council: Speech of Comrade Brandler to the 5th Party Congress of the KPD (Spartacusbund) in Berlin, 2 November 1920.) Berlin: Spartakusbund, 1920.
- Gewerkschaften und Betriebsräte: Referat des Genossen Brandler auf dem Vereinigungsparteitag im Dezember 1920 in Berlin. (Unions and Factory Councils: Report of Comrade Brandler at the Unification Congress of December 1920 in Berlin.) Berlin: Vereinigte Kommunistische Partei Deutschlands, 1920.
- Der Hochverrats-Prozeß gegen Heinrich Brandler vor dem außerordentlichen Gericht am 6. Juni 1921 in Berlin. (The Treason Trial of Heinrich Brandler before the Extraordinary Court), 6 June 1921, in Berlin.) Leipzig: Franke, 1921.
- War die Märzaktion ein Bakunisten-Putsch? (Was the March Action a Bakunist Putsch?) Leipzig: Franke, 1921.
- Gewerkschaften und Genossenschaften. (Unions and Cooperatives.) With Otto Schröder. Friedrichshagen: Allgemeiner Genossenschaftsverlag, 1924.
- Der Hessen-Streik und seine Lehren: die Aufgaben der klassenbewussten Gewerkschafter. (The Hesse Strike and Its Lessons: The Role of the Class-Conscious Trade Unionist.) Stuttgart: Bergmann, 1951.
- Zur weltpolitischen Lage: Artikel aus der Arbeiterpolitik, Jahrgänge von 1965 bis 1967. (On the International Situation: Articles from Arbeiterpolitik, from the Years 1965 to 1967.) Bremen: Gruppe Arbeiterpolitik, n.d. [c. 1967?].
- Unabhängige Kommunisten: der Briefwechsel zwischen Heinrich Brandler und Isaac Deutscher, 1949 bis 1967. (Independent Communists: The Correspondence between Heinrich Brandler and Isaac Deutscher, 1949–1967). With Isaac Deutscher. Berlin: Colloquium-Verlag, 1981.
- Die Sowjetunion und die sozialistische Revolution: 1950. (The Soviet Union and the Socialist Revolution: 1950.) Bremen: Gruppe Arbeiterpolitik, 1982.

== See also ==
- Right Opposition
- Communist Party Opposition
- August Thalheimer
