= Communism in Germany =

History of communist movements and parties in Germany

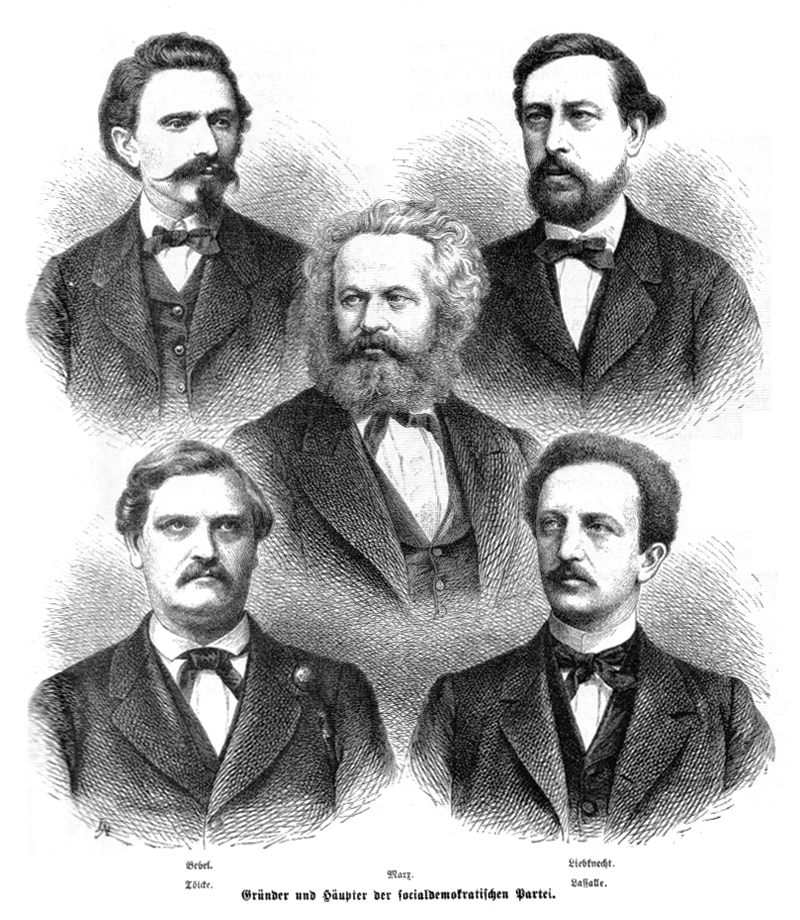
Protagonists of the early German workers' movement (Top row: August Bebel and Wilhelm Liebknecht for the SDAP. Middle: Karl Marx. Bottom row: Carl Wilhelm Tölcke and Ferdinand Lassalle for the ADAV)

The history of communism (Note: German: Kommunismus) in Germany spans from the mid-19th century to the present day, encompassing revolutionary movements, political parties, and governing regimes. Its roots lie in the radical wing of the Social Democratic Party of Germany (SPD), which, under the influence of Karl Marx and Friedrich Engels grew into the world's largest and most influential socialist party before World War I. The SPD's support for the war in 1914 caused a decisive split that led first to the formation of Spartacus League and ultimately to the founding of the Communist Party of Germany (KPD) in December 1918.

During the Weimar Republic, the KPD was the largest communist party in Europe outside the Soviet Union, polling consistently between 10 and 16 percent of the national vote. Its refusal to form a united front with the SPD against the rising Nazi Party, based on the Comintern doctrine of social fascism, is widely regarded as a catastrophic strategic failure that contributed to Adolf Hitler's ascent to power. After the Machtergreifung in 1933, the KPD was banned and brutally suppressed, with tens of thousands of its members executed or imprisoned.

Following World War II, Germany was divided along ideological lines. In the Soviet occupation zone, the KPD was forcibly merged with the SPD to form the Socialist Unity Party of Germany (SED), which ruled the German Democratic Republic (East Germany) as a one-party Marxist–Leninist state from 1949 until the Peaceful Revolution of 1989. In West Germany, the KPD was banned again in 1956; and a successor party, the German Communist Party (DKP), was founded in 1968, remaining a marginal fringe party throughout its existence. Since German reunification, the communist legacy has been carried forward primarily by Die Linke, a party formed in 2007 by a merger of the post-SED PDS and the western WASG.

== Origins: the workers' movement and the SPD ==
=== Early workers' organizations (1860s) ===
The intellectual foundations of German communism lay in the work of Karl Marx and Friedrich Engels (both German-born). Their work, The Communist Manifesto was first published in German in February 1848, and provided the theoretical basis for revolutionary socialism worldwide. The organized working-class movement emerged in the 1860s out of workers' educational associations (Arbeiterbildungsvereine) that had initially been non-political; drawing together artisans, liberal intellectuals, and industrialists. August Bebel, a turner who would eventually lead the socialist movement, first attended such an association in 1861.

In 1863, Ferdinand Lassalle split off to form the first independent workers' party, the Allgemeiner Deutscher Arbeiterverein (ADAV, General German Workers' Association), which advocated for direct manhood suffrage and furthered his theory of the "iron law of wages". Wilhelm Liebknecht, a veteran of the Revolutions of 1848 and a close associate of Marx and Engels', initially joined the ADAV. Liebknecht failed to win supporters to his position so entered the educational societies instead. A major point of dispute was the German question: The Lassalleans favored a Prussian-led "lesser" German unification, while Marx, maintaining contact through Liebknecht, advocated for a more democratic "greater" German republic united with Austria by a people's militia.

In 1869, supporters of August Bebel supporters gathered in Eisenach and founded the Sozialdemokratische Arbeiterpartei (SDAP, Social Democratic Workers' Party of Germany), also known as the "Eisenachers," which was aligned with the International Workingmen's Association. The SDAP merged with the Lassallean ADAV at Gotha in 1875, forming the Sozialistische Arbeiterpartei Deutschlands (SAP), later renamed the Social Democratic Party of Germany (SPD) in 1890. Karl Marx sharply criticised the compromise program agreed at Gotha in his Critique of the Gotha Program.

=== The SPD under Bismarck and the Erfurt Program ===
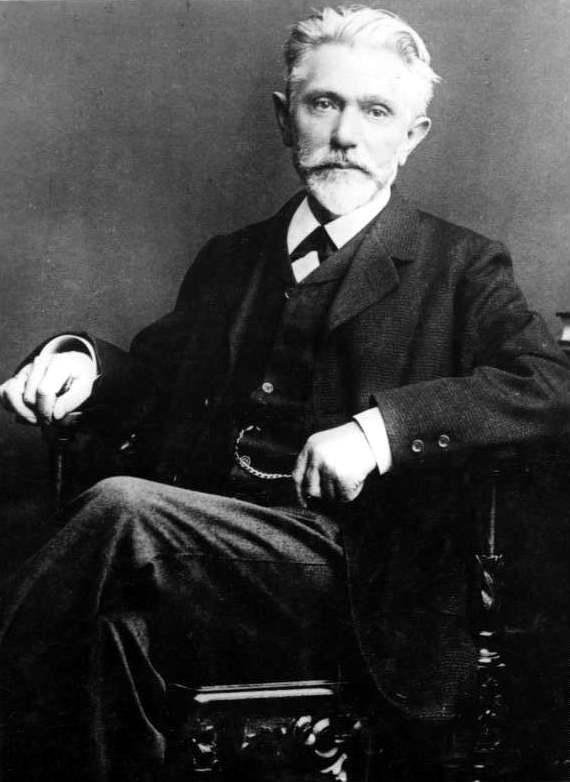
August Bebel in 1863, co-chairman of the SPD from 1892 to 1913

In 1878, Otto von Bismarck passed the Anti-Socialist Laws which outlawed the SPD until 1890. The SPD later referred to this period as its "heroic period," as membership and support grew steadily despite repression from the German Empire. After being legalised in 1890 and gaining seats in the 1890 German federal election, the party adopted the Marxist Erfurt Program in 1891. In 1891 the party officially became a Marxist party, to the satisfaction of the ageing Engels. Eduard Bernstein's revisionist arguments of the late 1890s held that socialist goals were achievable through reform rather than revolution. This revision marked the beginning of a permanent tension between the party's radical and reformist wings. Rosa Luxemburg attacked Bernstein's revisionism in her pamphlet Social Reform or Revolution, and his program was not adopted by the party.

By 1912, the SPD was the strongest party in the Reichstag, with over a million members and being considered the most successful socialist party at the time. The party, despite its revolutionary program, had in practice become reformist. They had managed to achieve tangible improvements in wages, working conditions, social insurance, and democratic rights through parliamentary and municipal action. The left wing, then led by figures such as Luxemburg and Wilhelm's son, Karl Liebknecht, maintained a more uncompromising internationalist position and grew increasingly estranged from the party's mainstream.

=== The 1914 split ===
Conservative elites were concerned by the growth of the SPD, especially after it won 35 percent of the national vote in the 1912 German federal election. The outbreak of World War I was a decisive turning point for the SPD. On 4 August 1914, the SPD's Reichstag group voted to support the war and the Burgfriedenspolitik was formed, a political truce under which the parties agreed to support the war and not criticise the government. Karl Liebknecht, despite being an antimilitarist, initially voted with the party in solidarity. Liebknecht broke ranks in December 1914 and voted against war credits, the first Reichstag deputy to do so.

Immediately following the 4 August vote, Rosa Luxemburg convened a meeting at her Berlin apartment with six trusted opponents of the war, including Hugo Eberlein, Wilhelm Pieck, Franz Mehring, and Ernst Meyer. This gathering formed the nucleus of the International Group (Gruppe Internationale), the forerunner of the Spartacus League. This group saw the SPD's approval of war credits as a betrayal of international proletarian solidarity and continued to organise anti-war activity within the party. Those who opposed the war, including Luxemburg, Liebknecht, and Hugo Haase, were eventually expelled from the SPD in 1917 and formed the Independent Social Democratic Party of Germany (USPD).

== The Spartacus League ==
=== Formation and activity ===
In 1916, the International Group renamed itself the Spartacus Group, and circulated illegal Spartacus Letters that detailed its anti-war program and being the origin for its name, evoking Spartacus, leader of the great slave rebellion against the Roman Republic. Karl Liebknecht was expelled from the SPD in January 1916 for his dissent; Otto Rühle resigned in solidarity. In April 1917, the Spartacus Group joined the newly formed USPD as an autonomous closed propaganda association, retaining its distinct identity while attempting to radicalise the USPD from within.

Rosa Luxemburg, writing from prison, welcomed the Russian October Revolution in principle while simultaneously criticised the Bolsheviks' suppression of democratic participation and their cadre-party model. This criticism of Bolshevism distinguished the Spartacists, at least initially, from the emerging Communist International.

=== The November Revolution and re-founding ===
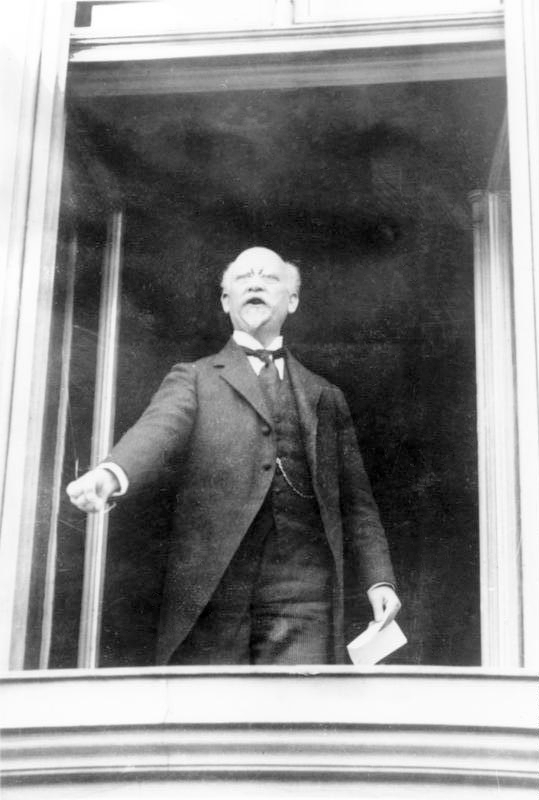
Philipp Scheidemann proclaiming the German Republic from the Reichstag, 9 November 1918

When Germany's military situation collapsed in late 1918, revolution swept the country. Soldiers and workers formed councils spontaneously across Germany without the initiative or leadership of any of the left-wing parties. On 9 November 1918, two republics were proclaimed: Philipp Scheidemann (MSPD) declared "the German Republic" from the Reichstag balcony, while Karl Liebknecht proclaimed "the free socialist republic of Germany" from the Berlin Palace around two hours later. On 11 November, the Spartacus Group reconstituted itself as the Spartacus League (Spartakusbund), a nationwide, party-independent organisation committed to establishing a socialist republic through the workers' and soldiers' councils.

Rosa Luxemburg's platform for the League demanded the disarming of the police and ruling classes, the arming of the proletariat, the socialisation of banks, mines and major industries, and contact with like-minded parties abroad to internationalise the revolution. In her essay What Does the Spartacus League Want?, published on 14 December 1918, Luxemburg emphasised that the League had no intention to take power, unless it was with the clear will of the majority of the proletariat, a conscious departure from the Bolshevik model of minority seizure of power.

At the Reich Congress of Workers' and Soldiers' Councils in December 1918, only ten of the 489 delegates represented the Spartacus League. Rosa Luxemburg and Karl Liebknecht were not even allowed to attend as guests. The majority of delegates voted to hold elections on 19 January 1919 for a constituent National Assembly, which a disappointed Luxemburg described as a "willing tool of the counterrevolution."

== Founding of the KPD ==
=== The founding congress ===
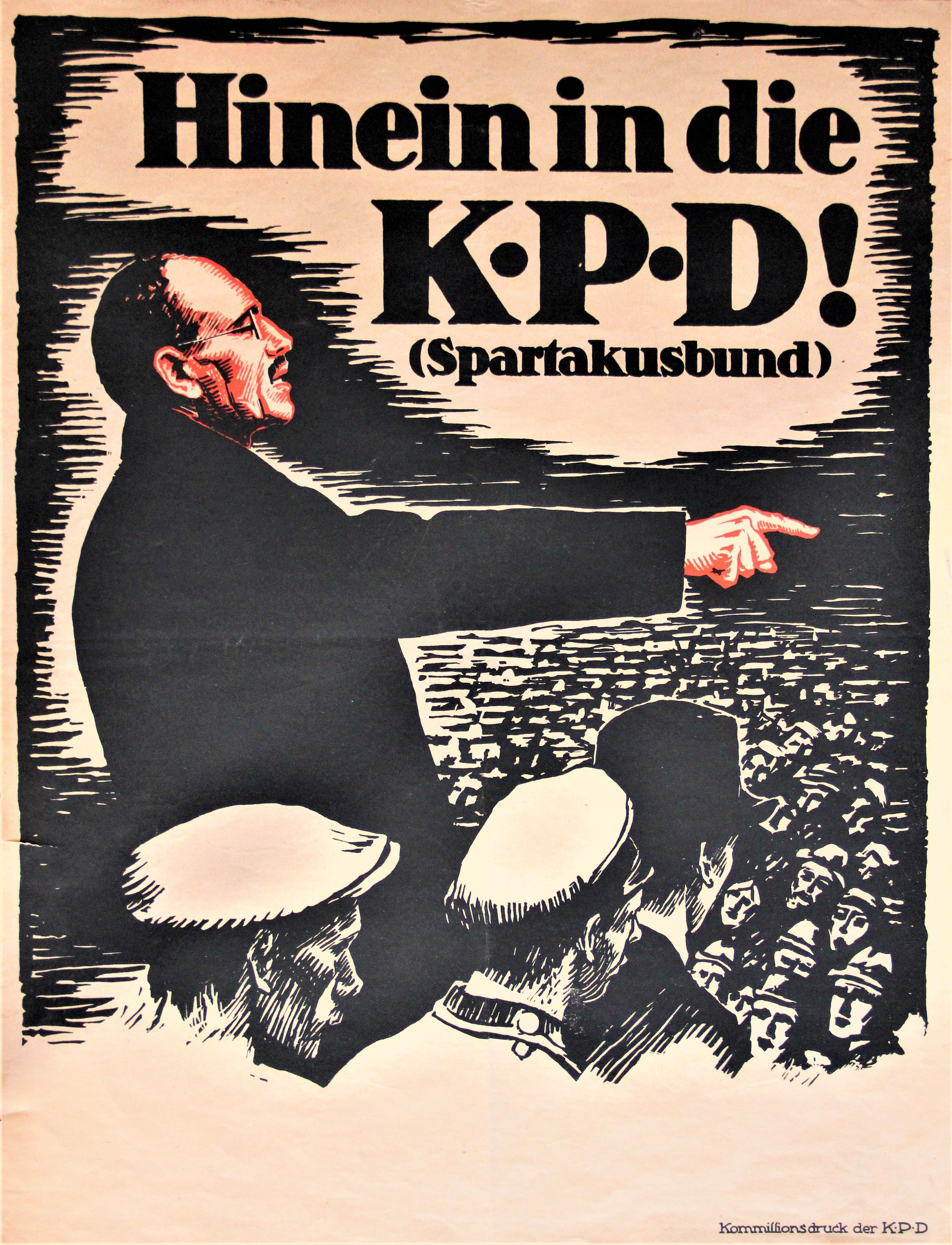
Poster urging people to join the KPD, with Karl Liebknecht addressing the crowd

The founding congress of the Communist Party of Germany (KPD) was held in Berlin from 30 December 1918 to 1 January 1919. On 31 December, 127 delegates, comprising 94 Spartacists and 29 members of the International Communists of Germany (IKD), voted to establish the KPD. The IKD was a left communist grouping based primarily in Bremen and Hamburg, founded on 23 November 1918 and being the first declared communist party in Germany. The party was under the influence of Johann Knief and Otto Rühle, and shaped by the ideas of Karl Radek and Anton Pannekoek. The IKD brought a council communist and anti-centralist tradition into the new party that proved an early source of tension.

A major controversy at the congress concerned parliamentary elections. The leading Spartacists, including Luxemburg, Paul Levi, Leo Jogiches, and Käte Duncker, favoured contesting the upcoming elections, but delegates rejected parliamentarianism in a vote of 62 to 23, and said it was a distraction from direct revolutionary action. The party's first Central Committee included Hermann Duncker, Käte Duncker, Hugo Eberlein, Paul Frölich, Leo Jogiches, Paul Levi, Karl Liebknecht, Rosa Luxemburg, Ernst Meyer, Wilhelm Pieck, and August Thalheimer.

=== The Spartacist uprising and the murder of the founders ===
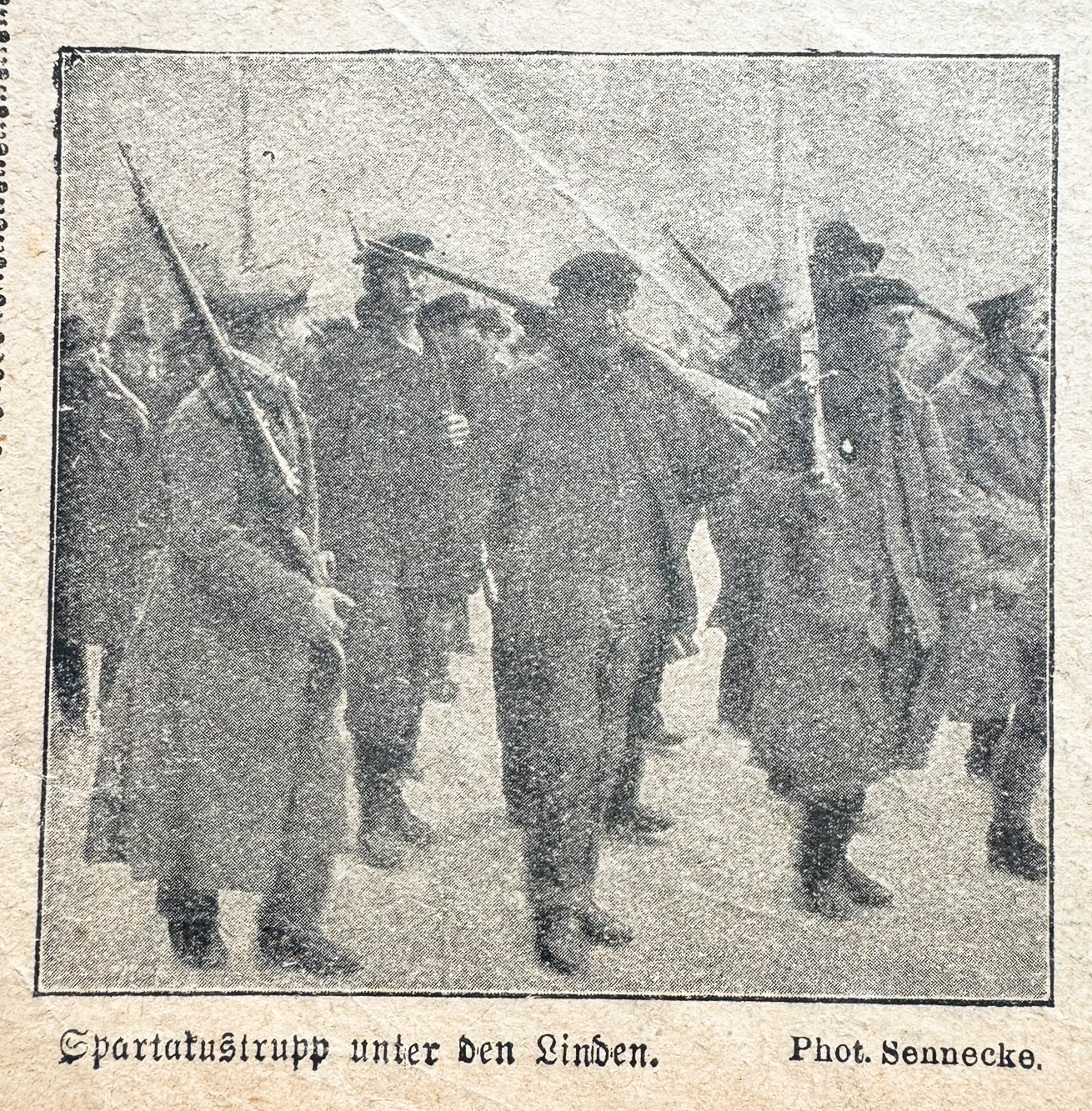
The Spartacus League in a show of force on Berlin's main thoroughfare, Unter den Linden

On 5 January 1919, Berlin armaments workers and Revolutionary Stewards launched an armed uprising in protest against the dismissal of Berlin Police President Emil Eichhorn for refusing to use his forces against the People's Navy Division during the 1918 Christmas crisis. The KPD joined the call to action. The Spartacist uprising was crushed by regular army units and newly formed Freikorps paramilitaries acting on the orders of SPD Defence Minister Gustav Noske.

On 15 January 1919, Rosa Luxemburg and Karl Liebknecht were captured by members of the Freikorps Guard Cavalry Rifle Division and murdered. Freikorps officer Waldemar Pabst gave the order, which he stated was received from Gustav Noske in agreement with SPD leader Friedrich Ebert. Leo Jogiches was murdered in prison in March 1919 while investigating their deaths, and Franz Mehring died of illness in late January 1919. The deaths of four of the Spartacus League's founders within weeks of the KPD's founding left the new party without its most prominent leadership at a critical moment and permanently poisoned relations between the KPD and the SPD.

== The Weimar Republic ==
=== Growth and internal conflicts ===
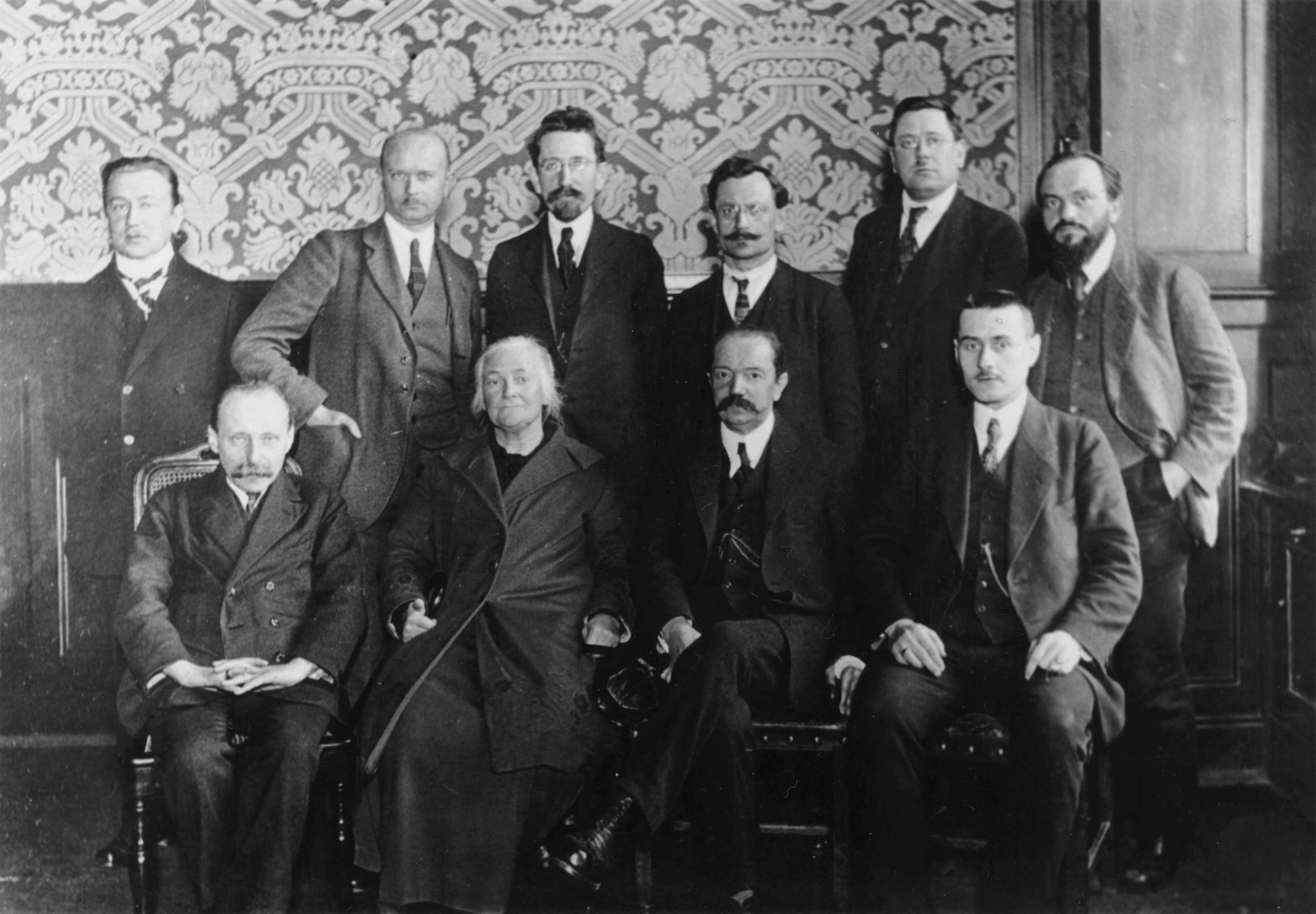
Members of the KPD Reichstag faction, c. 1921. Sitting from left to right: Joseph Herzfeld, Clara Zetkin, Emil Eichhorn, Georg Berthelé. Standing from left to right: Max Heydemann, Walter Stoecker, Wilhelm Koenen, Wilhelm Bartz, Heinrich Malzahn, Paul Frölich

Following the death of Jogiches, the KPD became more moderate under the leadership of Paul Levi, with the goal of winning over SPD and USPD voters. This succeeded when a large section of the USPD merged with the KPD. The IKD minority that were against the centralised policies of the KPD were expelled at the Heidelberg congress of 1919 and accused of syndicalism by Paul Levi; the leading expelled members, including Otto Rühle and Heinrich Laufenberg, founded the Communist Workers' Party of Germany (KAPD) on 3 April 1920.

Throughout the 1920s the KPD suffered internal conflicts that were similar to the power struggles occurring in Moscow between Joseph Stalin, Grigory Zinoviev, and others. Levi was expelled from the Comintern in 1921 for "indiscipline" after publicly criticising the party leadership's role in the failed March Action. Subsequent leadership changes led to dissenting supporters of the Left and Right Opposition to be expelled; Heinrich Brandler, August Thalheimer, and Paul Frölich set up the Communist Party Opposition in 1928. The KPD leadership had requested that Moscow send Leon Trotsky to Germany to direct the 1923 insurrection; however, this proposal was rejected by the Politburo (controlled by a troika of Stalin, Zinoviev, and Lev Kamenev) whom sent a commission of lower-ranking Russian Communist Party members instead.

During the Weimar period the KPD was considered the largest communist party in Europe, apart from the Communist Party of the Soviet Union, and was seen as the "leading party" of the international communist movement outside Soviet territory. The party regularly polled between 10 and 15 percent in Reichstag elections and had representatives in both the national parliament and state assemblies. In 1926 the KPD cooperated with the SPD on a referendum to expropriate the German nobility, together mobilising 14.4 million voters. From 1923 until 1928, the KPD broadly followed a united front policy of working with other working-class and socialist parties to contest elections and fight the rising right-wing militias. Most notable was when the KPD formed a coalition government with the SPD in October 1923, in the states of Saxony and Thuringia, though these governments were swiftly overthrown by the Reichswehr through the constitutional process of Reichsexekution.

=== The Thälmann era and the social fascism thesis ===
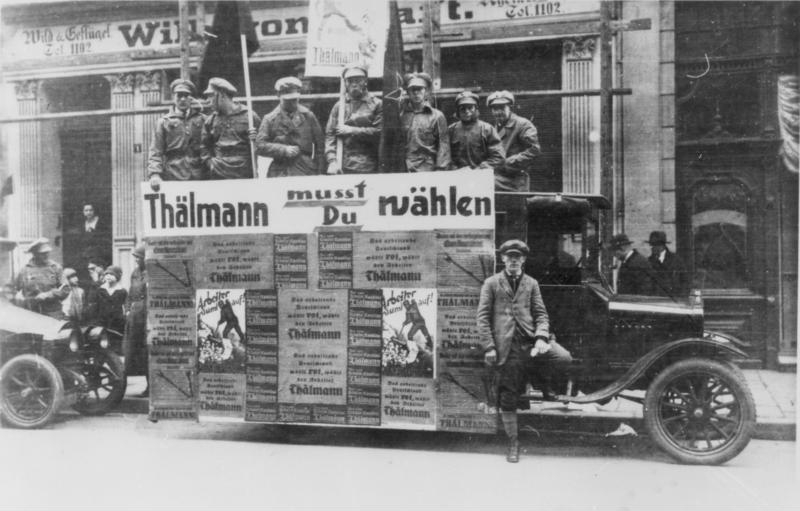
KPD election campaign material in Essen, 1925

From 1925 onwards, Ernst Thälmann led the KPD at Stalin's direction, becoming what one historian described as "the driving force behind Stalinisation in the mid to late 1920s" and "Stalin's right hand in Germany." Under Thälmann, the party adopted the Comintern's social fascism thesis, holding that the SPD was objectively the "moderate wing" of fascism because it upheld capitalism while providing a façade of workers' representation. The term "social fascism" had been introduced to the German Communist Party shortly after the Hamburg uprising of 1923, and by 1929 was being propagated as an established theory. In practice this meant the KPD directed most of its attacks not against the NSDAP but against the SPD, which it regarded as its principal adversary and referred to as "social fascists."

This strategy had consequences for the KPD, most notably during Blutmai in 1929, when the SPD-controlled Berlin police violently dispersed KPD May Day marches, killing an estimated 33 civilians, injuring 200, and taking over a thousand into police custody, most of whom were not involved in the initial KPD rallies. This event deepened the rift between the two parties. In the early 1930s the KPD supported the 1931 referendum attempt to topple the social democrat government of Prussia, launched by the far-right Stahlhelm. Thälmann declared that the Nazi Party was a less sophisticated and thus less dangerous fascist party than the SPD, and that "some Nazi trees must not be allowed to overshadow a forest [of social democrats]."

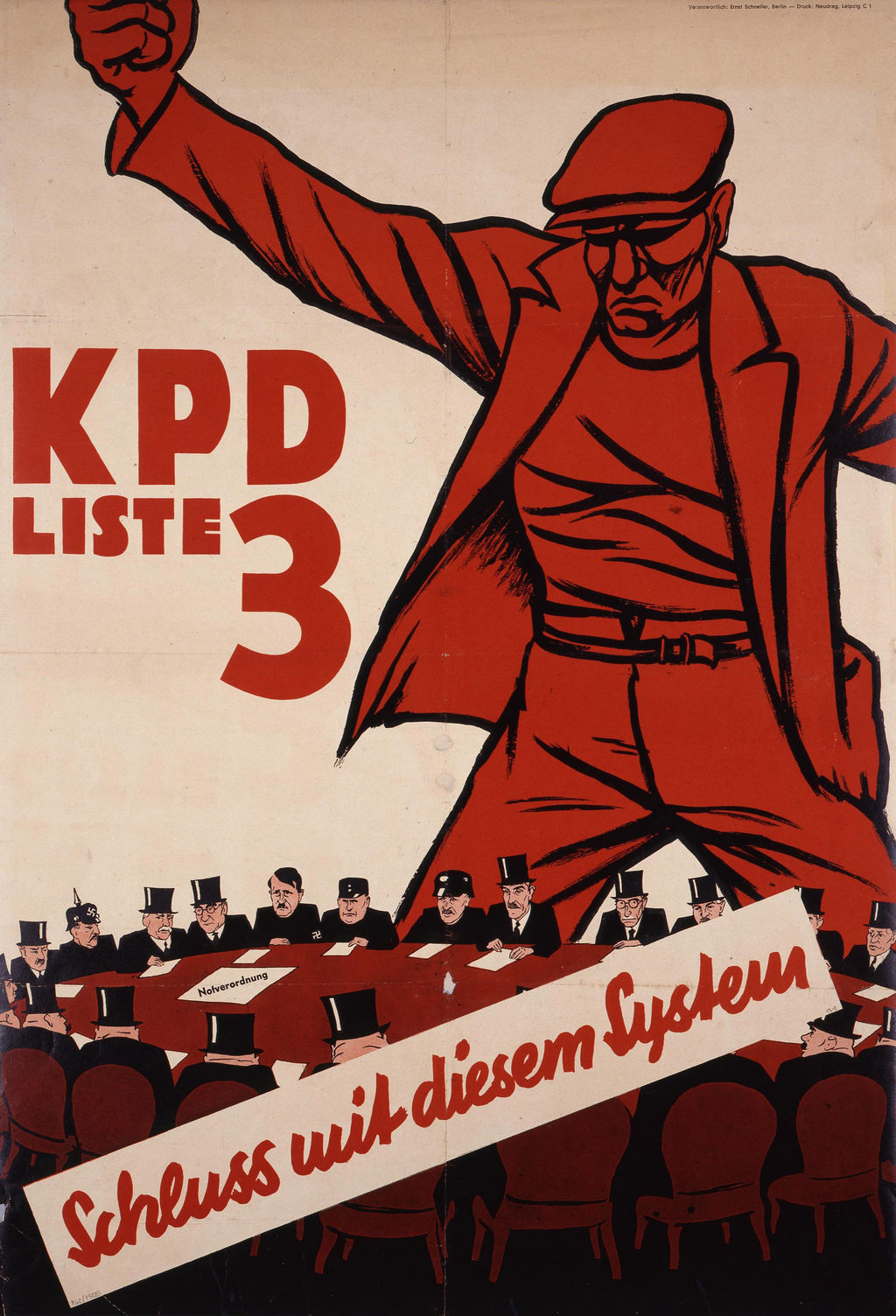
KPD election poster, 1932, with the caption "An end to this system!"

Critics, including Leon Trotsky from the Comintern's Left Opposition and August Thalheimer of the Right Opposition, argued persistently for a united front between the KPD and SPD against the rising Nazi threat. Thälmann dismissed such calls, insisting that SPD leaders could only be "coerced by the masses" rather than approached directly. The SPD for its part characterised its opposition to all three antidemocratic forces in its famous 1932 election poster bearing the Three Arrows symbol, directed against reactionary conservatism, Nazism, and communism alike, with the slogan "Against Papen, Hitler, Thälmann."

The KPD maintained a solid electoral performance throughout the Weimar period, gaining 100 deputies in the November 1932 German federal election with 16.9 percent of the vote and coming third. In the presidential election of the same year, Thälmann took 13.2 percent of the vote in the first round, compared to Hitler's 30.1 percent. These strong results were achieved just months before catastrophe.

== The Nazi era ==
=== Banning and suppression ===
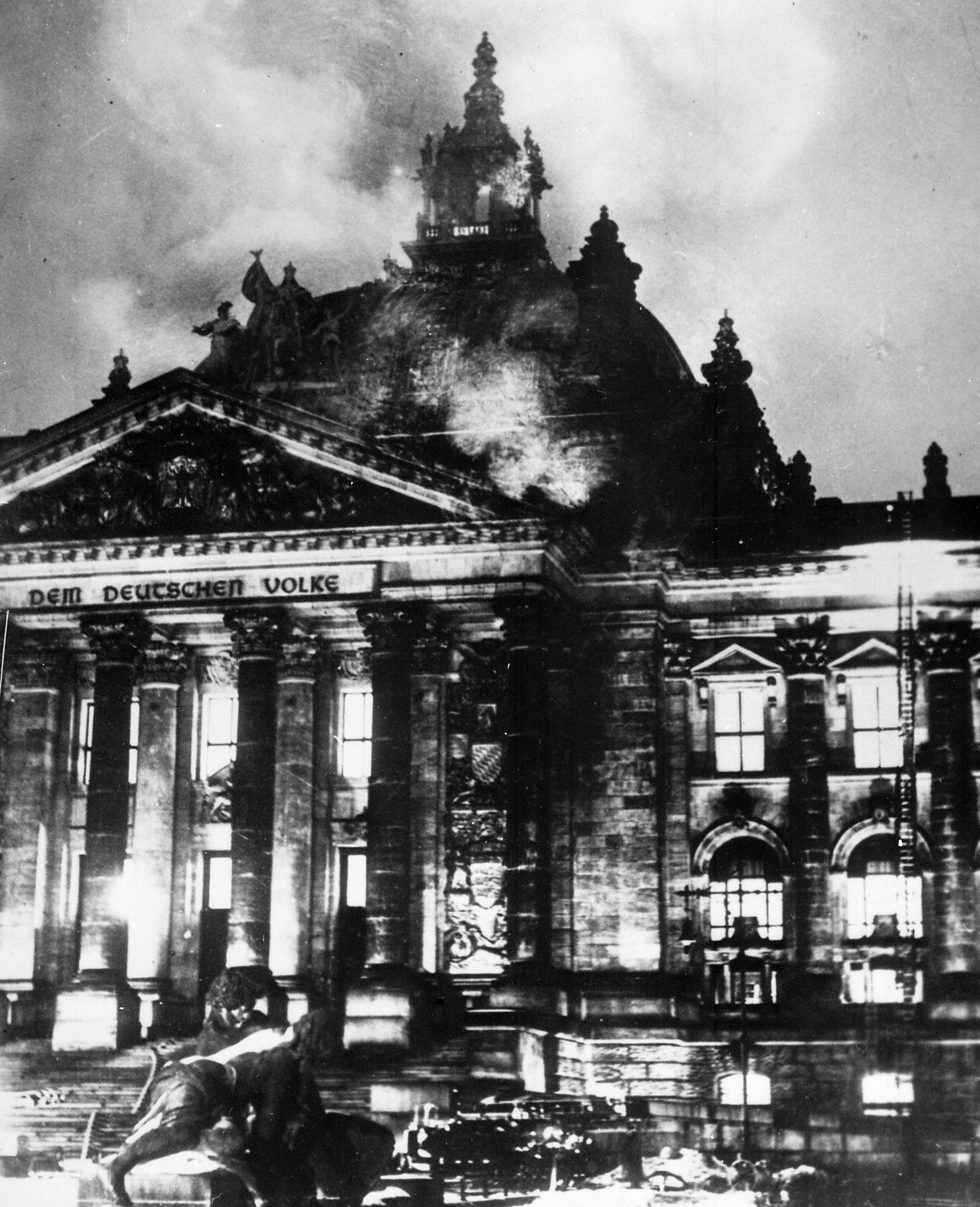
The Reichstag building on fire, 27 February 1933

On 27 February 1933 the Reichstag was set on fire, and Dutch council communist Marinus van der Lubbe was found near the building. The Nazis publicly blamed communist agitators in general, although a German court in 1933 decided that van der Lubbe had acted alone, as he himself claimed. The following day Hitler persuaded President Hindenburg to issue the Reichstag Fire Decree, suspending key civil liberties under the pretext of combating a communist threat. Repression began within hours. Hitler did not formally ban the KPD immediately, partly fearing violent resistance and also wishing to use it to split the left-wing vote. Regardless of this most judges treated KPD membership as treasonous in itself, and the party was effectively banned as of 6 March 1933, the day after the election.

The Enabling Act of 1933 was passed on 23 March, with only SPD deputies voting against it as the KPD deputies had been arrested or gone into exile, giving Hitler dictatorial powers. Historian Richard J. Evans argued that the act was passed illegally, as Reichstag President Hermann Göring had refused to count the KPD seats for purposes of obtaining the required quorum, which amounted to "refusing to recognize their existence" and was thus "an illegal act." KPD leaders Wilhelm Pieck and Walter Ulbricht fled into Soviet exile. The party maintained an underground organisation in Germany throughout the Nazi period focused mainly on distributing anti-Nazi literature, leading to approximately 30,000 communists being executed between 1933 and 1939, and a further 150,000 being sent to Nazi concentration camps.

=== Persecution of KPD exiles in the USSR ===
German communists who fled to the Soviet Union ended up involved in Stalin's Great Purge of 1937–1938. Senior KPD leaders in Soviet exile who were executed included Hugo Eberlein, Heinz Neumann, Hermann Remmele, Hans Kippenberger, Fritz Schulte, and Hermann Schubert, while others such as Margarete Buber-Neumann were sent to the gulag. During this time, Gustav von Wangenheim and Erich Mielke (later the head of the Stasi in East Germany), denounced their fellow exiles to the NKVD. A higher proportion of the KPD Politburo membership died in the Soviet Union than died in Nazi Germany, and hundreds of German citizens, most of them communists, were handed over by Stalin's administration directly to the Gestapo.

== Post-war division (1945–1961) ==
=== The forced merger in the East: birth of the SED ===
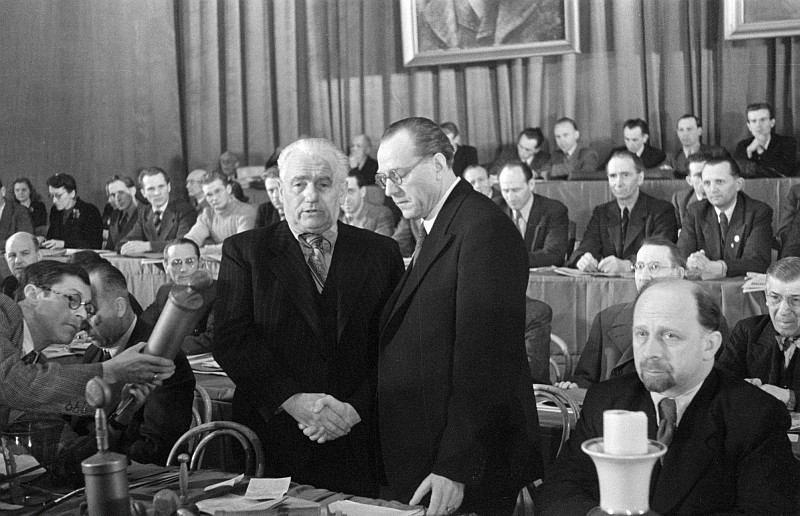
Otto Grotewohl (right) and Wilhelm Pieck (left) seal the unification of the SPD and KPD with a symbolic handshake, 21 April 1946. Walter Ulbricht is seated in the foreground.

Following the defeat of Germany in 1945, the country was divided into four occupation zones. In the Soviet zone the KPD was revived under returning exiles Pieck and Ulbricht. In April 1946, the Soviet Military Administration in Germany applied heavy pressure on the eastern branch of the SPD to merge with the KPD. In the British occupation zone, 80 percent of SPD members voted in a party referendum against such a merger, a vote ignored by the Soviet authorities. Despite significant opposition from many Social Democrats, many of whom fled to the western zones, the Socialist Unity Party of Germany (SED) was proclaimed on 21 April 1946, with Wilhelm Pieck (KPD) and Otto Grotewohl (SPD) sealing the merger with a symbolic handshake.

Official Soviet and East German histories portrayed the merger as voluntary. In reality, Soviet intelligence reports from SVAG Propaganda Administration director Lieutenant Colonel Sergei Ivanovich Tiulpanov, noted a considerable difficulty in convincing the population that the SED was a genuine German political party rather than a tool of the occupation. He also reported that former KPD members had expressed the sentiment that they had "forfeited [their] revolutionary positions" and that "the Social Democrats are not to be trusted." By the establishment of the GDR on 7 October 1949, the SED had become a continuation of the KPD under a new name, adhering to strict Marxist–Leninist principles. By the time of the 3rd Party Congress in July 1950, more than 62 percent of new Central Committee members had been members of the KPD before the 1946 merger, with little sign of the KPD/SPD parity that had been invoked when the SED was created.

Some former SPD members held prominent positions in East Germany. Grotewohl served as East Germany's first Chairman/Minister-President of the Council of Ministers from 1949 to 1964, and Friedrich Ebert, Jr., son of the former president, served as the Lord mayor of East Berlin from 1949 to 1967, reportedly having been blackmailed into supporting the merger by the use of his father's role in the 1918 schism against him.

=== The KPD in West Germany ===
In the western occupation zones the KPD reorganised and contested the first West German federal election in 1949, winning 5.7 percent of the vote and 15 Bundestag seats. However, due to the onset of the Cold War, widespread anti-communist sentiment, and the party having a reputation for being subservient to Moscow their support collapsed rapidly. The party's reputation was further damaged by the conduct of the Red Army during the occupation of eastern Germany, which included looting, political repression, and mass rape. Communist deputies to the Parlamentarischer Rat were ordered by Stalin to refuse signing West Germany's Basic Law, as to avoid giving more political legitimacy to West Germany. By the 1953 election the KPD's vote had fallen to 2.2 percent and it had lost all its seats. In August 1956 the Federal Constitutional Court of Germany banned the KPD as unconstitutional, a ruling upheld the following year by the European Commission of Human Rights in Communist Party of Germany v. the Federal Republic of Germany.

== East Germany under the SED (1949–1989) ==
=== Building a one-party state ===
From its founding in 1949, the German Democratic Republic was a one-party Marxist–Leninist state controlled by the SED. Other parties formally existed but were compelled to join the SED-controlled National Front, which predetermined legislative representation through fixed seat quotas. The SED followed the Soviet model of democratic centralism, with authority originating from the Party Congress of the SED through the Central Committee to the Politburo of the Central Committee, which in practice wielded absolute power. The SED required every member to live by the mantra "Where there is a comrade, the party is there too."

Walter Ulbricht, General Secretary/First Secretary of the SED from 1950 to 1971, oversaw the construction of East Germany's socialist economy and the building of the Berlin Wall in 1961 to stem the flow of population westward. At the 3rd Party Congress in July 1950, with the election of Ulbricht as general secretary, the party shifted towards a more orthodox, Soviet-style, organisation. Ulbricht was deposed by Erich Honecker in May 1971 following failed economic reforms and a deteriorating relationship with Moscow.

=== The Honecker era ===
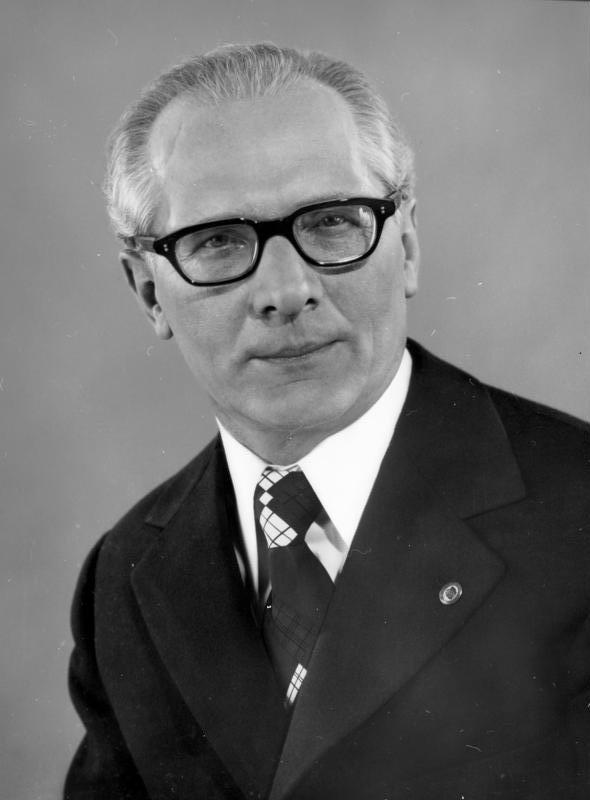
Erich Honecker, General Secretary of the SED from 1971 to 1989

Honecker's tenure as leader was marked by a period of relative social stability and rising living standards in the 1970s, sustained in part by loans from West Germany. SED policies at the time included introducing universal healthcare and education, the nationalisation of industry, mandatory ideological training in schools and universities which included lessons in Marxism-Leninism and Russian, and the collectivisation of agriculture. Culturally, Honecker made initial overtures toward greater openness at the 8th Party Congress in Spring 1971, declaring there could be "no taboos" in art and literature for those who proceeded from the firm position of socialism; this promise was quickly undermined in practice, as illustrated by the forced exile of singer Wolf Biermann in 1976.

By the early 1980s the GDR was experiencing increasing economic stagnation. When Soviet leader Mikhail Gorbachev introduced the policies of perestroika and glasnost, the SED under Honecker rejected these reforms as destabilising, viewing them as harmful to the socialist project, and the party reinforced its image as one of the most ideologically rigid in the Eastern Bloc. At the 11th Party Congress in April 1986, the SED celebrated its achievements as "the most successful party on German soil" and praised East Germany as "a politically stable and economically efficient socialist state." In 1989, Honecker publicly praised the Chinese government's suppression of protesters at Tiananmen Square.

=== The Peaceful Revolution and collapse ===
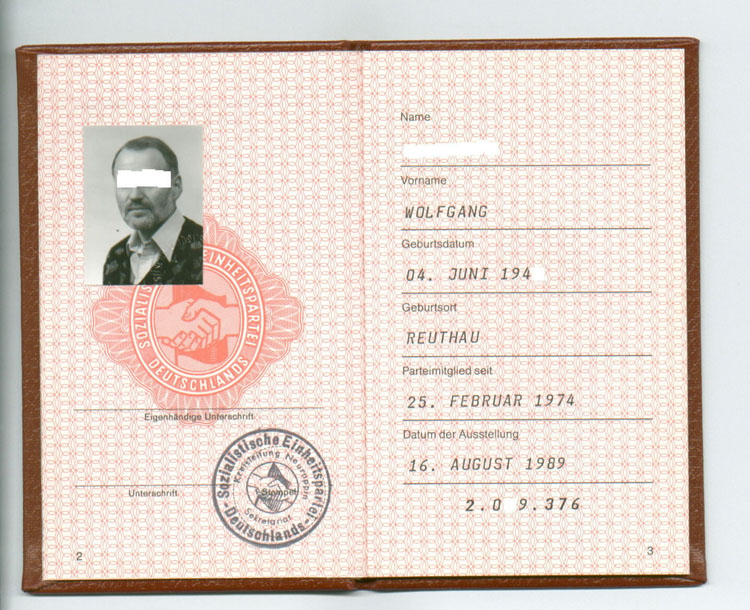
An SED membership card

Popular discontent greatly increased in Autumn 1989. Widespread street protests, most notably in Leipzig, combined with a mass exodus via Hungary fatally undermined the regime's authority. On 18 October 1989, Honecker was voted out as General Secretary and replaced by Egon Krenz. Krenz attempted to portray himself as a reformer, but this failed, in part due to him having visited China four months earlier to thank the government for the suppression of Tiananmen Square.

On 9 November 1989, the SED Politburo drafted new travel regulations which would allow anyone to visit West Germany by crossing East Germany's borders, with official permission. However, Günter Schabowski, unofficial party spokesman and East Berlin party boss, was not informed that the regulations would take effect on the afternoon of 10 November. When asked by a reporter when the regulations would come into effect, Schabowski assumed they were already in effect and replied: "As far as I know, effective immediately, without delay." This was then widely interpreted as a decision to open the Berlin Wall. Thousands of East Berliners amassed at the Wall; unprepared and unwilling to use force, the guards were quickly overwhelmed and let them through to West Berlin.

On 1 December 1989 the GDR parliament rescinded the constitutional clause defining the country as a socialist state under SED leadership, which formally ended communist rule. On 3 December the entire Central Committee and Politburo, including Krenz, resigned. At a special party congress in December, the SED renamed itself the Party of Democratic Socialism (PDS), abandoned Marxism-Leninism, and endorsed democratic socialism under new party chairman Gregor Gysi. In his first speech, Gysi admitted that the SED was responsible for the country's economic problems. In the 1990 election in East Germany, held on 18 March 1990, the PDS received 16.4 percent of the vote and held 66 seats. Germany was reunified on 3 October 1990. The SED had sequestered money in secret overseas accounts, including some which turned up in Liechtenstein in 2008 and were returned to the German government, as the PDS had rejected claims to overseas SED assets in 1990.

== West German communism after 1956 ==
=== The DKP ===
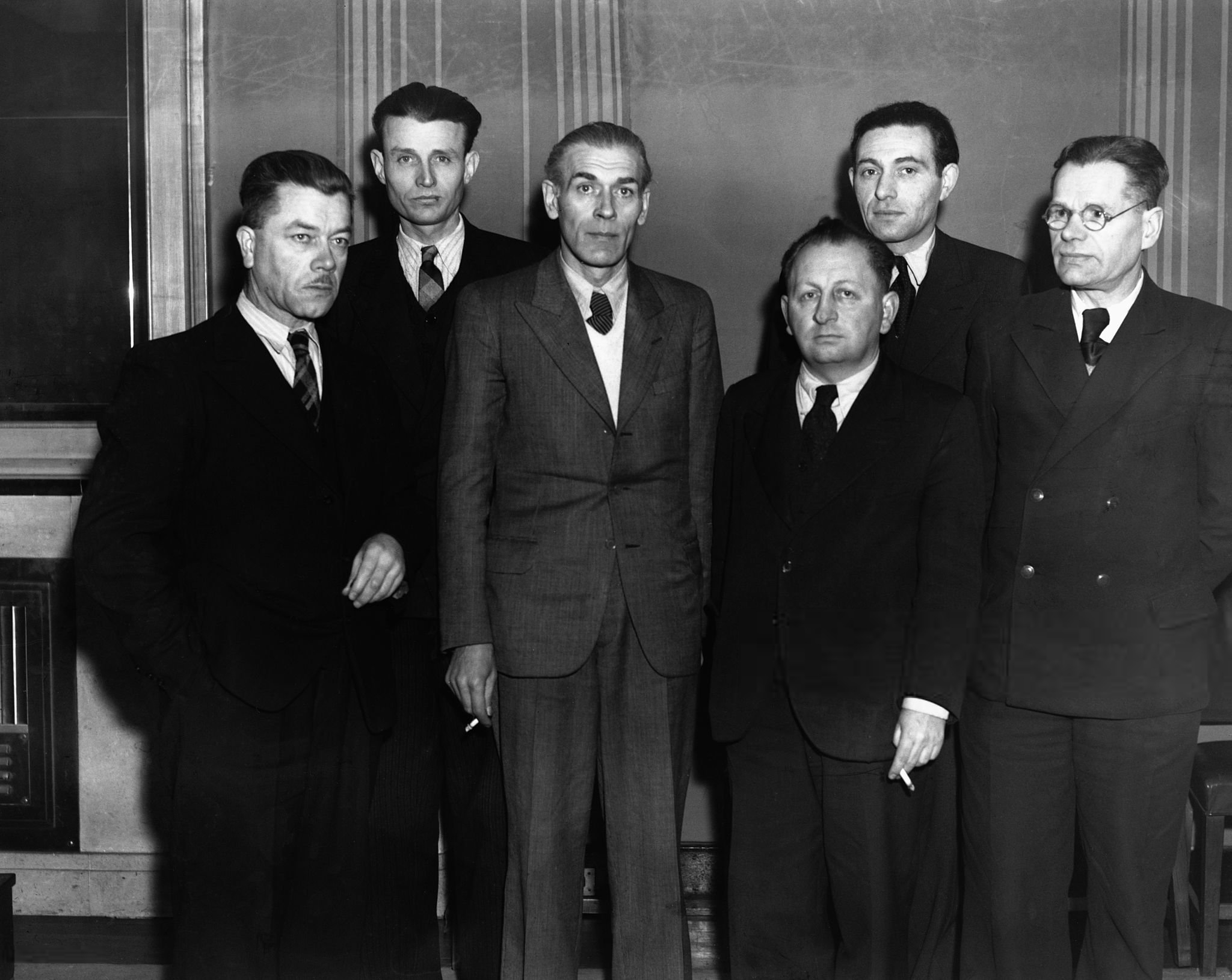
Members of the West German KPD at a meeting in London, 28 February 1947. From Left to Right: Albert Buchmann, Willi Agatz, Max Reimann, unknown, Leo Bauer, and Gustav Gundelach

Following the banning of the KPD in 1956, many of the party's former members continued to operate in secret. In 1968, former KPD functionaries negotiated with West German Federal Minister of Justice Gustav Heinemann, whom explained that while the refounding of a banned party was illegal, communists were free to form an entirely new party. The German Communist Party (DKP) was founded on 25 September 1968. The party's close links to the banned KPD made the new party vulnerable to being declared illegal. Despite these links no such declaration was requested; West German authorities at the time were liberalising their attitude towards the communist bloc and East Germany in particular.

The DKP remained on the political fringe, never winning more than 0.3 percent of the federal vote. The group achieved marginally greater local support, up to 3.1 percent in Bremen and 2.7 percent in the Saarland. Additionally, the party won municipal council seats in working-class communities such as Bottrop, North Rhine-Westphalia, and Mörfelden-Walldorf, Hesse and also in university towns such as Marburg, Hesse and Tübingen, Baden-Württemberg.

The DKP was considered a client party of the SED, and was given approximately DM70 million per year through the SED Central Committee's internal financial channels, while the Socialist Unity Party of West Berlin (SEW) received about DM15 million yearly.

Following German reunification, the DKP entered a prolonged decline. The DKP received national attention in early 2008 when Christel Wegner a member of the DKP, was elected to the Landtag of Lower Saxony on the list of Die Linke. Wegner allegedly endorsed the Berlin Wall, the Stasi, and other aspects of the East German state in an interview, causing embarrassment to Die Linke's leadership and resulting in her expulsion from the parliamentary group. The DKP remains a legal but extremely marginal party, with approximately 2,850 members as of 2021.

== Modern Germany ==
=== The PDS and Die Linke ===
The PDS remained a party following German reunification, achieving 17 seats in the 1990 German federal election. Throughout the 1990s and 2000s, the party received genuine electoral support from voters in former East German states. Support mainly came from parts of the electorate that felt left behind by reunification and harboured ostalgie for the GDR.

In January 2005, members of the SPD left to found the Labour and Social Justice – The Electoral Alternative (WASG) in opposition to the perceived neoliberal direction of Gerhard Schröder's government. In 2007 the PDS and WASG merged to form Die Linke (The Left), which claims to be the historical successor to the KPD by way of the PDS and the SED. Die Linke secured representation in the Bundestag and multiple state parliaments, including those of Schleswig-Holstein, Lower Saxony, Bremen, North Rhine-Westphalia, Saarland, Hesse, and Hamburg.

Die Link currently has representation in the Bundestag, the European Parliament, and seven state parliaments.

=== Legacy ===
Communism in Germany left an enduring and profoundly contradictory legacy. The KPD's failure to build a united front against National Socialism remains one of the most debated counterfactual questions in 20th-century history. The SED's 40-year rule over East Germany produced guaranteed employment, universal welfare provision, and state-enforced equality alongside political repression, mass surveillance by the Stasi, the shooting of those who sought to flee, and economic stagnation. Assessments of the GDR continue to divide historians, former citizens, and politicians in reunified Germany. The SPD, from whose radical wing communism in Germany was born, endured as the principal social democratic party throughout this entire period, often in bitter opposition to communist movements, yet sharing with them the foundational conviction that capitalism required fundamental transformation.

== Organisations ==
- General German Workers' Association
- Social Democratic Workers' Party of Germany
- Social Democratic Party of Germany
- Independent Social Democratic Party of Germany
- Spartacus League
- International Communists of Germany
- Communist Party of Germany
- Communist Workers' Party of Germany
- Communist Party Opposition
- Socialist Unity Party of Germany
- Socialist Unity Party of West Berlin
- German Communist Party
- Party of Democratic Socialism (Germany)
- The Left (Germany)

== See also ==
- Communism in Russia
- History of the Social Democratic Party of Germany
- German Revolution of 1918–1919
- Spartacist uprising
- Weimar Republic
- German Democratic Republic
- Berlin Wall
- Peaceful Revolution
- Ostalgie
