= Free Socialist Party/Marxist-Leninists =

Defunct political party in West Germany

Free Socialist Party/Marxist-Leninists Freie Sozialistische Partei/Marxisten-Leninisten
- First Secretary of the Central Committee: Günter Ackermann
- Second Secretary of the Central Committee: Werner Heuzeroth
- Founded: April 22, 1967
- Dissolved: 1968
- Merged into: Communist Party of Germany/Marxists–Leninists
- Headquarters: Hütteweg, Niederschelderhütte, Mudersbach
- Newspaper: Die Wahrheit
- Membership (1967): ~30
- Ideology: Marxism-Leninism

The Free Socialist Party/Marxist-Leninists (German: Freie Sozialistische Partei/Marxisten-Leninisten, abbreviated FSP or FSP/ML) was a small Maoist political party in West Germany. FSP/ML was the second Maoist group founded in West Germany. It was one of the predecessor organizations of the Communist Party of Germany/Marxists–Leninists.

== Preparations ==
In February 1967 the Founding Committee of the Free Socialist Party issued an appeal to "all West German Social Democrats, Left Socialists and Communists" to join in founding a new left party. The Committee consisted of Günter Ackermann, Werner Heuzeroth and Gerhard Lambrecht. A draft programme for the new party was released in March 1967.

== Founding ==
FSP was founded on April 22, 1967, in Frankfurt am Main. It was the second Maoist group to emerge in West Germany. Unlike the secretive Marxist-Leninist Party of Germany, an earlier West German Maoist grouping, FSP was founded publicly. Ackermann, a former sergeant of the East German Volkspolizei, became first secretary of the Central Committee of the party. At the time of the founding of FSP, the 28-year-old Ackermann was an unemployed refugee from the German Democratic Republic. Heuzeroth (an innkeeper) became second secretary of the same committee. Heuzeroth's wife was also included in the Central Committee.

== Profile ==
Ideologically, the party was pro-China. In total FSP was estimated to have around thirty members. The party published Die Wahrheit ('The Truth'). Die Wahrheit carried news of contacts between the party and pro-China groups in Belgium, Austria and Switzerland.

The party called for the admission of the People's Republic of China to the United Nations. It denounced 'Moscow revisionists', and labelled the leadership of the German Democratic Republic an 'oppressive clique'. On the other hand, the illegal newspaper Freies Volk (organ of the Communist Party of Germany) claimed that Ackermann was a Verfassungsschutz agent and paid by the West German government.

FSP/ML condemned the Warsaw Pact intervention in Czechoslovakia, stating that they were

particularly disturbed that German soldiers were involved, in this act of aggression. This calls forth our gravest condemnation as German Communists. Here again the Ulbricht clique has shown its true face. We set ourselves apart from such traitors to true Marxism-Leninism, and at the same time from the Reimann Communists, who have given their blessings to this banditry.

== Merger with KPD/ML ==
In late 1968 FSP/ML merged with the Roter Morgen and Spartakus groups, and some other sectors, forming the Communist Party of Germany/Marxists–Leninists (KPD/ML). After the merger into KPD/ML, Die Wahrheit became a local organ of KPD/ML in Siegen-Olpe.
