= Sozialistische Volkszeitung =

West German communist newspaper (1949–1956)

Sozialistische Volkszeitung ('Socialist People's Newspaper') was a communist newspaper published from Frankfurt am Main, West Germany. It was an organ of the Communist Party of Germany. It was published daily (except Sundays) between August 1, 1949, and August 17, 1956.
