= Albert Buchmann =

German politician (1894–1975)

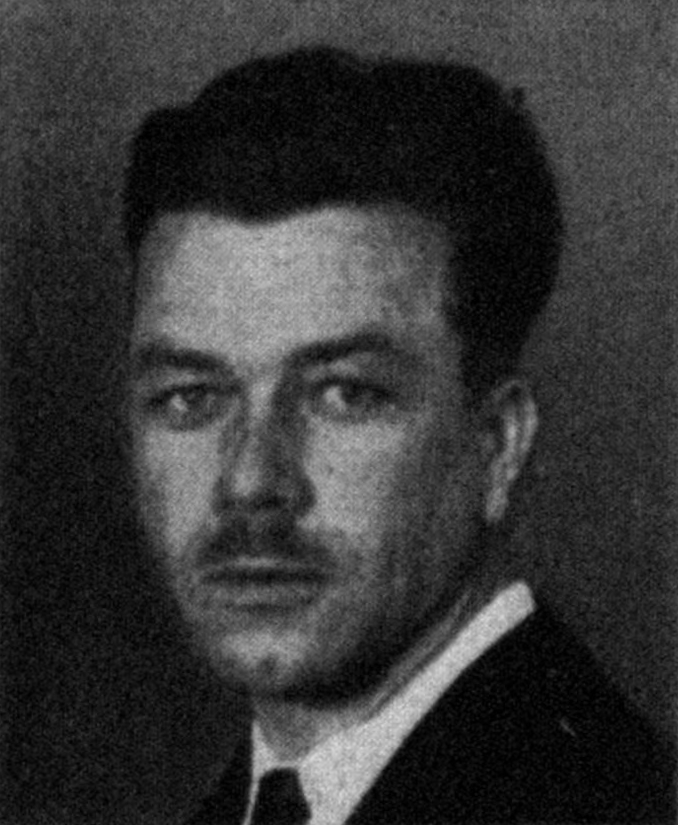
Buchmann's official Reichstag portrait, 1932

Albert Buchmann (28 October 1894 – 17 May 1975) was a German politician. He was a member of the Communist Party of Germany (KPD) and was Reichstag deputy of the party from 1924 to 1933.

== Life ==
Buchmann was born in 1894 in Pirmasens. From 1914 to 1918 he served as a soldier in the First World War. After the end of the war, in 1919 he joined the Independent Social Democratic Party of Germany. In 1920 he moved to Munich, where in 1921 he joined the Communist Party of Germany (KDP). In 1922 he became president of the Shoe Workers' Union. From 1923 Buchmann was head of the KPD in Munich. In October 1923 he was imprisoned. In the years 1925 to 1932 he was political leader of the Southern Bavaria district. From 1932 he held the same position in the district of Württemberg. From 1924 to 1932 he belonged to the constituency Upper Bavaria-Swabia.

In May 1933, Buchmann was arrested and accused of high treason. In 1936 he was sent to Dachau concentration camp and Ludwigsburg prison. In 1940 he was moved to Sachsenhausen concentration camp, 1942 he was moved to Flossenbürg concentration camp until his release in 1945.

He was released at the end of the war and from 1945 he was chairman of the KPD for Northern Wuerttemberg. From 1946-1950 he was a member of the Provisional People's Representative for Baden-Württemberg, the National Constituent Assembly of Baden-Württemberg and the first parliament of Baden-Württemberg. In 1948, Buchmann became a member of the party executive of the KPD.

In 1952 he emigrated to the German Democratic Republic. From 1955 he was party secretary of the Socialist Unity Party of Germany. From 1956 to 1971 he was a member of the Central Committee of the now banned West German KPD.

He died in 1975 in Berlin.

== Literature ==
- Martin Broszat, Hartmut Mehringer (eds.): Bayern in der NS-Zeit. Die Parteien KPD, SPD, BVP in Verfolgung und Widerstand. Oldenbourg, München 1983, S. 25.
- Klaus J. Becker: Die KPD in Rheinland-Pfalz 1946–1956. von Hase & Koehler, Mainz 2001, S. 424.
- Hermann Weber, Andreas Herbst: Deutsche Kommunisten. Biographisches Handbuch 1918 bis 1945. Karl Dietz Verlag, Berlin, ISBN 3-320-02044-7, S. 129f.
