= Communist Party of Germany =

Political party in Germany (1919–1946/1956)

Communist Party of Germany Kommunistische Partei Deutschlands
- Founders: Karl Liebknecht; Rosa Luxemburg
- Founded: 30 December 1918; 107 years ago
- Dissolved: 21 April 1946; 80 years ago (Note: (East German branch)); 17 August 1956; 70 years ago (Note: (West German branch))
- Merger of: Spartacus League; International Communists
- Merged into: Socialist Unity Party
- Succeeded by: German Communist Party
- Headquarters: Karl-Liebknecht-Haus, Berlin
- Newspaper: Die Rote Fahne
- Youth wing: Young Communist League
- Political academy: Marxist Workers' School
- Trade union: Revolutionäre Gewerkschafts Opposition
- Paramilitary wing: Roter Frontkämpferbund
- Intelligence service: Antimilitärischer Apparat
- Membership: 360,000 (Nov. 1932 est.)
- Ideology: Communism; Council communism (1919); Luxemburgism (1919–1928); Marxism–Leninism (from 1928); Stalinism (from 1928)
- Political position: Far-left
- International affiliation: Comintern (until 1943)
- Colours: Red (official)
- Anthem: Die Internationale (lit. 'The Internationale')

Party flag

The Communist Party of Germany (German: Kommunistische Partei Deutschlands, pronounced [kɔmuˈnɪstɪʃə paʁˈtaɪ ˈdɔʏtʃlants], KPD [ˌkaːpeːˈdeː]) was the major far-left political party in the Weimar Republic during the interwar period, an underground resistance movement in Nazi Germany, and a minor party in Allied-occupied Germany and West Germany during the post-war period until it merged with the SPD in the Soviet occupation zone in 1946 and was banned by the West German Federal Constitutional Court in 1956.

The construction of the KPD began in the aftermath of the First World War by Rosa Luxemburg's and Karl Liebknecht's faction of the Independent Social Democratic Party of Germany (USPD) who had opposed the war and the Majority Social Democratic Party of Germany (MSPD)'s support of it.

The KPD joined the Spartacist uprising of January 1919, which sought to establish a council republic in Germany. After the defeat of the uprising, and the murder of KPD leaders Rosa Luxemburg, Karl Liebknecht and Leo Jogiches, the party temporarily steered a more moderate, loyal-oppositionist course under the leadership of Paul Levi. He was defeated by the Marxist Leninist wing of the party and three months later he was expelled from both the KPD and Comintern because of his public criticism of the role of the party leadership in the March Action of 1921. During the Weimar Republic period, the KPD usually polled between 10 and 15 percent of the vote and was represented in the national Reichstag and in state parliaments. Under the leadership of Ernst Thälmann from 1925 the party became thoroughly Marxist-Leninist and more loyal to the politics of the Soviet Union, and from 1928 it was largely influenced and funded by the Comintern. Under Thälmann's leadership the party directed most of its attacks against the Social Democratic Party of Germany (SPD), which it regarded as its main adversary and referred to as "social fascists"; the KPD adopted what is known as the 'social fascism' thesis under Stalin's direction. This position held that social democracy, particularly the SPD, was objectively a variant of fascism – 'social fascism' – because it supposedly upheld capitalism while providing a façade of workers' representation, considering all other parties in the Weimar Republic to be "fascists".

The KPD was banned in the Weimar Republic one day after the Nazi Party emerged triumphant in the German elections in 1933. It maintained an underground organization in Nazi Germany, and the KPD and groups associated with it led the internal resistance to the Nazi regime, with a focus on distributing anti-Nazi literature. The KPD suffered heavy losses between 1933 and 1939, with 30,000 Communists executed and 150,000 sent to Nazi concentration camps. Many German Communists went to the Soviet Union. However, 60% of German exiles in the Soviet Union were liquidated during the Stalinist terror and a higher proportion of the KPD Politburo membership died in the Soviet Union than in Nazi Germany. Hundreds of German citizens, the majority of whom were Communists, had been handed over to the Gestapo from Stalin's administration.

The party was revived in divided postwar West and East Germany and won seats in the first Bundestag (West German Parliament) elections in 1949. The KPD was banned as extremist in West Germany in 1956 by the Federal Constitutional Court. In 1969, some of its former members founded an even smaller fringe party, the German Communist Party (DKP), which remains legal, and multiple tiny splinter groups claiming to be the successor to the KPD have also subsequently been formed. In East Germany, the party was merged, by Soviet decree, with remnants of the Social Democratic Party to form the Socialist Unity Party (SED) which ruled East Germany from 1949 until 1989–1990; the merger was opposed by many Social Democrats, many of whom fled to the western zones. After the fall of the Berlin Wall, reformists took over the SED and renamed it the Party of Democratic Socialism (PDS); in 2007 the PDS subsequently merged with the SPD splinter faction WASG to form Die Linke.

== Early history ==
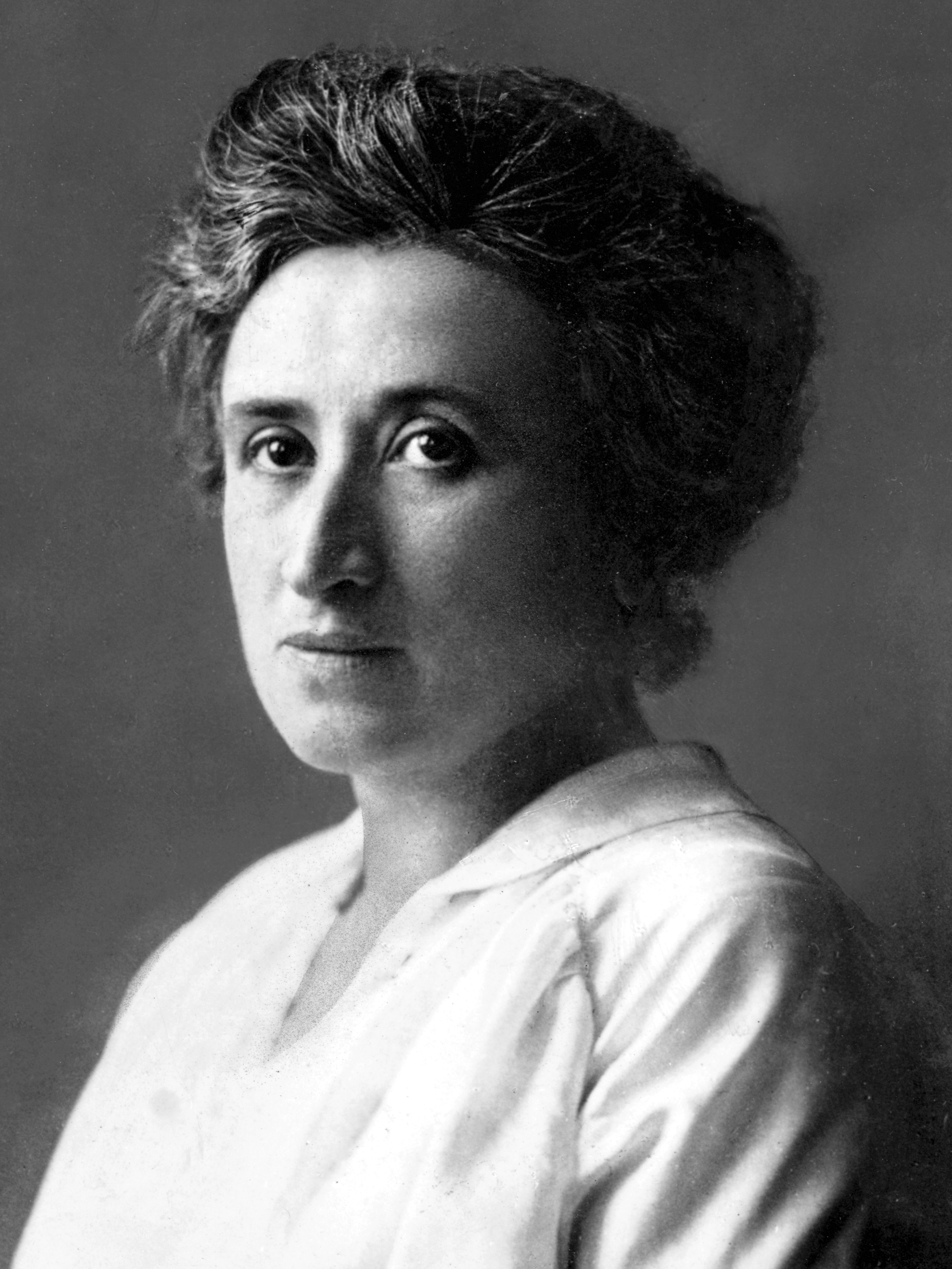
Rosa Luxemburg

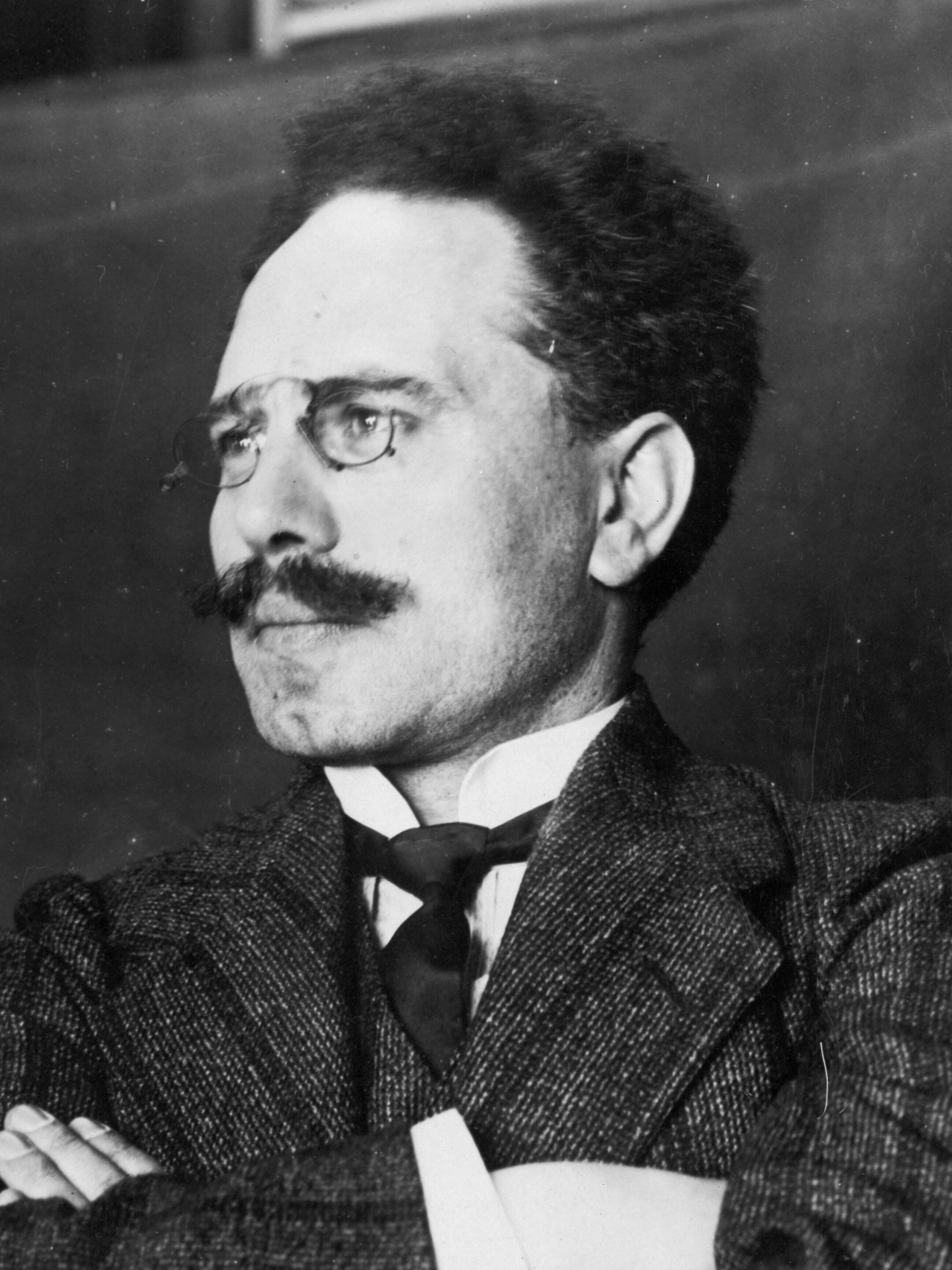
Karl Liebknecht

Before World War I, the Social Democratic Party (SPD) was the largest party in Germany and the world's most successful socialist party. Although still officially claiming to be a Marxist party, by 1914 it had become in practice a reformist party. In 1914 the SPD members of the Reichstag voted in favour of the war. Left-wing members of the party, led by Karl Liebknecht and Rosa Luxemburg, strongly opposed the war, and the SPD soon suffered a split between the factions. From the split emerged the Independent Social Democratic Party of Germany (USPD) and the more radical Spartacist League; the latter formed the core of what would become the KPD. In November 1918, revolution broke out across Germany. The KPD held its founding congress in Berlin from 30 December 1918 to 1 January 1919, in the reception hall of the City Council. Rosa Luxemburg was initially against the setting up of a new party but joined the KPD after her initial hesitation. Apart from the Spartacists, another dissident group of socialists called the International Communists of Germany (IKD), also dissenting members of the Social Democratic party but mainly located in Hamburg, Bremen and Northern Germany, joined the KPD. The Revolutionary Shop Stewards, a network of dissenting socialist trade unionists centered in Berlin, were also invited to the congress, but ultimately did not join the KPD because they deemed the founding congress too syndicalist-leaning.

The Party's first Central Committee consisted of Hermann Duncker, Käte Duncker, Hugo Eberlein, Paul Frölich, Leo Jogiches, Paul Lange, Paul Levi, Karl Liebknecht, Rosa Luxemburg, Ernst Meyer, Wilhelm Pieck, and August Thalheimer.

There were seven main reports given at the founding congress:

- "Economical Struggles" – by Paul Lange
- Greeting speech – by Karl Radek
- "International Conferences" – by Hermann Duncker
- "Our Organization" – by Hugo Eberlein
- "Our Program" – by Rosa Luxemburg
- "The Crisis of the USPD" – by Karl Liebknecht
- "The National Assembly" – by Paul Levi

These reports were given by leading figures of the Spartacist League, but members of the International Communists of Germany also took part in the discussions.

Under the leadership of Liebknecht and Luxemburg, the KPD was committed to a revolution in Germany, and attempts to bring down the interim government and create a revolutionary situation continued during 1919 and 1920. Germany's SPD leadership, which had come to power after the fall of the monarchy, was vehemently opposed to a socialist revolution. With the new regime terrified of a Bolshevik Revolution in Germany, Defense Minister Gustav Noske recruited former right-wing military officers and demobilized veterans and formed various Freikorps and anti-Communist paramilitaries to violently suppress all revolutionary activity. During the failed Spartacist uprising in Berlin of January 1919, Liebknecht and Luxemburg, who had not initiated the uprising but joined once it had begun, were captured by the Freikorps and murdered. At its peak, the party had 350–400,000 members in 1920. The party split a few months later into two factions, the KPD and the much smaller Communist Workers' Party of Germany (KAPD).

Following the assassination of Leo Jogiches, Paul Levi became the KPD's leader. Other prominent members included Clara Zetkin, Paul Frölich, Hugo Eberlein, Franz Mehring, Julian Marchlewski, August Thalheimer, Wilhelm Pieck, and Ernst Meyer. Levi led the party away from the policy of immediate revolution, in an effort to win over SPD and USPD voters and trade union officials. These efforts were rewarded when a substantial section of the USPD joined the KPD, making it a mass party for the first time.

== Weimar Republic years ==
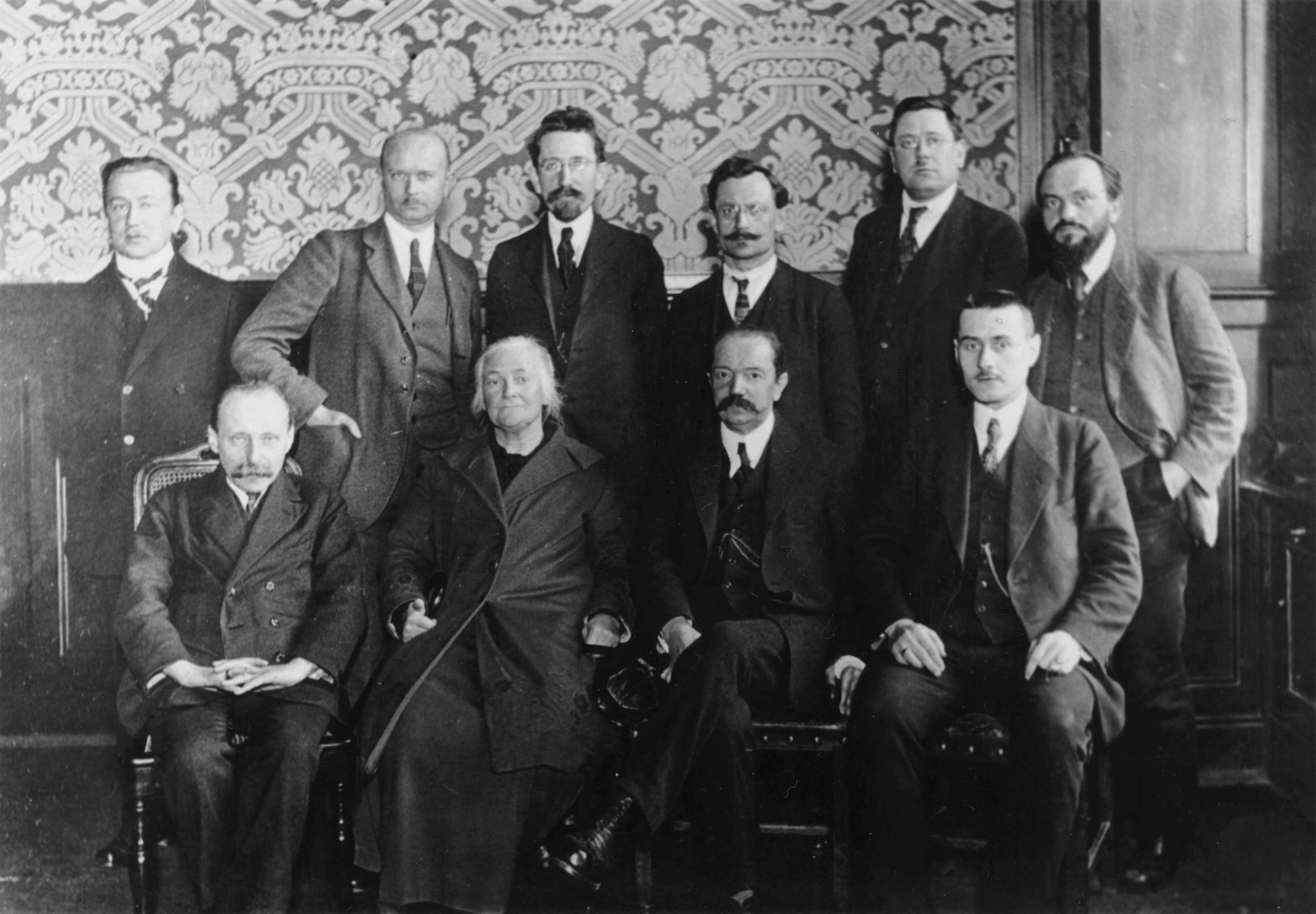
Members of the Reichstag faction of the KPD c. 1921. Sitting from left to right: Joseph Herzfeld, Clara Zetkin, Emil Eichhorn, Georg Berthelé. Standing from left to right: Max Heydemann, Walter Stoecker, Wilhelm Koenen, Wilhelm Bartz, Heinrich Malzahn, Paul Frölich.

Through the 1920s, the KPD was racked by internal conflict between radical and moderate factions, partly reflecting the power struggles between Joseph Stalin and Grigory Zinoviev in Moscow. Germany was seen as being of central importance to the struggle for socialism, and the failure of the German revolution was a major setback. Eventually Levi was expelled in 1921 by the Comintern for "indiscipline". Further leadership changes took place in the 1920s. Supporters of the Left or Right Opposition to the Stalinist-controlled Comintern leadership were expelled; of these, Heinrich Brandler, August Thalheimer and Paul Frölich set up a splinter Communist Party Opposition in 1928.

The leadership of the German Communist party had requested that Moscow send Leon Trotsky to Germany to direct the 1923 insurrection. However, this proposal was rejected by the Politburo which was controlled by Stalin, Zinoviev and Kamenev who decided to send a commission of lower-ranking Russian Communist party members.

During the years of the Weimar Republic, the KPD was the largest communist party in Europe and seen as the "leading party" of the communist movement outside of the Soviet Union. The party abandoned the goal of immediate revolution, and from 1924 onwards contested Reichstag elections, with some success.

=== Fischer and Thälmann leaderships and the united front ===
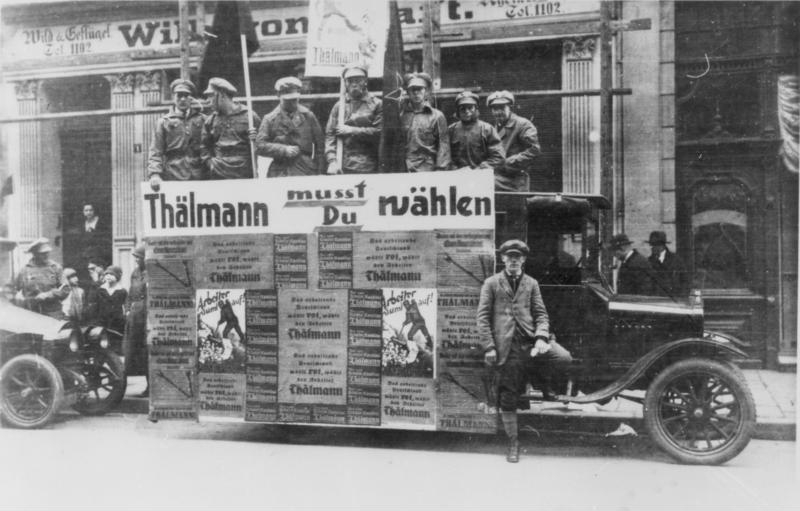
KPD in Essen, 1925

A new KPD leadership was elected in 1923. The party's left around Ruth Fischer, Arkadi Maslow and Werner Scholem took leadership of the KPD in 1924; Ernst Thälmann was allied to this faction and became a member of the politburo and was appointed KPD vice-chairman in January 1924. Stalin engineered the Fischer leadership's removal in August 1925, and installed Thälmann as party chairman.

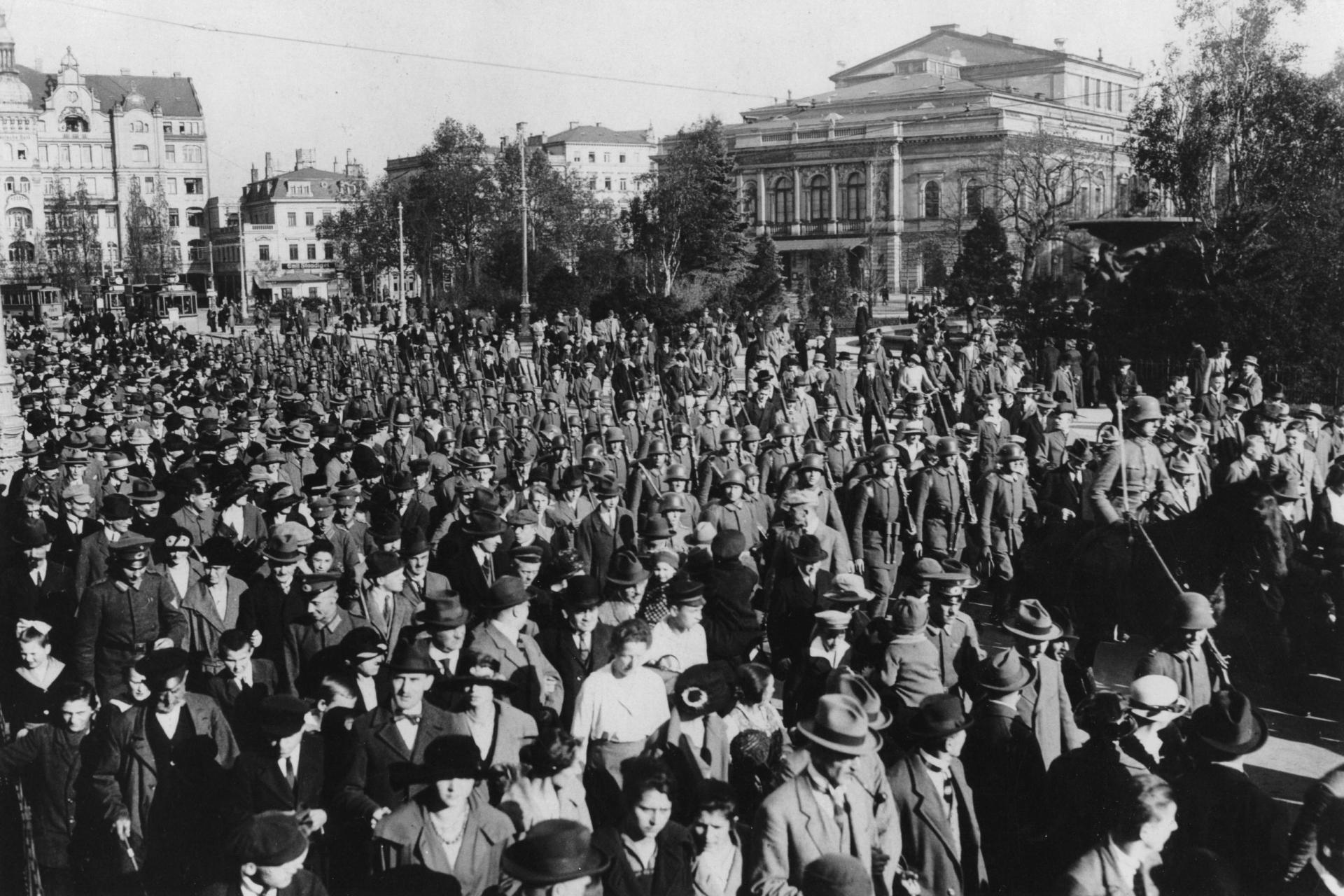
Reichswehr soldiers marching toward the federal parliament in Dresden, Saxony, to depose the state government led by a KPD-SPD coalition

From 1923 to 1928, the KPD broadly followed the united front policy developed in the early 1920s of working with other working class and socialist parties to contest elections, pursue social struggles and fight the rising right-wing militias. For example, in October 1923 the KPD formed a coalition government with the SPD in the states of Saxony and Thuringia. However, the Reichswehr legally overthrew these governments by force, through a constitutional process called Reichsexekution. In 1926 the KPD worked with the SPD on a referendum to expropriate the German nobility, together mobilising 14.4 million voters.

The party's first paramilitary wing was the Roter Frontkämpferbund (Alliance of Red Front Fighters), which was founded in 1924 but banned by the governing Social Democrats in 1929.

By 1927, the party had 130,000 members, of whom 40,000 had been members in 1920. From 1928 onwards (after Stalin reinstated Thälmann as KPD leader against the majority of the KPD central committee in the wake of an embezzlement scandal involving Thälmann's ally John Wittorf), the party followed the Comintern line and received funding from the Comintern. Under Thälmann's leadership, the party was closely aligned with the Soviet leadership headed by Joseph Stalin; Thälmann has been described as "the driving force behind Stalinization in the mid to late 1920s" and "Stalin's right hand in Germany". After winning control from his former leftist allies, he expelled the party's Right Opposition around Heinrich Brandler.

=== The Third Period and "social fascism" ===
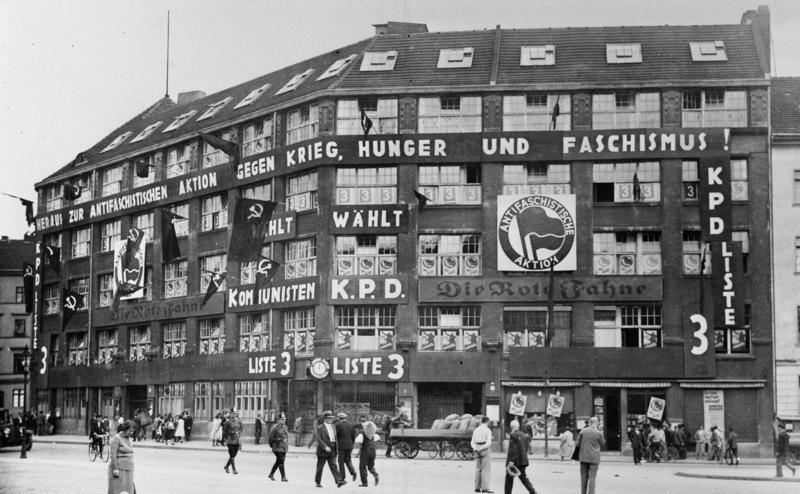
Karl-Liebknecht-Haus, the KPD's headquarters from 1926 to 1933. The Antifaschistische Aktion (abbr. "Antifa") logo can be seen prominently displayed on the front of the building.

After the 1928 Reichstag election, the KPD with 54 seats remained one of the largest and most politically potent Communist parties in Europe. Led now by Thälmann, who supported a close alignment with the Soviet Union and the Communist International (Comintern). At the time, the Comintern held the position that social democracy was social fascism and that it frustrated rather than helped the proletariat. As a result, the KPD under Thälmann had a hostile, confrontational attitude toward the Social Democratic Party of Germany (SPD) as defenders of the capitalist status quo. Their perception was reinforced by the explicit anti-Communist views of numerous SPD politicians in the German and Prussian governments, including Chancellor Hermann Müller, Interior Minister Carl Severing, Prussian Minister President Otto Braun, Prussian Interior Minister Albert Grzesinski and Berlin Police chief Karl Zörgiebel.

In the lead-up to the 1929 celebration of International Workers' Day, SPD Minister Grzesinski threatened to ban the KPD and its organizations if they acted in defiance of a ban on public gatherings in Berlin ordered by the city's police chief Karl Zörgiebel of the SPD. The attempted banning galvanized the KPD, who responded by exhorting workers to defy the ban and organize peacefully, but to be prepared to strike on 2 May "if Zörgiebel dares to spill workers' blood". The KPD proceeded with May Day marches in Berlin.

The Berlin Police responded with an immediate, harsh, and disproportionate crackdown. Often without regard to whether the persons involved were demonstrators or bystanders, they forcibly and violently dispersed the crowds that formed. As the day progressed, street battles developed between the protestors and the police, who used firearms and armoured cars. The violence lasted until the afternoon of 3 May, mostly in the working-class neighbourhoods of Wedding and Neukölln.

An estimated 33 civilians, none of whom were involved with the KPD, were killed, 200 injured, and over a thousand people taken into police custody, many of whom were also not involved in the initial KPD rallies. Only 66 of those arrested were charged and 44 convicted.

The events of Blutmai deepened the split between the SPD and KPD, the two major left-wing parties of the Weimar Republic, making a united stand against the growing strength of far-right parties more difficult.

Tensions soured, the KPD in turn began aligning with the Comintern's Third Period, under the slogan "Class against class", the KPD turned to viewing the Social Democratic Party of Germany (SPD) as its main adversary. The term social fascism was introduced to the German Communist Party shortly after the Hamburg Uprising of 1923 and gradually became ever more influential in the party; by 1929 it was being propagated as a theory. The KPD regarded itself as "the only anti-fascist party" in Germany and held that all other parties in the Weimar Republic were "fascist". The Nazis achieved an electoral breakthrough in the 1930 Reichstag election.

By the early 1930s, the political situation in Weimar Germany was extremely unstable after the onset of the Great Depression. The effects of the Depression on Germany effectively destroyed the remaining legitimacy of the pro-democratic parties – such as the Social Democrats, the State Party, and the German People's Party – in favor of the anti-democratic parties. They also followed an increasingly nationalist course, trying to appeal to nationalist-leaning workers.

In 1931, the party reported a membership of 200,000.

The KPD leadership initially first criticised but then supported the 1931 Prussian Landtag referendum, an unsuccessful attempt launched by the far-right Stahlhelm to bring down the social democrat state government of Prussia by means of a plebiscite.

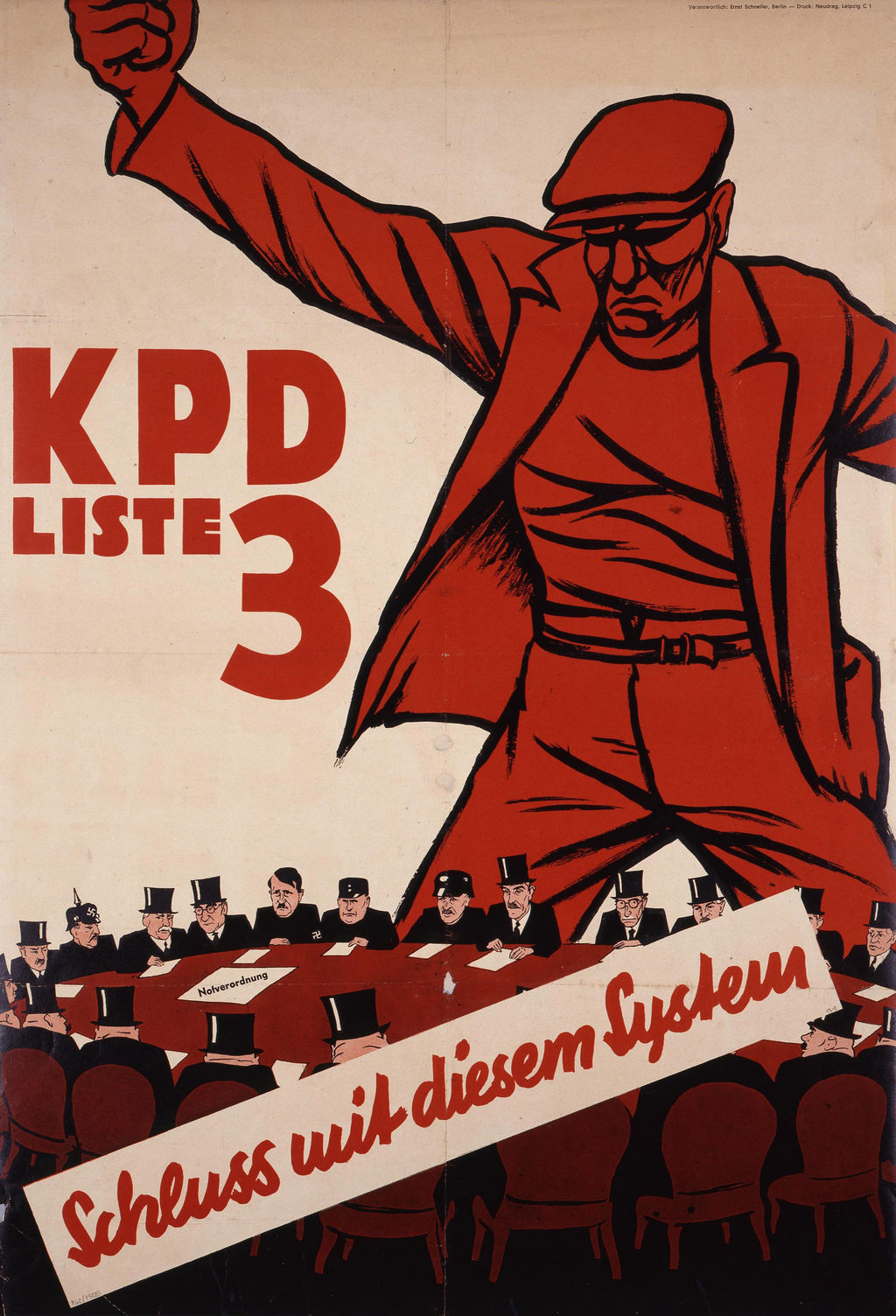
KPD election poster, 1932. The caption at the bottom reads: "An end to this system!"

The KPD maintained a solid electoral performance, usually polling more than 10% of the vote. It gained 100 deputies in the November 1932 elections, getting 16% of the vote and coming third. In the presidential election of the same year, its candidate Thälmann took 13.2% of the vote, compared to Hitler's 30.1%. In this period, while also opposed to the Nazis, the KPD regarded the Nazi Party as a less sophisticated and thus less dangerous fascist party than the SPD, and KPD leader Ernst Thälmann declared that "some Nazi trees must not be allowed to overshadow a forest [of social democrats]".

Critics of the KPD accused it of having pursued a sectarian policy. For example, the Social Democratic Party criticized the KPD's thesis of "social fascism", and both Leon Trotsky from the Comintern's Left Opposition and August Thalheimer of the Right Opposition continued to argue for a united front. Critics believed that the KPD's sectarianism scuttled any possibility of a united front with the SPD against the rising power of the National Socialists.

Thälmann claimed that the right-wing leadership of the SPD rejected and actively worked against the KPD's efforts to form a united front against fascism. The party itself, however, continued to publicly clash with the SPD and the General German Trade Union Federation well into 1932.

A brawl between Nazi and KPD lawmakers in the Landtag of Prussia led to the creation of Antifa – short Antifaschistische Aktion, which the party itself described as a "red united front under the leadership of the only anti-fascist party, the KPD". Thälmann, however, reiterated that there was still a 'principal fight' to be led against the SPD and that there would be no 'unity at all costs'.

After Franz von Papen's government carried out a coup d'état in Prussia, the KPD issued a call for all workers to support a general strike under its own leadership, which only resulted in limited local action. The statement was added with a short call on the GGTUF, the SPD and the General Federation of Free Employees to join in, but the KPD's belief that social democrats would have to be 'coerced by the masses' meant that their leaders were never approached directly. The KPD tried the same tactic again after Adolf Hitler was appointed as chancellor but was widely ignored by other organizations and individual workers this time as well.

== Nazi era ==
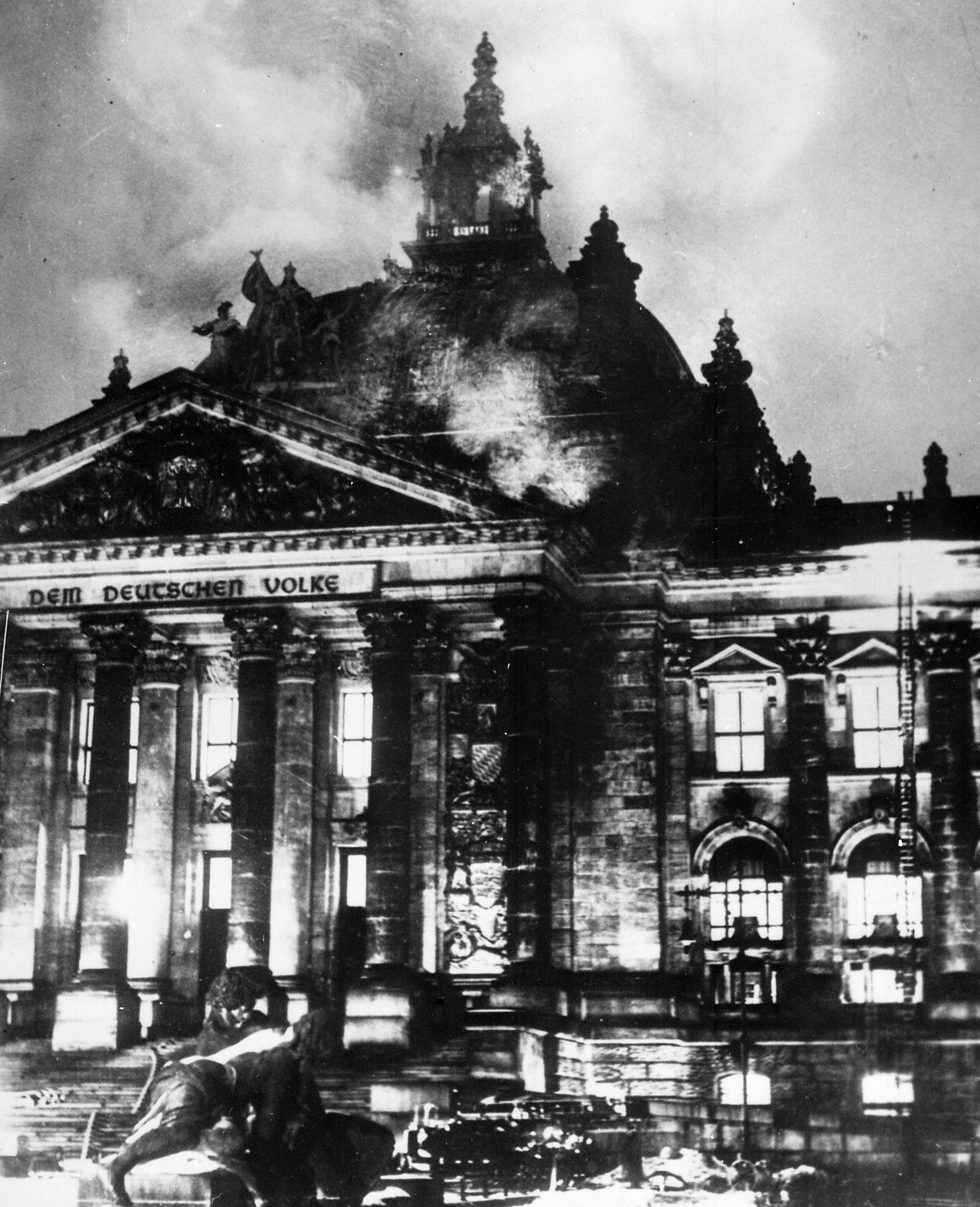
The Reichstag building on fire, 27 February 1933

On 27 February, soon after the appointment of Adolf Hitler as chancellor, the Reichstag was set on fire and Dutch council communist Marinus van der Lubbe was found near the building. The Nazis publicly blamed the fire on communist agitators in general, although in a German court in 1933, it was decided that van der Lubbe had acted alone, as he claimed to have done. The following day, Hitler persuaded Hindenburg to issue the Reichstag Fire Decree. It used the provisions of Article 48 of the Weimar Constitution to suspend key civil liberties, ostensibly to deal with Communist acts of violence.

Repression began within hours of the fire, when police arrested dozens of communists. Although Hitler could have formally banned the KPD, he did not do so right away. Not only was he reluctant to chance a violent uprising, but he believed the KPD could siphon off SPD votes and split the left. However, most judges held the KPD responsible for the fire, and took the line that KPD membership was in and of itself a treasonous act. At the March 1933 election, the KPD elected 81 deputies. However, it was an open secret that they would never be allowed to take up their seats; they were all arrested in short order. For all intents and purposes, the KPD was "outlawed" on the day the Reichstag Fire Decree was issued, and "completely banned" as of 6 March, the day after the election.

Shortly after the election, the Nazis pushed through the Enabling Act, which allowed the cabinet–in practice, Hitler–to enact laws without the involvement of the Reichstag, effectively giving Hitler dictatorial powers. Since the bill was effectively a constitutional amendment, a quorum of two-thirds of the entire Reichstag had to be present in order to formally call up the bill. Leaving nothing to chance, Reichstag President Hermann Göring did not count the KPD seats for purposes of obtaining the required quorum. This led historian Richard J. Evans to contend that the Enabling Act had been passed in a manner contrary to law. The Nazis did not need to count the KPD deputies for purposes of getting a super-majority of two-thirds of those deputies present and voting. However, Evans argued, not counting the KPD deputies for purposes of a quorum amounted to "refusing to recognize their existence", and was thus "an illegal act".

The KPD was efficiently suppressed by the Nazis. The most senior KPD leaders were Wilhelm Pieck and Walter Ulbricht, who went into exile in the Soviet Union. The KPD maintained an underground organization in Germany throughout the Nazi period, but the loss of many core members severely weakened the Party's infrastructure.

=== KPD leaders purged by Stalin ===
A number of senior KPD leaders in exile were caught up in Joseph Stalin's Great Purge of 1937–1938 and executed, among them Hugo Eberlein, Heinz Neumann, Hermann Remmele, Hans Kippenberger, Fritz Schulte and Hermann Schubert, or sent to the gulag, like Margarete Buber-Neumann. Still others, like Gustav von Wangenheim and Erich Mielke (later the head of the Stasi in East Germany), denounced their fellow exiles to the NKVD.

== Post-war history ==
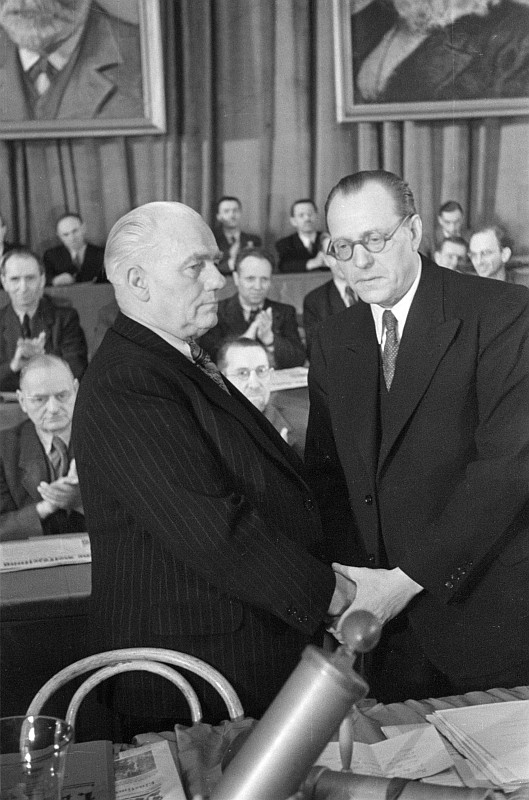
Wilhelm Pieck and Otto Grotewohl shake hands at the 1946 Unification Congress of the SED.

In East Germany, the Soviet Military Administration in Germany forced the eastern branch of the SPD to merge with the KPD (led by Pieck and Ulbricht) to form the Socialist Unity Party (SED) in April 1946. Although nominally a union of equals, the SED quickly fell under communist domination, and most of the more recalcitrant members from the SPD side of the merger were pushed out in short order. By the time of the formal formation of the East German state in 1949, the SED was a full-fledged Communist party, and developed along lines similar to other Soviet-bloc communist parties. It was the ruling party in East Germany from its formation in 1949 until 1989. The SPD managed to preserve its independence in East Berlin, forcing the SED to form a small branch in West Berlin, the Socialist Unity Party of West Berlin.

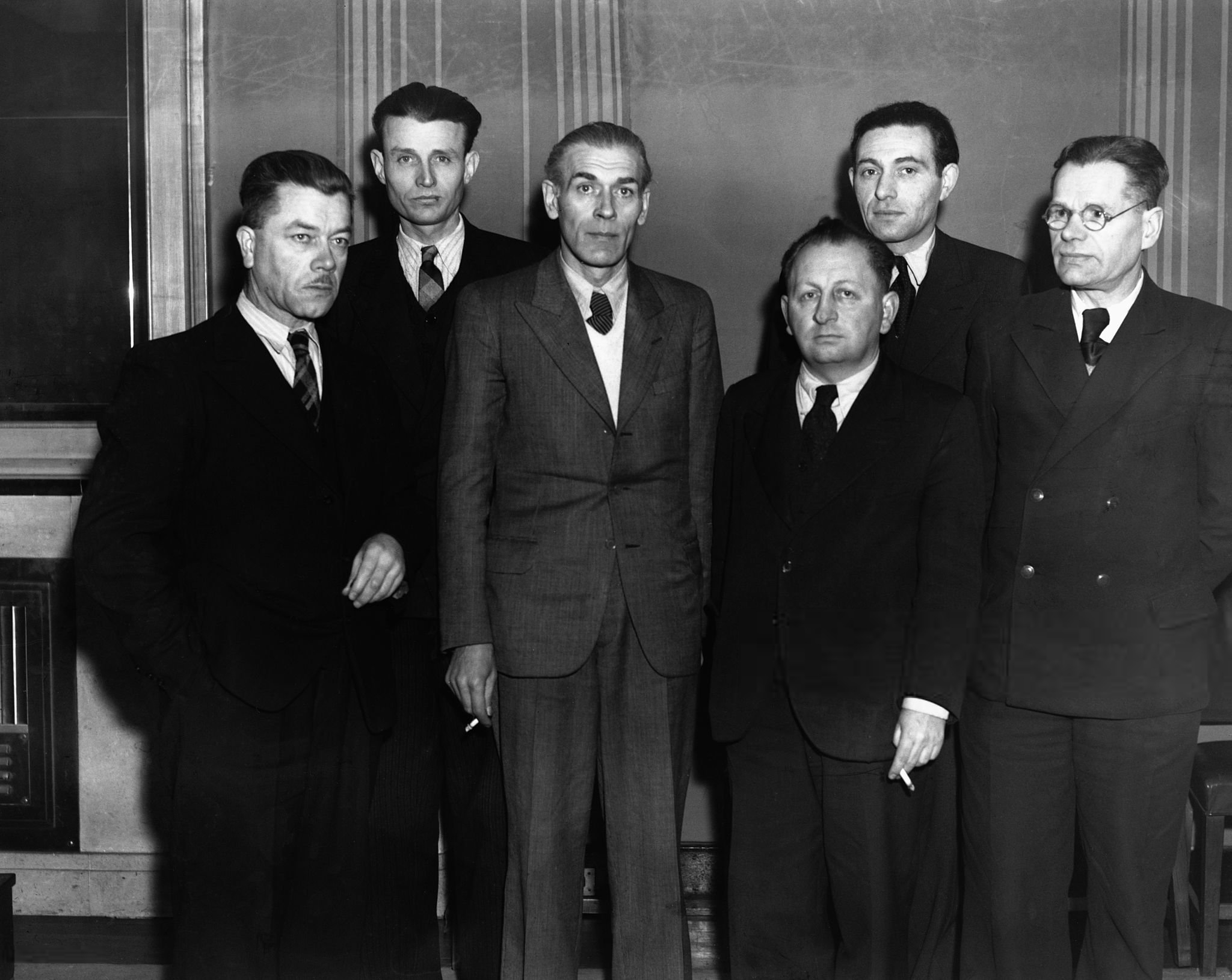
Members of the West German KPD at a meeting in London, 28 February 1947. Standing from left to right: Albert Buchmann, Willi Agatz, Max Reimann, unknown, Leo Bauer, and Gustav Gundelach.

The KPD reorganized in the western part of Germany, and received 5.7 percent of the vote in the first Bundestag election in 1949. But the onset of the Cold War and the subsequent widespread repression of the far-left soon caused a collapse in the party's support. The reputation of the party had also been damaged by the conduct of the Red Army during its occupation of eastern Germany, which included looting, political repression, and mass rape. On orders from Joseph Stalin, the Communist deputies to the Parlamentarischer Rat refused to sign West Germany's Basic Law to avoid recognizing the political legitimacy of West Germany. At the 1953 election the KPD only won 2.2 percent of the total votes and lost all of its seats, never to return. The party was banned in August 1956 by the Federal Constitutional Court of Germany. The decision was upheld in 1957 by the European Commission of Human Rights in Communist Party of Germany v. the Federal Republic of Germany.

After the party was declared illegal, many of its members continued to function clandestinely despite increased government surveillance. Part of its membership re-founded the party in 1968 as the German Communist Party (DKP). Following German reunification many DKP members joined the new Party of Democratic Socialism, formed out of the remains of the SED. In 1968, another self-described successor to the KPD was formed, the Communist Party of Germany/Marxists–Leninists (KPD/ML), which followed Maoist and later Hoxhaist ideas. It went through multiple splits and united with a Trotskyist group in 1986 to form the Unified Socialist Party (VSP), which failed to gain any influence and dissolved in the early 1990s. However, multiple tiny splinter groups originating from the KPD/ML still exist, several of which claim the name of KPD. Another party claiming the KPD name was formed in 1990 in East Berlin by several hard line communists who had been expelled from the PDS, including Erich Honecker. The KPD (Bolshevik) split off from the East German KPD in 2005, bringing the total number of active KPDs to at least five (more or less).

The Left, formed out of a merger between the PDS and Labour and Social Justice – The Electoral Alternative in 2007, claims to be the historical successor of the KPD (by way of the PDS).

== Organization ==
In the early 1920s, the party operated under the principle of democratic centralism, whereby different tendencies could confront each other and vote on different programmes and candidates that the entire party would then follow. The leading body of the party was the Congress, meeting at least once a year. Between Congresses, leadership of the party resided in the Zentrale (literally "Headquarters"), equivalent to the Central Committee of the CPSU, elected directly by the Congress whose members had to live where the leadership was resident. However, the supreme body was the Zentralausschuss (literally "Central Commission"), equivalent to the Central Control Commission of the CPSU, also elected at the Congress but mostly nominated from local districts representing the wider party. In 1920, the Zentrale (mirroring its Russian counterpart) split itself into two bodies: a Political Bureau (Politburo) and an Organization Bureau (Orgburo). Elected figures were subject to recall by the bodies that elected them. (Note: Broue cites the cases of Freisland and Ernst Meyer as being recalled when their electors were not satisfied with their actions.)

In 1925, the party was reorganized under Comintern supervision. The Zentrale was replaced by a Central Committee, and the Zentralausschuss was abolished. Over time, the Central Committee grew in number and met less frequently, leaving the day-to-day decision-making to the Politburo and the Orgburo; the latter was abolished in 1926 and its responsibilities taken over by the Secretariat, equivalent to the Secretariat of the CPSU and comprising just three or four members. This became the supreme body of the party. Congresses also met less frequently (the last was in 1929), and election of local leaders was shifted from local party congresses to local party committees.

The KPD was divided into a number of regional Bezirke (districts). At the head of each was a Polleiter (political leader) and Orgleiter (organizational leader), mirroring the national leadership. Charged with "direct[ing], supervis[ing] and link[ing] up the work of all departments and organs," the Polleiters wielded a substantial amount of power, even moreso after Ernst Thälmann consolidated his position as party leader in 1929. As of 28 February 1933, when the Reichstag Fire Decree was issued and the party was effectively banned, there were 24 active Bezirke. (Note: Bezirk Ruhr was formed in 1921 from the merger of Bezirke West-Westfalen (West Westphalia) and Ost-Westfalen (East Westphalia). Bezirk Sachsen (Saxony) was formed in 1929 from the merger of Bezirke Ostsachsen (East Saxony), Westsachsen (West Saxony) and Erzgebirge-Vogtland. Bezirk Baden-Pfalz (Baden-Palatinate) was formed in 1930 from the merger of Bezirke Baden and Pfalz (Palatinate). Another Bezirk, Lausitz (Lusatia), was merged with Bezirk Berlin-Brandenburg after 1921. Hessen-Kassel (Hesse-Kassel) was known as Hessen-Waldeck (Hesse-Waldeck) before 1929.)

Bezirk Polleiters as of the Reichstag Fire Decree
Bezirk	Polleiter	Incumbent since	Notes	Sources
Berlin-Brandenburg	Wilhelm Florin	1932	Orgleiter was Artur Vogt.	
Pommern (Pomerania)	Werner Kraus	1931	Orgleiter was Friedrich Wetzel.	
Ostpreußen (East Prussia)	Hermann Matern	1931	Orgleiter was Albert Schettkat.	
Danzig	Otto Giesselmann	1931	Orgleiter was Anton Plenikowski as of 1929.	
Schlesien (Silesia)	Augustin Sandtner	1932		
Oberschlesien (Upper Silesia)	Paul Wojtkowski	1931	Orgleiter was Franz Wuttke.	
Sachsen (Saxony)	Fritz Selbmann	1931	Orgleiter was Karl Ferlemann.	
Halle-Merseburg	Paul Suhr	1932		
Magdeburg-Anhalt	Walter Kaßner	1930		
Thüringen (Thuringia)	Walter Duddins	1930	Orgleiter was Richard Eyermann.	
Niedersachsen (Lower Saxony)	John Schehr	1930	Polleiter as of 1932. Orgleiter was Max Lademann.	
Mecklenburg	Johann Sawadzki	1932	Orgleiter was Hans Warnke.	
Wasserkante (Waterfront: Hamburg-Schleswig-Holstein)	Anton Saefkow	1932	Orgleiter was Hans Sahling.	
Nordwest (Northwest: Bremen)	Robert Stamm	1930	Orgleiter was Heinrich Schramm.	
Ruhrgebiet (Ruhr area)	Max Opitz	1932		
Niederrhein (Lower Rhine)	Lambert Horn	1932	Orgleiter was Rudolf Hennig.	
Mittelrhein (Middle Rhine)	Bernhard Bästlein	1931		
Hessen-Kassel (Hesse-Kassel)	Karl Barthel	1931		
Hessen-Frankfurt (Hesse-Frankfurt)	Albert Kuntz	1932	Orgleiter was Wilhelm Beutel.	
Saargebiet (Saar area)	Paul Lorenz	1930		
Baden-Pfalz (Baden-Palatinate)	Franz Doll	1932	Orgleiter was Karl Schneck.	
Württemberg	Albert Buchmann	1932	Orgleiter was Eugen Wiedmaier as of January 1933.	
Nord-Bayern (North Bavaria)	Jakob Boulanger	1927	Orgleiter was Hermann Schirmer.	
Süd-Bayern (South Bavaria)	Hans Beimler	1932		

The KPD employed around about 200 full-timers during its early years of existence, and as Broue notes "They received the pay of an average skilled worker, and had no privileges, apart from being the first to be arrested, prosecuted and sentenced, and when shooting started, to be the first to fall".

== Party leadership ==
- Karl Liebknecht and Rosa Luxemburg (1919)
- Leo Jogiches (1919)
- Paul Levi (1919–1921)
- Paul Levi and Ernst Däumig (1921)
- Heinrich Brandler and Walter Stoecker (1921–1922)
- Ernst Meyer (1922)
- Heinrich Brandler (1922–1924)
- Hermann Remmele (1924)
- Arkadi Maslow and Ruth Fischer (1924–1925)
- Ernst Thälmann (1925–1933)
- John Schehr (1933–1934)
- Wilhelm Pieck (1934–1946) (Note: Ernst Thälmann, who the Gestapo had arrested on 3 March 1933, remained de jure party leader until his execution on 18 August 1944; Schehr and later Pieck were acting chairmen as deputy leaders.)
- Max Reimann (1946–1956)

== Election results ==
=== Federal elections ===
KPD federal election results (1920–1953)
Election	Votes			Seats		Notes
Election	No.	%	+/–	No.	+/–	Notes
1920	589.454	2.1 (No. 8)		4 / 459		Boycotted the previous election
May 1924	3.693.280	12.6 (No. 4)	▲10.5	62 / 472	▲58	After the merger with the left wing of the USPD
December 1924	2.709.086	8.9 (No. 5)	▼3.7	45 / 493	▼17	
1928	3.264.793	10.6 (No. 4)	▲1.7	54 / 491	▲9	
1930	4.590.160	13.1 (No. 3)	▲2.5	77 / 577	▲23	After the financial crisis
July 1932	5.282.636	14.3 (No. 3)	▲1.2	89 / 608	▲12	
November 1932	5.980.239	16.9 (No. 3)	▲2.6	100 / 584	▲11	
March 1933	4.848.058	12.3 (No. 3)	▼4.6	81 / 647	▼19	During Hitler's term as Chancellor of Germany
1949	1.361.706	5.7 (No. 5)	▼6.6	15 / 402	▼66	First West German federal election
1953	607.860	2.2 (No. 8)	▼3.5	0 / 402	▼15	

=== Presidential elections ===
KPD federal election results (1925–1932)
Election	Votes		Candidate
Election	No.	%	Candidate
1925	1,871,815 (1st round); 1,931,151 (2nd round)	7.0 (No. 4); 6.4 (No. 3)	Ernst Thälmann
1932	4,938,341 (1st round); 3,706,759 (2nd round)	13.2 (No. 3); 10.2 (No. 3)	Ernst Thälmann

== See also ==
- Roter Soldatenbund
- Proletarische Hundertschaften
- Roter Frontkämpferbund
- Kampfbund gegen den Faschismus
- Antimilitärischer Apparat
- Parteiselbstschutz
- Deutsche Tscheka
- Rote Hilfe
- Communist Party Opposition
- Communist Workers' Party of Germany
- Freies Volk
- German resistance
- German Revolution of 1918–1919
- Hotel Lux, Moscow hotel where many German party members lived in exile
- Socialist Workers' Party of Germany
- Sozialistische Volkszeitung
- Spartacus League
- Union of Manual and Intellectual Workers

== Sources ==
- Bowlby, Chris (March 1986). "Blutmai 1929: Police, Parties and Proletarians in a Berlin Confrontation". The Historical Journal. 29 (1): 137–158. doi:10.1017/s0018246x00018653. JSTOR 2639259. S2CID 159528044.
- Broué, Pierre (1975). The German Revolution 1917–1923. Chicago: Haymarket Books.
- Fowkes, Ben (1984). Communism in Germany Under the Weimar Republic (PDF). London: Macmillan Publishers.
- Rosenhaft, Eve (1983). Beating the Fascists?: The German Communists and Political Violence 1929–1933. Cambridge University Press. p. 32. ISBN 9780521236386.
