= Gustav Gundelach =

German politician (1888–1962)

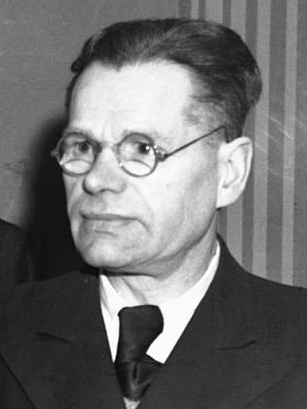
- Gundelach in 1947

Member of the Bundestag
- In office 7 September 1949 – 7 September 1953

Personal details
- Born: 19 December 1888 Kiel
- Died: 8 July 1962 (aged 73) Hamburg
- Party: KPD

Gustav Rudolf August Gundelach (19 December 1888 – 8 July 1962) was a German politician of the Communist Party (KPD) and former member of the German Bundestag.

== Life ==
He was a member of the Hamburg State Parliament for the KPD in the first legislative period after the war. In June 1947 he resigned from the Bürgerschaft as a member of parliament. Gundelach was then a member of the Zone Advisory Council in 1947/48. He was a member of the German Bundestag in the first legislative period (1949-1953).

== Literature ==
Herbst, Ludolf; Jahn, Bruno (2002). Vierhaus, Rudolf (ed.). Biographisches Handbuch der Mitglieder des Deutschen Bundestages. 1949–2002 [Biographical Handbook of the Members of the German Bundestag. 1949–2002] (in German). München: De Gruyter - De Gruyter Saur. p. 1715. ISBN 978-3-11-184511-1.
