= Freies Volk =

West German newspaper in Düsseldorf (1949–56)

- Type: Daily
- Founded: 3 January 1949
- Political alignment: Communist Party of Germany
- Language: German language
- Headquarters: Düsseldorf
- OCLC number: 311111248

Freies Volk ('Free People') was a newspaper published daily from Düsseldorf, West Germany 1949-1956. Freies Volk was printed at Freier Verlag GmbH, Ackerstrasse 114.

The first issue of Freies Volk was published on 3 January 1949. Freies Volk replaced Die Freiheit, an organ of the Communist Party of Germany (KPD) in Düsseldorf that had been banned in October 1948, following sharp criticisms against the Allied occupation powers. Freies Volk carried the by-line 'People's Newspaper for the Rhine-Westphalian Industrial Region'. On 1 September 1949 Freies Volk became the central organ of the Communist Party. At the time it had a circulation of 80,000. Hugo Erlich was named as the editor in chief of Freies Volk.

Publication of Freies Volk was suspended by the Allied occupation authorities in August 1950, following the article "Now It's Tanks and Poison Gas instead of Cigarettes | Bonn as Go-Between in US Arms Trade". Publication of the newspaper was resumed in November 1950. In 1951 Franz Ahrens became the editor in chief of Freies Volk.

In mid-1954 Fritz Bäsel was appointed editor in chief of the newspaper. Soon thereafter he was replaced by Max Schäfer, a key ideologue of the party. Schäfer remained in that post until the party was banned. By 1955 the daily circulation had decreased to 48,000. After the ban of the Communist Party on 17 August 1956, Freies Volk continued publication as an illegal weekly organ of the now underground party. As of 1970 Freies Volk was still being published, albeit irregularly and being edited and printed outside of West Germany.
