= 1931 Prussian Landtag referendum =

German referendum

The 1931 Prussian Landtag referendum was an attempt to prematurely dissolve the sitting session of the Landtag (parliament) of the Weimar German state of Prussia. The referendum, which took place according to Article 6 of the 1920 Prussian Constitution, was triggered by a petition launched in the spring of 1931 by the anti-republican veterans' organization Der Stahlhelm. It was supported by several right-wing parties including the Nazis, as well as by the Communist Party of Germany (KPD). Even though 93.9% of those voting on 9 August 1931 opted to dissolve the Landtag, the referendum failed because the turnout of 39.2% did not meet the minimum 50% requirement.

== Background ==
After the national Reichstag elections of 1930 in which the Nazis became the second strongest party after the Social Democrats (SPD), Prussia was considered a bulwark of German democracy due to its stable, mostly SPD-led governments. Attacks from both the extreme left and extreme right against the government of SPD Minister President Otto Braun consequently intensified. Under the pressure that Reich President Paul von Hindenburg exerted through German Chancellor Heinrich Brüning and his interior minister Joseph Wirth, Der Stahlhelm was allowed back into Prussia in the summer of 1930 following an earlier ban. At the Reichsfrontsoldatentag ("Reich Front-Line Soldiers' Day") in Koblenz on 4 October that was attended by over 100,000 supporters, Franz Seldte, the leader of Der Stahlhelm, sharply attacked the "Marxist" Prussian government and announced a referendum for the premature dissolution of the Prussian Landtag that had been elected on 20 May 1928.

== The petition ==
A petition for the dissolution was approved by Prussian Interior Minister Carl Severing (SPD) on 4 March 1931. The referendum was supported in the Landtag by the right-wing German National People's Party (DNVP), the German People's Party (DVP) and a number of smaller parties. Shortly before the start of the registration period for the petition, Adolf Hitler also called for support on behalf of the Nazi Party (NSDAP).

At the end of the registration period, 5.96 million eligible voters had expressed their support for the referendum. The number was only slightly more than the required 20% (5.27 million). The result was disappointing for the initiators due to the fact that it fell well short of the Prussian votes in the 1930 Reichstag election.

The Prussian Landtag debated the referendum on 8 and 9 July 1931. The proposed dissolution was rejected by the coalition parties SPD, Centre Party and German State Party (229 votes) against the "yes" votes of the NSDAP, DNVP, KPD, DVP and several smaller parties (190 votes). Because the Landtag had rejected voluntary dissolution, the referendum was scheduled for 9 August.

== Support from the Communist Party and Comintern ==
Logo of the Communist Party of Germany

When Der Stahlhelm announced the referendum drive in October 1930, the KPD was initially unwilling to support it. This was despite the fact that, according to Comintern documents, the option of ousting Braun's Social Democratic cabinet by referendum had been discussed independently of Moscow long before the summer of 1931. Executive Committee member Hermann Remmele had also suggested at a KPD leadership meeting in January 1931 that they should pre-empt the right-wing parties by holding their own referendum to dissolve the Landtag. The party's initial hesitation was the result of the lack of support from the KPD district secretaries who wanted to show consideration for the Social Democratic working class.

Given the relatively low turnout for the petition, the republican forces thought that they could look forward to the referendum with relative confidence. That changed on 22 July 1931 when the KPD announced its support for the referendum. The decision reflected the Communists' priority at the time in fighting the SPD, which had been labeled "social fascist", and was fully in accord with the line that the Executive Committee of the Comintern had laid down in the spring of 1931. Behind the KPD's decision were its chairman Heinz Neumann, the Comintern and Joseph Stalin, who had exerted considerable influence on the decision.

== The referendum ==
On 6 August 1931, shortly before the vote, the Prussian government addressed the public: "Those who want a soviet Prussia or a fascist Prussia and thus fratricidal war in their own country should vote yes in the referendum; those who, on the other hand, are in favor of the social and democratic expansion of the German republic and the Free State of Prussia should stay away from the referendum."

The referendum of 9 August 1931 failed. The tally showed 9.8 million votes in favor, which was 93.9% of those who had voted but only 37.1% of those eligible to vote. 13.4 million votes, or more than 50% of eligible voters, were needed. Many Communists in particular had not participated in the referendum. The democratic camp celebrated the failure of the referendum as a success for the Republic, while the official historiography of the East German Central Committee of the Socialist Unity Party of Germany (SED) in 1966 described the participation of the KPD as a momentous mistake.
