= Joseph Herzfeld =

German politician

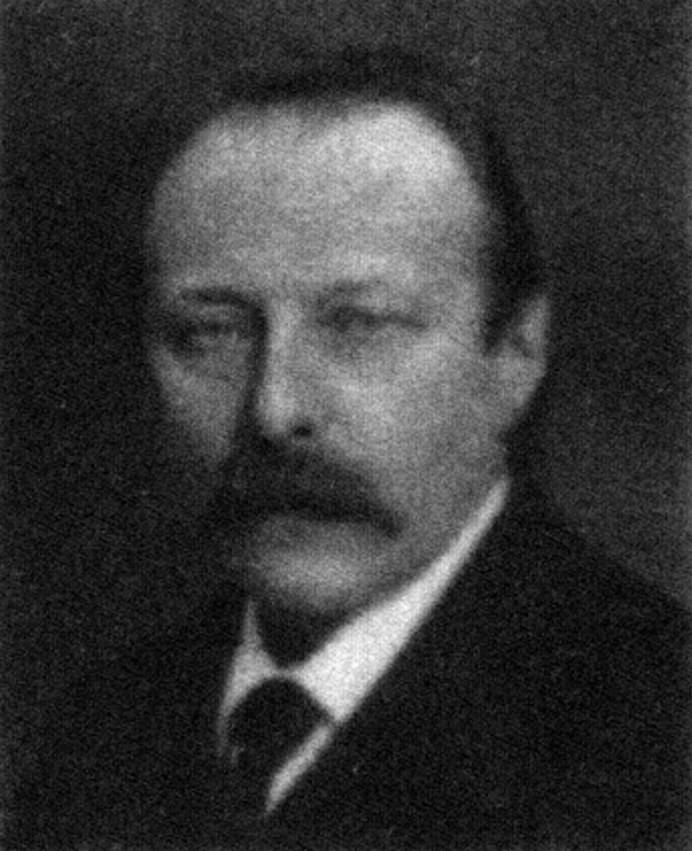
Herzfeld c. 1920

Joseph Herzfeld (18 December 1853 – 27 July 1939) was a German politician.

== Biogrpahy ==
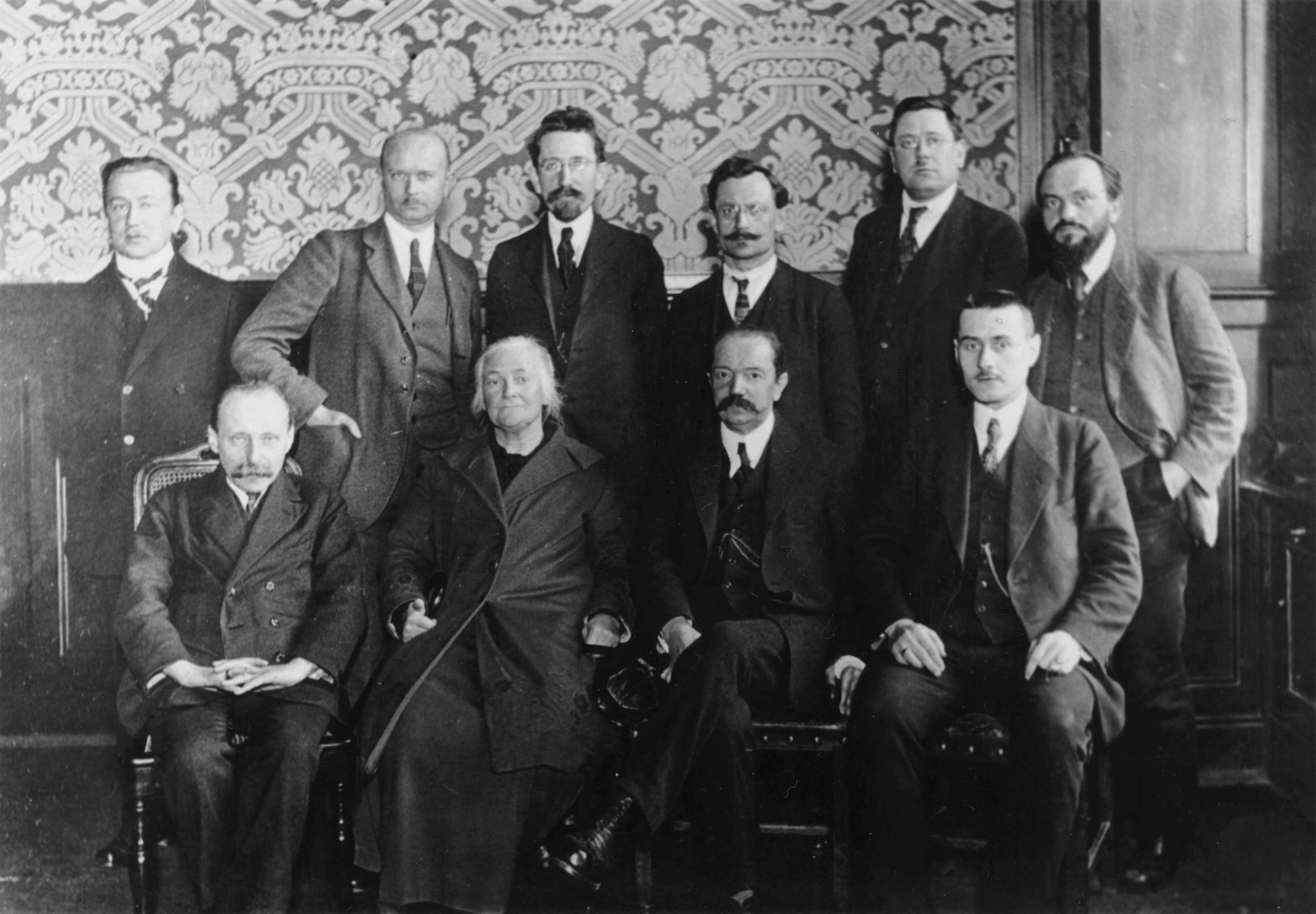
Members of the Reichstag faction of the KPD c. 1921. Sitting from left to right: Joseph Herzfeld, Clara Zetkin, Emil Eichhorn, Georg Berthelé. Standing from left to right: Max Heydemann, Walter Stoecker, Wilhelm Koenen, Wilhelm Bartz, Heinrich Malzahn, Paul Frölich.

Born in Neuss, Herzfeld worked as a bank clerk in Düsseldorf, before moving to New York City, where he trained at the Columbia Law School. He practised law in New York until 1885, when he returned to Germany and studied law there. He received a doctorate in 1887, and set up his own legal practice in Berlin.

In 1887, Herzfeld joined the Social Democratic Party of Germany (SPD), and in 1898 he was elected to the Reichstag, representing Rostock. He served until 1906, and again from 1912 until 1918, and 1920 until 1924. He opposed World War I, joining the Social Democratic Working Group, and then becoming a founder of the Independent Social Democratic Party of Germany (USPD). Within the USPD, he advocated affiliation to the Communist International and, when that was rejected, joined the Communist Party of Germany (KPD).

Herzfeld remained a KPD member, devoting much of his time to the Rote Hilfe. He emigrated to Switzerland in 1933, to escape Nazi persecution, and died there in 1939.
