= Max Reimann =

German politician (1898–1977)

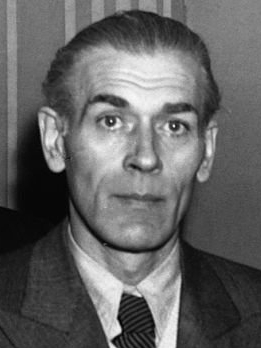
- Reimann in 1947

Chairman of the Communist Party of Germany
- In office (Note: Until 1948 there was no central party leadership in the three Western occupation zones. Reimann was Chairman of the KPD in the British occupation zone from 1946. He became Chairman of the KPD in 1948.); 1948 – 17 August 1956
- Preceded by: Wilhelm Pieck (1946)
- Succeeded by: Position abolished

Member of the Bundestag for North Rhine-Westphalia
- In office 7 September 1949 – 7 September 1953
- Preceded by: Constituency established
- Succeeded by: Multi-member district

Member of the Landtag of North Rhine-Westphalia
- In office 26 September 1946 – 4 July 1954
- Preceded by: Constituency established
- Succeeded by: Multi-member district

Personal details
- Born: 31 October 1898 Elbing, Province of West Prussia, Kingdom of Prussia, German Empire
- Died: 18 January 1977 (aged 78) Düsseldorf, North Rhine-Westphalia, West Germany
- Party: KPD (before 1956); DKP (after 1968)
- Other political affiliations: SED

Military service
- Allegiance: German Empire
- Branch: Imperial German Army
- War: World War I

Max Reimann (31 October 1898 – 18 January 1977) was a German communist politician and member of the Bundestag.

== Biography ==
Reimann was born in Elbing (Elbląg), West Prussia (today Poland) in to the family of a metalworker. He worked as a riveter at the Schichau yards in 1912–1916 and was drafted into the German Army in the First World War. In 1913, he became a member of the German Metal Workers' Union and the Socialist Labourers Youth, in 1916 of the Spartakusbund.

In 1918, he was sentenced to 1 year imprisonment for his participation in an anti-war demonstration at Elbing throughout the German revolution of 1918–1919. After his release from prison Reimann moved to Ahlen in 1920 to work as a miner, joined the German Coalminer Union and became a full-time official of the Communist Party of Germany (KPD) in 1921. Reimann fought against the French occupation of the Ruhr in 1923 and was imprisoned for a short time. Throughout the 1920s, he held several positions within the Revolutionäre Gewerkschafts Opposition (RGO), the communist union in the Ruhr area.

After the Nazis took over power in Germany in 1933 Reimann continued his work, now in illegal underground and became the head of the RGO in 1934. In 1935, Reimann was a delegate at the 7th World Congress of the Comintern in Moscow and later worked for the KPD-Foreign office in Prague. After Germany invaded Czechoslovakia in March 1939, Reimann was arrested on 4 April 1939 and imprisoned at Hamm Prison, Sachsenhausen concentration camp and Falkensee.

After the end of World War II, Reimann was a candidate of the Western KPD organization for the executive committee of the Socialist Unity Party of Germany (SED) but had to quit as the SED activities were limited to East Germany. In 1948, Reimann became chairman of the West German Communist Party.

Reimann was a member of the Landtag of North Rhine-Westphalia in 1946–1954, the advisory board of the British occupation zone in 1946–48 and the economical board of the Bizone in 1947–1949.

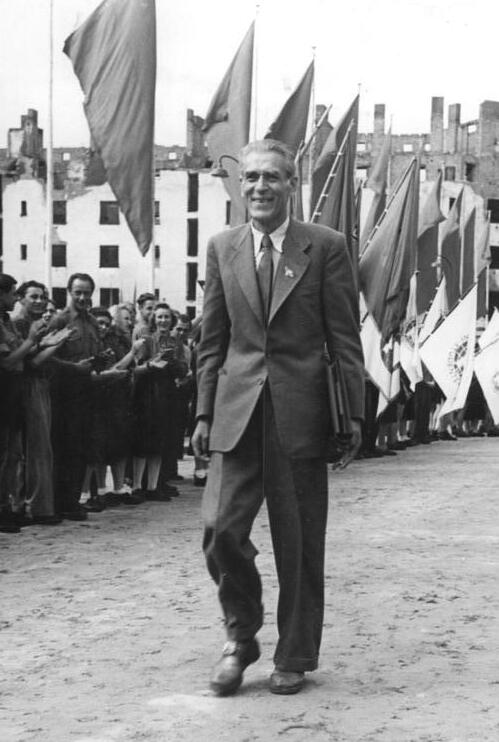
Reimann at the 3rd Party Congress of the SED, 1950

He was the head of the KPD group at the parliamentary council and a member of the Bundestag in 1949–1953. Reimann attended the funeral of Joseph Stalin in 1953.

In 1954, he moved to East Germany but continued to operate his position as the head of the West German KPD, which was banned in 1956.

Reimann returned to West Germany in 1968, became a member of the newly founded German Communist Party in 1971 and its honorary chairman.

Reimann died in Düsseldorf.

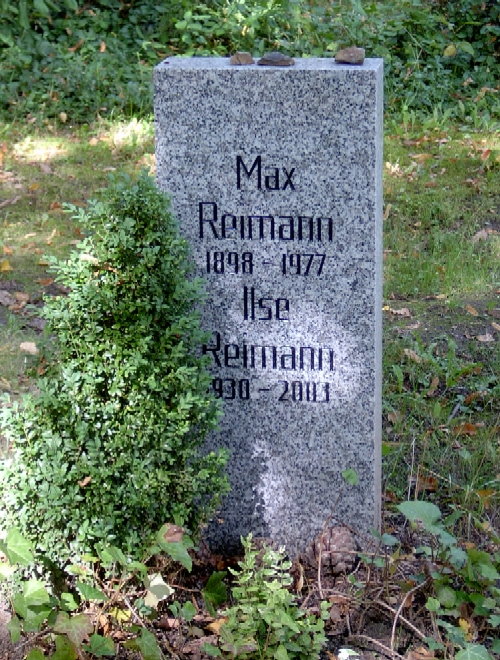
Max Reimann's tombstone at the Zentralfriedhof Friedrichsfelde in Berlin
