= Brussels Party Conference of the Communist Party of Germany =

1935 Meeting of the Communist Party of Germany

Postal stamp of the German Democratic Republic issued in 1975, portraying a party cadre posting the Brussels Party Conference manifesto at a wall

The Brussels Party Conference (German: Brüsseler Parteikonferenz) was a meeting of the Communist Party of Germany (KPD) held in Kuntsevo in the Soviet Union (on the outskirts of Moscow) on October 3 to 15, 1935. The conference was notable as marking the shift away from the ultra-left "Third Period" line of the KPD (which had singled out the Social Democrats as the main enemy) and affirming the Popular Front line for broad anti-fascist unity. At the conference the ascension of Walter Ulbricht and Wilhelm Pieck as the new main leaders of the KPD was affirmed. The Brussels Party Conference was later recognized as the 13th party congress.

== Crisis in KPD after 1933 ==
With the rise of fascism in Europe, the communist movement began working on building broader anti-fascist alliances. But the leftist majority in the KPD Politburo resisted such an approach. In the aftermath of the Reichstag fire and the banning of the party, the KPD leadership maintained that the 'Third Period' line was correct and that the Hitler regime would soon be toppled by a communist uprising. For example by May 1933 KPD argued that the Social Democratic Party of Germany (SPD) was the "social mainstay of the capitalist dictatorship". By mid-1934 the KPD Politburo majority (Schubert, Fritz Schulte, Franz Dahlem and Wilhelm Florin) instructed the Hesse-Frankfurt KPD organization to break up a local united front initiative with SPD.

With the arrest of KPD leader Ernst Thälmann on March 3, 1933, a struggle over the party leadership emerged with Hermann Schubert, John Schehr and Ulbricht as the main competitors. Ulbricht and Pieck began to articulate an opposition towards the leftist KPD Politburo majority, arguing that KPD should drop the total condemnation of social democracy. In the second half of 1934 the Communist International began pressuring the KPD leadership to change course. Dahlem and Paul Merker eventually joined the position of Ulbricht and Pieck. In the latter half of 1934, resulting from demands of Ulbricht and Pieck (who had the backing of the Communist International), KPD began identifying the National Socialists as the main enemy and opened up for a united front with SPD albeit this did not represent a complete rejection of the Third Period line. In January 1935 the Executive Committee of the Communist International (ECCI) condemned the KPD line as 'sectarian' and called on KPD to form a united front with social democrats including Sopade (the exiled SPD leadership) and to re-establish free trade unions in Germany. A KPD Politburo meeting was held in January 1935 at the request of ECCI, at which the position of Ulbricht and Pieck was further strengthened.

== Delegates in Kuntsevo ==
A few weeks after the 7th World Congress of the Communist International, the KPD leadership issued invitations to the Brussels Party Conference. The Brussels Party Conference would take place in Kuntsevo, near Moscow, between October 3 and 15, 1935. The name 'Brussels Party Conference' was deliberately used in order to avoid revealing the movements and locations of the KPD leadership. It was the fourth KPD party conference, and the first all-German conference of the party since Hitler coming to power in Germany.

Some 35 delegates attended the event, representing underground party organizations in Germany and the organization in exile. Among the Brussels Party Conference delegates were all the KPD delegation from the 7th World Congress of the Comintern. Two-thirds of the Brussels Party Conference delegates were party organizers in close contact with the clandestine party structures inside Germany.

== Togliatti's speech ==
Palmiro Togliatti attended the Brussels Party Conference as the ECCI representative. In his address he affirmed that in January 1935 an ECCI sub-commission and secretariat had discussed the German situation, and taken the position that the KPD Politburo majority had an incorrect political line. According to Togliatti the KPD had failed to work for a united front with the SPD and the General German Trade Union Federation (ADGB), and beyond the social democrats an alliance with the followers of Heinrich Brüning. Moreover Togliatti argued that the KPD should work for the voluntary and peaceful unification of the German people, annulment of the Treaty of Versailles and abolishing the Polish Corridor.

== Pieck's speech ==
Pieck based his address to the Brussels Party Conference on the main speech of Georgi Dimitrov at the 7th congress of the Communist International. He acknowledged that the KPD was a party in shambles, stating that the party had "a great loss of cadres due to the establishment of the fascist dictatorship. The fascists succeeded in arresting many of our functionaries. Many of them are still in concentration camps, many of them were forced to emigrate, and many were killed." Pieck stated that while the KPD had committed serious strategic and tactical errors, the main mistake had been that two years before Hitler coming to power the party had decided to concentrate their attacks on the SPD and not the fascist movement. Pieck's speech echoed the discourse that external critics of KPD had voiced since 1932–1933.

Pieck stated that the line going forward would be that of a united front and popular front, i.e. to work together with social democrats and "bourgeois" forces. In regards to the trade union movement, Pieck argued that the communists and "class-conscious workers" should utilize the legal opportunities for labour organizing within the German Labour Front (DAF) and try to organize free trade unions within DAF and at industrial sites.

In his speech, Florin argued that the fundamental tactical mistake of KPD had been to present the united front as unity within the party itself. In particular Florin condemned Heinz Neumann and Hermann Remmele (neither of whom had been invited to the Brussels Party Conference) for this deviation.

== Conference resolution and new party line ==
The Brussels Party Conference affirmed the popular front line of Ulbricht and Pieck, heeding the instructions of the 7th congress of the Communist International in rejecting the previous ultra-left line. Fritz David had drafted key parts of resolution.

The Brussels Party Conference resolution outlined that for the immediate future that "[t]he decisions of the VII World Congress of the Communist International and the IV Party Conference [i.e. the Brussels Party Conference] set the party's central task of creating a united front in the working class and an anti-fascist popular front of all working people. The overthrow of the Hitler dictatorship in Germany will be brought about by organizing and leading the struggle in the factories, in the mass organizations, in the residential areas, in the villages, by creating unity of action among all working people." In order to achieve the united front it was demanded that the "Communist Party, its organizations and members must approach the fulfillment of their tasks with a new attitude towards social democracy."

In regards to trade unions the resolution argued that "[u]nder no circumstances should the previous division of the trade union movement along party lines be allowed to occur again. The Communist Party is for the unity and full independence of the trade union movement and will support and promote its reconstruction with all its strength." The Brussels Party Conference instructed the KPD to employ Trojan horse tactics, planning to infiltrate National Socialist organizations (in particular the German Labour Front). The politically unorganized masses would be included in the struggle through the creation of non-party class bodies (wage and price commissions, accident prevention commissions, solidarity committees, etc.).

There were some clear shifts in the language used by the party. Concepts like the struggle for Soviet Germany and the dictatorship of the proletariat were downplayed. The anti-fascist people's front would, per the Brussels Party Conference resolution, also gather "the oppositional bourgeois groups (from the ranks of the German nationalists, the Reichswehr, etc.)". The conference resolution called for a struggle for democratic rights and freedoms, making references to the spirit of the 1848 revolutions in order to appeal to "bourgeois" sectors. The party would appeal to the peasantry on the grounds that the National Socialists had failed in their commitments to land reform and affirming the KPD line of radical agricultural reform.

The Brussels Party Conference argued that the victory of socialism in the Soviet Union was a decisive factor in strengthening all anti-fascist forces around the world and at the same time condemned the war preparations of German fascism. The conference resolution read that "Germany needs peace and cooperation with other nations, and above all needs an understanding with the Soviet Union."

== Central Committee election ==
The KPD Central Committee elected at the Brussels Party Conference consisted of Anton Ackermann, Paul Bertz, Franz Dahlem, Wilhelm Florin, Kurt Funk, Irene Gärtner, Walter Hähnel, Fritz Heckert, Wilhelm Knöchel, Paul Merker, Karl Mewis, Willi Münzenberg, Wilhelm Pieck and Walter Ulbricht. Pieck was named to serve as party chairman provisionally during Thälmann's imprisonment. With a new Central Committee elected, the struggle over control of the party leadership had been settled. With his opponents left out of the Central Committee and the Politburo, Ulbricht's and Pieck's dominance over KPD was cemented.

== Changes in the party organization ==
Reviewing organizational questions, a debate largely resulting from petitions of party cadres in the German underground, the Brussels Party Conference self-critically recognized that the highly centralized party apparatus had facilitated for the Gestapo to break up the party organization. A new decentralized organizational set-up was adopted by the conference, setting out to create Sectional Leaderships in Prague, Brussels, Amsterdam, Copenhagen and Forbach which would liaise with small groups of cadres inside Germany.

== Legacy ==
Pieck's speech at the Brussels Party Conference was published in the German-language booklet titled The new path towards a united struggle to overthrow the Hitler dictatorship, of which 5,000 copies were printed in Moscow. Whilst clandestine groups of communist and social democrats would often cooperate inside Germany, the exiled social democratic leadership rejected all requests from the KPD Central Committees to cooperate at the level of central party executives. The Sopade leader discarded the statements of the Brussels Party Conference as tactical maneuvers from KPD.

In March 1946, the KPD Secretariat decided to recognize the Brussels Party Conference as the 13th party congress ('XIII. Parteitag'). In the German Democratic Republic historiography, the Brussels Party Conference would be assigned a significant historical importance for having opened the path for broad anti-fascist unity as a precursor to the process of unification of the communists and social democrats into the Socialist Unity Party of Germany (SED).

Only parts of the Brussels Party Conference proceedings have become public. In 1975, the documentation Die Brüsseler Konferenz der KPD: 3.–15. Oktober 1935 was published by Klaus Mammach in Berlin.
