= List of members of the Central Committee of the Communist Party of Germany =

This list provides an alphabetically ordered overview of the members of the Central Committee of the Communist Party of Germany (KPD) who were elected at the Party Congresses (1925–1939) or named in the KPD appeal after the re-admission in June 1945. It was not until the 10th Party Congress of the KPD in July 1925 in Berlin that a Central Committee (ZK) was elected as the governing body. It replaced the Zentrale (→ List of members of the Zentrale of the Communist Party of Germany).

The reason is given in brackets if members left the Central Committee before the next Party Congress (e.g. expulsion from the party, natural death, murder) or if the members were elected in absentia.

== 10th Party Congress (1925) ==
The delegates of the tenth Party Congress in Berlin (12 – 17 July 1925) elected the following members to the Central Committee:

- Conrad Blenkle
- Philipp Dengel (elected to the Secretariat)
- Hugo Eberlein
- Ruth Fischer (expelled from the KPD in August 1926)
- Wilhelm Florin
- Ottomar Geschke (elected to the Secretariat)
- Fritz Heckert
- Artur König
- Arkadi Maslow (expelled from the KPD in August 1926)
- Wilhelm Pieck
- Hermann Remmele
- Paul Schlecht
- Ernst Schneller
- Werner Scholem (expelled from the Central Committee in October 1925, from the KPD in November 1926)
- Wilhelm Schwan
- Max Schütz
- Hugo Urbahns (expelled from the KPD in November 1926)
- Ernst Thälmann (elected to the Secretariat)
- Hans Weber

== 11th Party Congress (1927) ==
At the eleventh Party Congress of the KPD in Essen (2 – 7 March 1927), the following members were elected to the Central Committee, in addition to eighteen candidates:

- Karl Albin Becker
- Adolf Betz
- Conrad Blenkle
- Johann Biefang
- Franz Dahlem
- Philipp Dengel (elected to the Political Secretariat)
- Paul Dietrich (elected to the Secretariat)
- Hugo Eberlein (elected to the Secretariat)
- Arthur Ewert (elected to the Political Secretariat)
- Leo Flieg (elected to the Secretariat)
- Wilhelm Florin
- Max Gerbig
- Ottomar Geschke
- Arthur Golke
- Walter Hähnel
- Fritz Heckert
- Wilhelm Hein
- Paul Merker
- Ernst Meyer (elected to the Political Secretariat, resigned late 1927)
- Willi Münzenberg
- Michael Niederkirchner
- Helene Overlach
- Wilhelm Pieck
- Hermann Remmele
- Joseph Schlaffer
- Ernst Schneller (elected to the Secretariat)
- Johannes Schröter
- Fritz Schulte
- Georg Schumann
- Walter Stoecker
- Ernst Thälmann (elected chairman, also elected to the Political Secretariat)
- Walter Ulbricht (elected to the Secretariat)
- Jean Winterich
- John Wittorf (expelled from the KPD in September 1928)
- Clara Zetkin

== 12th Party Congress (1929) ==
The twelfth Party Congress of the KPD in Berlin-Wedding (9 – 12 June 1929) elected the following Central Committee:

- Joseph Büser (expelled from the KPD in January 1931)
- Franz Dahlem (elected to the reorganized Secretariat on 19 October 1928)
- Philipp Dengel
- Leo Flieg (elected to the reorganized Secretariat on 19 October 1928)
- Wilhelm Florin
- Ottomar Geschke
- Ernst Grube
- Arthur Golke
- Walter Häbich (executed by the SS in Dachau on 30 June 1934)
- Margarete Hahne
- Fritz Hastenreiter
- Fritz Heckert (elected to the reorganized Secretariat on 19 October 1928)
- Wilhelm Hein (expelled from the KPD in 1933)
- Wilhelm Kasper
- Robert Klausmann
- Wilhelm Koenen
- Karl Küll
- Willy Leow
- Friedrich Lux (executed in the Fuhlsbüttel on 6 November 1933)
- Paul Merker (elected to the reorganized Secretariat)
- Willi Münzenberg
- Gustav Nitsche
- Heinz Neumann (elected to the reorganized Secretariat, relieved of his duties in April 1932)
- Michael Niederkirchner
- Helene Overlach
- Wilhelm Pieck
- Gustav Pötzsch
- Hermann Remmele (elected to the reorganized Secretariat on 19 October 1928)
- Rudolf Renner
- Helene Rosenhainer
- Josef Schlaffer
- Fritz Schulte
- Walter Stoecker
- Ernst Thälmann (elected to the reorganized Secretariat on 19 October 1928)
- Walter Ulbricht (elected to the reorganized Secretariat)
- Karl Winter
- Jean Winterich (died on 27 June 1931, in Berlin)
- Josef Winternitz

== "Brussels" Conference / 13th Party Congress (1935) ==
The "Brussels" Conference, later called the 13th Party Congress of the KPD, met following the 7th World Congress of the Comintern in Moscow from 3 to 15 October 1935. Wilhelm Pieck became party chairman of the KPD in place of the imprisoned Ernst Thälmann. The following members and candidates were elected to the Central Committee:

- Anton Ackermann
- Paul Bertz
- Franz Dahlem
- Leo Flieg (sentenced to death by the Military Collegium of the Supreme Court of the Soviet Union and shot on 14 March 1939)
- Wilhelm Florin
- Walter Hähnel
- Fritz Heckert (died on 7 April 1936, in Moscow)
- Paul Merker
- Willi Münzenberg (expelled from the Central Committee in March 1938)
- Wilhelm Pieck
- Elli Schmidt
- Ernst Thälmann (in absentia)
- Walter Ulbricht
- Herbert Wehner
- Heinrich Wiatrek

Candidates:

- Wilhelm Knöchel
- Werner Kowalski (“Erich Dobler”; expelled from the KPD in May 1938)
- Karl Mewis

== "Bern" Conference / 14th Party Congress (1939) ==
The so-called "Bern" Conference – later called the fourteenth Party Congress – met from 30 January to 2 February 1939, in Draveil near Paris. At the conference, the following Central Committee was elected, to which some who were not present were also elected:

- Anton Ackermann
- Paul Bertz
- Franz Dahlem
- Philipp Dengel (in absentia)
- Wilhelm Florin (in absentia)
- Walter Hähnel (alias "Karl Kunart")
- Wilhelm Knöchel
- Johann Koplenig (Chairman of the KPÖ)
- Paul Merker
- Karl Mewis
- Wilhelm Pieck
- Siegfried Rädel
- Elli Schmidt
- Emil Svoboda (unknown, probably a pseudonym)
- Walter Ulbricht (in absentia)
- Herbert Wehner (in absentia; expelled from the KPD on 6 June 1942)
- Heinrich Wiatrek

== Appeal (1945) ==
The members of the Central Committee named in the Appeal of the Communist Party of Germany of 11 June 1945 are:

- Anton Ackermann
- Martha Arendsee
- Johannes R. Becher
- Franz Dahlem
- Irene Gärtner (pseudonym for Elli Schmidt)
- Ottomar Geschke
- Edwin Hoernle
- Hans Jendretzky
- Bernard Koenen
- Hans Mahle
- Hermann Matern
- Michael Niederkirchner
- Wilhelm Pieck
- Gustav Sobottka
- Walter Ulbricht
- Otto Winzer

In the Soviet Occupation Zone, the KPD and the SPD merged to form the SED at the unification party conference on 21/22 April 1946 (→ List of members of the SED Party Executive).

At the KPD delegate conference in Herne at the end of April 1948, a separate party executive was elected for the western zones for the first time (→ List of members of the KPD Party Executive). After the KPD was banned in the Federal Republic of Germany, a Central Committee was again constituted on 30 September 1956 to lead the illegal party work, which existed until the German Communist Party (DKP) was admitted.

== Sources ==
- Hermann Weber (Hrsg.): Der deutsche Kommunismus. Dokumente 1915–1945. 3. Auflage. Kiepenheuer & Witsch, Köln 1973, S. 433–435.
- Günter Judick, Josef Schleifstein, Kurt Steinhaus (Hrsg.): KPD 1945–1968. Dokumente. Band 1. Edition Marxistische Blätter, Neuss 1989, S. 143.
