= Willi Agatz =

German politician (1904–1957)

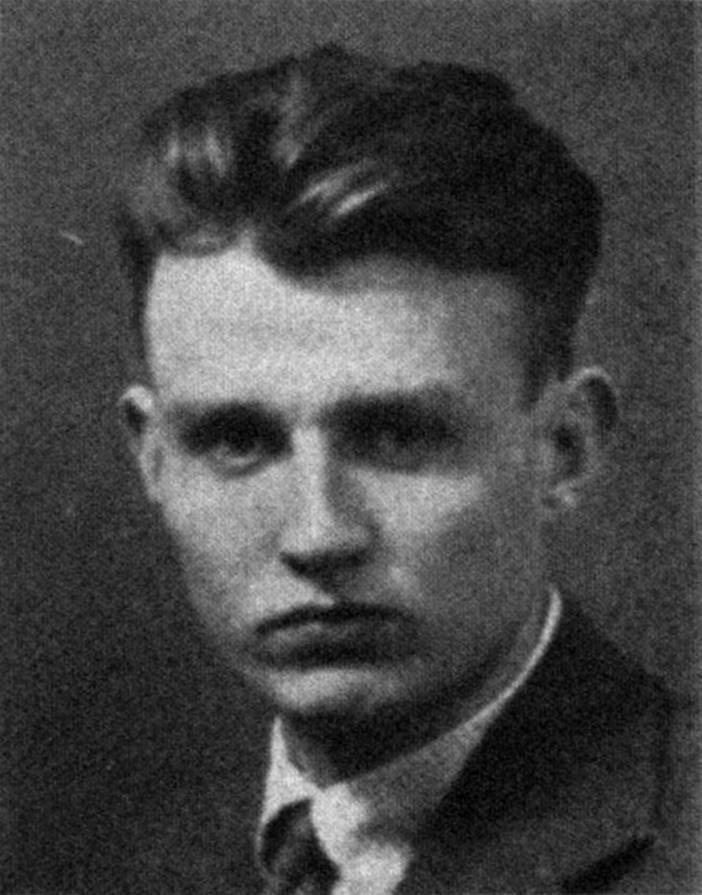
- Official Reichstag portrait, c. 1930

Member of the Bundestag for North Rhine-Westphalia
- In office 7 September 1949 – 7 September 1953
- Preceded by: Constituency established
- Succeeded by: Multi-member district

Member of the Landtag of North Rhine-Westphalia
- In office 26 September 1946 – 6 September 1949
- Preceded by: Constituency established
- Succeeded by: Multi-member district

National Leader of the Revolutionäre Gewerkschafts Opposition
- In office September 1933 – January 1934
- Preceded by: Fritz Schulte
- Succeeded by: Position abolished

Member of the Reichstag for Westphalia South
- In office 13 October 1930 – 28 February 1933
- Preceded by: Multi-member district
- Succeeded by: Constituency abolished

Personal details
- Born: 10 June 1904 Essen, Province of Westphalia, Kingdom of Prussia, German Empire
- Died: 29 August 1957 (aged 53) East Berlin. East Germany
- Party: SPD (1920–1922); KPD (1922–1953); SED (1953–1957)
- Spouse: Käte Bergmann (m. 1927)
- Occupation: Politician; Trade Unionist

Military service
- Allegiance: Nazi Germany
- Branch/service: Wehrmacht
- Years of service: 1943–1945
- Unit: 999th Penal Battalion
- Battles/wars: World War II; Eastern Front

Wilhelm "Willi" Agatz (10 June 1904 – 29 August 1957) was a German communist trade unionist, politician and resistance fighter of the Communist Party (KPD) who served in the Reichstag before World War II and the Bundestag after.

== Early life ==
Wilhelm Agatz was born in the Heisingen district of Essen, the son of Social Democratic miner Ludgar Agatz and factory worker Maria, née Blondrath. He attended elementary school in Essen and did an apprenticeship as a miner at the Carl Funke Mine and later at the Ludwig Mine in Bergerhausen. In 1920 he joined and founded a local group of the Socialist Workers' Youth. After completing his apprenticeship, he joined the Union of Miners of Germany (VdBD) and was elected to the works council at the Ludwig mine.

== Political career ==
Agatz joined the Young Communist League in 1922 and the Communist Party proper in 1924. In 1927, he married Käte Bergmann and moved to Recklinghausen. In 1930, he was expelled from the VdBD for his communist politics, and soon after became involved in the Revolutionäre Gewerkschafts Opposition (RGO), organizing in the Ruhr region. The same year, he was elected to the Reichstag representing the Westphalia South district. At 26 years old, he was the third-youngest member of the body, behind Nazi Rudolf Schmeer and fellow Communist Artur Becker.

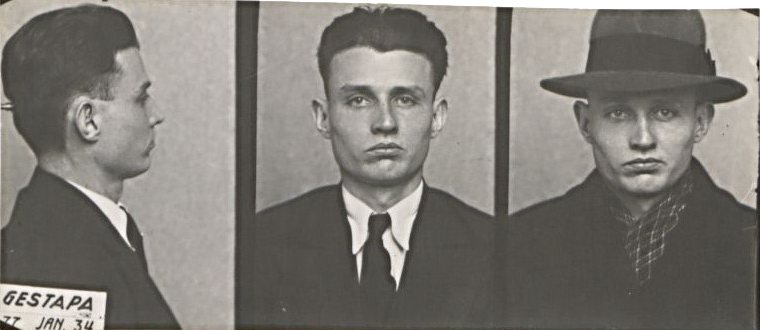
Agatz's Gestapo mugshot, 1934

Agatz joined the RGO's national leadership in 1931, and served as Chairman of the Unified Association of German Miners (EvBD) from May 1932 to April 1933, succeeding Albert Funk. After the Nazis came to power, Agatz lost his seat in the Reichstag but continued to work underground. In September 1933, he moved to the Schöneberg district of Berlin and became National Leader of the RGO after Fritz Schulte was forced to flee the country, organizing the union's illegal work until his own arrest on 18 January 1934. He was detained for over a year at Columbia-Haus, Alexanderplatz, and Moabit before the People's Court sentenced him to three more years at the Luckau prison. Rather than being released at the end of his sentence, he was sent to Sachsenhausen, where he was interned until October 1939. Even after his release, he remained under police supervision.

== World War II ==
Agatz worked as a bricklayer at Hochtief AG until being drafted into the Wehrmacht in January 1943. He was assigned to the 999th Penal Battalion, serving in Greece, Czechia-Slovakia, Poland, and the Baltic States. He was scheduled to be executed on 8 May 1945, but because the Nazis had surrendered the previous day, the officer in charge did not carry out the order.

Agatz was taken prisoner by the Soviets and sent to the Klaipeda POW Camp, where he became head of the Antifascist Committee. He was released on 7 May 1946, exactly one year after the German surrender.

== Postwar career ==
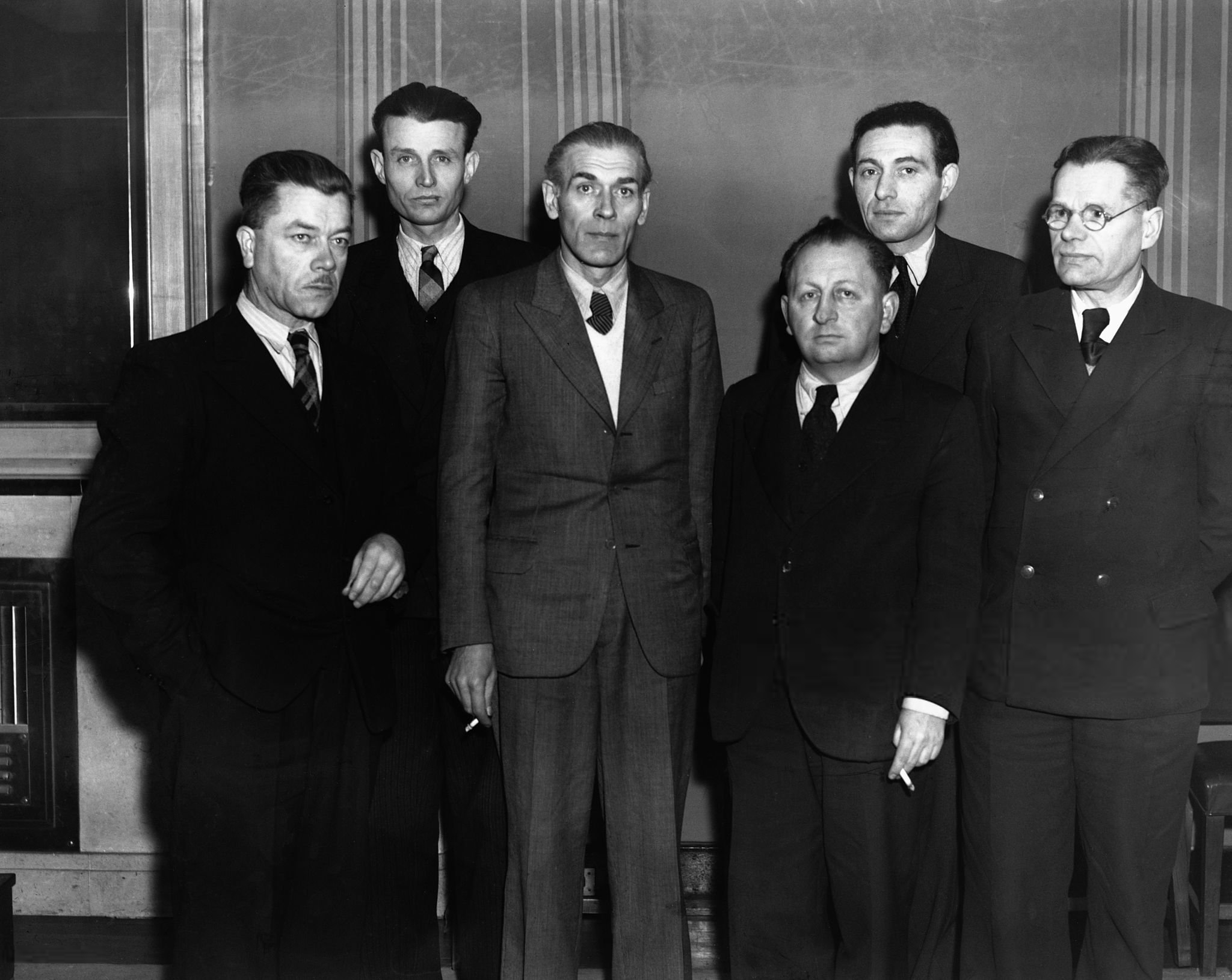
Agatz (second from left) with other members of the West German KPD at a meeting in London, 28 February 1947

After his release from captivity, Agatz returned to Essen and helped establish the Industrial Union of Mining (IG Bergbau). At the end of the year, he became second chairman of the union in the British occupation zone after losing the election for first chairman to Social Democrat August Schmidt by a margin of 232 to 349. He lost re-election in 1948 and was expelled from the union altogether in 1950, both as a result of anticommunist sentiment.

In 1946, Agatz was appointed a member of the Landtag of North Rhine-Westphalia, where he was active in the labor and economic committees and advocated for the socialization of mining. He served in that office until his election to the Bundestag in 1949, where he remained until 1953. He was also a member of the KPD Party Executive in West Germany until it was banned in 1956.

Soon after leaving office, Agatz was charged with treason relating to the publication and distribution of propaganda. Although the proceedings were temporarily suspended, Agatz decided to move to East Germany and continue his propaganda work from there. At the same time, his health began to rapidly deteriorate, and he eventually died in East Berlin on 28 August 1957. He was 53 years old.

The chief physician's report stated:

"From the medical history it was clear that Mr. Agatz had been exposed to severe physical and mental stress as a result of Nazi violence. In addition, he went through a period of chronic malnutrition, tertian and tropical malaria in 1943 and dysentery at the same time. [...] After the malaria treatment, he developed heart problems with shortness of breath, which meant that physical exertion was very poorly tolerated."

== Legacy ==
In East Germany, the Freital Coalworks (VEB Steinkohlenwerk Freital) was renamed VEB Steinkohlenwerk "Willi Agatz" in 1958. It operated a mine in the Döhlen Basin in Dresden-Gittersee and was taken over in 1968 as the "Willi Agatz" Mining Company by the SDAG Wismut (Soviet-German Joint Stock Company) in order to mine the uranium-rich hard coal there. Additionally, the sanatorium for dust lung patients in Bad Suderode was named after him until 1990.

== Literature ==
Herbst, Ludolf; Jahn, Bruno (2002). Vierhaus, Rudolf (ed.). Biographisches Handbuch der Mitglieder des Deutschen Bundestages. 1949–2002 [Biographical Handbook of the Members of the German Bundestag. 1949–2002] (in German). München: De Gruyter - De Gruyter Saur. p. 1715. ISBN 978-3-11-184511-1.
