= Hermann Schubert (politician) =

German activist and politician

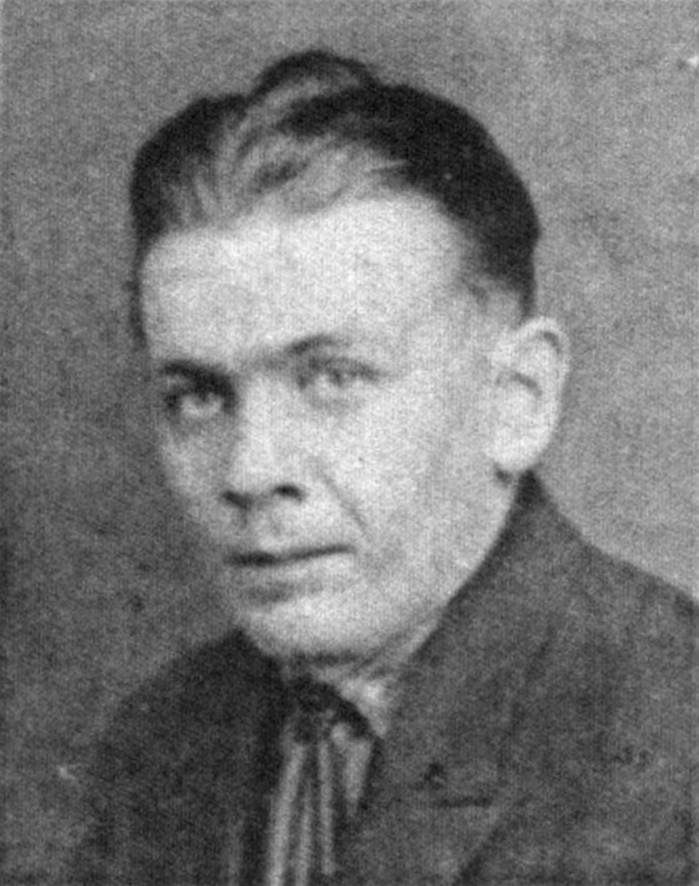
- Schubert c. 1924

Member of the Landtag of Prussia for Schleswig-Holstein
- In office 5 January 1925 – 31 March 1933
- Preceded by: Multi-member district
- Succeeded by: Constituency abolished

Member of the Reichstag for Thuringia
- In office 27 May 1924 – 21 July 1924
- Preceded by: Multi-member district
- Succeeded by: Karl Korsch

Personal details
- Born: 26 January 1886 Lengefeld, Kingdom of Saxony, German Empire
- Died: 22 March 1938 (aged 52) Moscow, Soviet Union
- Party: SPD (1907–1917); USPD (1917–1920); KPD (after 1920)
- Education: International Lenin School
- Occupation: Politician
- Central institution membership: 1932–1935: Full member, KPD Politburo; 1931–1935: Full member, KPD Central Committee; 1929–1931: Candidate member, KPD Central Committee; Other offices held: 1931–1932: Political Leader, Wasserkante (Hamburg-Schleswig-Holstein) KPD; 1929–1931: Political Leader, East Prussia KPD

Hermann Schubert (26 January 1886 – 22 March 1938) was a German political activist and politician. In 1924 he briefly sat as a member of the national parliament (Reichstag), representing the Communist Party of Germany.

In 1933, some months after the Nazi power seizure, he fled from Nazi Germany, ending up as a political refugee in Moscow. He was later arrested by the Soviets in 1937 and executed in 1938.

Sources may refer to him using the name "Max Richter", the cover-name under which he sometimes operated between 1933 and 1935.

== Life ==
=== Early years ===
Schubert was born in Lengefeld, a small mining town in the hills south of Chemnitz, not far from the German border with what was, at the time, the Austrian province of Bohemia. He attended school in the town. One source states that his early work was as a miner and another adds that he trained locally as a metal worker with "Wittig & Schwabe". He joined the German Metal Workers' Union when he was only sixteen. He also joined the Social Democratic Party (SPD), although sources differ as to whether he did this in 1907 or 1912. By 1912 he had moved to Leipzig where he was employed full-time as the secretary of the Workers' Gymnastics Association ("Arbeiter-Turnerbund").

At the outbreak of war in 1914, the decision of the party to implement an effective political truce over funding for the war was immediately contentious within the party, and internal divisions grew as economic destitution at home and industrial-scale slaughter on the frontline mounted. In 1917 the party split: Schubert was one of those who went with the breakaway faction, forming the short-lived Independent Social Democratic Party ("Unabhängige Sozialdemokratische Partei Deutschlands" / USPD). Three years later the USPD itself broke up, and Hermann Schubert was a member of the majority group that now joined the recently launched Communist Party.

=== Communist politician ===
Early in the 1920s Hermann Schubert was in one of the first batches of German communists to attend a course at what became the International Lenin School in Moscow. He became a trades union secretary in Suhl in 1922, and in 1923 was among the delegates at the 8th Communist party conference, held that year in Leipzig. He also played a leading part in the armed insurrection that broke out in Thuringia later in 1923, as a result of which he was arrested early in 1924. However, on 27 April 1924 party comrades stormed the jail in Suhl and succeeded in releasing him.

In the general election of May 1924 Schubert's name appeared on the Communist Party candidate list for Election district 12 (Thuringia). The party secured sufficient votes in Thuringia to give it four seats in the national Reichstag, and Schubert's name was high enough up on the party list for one of them to be his. Reichstag membership would normally have secured him some level of parliamentary immunity. However, in the wake of street disturbances across several parts of Germany during 1923, in November of that year a court had declared the Communist Party illegal: the ban was still in force through the summer of 1924 and election to the Reichstag in May 1924 provided no effective immunity against re-arrest. In July 1924, after just two months, Schubert resigned his Reichstag seat and relocated to the Ruhr area in the west of the country, which at this point was still under French military occupation in connection with an ongoing dispute about war reparations. Schubert pursued his (now illegal) party work in the Ruhr region, where he was appointed regional party secretary at Bochum. However, on 21 October 1924, despite holding a false passport, Schubert was re-arrested.

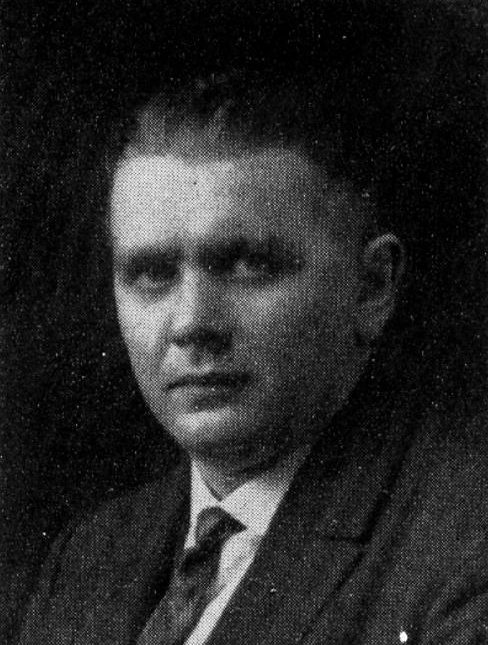
Schubert's official Landtag portrait, 1928

In December 1924 he was elected a member of the Prussian regional parliament ("Landtag"), and was released from jail in January 1925. He continued at this stage to be based for much of the time in the Ruhr area, serving as a member of the Communist Party district leadership team ("Bezirksleitung") in Essen with particular responsibility for trades union matters till 1928, which was also the year in which he was re-elected to the Prussian Landtag, in which he served till 1933.

During this time Schubert came into contact with Wilhelm Florin. At the end of 1928 serious differences arose between the two men, and Schubert was transferred, briefly, to party duties in Berlin where he worked till March 1929 in the "Comradeship Department" ("Genossenschaftsabteilung") of the Party Central Committee, before being sent to East Prussia as a regional Polleiter ("Leiter der Abteilung Politik" / Policy Head). Between May 1930 and early 1933 he was undertaking secretarial duties as part of the regional leadership team (Bezirksleitung) in the Wasserkante district, the large region surrounding Hamburg on the right bank of the Elbe estuary. In 1931 he was appointed Polleiter (Political Leader) for Wasserkante, serving until 1932. He was succeeded in that position by future resistance leader Anton Saefkow.

At the 1929 party conference, held that year in Berlin-Wedding, Schubert's name was placed on the candidate list for membership of the Communist Party Central Committee, which was the party's ruling body nationally. After just two years, in 1931, he was co-opted into the Central Committee, and in 1932 the party leader Ernst Thälmann, appointed him to membership of the Politburo, which was the executive committee within the Central Committee.

=== Nazi Germany: Soviet exile ===
In January 1933 the political backdrop was transformed when the Nazi Party took power and converted Germany into a one-party dictatorship. Political activity - except in support of the Nazi Party - became illegal. At the end of February 1933 the Reichstag fire was instantly blamed on the Communists, and in March 1933 the party leader, Schubert's friend Ernst Thälmann, was arrested: Schubert immediately went to Berlin, as recently agreed with Thälmann, in order to take over the chairmanship of the illegal Communist Party. This unleashed a political struggle with Schubert and John Schehr on one side and Walter Ulbricht on the other. Ulbricht was already a shrewd and ruthless political operator who coveted the party leadership for himself. Schehr was discovered and arrested in November 1933, but Schubert remained active in the party leadership. Schubert and Schehr, backed by a politburo majority that included Wilhelm Florin, Fritz Schulte and Franz Dahlem, were keen to continue with Thälmann's uncompromisingly left-wing Communist agenda, while Ulbricht, backed by another future heavy hitter, Wilhelm Pieck, appeared to advocate a more pragmatic future for the party. The division reflected a series of bitter disputes and splits that had affected the German and Soviet Communist Parties during the 1920s, and would provide a defining context for Schubert's political career in the run-up to his execution in 1938.

In Autumn 1933 Hermann Schubert fled from Nazi Germany, crossing the frontier from his home region into Czechoslovakia where leading exiled German communists were attempting to regroup in Prague. He moved on to the Saarland, a part of Germany still at this point under French military occupation, and from there to Paris, where a more permanent headquarters for the German Communist Party in exile was forming. However, in December 1934 he was one of the communist leaders who relocated again, this time to Moscow, still representing the party's left-wing within the Party Central Committee.

Between 1933 and 1935 (sometimes applying the cover-name "Max Richter") Schubert played a decisive role in the party leadership. A meeting took place in January 1935 between the German Communist Party leadership and the Comintern at which Schubert's appointment to the Comintern executive committee in succession to Fritz Heckert was agreed. However, just as the political tide in Moscow was clearly turning against the Comintern, so Schubert himself was becoming increasingly marginalised inside the party. It was the Ulbricht / Pieck faction that was becoming mainstream, and both Florin and Dahlem switched sides, joining Ulbricht's group. The first party conference since the Nazis seized power was held in Moscow in October 1935. It was here that Schubert and his friend Fritz Schulte were excluded from the party central committee, scapegoated for the party's misfortunes and distanced from the apparatus of the party and of the Comintern. He was given a relatively low-profile position in International Red Aid, the international Communist workers' welfare organisation. However, on 15 May 1937, in the context of the purges (" Чистки") that were a feature of political life in Moscow during the later 1930s, Hermann Schubert was arrested by the NKVD. He was identified as a participant in the "Anti-Comintern block", and on 22 March 1938 he was condemned to death and, later the same day, shot.

Two months later, in May 1938, the government back home in Germany posthumously stripped Hermann Schubert of his German citizenship.
