= Fritz Emrich =

German politician (1894–1947)

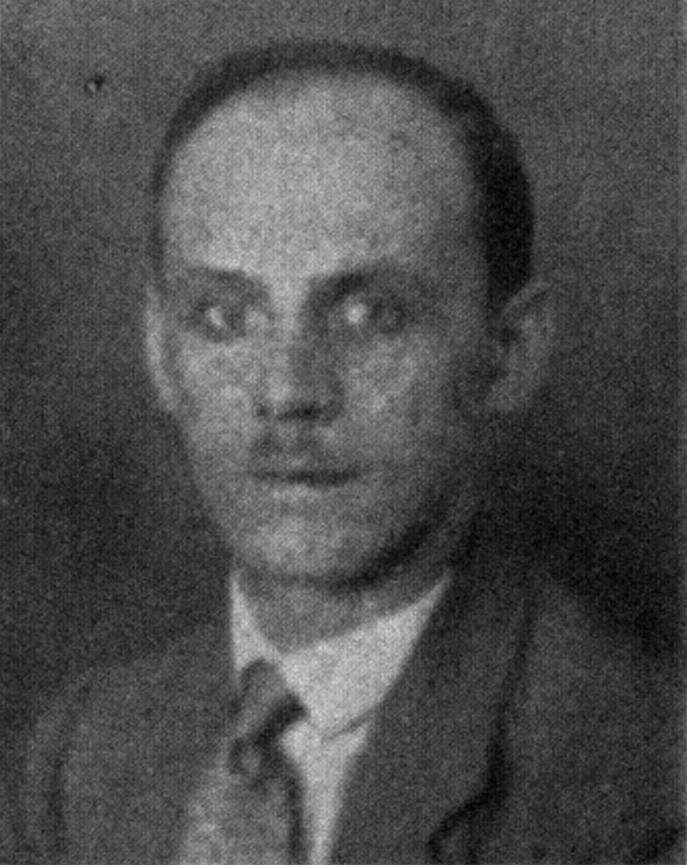
- Emrich c. 1932

National Leader of the Revolutionäre Gewerkschafts Opposition
- In office June 1930 – October 1930
- Preceded by: Paul Merker
- Succeeded by: Franz Dahlem

Member of the Reichstag for Merseburg
- In office 31 July 1932 – 28 February 1933
- Preceded by: Multi-member district
- Succeeded by: Constituency abolished

Personal details
- Born: 19 August 1894 Weißstein, Province of Silesia, Kingdom of Prussia, German Empire
- Died: 27 July 1947 (aged 52) Berlin, Soviet Occupation Zone, Germany
- Cause of death: Explosion
- Resting place: Friedrichshagen Evangelical Cemetery, Berlin, Germany
- Party: SPD (1910–1920); KPD (1920–1946); SED (1946–1947)
- Occupation: Trade unionist, politician

Fritz Emrich (19 August 1894 – 27 July 1947) was a German trade unionist, Communist Party official, and politician who served as the National Leader of the Revolutionäre Gewerkschafts Opposition from June to October 1930 and in the Reichstag from 1932 to 1933.

== Life ==
The son of a bricklayer, Emrich learned the tailoring trade after attending elementary school. In the following years he worked in the textile industry. He had been a member of the Social Democratic Party of Germany (SPD) since 1910. In 1920 he switched to the Communist Party of Germany (KPD). From 1928 he was a full-time official in the Central Committee of the KPD. At the Fourth World Congress of the Red International of Labor Unions in 1928, he was appointed to the presidium of the Profintern. From 1929 to 1930 he was a member of the Reich Committee of the Revolutionäre Gewerkschafts Opposition (RGO). In July 1930 he took over the role of National Leader of the RGO on an interim basis after Paul Merker was ousted from the post. Emrich served in that position until October 1930, when he was replaced by Franz Dahlem. Emrich continued to hold a leading position in the RGO Reich Committee. In July 1932 he was elected to the Reichstag representing Merseburg, where he remained until the Communists were banned from the chamber following the Reichstag Fire Decree.

Immediately after the Reichstag fire, Emrich was arrested by the Nazis because of his status as a communist and a Reichstag deputy. In March of the same year, Emrich was again elected to the Reichstag (this time for Westphalia South) but, like the other KPD Reichstag members, was unable to take his seat. He was imprisoned in the Esterwegen and Papenburg concentration camps until 1936. After his release, Emrich worked as a conscript in a dry cleaning factory and was active in the Berlin underground organization of the KPD. During World War II, Emrich was a member of the Saefkow-Jacob-Bästlein Organization and played a key role in building up its network. After Anton Saefkow's arrest in July 1944, Emrich managed to live illegally, completely on his own, in the capital of the declining German Reich until the victory of the Red Army in May 1945.

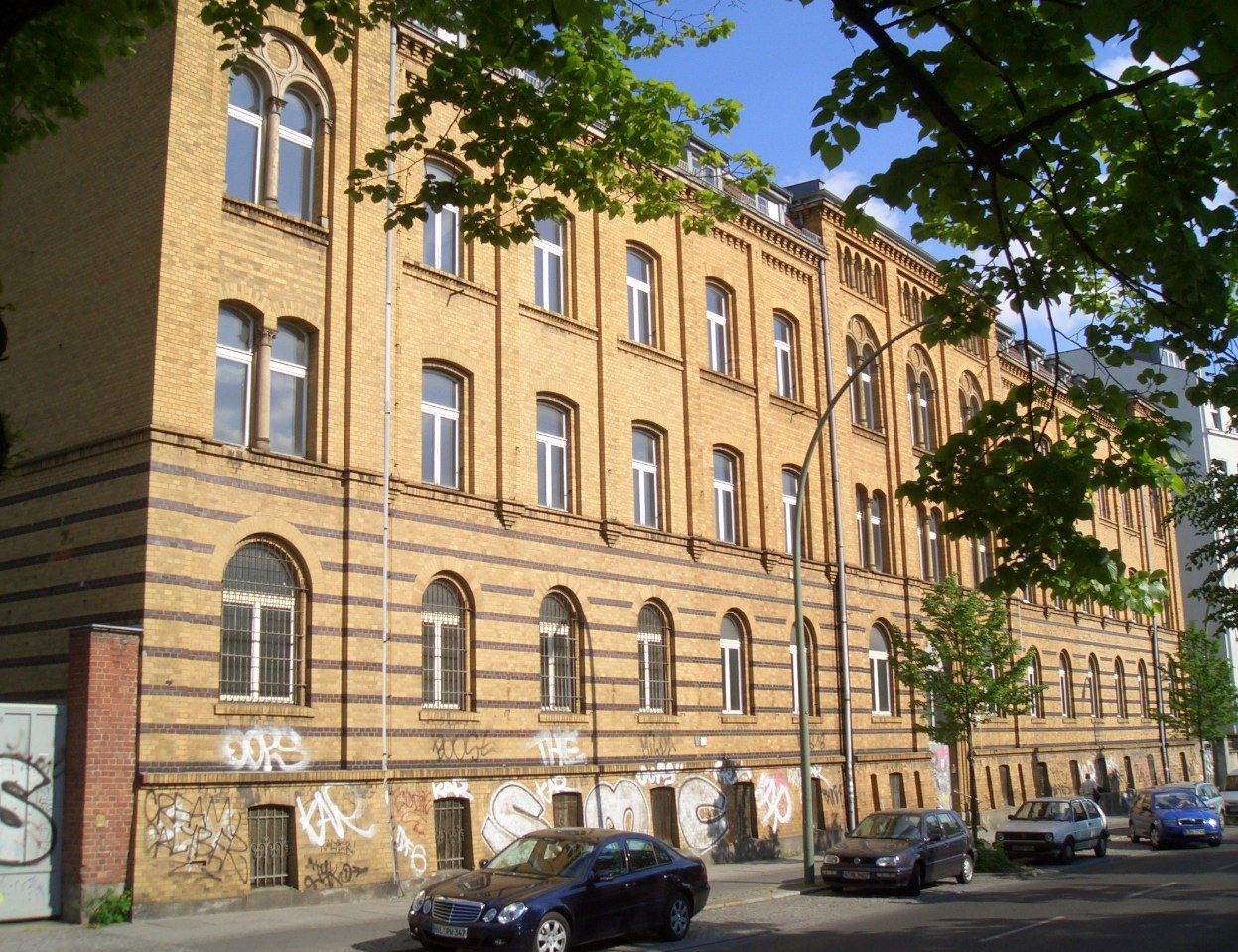
Schönhauser Allee 22 in 2007

After the war, in May 1945, Emrich briefly served as head of the Friedrichshagen police station and soon after in a leading position in the headquarters of the Volkspolizei in Berlin. He was liaison officer to the magistrate, clerk in the command of the police force and, from December 1946, head of the personnel department of the police force in Berlin. In 1946 he became a member of the SED. On July 27, 1947, Emrich, fellow police commissioner Emil Klenz, and seven other people were killed in an explosion at the police headquarters on Schönhauser Allee 22. The accident was due to the gross negligence of a pyrotechnician, who also lost his life.

Emrich was buried at the Friedrichshagen Evangelical Cemetery in Berlin.
