= Käthe Dahlem =

German political activist (1899–1974)

- Born: Käthe Weber; 20 March 1899; Berlin, Germany
- Died: 25 December 1974 (aged 75); East Berlin, East Germany
- Occupations: Political activist Resistance activist DFD leader
- Political party: USPD (1917–1920); VKPD (1920–1921); KPD (1920–1946); SED (1946–1974)
- Spouse: Franz Dahlem (m. 1919)
- Children: Luise (1919–1957); Robert (1922–1976)

Käthe Dahlem (born Käthe Weber: 20 March 1899 – 25 December 1974) was a German political activist (USPD, KPD) who, after being forced into exile, became an anti-fascist Resistance activist, participating in the Spanish Civil War and, subsequently, again based in France. After 1945 she became a public official in the Soviet occupation zone (relaunched in October 1949 as the German Democratic Republic (East Germany)). She was retired on health grounds in July 1949 and was subsequently caught up in her husband's difficulties with the ruling party, the party first secretary, Walter Ulbricht and other leading party comrades who had spent the war years in Moscow. By the 1960s, however, the authorities were happy to honour her pre-war and wartime contribution.

== Life ==
Käthe Weber was born in Berlin. Her father was a shoe maker and trades union official. Her mother worked in clothes making. She attended school in Cologne between 1905 and 1913 and then, between 1913 and 1919, worked as a sales assistant. She was only 14 when she joined the Young Socialists ("Sozialistische Arbeiter-Jugend"). In 1917 she joined the newly formed Independent Social Democratic Party ("Unabhängige Sozialdemokratische Partei Deutschlands" / USPD) which had broken away from the mainstream Social Democratic Party (SPD) after more than two years of increasingly fevered dissent within the SPD over the party leadership decision to implement what amounted to a parliamentary truce over funding for the war. When the USPD itself split apart, in 1920 she was part of the left wing majority that moved across to join the recently launched Communist Party of Germany.

On 20 March 1919 Käthe Weber married Franz Dahlem. Their daughter, Luise, was born in Cologne on 18 October 1919. Their son, Robert, was born in Cologne on 11 March 1922.

After the change of government in January 1933 the government lost no time in transforming Germany into a one-party dictatorship. Directly after the Reichstag fire at the end of February 1933 the conflagration was blamed on communists, and communists with a history of political activism either fled or were arrested. The Dahlems fled to Paris where they were both part of the leadership team of the exiled Communist Party, Käthe Dahlem working at this stage, primarily, as secretary to her husband. In 1935 she transferred to Prague working for the party central committee's operational leadership there: later that year she spent time working in Moscow. During 1936 she returned to Paris, where Franz Dahlem was still based. In 1937 she moved to Valencia where she worked for the Central Committee of the Communist Party of Germany in an office provided to them by the Communist Party of Spain. During the Spanish Civil War she was able to provide both administrative backup and political support to party comrades.

In 1938/39 she was back in Paris. Between 1940 and 1944 she based herself in Toulouse where she acted as treasurer for a local group of underground communists. She was also able to establish contact with the nearby Camp Vernet internment camp, originally constructed to accommodate fighters returning from the Spanish Civil War and now used to house large numbers of German political exiles previously settled in Paris - mostly communists - who following the outbreak of war in September 1939 had been identified as enemy aliens and arrested. After the German invasion in May/June 1940 the southern part of France came under the control of a puppet government and inmates at Camp Vernet enjoyed considerable freedom, but as the war dragged on security at the camp was progressively tightened, and in the end Jewish and other politically significant German inmates were handed over to the Gestapo and shipped to Germany. Franz Dahlem was transferred to Berlin in 1942. Käthe Dahlem remained in Toulouse, living illegally under the name "Cathérine Dallerey". After - possibly even before - the Liberation of Paris in August 1944 she was listed as organisation secretary for the western version of the Soviet sponsored National Committee for a Free Germany (in French "CALPO").

Franz Dahlem was freed by the Red army from his concentration camp in Germany and taken to Moscow in May 1945. He was returned to Germany on 1 July 1945. Käthe Dahlem returned from Paris in October 1945. Following the contentious party merger which created the Socialist Unity Party ("Sozialistische Einheitspartei Deutschlands" / SED) the Dahlems were among the thousands of Communists who lost no time in signing their party membership across to what had emerged, by October 1949, as the ruling party in a new kind of one-party dictatorship.

Between January 1946 and July 1947 Dahlem was head of the main women's committee with the Greater Berlin city council ("Magistrat von Berlin"), till 1949 also organisation leader for the Berlin women's committee. In March 1947 she was a founder member of the Democratic Women's League ("Demokratischer Frauenbund Deutschlands" / DFD) which under the Leninist constitutional structure being rolled out for East Germany quickly became one of officially sanctioned Mass movements controlled, in many respects by the ruling party and given an allocation of seats in the national legislature in order to broaden the political base and legitimacy of the government. She became secretary to the DFD in July 1947, retaining the post for two years. Between 1947 and 1953 she was a member of the Berlin regional executive ("Bezirksvorstand") of the DFD. However, she retired from her full-time offices on health grounds in July 1949.

A certain rivalry between Walter Ulbricht and Franz Dahlem had arisen in the 1930s, and after the war there were more general tensions within the national leadership between those - including Walter Ulbricht and President Pieck - who had spent the war years in Moscow and those (such as Dahlem) who had spent the war years in France. As general nervousness within the leadership increased in the context of the Noel Field revelations, in May 1953 Franz Dahlem found himself stripped of his party offices and subjected to a more general official "degradation" strategy. Käthe Dahlem resurfaced and robustly defended her husband before the National Party Control Commission ("Zentrale Parteikontrollkommission") on 12 June 1953, accusing the commission leader, Hermann Matern, of lying. It is impossible to measure the overall impact of her intervention, but Franz Dahlem was spared a show trial (unlike Paul Merker who was caught up in a similar set of circumstances around the same time) and indeed officially rehabilitated a few years later, though he never regained his position in the upper echelons of the ruling party.

Käthe Dahlem died in East Berlin on 25 December 1974.

== Awards and honours ==
- 1957 Clara Zetkin Medal
- 1958 Medal for Fighters Against Fascism 1933 - 1945.
- 1969 Patriotic Order of Merit in Gold.
- 1971 Franz and Käthe Dahlem were jointly awarded honorary citizenship of Ivry-sur-Seine in France.
- 1974 Karl-Marx-Orden.
- In Berlin an academy has been named after Käthe Dahlem.
