= List of members of the Politburo of the Communist Party of Germany =

This list provides an alphabetically ordered overview of the members and candidates of the Political Bureau (Polburo, later Politburo) of the Communist Party of Germany (KPD).

The formation of a political bureau (Polburo) was officially decided at the 7th Party Congress of the KPD (22–26 August 1921) in Jena. However, the KPD Zentrale had already set up a political bureau (Pol-Buro) and an organization bureau (Org-Buro) at the end of September 1920, as can be seen from the annual report to the 5th Party Congress.

On February 28, 1937, the Politburo of the Central Committee of the KPD in Moscow was dissolved and replaced by a four-member secretariat in Paris.

The representatives of the KJVD in the Politburo were not included here.

Name	1920	1921	1922	1923	1924	1925	1926	1927	1928	1929	1930	1931	1932	1933	1934	1935	1936	1937	Notes
Anton Ackermann																K	K	K	
Karl Albin Becker				M															Member February to Autumn
Paul Böttcher		M	M	M															
Heinrich Brandler	M*	M	M	M															Probably not consistently
Franz Dahlem									K	K/M	M	M	M	M	M	M	M		
Philipp Dengel						M	M	M	M	M									
Hugo Eberlein					M			M	M										
Gerhart Eisler								M	M					ko	ko	ko	ko	ko	According to the handbook article, he was co-opted back into the Politburo after 1933
Arthur Ewert						M	M	M	M	M									
Ruth Fischer					M	M													
Leo Flieg									K	K/M	M	M	M/K	K	K	K	K	K	Lexikon, p. 132 f.
Wilhelm Florin										M	M	M	M	M	M	M	M	M	
Ottomar Geschke						M	M	M											
Fritz Heckert						M	M	M	M	M	M	M	M	M	M	M	M		Anders Handbook: from 1927, but see Lexicon, p. 192
Wilhelm Hein										M	M	M	M	M					
Edwin Hoernle		M	M	M															Membership is missing in the handbook article and also in the lexicon
Wilhelm Kasper										M	M	M	M	M					
Iwan Katz					M	M													
August Kleine			M	M															According to the handbook list, but probably 1923/24
Wilhelm Koenen				M	M	M													According to the handbook already in 1921, membership is missing in the handbook article
Paul Levi	M*	M																	?
Arkadi Maslow					M	M													
Paul Merker									K	K/M						M	M	M	Multiple differing data in the sources
Ernst Meyer	M*	M	M	M				M	M	M									Multiple differing data in the sources
Heinz Neumann										M	M	M	M						In the handbook list already 1928, possibly the PolSekr is meant, but all other sources 1929
Helene Overlach										K	K	K	K						Why according to the handbook list only until 1932 unclear
Wilhelm Pieck	M	M						M	M	M	M	M	M						Quote from Handbook article: Member of the PB since November 18, 1926 until its dissolution in March 1937
Hermann Remmele					M	M	M	M	M	M	M	M	M	M					
Arthur Rosenberg					M	M													
John Schehr														M	M				
Paul Schlecht					M	M													
Ernst Schneller					M	M	M	M	M	M									According to the handbook article, he was back in the Politburo in 1932
Werner Scholem					M	M													
Hermann Schubert													M	M	M	M			
Max Schütz					M	M													
Fritz Schulte										M	M	M	M	M	M	M			
Wilhelm Schwan										M									
Walter Stoecker						M			M										Or 1921 to 1924?
Heinrich Süßkind								M	M										
Ernst Thälmann					M	M	M	M	M	M	M	M	M	M					
August Thalheimer	M*	M	M	M															Membership is missing in the handbook article
Walter Ulbricht											M	M	M	M	M	M	M	M	
Jacob Walcher		M	M	M															Membership is missing in the handbook article
Herbert Wehner																M	M	M	
Jean Winterich										M	M	M							
Clara Zetkin	M*	M	M	M															Probably not consistently according to the lexicon, p. 499: 1921 to 1924

Legend: ko – co-opted, K – Candidate, K/M – Candidate/Member, M – Member, M* – already a member of the KPD Zentrale, M/K – Member/Candidate

== Sources ==
- Andreas Herbst, Hermann Weber (Hrsg.): Deutsche Kommunisten. Biographisches Handbuch 1918–1945. Dietz, Berlin 2004; 2., überarbeitete und stark erweiterte Auflage 2008, ISBN 978-3-320-02130-6.
- Institut für Marxismus-Leninismus beim ZK der SED (Hrsg.): Geschichte der deutschen Arbeiterbewegung – Chronik. Teil II: von 1917 bis 1945. Dietz Verlag, Berlin 1966.
- Institut für Marxismus-Leninismus beim ZK der SED (Hrsg.): Geschichte der deutschen Arbeiterbewegung – Biographisches Lexikon. Dietz Verlag, Berlin 1970.
- Mitglieder und Kandidaten des Politbüros (Polbüro) der KPD in der Weimarer Republik. In: Hermann Weber: „Weiße Flecken“ in der Geschichte. Die KPD-Opfer der Stalinschen Säuberungen und ihre Rehabilitierung. 2. überarbeitete und erweiterte Auflage. isp-Verlag, Frankfurt am Main 1990, ISBN 3-88332-176-1, S. 136–137.
