= Albert Funk =

German politician (1894–1933)

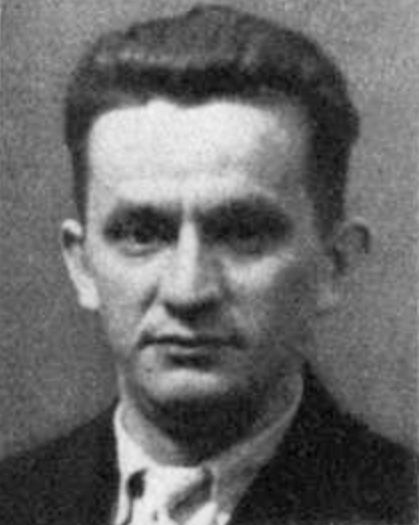
Albert Funk, c. 1924

Albert Albin Funk (15 October 1894 – 27 April 1933) was a German communist politician, trade union leader and anti-Nazi resistance fighter.

== Biography ==
Funk was bone in to a family of miners and worked a miner himself. In 1913, he joined the German Miners' Union. During the First World War, he first completed his military service before being called up as a miner in 1917 and working in Zwickau. In 1918, he joined the USPD.

Funk became an executive in the Union of Manual and Intellectual Workers, He became chairman of his mine's works council and led the local action committee against the Kapp Putsch. Fired from his job, his employer was forced to reinstated after workers' protested his dismissal. He then became head of the local KPD branch in Herringen and chairman of the works council at the Heinrich-Robert mine. In 1929, he was expelled from the German miners' union and became a full-time cadre of the communist Revolutionary Trade Union Opposition (RGO), soon becoming part of its national leadership.

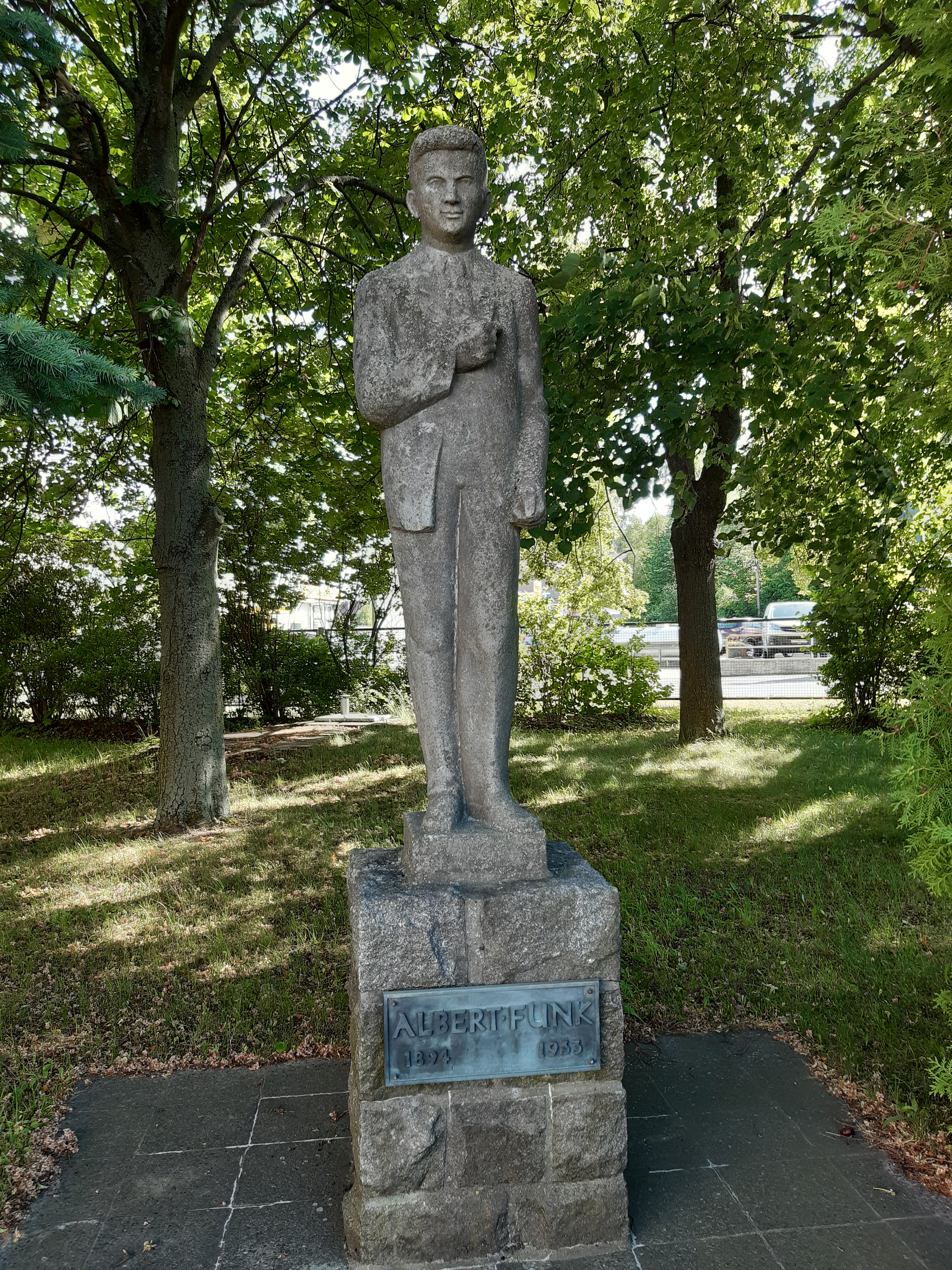
Memorial to Albert Funk in Freiberg

Funk was elected to the Reichstag on September 14, 1930, of which he was a member until 1932. In January 1931. He became president of the Unified Association of Miners of Germany, which collaborated with the RGO. November 1932. He later took over the leadership of the KPD party committee in Dortmund.

After the Nazis seized power, Funk was arrested in Dortmund on April 16, 1933 after being suspected of clandestine reconstitution of the KPD and was transferred to the Recklinghausen police headquarters on April 27 where he is interrogated and severely mistreated.

It was only later revealed in October 1949 "that F.[unk], under the influence of the physical and psychological torment he had suffered, threw himself from the third floor of the police headquarters into the courtyard." Funk survived the fall with serious injuries and died the same day in Prosper Hospital. In 1949, the Bochum court sentenced the Gestapo officer responsible for the interrogation to twelve years in prison.
