= Fritz Schulte =

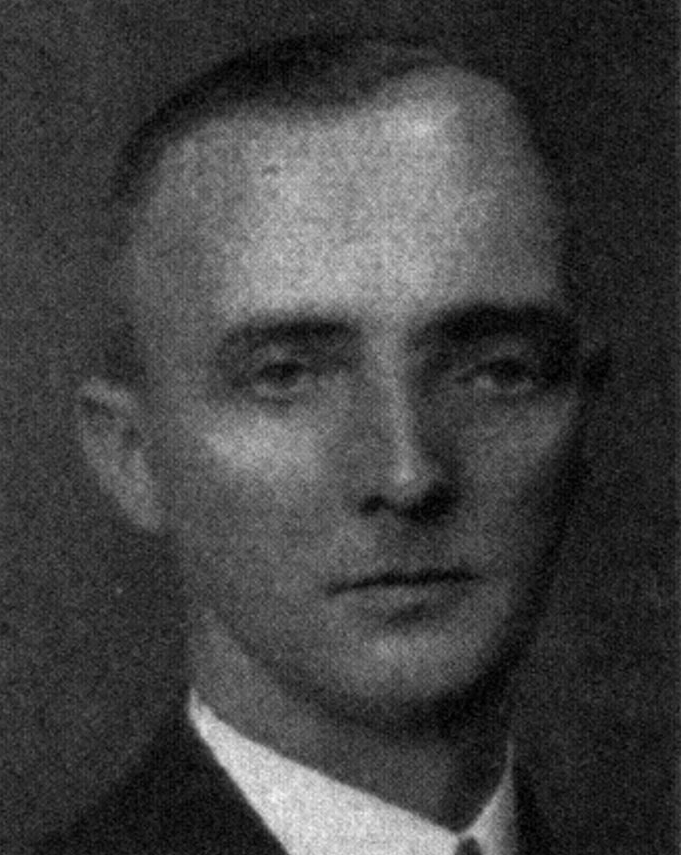
- Schulte c. 1930

National Leader of the Revolutionäre Gewerkschafts Opposition
- In office July 1932 – August 1933
- Preceded by: Franz Dahlem
- Succeeded by: Willi Agatz

Member of the Reichstag for Düsseldorf West
- In office 13 October 1930 – 28 February 1933
- Preceded by: Multi-member district
- Succeeded by: Constituency abolished

Member of the Landtag of Prussia for Düsseldorf East
- In office 14 June 1928 – 13 October 1930
- Preceded by: Multi-member district
- Succeeded by: Multi-member district

Personal details
- Born: 28 July 1890 Hüsten, Province of Westphalia, Kingdom of Prussia, German Empire
- Died: 10 May 1943 (aged 52) Gulag, Soviet Union
- Party: USPD (1918–1920); KPD (1920–1938)
- Spouse: "Emmi Schweitzer" / Gertrud Schorn
- Children: Fritz
- Occupation: Industrial Worker; Political Activist; Party Functionary; Politician

Military service
- Allegiance: German Empire
- Branch/service: Imperial German Army
- Years of service: 1914–1918
- Battles/wars: World War I
- Central institution membership: 1929–1935: Full member, KPD Politburo; 1927–1935: Full member, KPD Central Committee; Other offices held: 1927, 1928–1931: Political Leader, Lower Rhine KPD; 1926–1927: Organizational Leader, Lower Rhine KPD; 1923–1925: Political Leader, Leverkusen-Wiesdorf KPD; 1923–1925: Organizational Leader, Leverkusen-Wiesdorf KPD

Fritz Schulte (28 July 1890 – 10 May 1943) sometimes identified in contemporary sources by his later party code name as Fritz Schweizer, was a prominent and increasingly influential member of the German Communist Party leadership team between 1922 and 1934.

He represented a Düsseldorf electoral district as a member of the Reichstag (German parliament) between 1930 and the abolition of democracy three years later. As a well-known communist leader, he was forced to flee the country, and in December 1934 ended up in Moscow.

Like many left-wing political refugees from Hitler's Germany, during the years that followed he fell foul of the Soviet dictator's intensifying paranoia. He died as an inmate of a Soviet labour camp, almost certainly as a result of torture suffered during the course of a long succession of questioning sessions conducted by the Soviet security service. After the war ended he was scapegoated by the party leadership in the Soviet sponsored German Democratic Republic (East Germany), following East Germany's launch in October 1949. It was said that as a member of the Communist Party leadership before 1933 he had been responsible for allowing the National Socialists to take power because he had fomented bitter division between the Communist Party and the centre-left Social Democratic Party. After 1945 the need for the political left to remain united emerged as a central tenet of the new political establishment in East Germany. Mainstream commentators nevertheless agree that the blame for the bitter feuding on the political left in Germany before 1933 should more properly be imputed to the Communist Party leader of that time, Ernst Thälmann, who had for many years taken his lead from Stalin in condemning the Social Democrats as "Social Fascists" and refusing, in defiance of the more nuanced strategic perceptions of comrades, to contemplate any sort of political alliance or other arrangement with them. Thälmann had been shot in response to a personal order from Adolf Hitler, after eleven years as an inmate of successive prisons and concentration camps, on 18 August 1944.

The East German party leadership had cast Thälmann as a heroic martyr figure: there could be no question of blaming either Thälmann or Stalin (who remained alive and very much in power till 1953) for the feuding on the political left in Germany during the 1920s and early 1930s.

== Life ==
=== Provenance and early years ===
Fritz Schulte was born in Hüsten during the high period of Wilhelmine Germany. Hüsten was a small industrial town set in the countryside to the east of Dortmund which had been dominated since the 1840s by a single enterprise, the "Hüstener Gewerkschaft" (a large steel mill). His father was a factory worker. The family was powerfully Roman Catholic, and Fritz Schulte is reported to have served for a number of years as a youthful official with Catholic youth organisations, although by the time he grew up he was describing himself as "religionslos" or a "Dissident", indicating subsequent rejection of organised religion. Schulte attended school locally and then moved some 50 miles to the west of Dortmund, to Düsseldorf, where he took unskilled factory work between 1904 and 1912, before going on to work at a Bayer chemicals plant in nearby Leverkusen.

=== Communist Party ===
Schulte was politicised by his experiences of the First World War, which broke out in July 1914 and lasted for more than four years. He fought as a soldier in the German army. When he returned home he joined the Independent Social Democratic Party ("Unabhängige Sozialdemokratische Partei Deutschlands" / USPD) which had broken away from the mainstream Social Democratic Party a couple of years earlier as a result of intensifying dissent among party members over the leadership decision back in 1914 to vote in favour of war funding measures. After the Communist Party of Germany was founded at the end of 1918 Schulte initially opposed proposals that the USPD should merge with it, but as the USPD splintered apart he was one of many comrades who had a change of heart. However, during 1920 he was appalled at the way in which many industrial workers in Leverkusen were being treated: this drove him, in December 1920, to cross over to the Communist Party. Over the next few years he took on a succession of administrative posts in it.

At the Bayer plant he became the Works Council chairman. In 1921 he was expelled from the "Fabrikarbeiterverband" (trades union) in the context of a major strike at the plant, and after speaking out in support of the political split within the union which took place shortly afterwards. Schulte himself emerged as a leading figure within the radical left wing break-away group, becoming in 1922 full-time secretary of the new - Communist Party oriented - trades union that had resulted from the split. During 1923 he spent three months in Berlin as a trainee in the party's trades unions department. Then, till 1925, he worked for the party local group in Leverkusen-Wiesdorf, first as an "Organisationsleiter" and then, in the more influential position of a "Polleiter" (loosely, "policy leader"). As "Polleiter" Schulte acquired a reputation as a particularly aggressive advocate of communist doctrine, acquiring among comrades in the region the soubriquet "the Noske of the Lower Rhine". (Note: This was a reference to Gustav Noske, Germany's controversial Defence Minister during 1919/20 who acquired a reputation for brutality among leftwing activists on account of his willingness to use troops to suppress incipient revolution on the streets.) He was also a member of the Unterbezirksleitung (sub-district leadership team) for the party in the Solingen region. Through the 1920s the Communist Party remained fractious, and it may have been in part a reflection of his early hesitancy about joining the party at its launch that Schulte was regarded as a representative of the party's right wing. In 1923 he was reportedly talking about "the idiot Thälmann" which cannot have endeared him to his (sometime) political mentor the man who emerged after a few more years of splits and divisions as the party leader. In 1924 he was still reading the (illegal) pamphlets circulated by the party's "Brandler faction". However, during 1924, possibly in response to a more general shift in mood within the party, he made his own decisive switch to the Communist Party's increasingly powerful left wing. Later that year he was accepted as a member of the "Bezirksleitung Niederrehin" party leadership team for the entire Lower Rhine region. Within the team, in July 1925 he became "Secretary for Communal Policy" and then "Secretary for Agitation and Propaganda", a role to which the Communist Party - taking its leader from the Communist Party of the Soviet Union - attached great importance. Further appointments included that of "Organisationsleiter" in May 1926 and in 1927 of "Polleiter", again in respect of the entire Lower Rhine region. Schulte was for a short time replaced in the role by Lex Ende, apparently in order to that he might be made more available for national party functions.

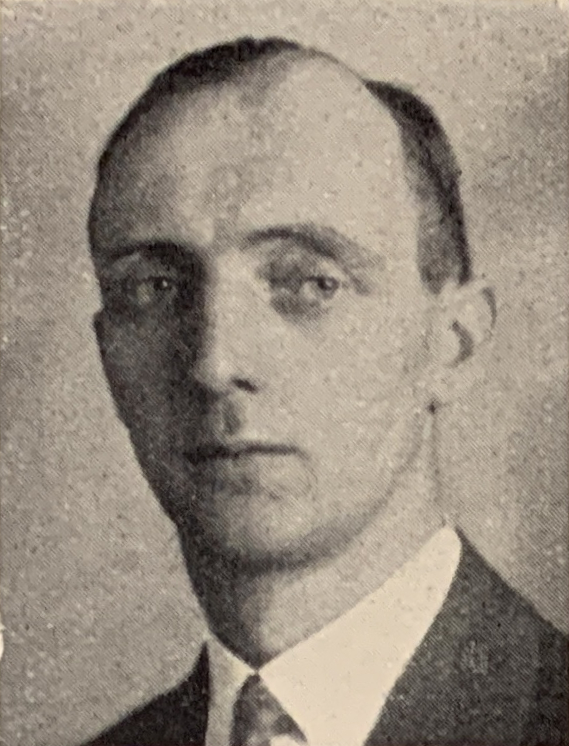
Schulte's official Landtag portrait, 1928

At the Communist Party's eleventh party congress, held in Essen during the first week of March 1927, Schulte was elected to the Party Central Committee. By this time he had already been a deputy member of the Prussian State Council, the upper, indirectly elected, house of the Prussian parliament, since February 1926. Between 1928 and his resignation from it in 1930 he served, in addition, as a full member of the Landtag of Prussia, the more directly elected lower house. In 1928, during July/August, he spent a month on Moscow attending a course organised by the party. During 1928/29 he also held an important trades union position as a member of the national committee of the "Revolutionäre Gewerkschafts Opposition" (RGO), the slightly shadowy parallel German trades union confederation with close links both to the German Communist Party and to Moscow which never quite achieved the traction with German workers that its backers had hoped. Between July 1932 and 1933, possibly at the suggestion of party leader Ernst Thälmann, Schulte served as the official national leader of the RGO in succession to Franz Dahlem.

In September 1930 Schulte was elected to membership of the Reichstag (German parliament), representing Electoral District 22 (Düsseldorf-East). He was re-elected in the General Election of July 1932 and again in that of November 1932. with the difference that after each of the 1932 elections he sat as a member representing Electoral District 23 (Düsseldorf-West). The period was one of parliamentary deadlock during most of which the principal extremist parties held more than 50% of the seats. Since neither the leaders of the Communist Party nor of the National Socialist Party had any particular commitment to parliamentary democracy they refused to work either with each other or with members of the more moderate parties. To the extent that government enacted any legislative changes at all, it did so by emergency decree. Sources are silent as to what, if anything, Fritz Schulte contributed as a member of the Reichstag.

Schulte remained engaged in the internal politics of the Communist Party from his "Lower Rhine" power base, irrespective of any parliamentary or other political duties in Berlin. In the aftermath of the Wittorf scandal he stepped forward as leader of the party's left-wingers, in opposition to the so-called compromisers. "Regional Polleiter" Lex Ende, who was seen as having ended up on the wrong side of the relevant moral arguments, was removed from his regional leadership post to which, in November 1928, Schulte was restored. An indication that he remained at this stage influential in the national party came at the twelfth party congress, which took place at Berlin-Wedding during June 1929. Schulte was re-elected to the Party Central Committee and also, this time, elected to membership of the central committee's inner caucus, the Politburo. From now on, however, the Comintern and the Soviet party Moscow began to take an increasingly hands-on approach to its German sister party. Ernst Thälmann's poor judgement in respect of the Wittorf scandal had left him exposed to criticism from comrades in the upper echelons of the German party. In the event, however, Wittorf was almost immediately purged from party agendas. Thälmann's leadership became more secure than ever, due to the powerfully supportive currents created by Stalin's backing. But Thälmann was no longer his own man, while those who had been critical of his involvement in the Wittorf affair, among whom Fritz Schulte was prominently undiplomatic, found themselves being distanced from party decision making. At the next party congress, held under conditions of some difficulty in 1935, the size of the Party Central Committee would be much reduced, and Schulte would no longer be in it. After 1929 he nevertheless remained installed as the party's "Regional Polleiter" for the entire "Lower Rhine" region for another two years, till 1931.

=== Hitler years and political exile in Paris (1933 to 1935) ===
In January 1933, exploiting the deadlocked political situation, the Hitler government took power and lost no time in transforming Germany into a one-party dictatorship. Immediately after the Reichstag Fire at the end of February 1933 the authorities began seeking out and arresting (and worse) those identified as government opponents, concentrating in the first instance on communist leaders. Both on account of his position as a senior party official and because he was a well-known communist member of the Reichstag (parliament), Schulte was at particularly acute risk of government persecution from National Socialists and their paramilitary backers. Political work - unless in support of the government - became illegal, but Schulte nevertheless remained engaged, avoiding arrest by "going underground", which meant staying away from one's registered home address and in other ways avoiding the security services by all possible means. He was nevertheless able to meet up with comrades, notably Walter Ulbricht, John Schehr and Hermann Schubert. Government persecution made party reorganisation of the party structure unavoidable, and these four men became the core of the so-called "homeland leadership" ("Inlandführung") team operating "underground" in order to stay out of the reach of the security services. Other leading party figures fled abroad and set up a party leadership team in (at this stage) Paris. The four who stayed in Germany thereby became the only members of the party politburo who stayed in Berlin. Between Ulbricht, Schehr and Schubert a struggle for leadership developed, from which Schulte seems to have remained detached.

In the fall/autumn of 1933 the four men were ordered by the party leaders who had made the French capital their base, to relocate to Paris. They complied. Schulte, crossing the border to the south of Berlin and travelling via Prague, became the last of the four to leave Berlin. He had been, in addition, the last member of the party politburo to leave Germany in the wake of the Hitler take-over. He now remained in Paris between 1933 and 1935.

In Paris, Schulte found himself allied with Hermann Schubert, as the two of them adopted the party tactics of imposing control by means of the "ultra-leftist intransigence" to which comrades had become accustomed during the period of Thälmann's leadership. During 1934 they found the support for their approach slipping away, however. Both Schubert and Schulte found themselves increasing marginalised within the leadership group, as other former Central Committee members came to favour a "united front" strategy, necessary to resist the still intensifying tide of fascism. Meanwhile, between 1933 and 1935 Schulte briefly resumed at least nominal leadership of the RGO; but the RGO itself was already collapsing, crushed in Germany by the government, while outside Hitler's reach exiled elements decided that the movement had become, at best, a distraction from the need to unite against Hitler.

Within the party Schulte retained his political ambitions. In December 1934 he travelled to Moscow in order to campaign for election to the presidium of the Comintern. Elections were held in August 1935 at the Comintern's Seventh "World Congress" (which turned out to be the final such congress prior to the dissolution of the organisation in 1943). Schulte's candidacy for presidium membership failed.

=== Hitler years and political exile in Moscow (1935 to 1941) ===
After 1935 Fritz Schulte relocated to Moscow along with other members of the German party politburo. Some sources indicate that Moscow now became the principal semi-official homebase for the exiled German party leadership, while elsewhere it is indicated that Moscow was one of three such locations. Paris and, at least till 1938, Prague are also sometimes identified as informal headquarter locations for exiled German party leaders. After 1949 enduring mistrust between leading German communists, such as Walter Ulbricht and Wilhelm Pieck, who had spent most of the war years in Moscow and those, such as Franz Dahlem and Paul Merker, who had not, was to become a feature of the ongoing rivalries within the ruling party in the Soviet sponsored East German dictatorship. Schulte himself settled in Moscow in 1934 por 1935 only after a lengthy stay in Prague. Meanwhile his wife, identified in some sources as "Emmi Schweitzer", (Note: Elsewhere Fritz Schulte's wife is named not as Emmi Schweitzer but as Gertud Schorn. It is not entirely clear from the sources accessed whether, at different times, Schulte had two wives, or whether "Emmi Schweitzer" was a no more than a party cover name. From the few sources that mention her at all, however, it appears probable that there was only ever one wife. Party cover names were commonly assumed by German communist activists and their associates after 1933, as part of a strategy for avoding arrest. During and after 1935 Schulte himself was frequently identified using the cover name "Fritz Schweitzer".) and the couple's son, both of whom had remained in Germany, were taken into "Protective custody".

It was under the cover name "Fritz Schweitzer" that Schulte participated in the misleadingly named "Brussels Conference", held during October 1935 at Kunzewo, just outside Moscow. The conference was marked by dramatic change in the party hagiography: these changes were not to Schulte's advantage. The Thälmann line of the later 1920s and early 1930s, whereby German politicians of the moderate left were consistently and passionately condemned as "Social Fascists" was repudiated. Ernst Thälmann himself, who continued to enjoy Stalin's favour, had now been imprisoned by the National Socialists and, as a probable future martyr to the cause, was already being prepared for political canonisation. There could be no question of blaming Thälmann for a strategy that had split the political left in Germany and handed the keys of power in Berlin to Adolf Hitler. Scapegoats were needed. Four men, in particular, were singled out. Fritz Schulte, Hermann Schubert, Heinz Neumann and Hermann Remmele were given the blame for the misguided policy. Long before the Hitler nightmare was ended in a Berlin bunker, all four of them would have died in the Soviet Union. More immediately, at the conference all four found that they had been removed from the Party Central Committee. Coincidentally (or not) it was also at the "Brussels Conference" that Walter Ulbricht and Wilhelm Pieck emerged as the "obvious" leaders of the Communist Party in exile.

Between 15 December 1935 and 1 June 1936 Schulte was placed in charge of the "Agitation and Propaganda" office at the "Profintern" ("Red International of Labour Unions " / "Красный интернационал профсоюзов"), an offshoot of the Comintern tasked with international coordination of communist activism in trades union movements. He was then removed and sent to work in a large Moscow-based company. Naturally, during what was a period of great paranoia on the part of the Soviet leadership, especially in respect of all the foreign political exiles living in Moscow, he was kept under surveillance. There are indications that the new leadership of the exiled German party may have been plotting his further degradation ("Zersetzung") and destruction. It later emerged that one of those reporting on Schulte and his allegedly dubious "connections" to the Soviet security services was Herbert Wehner, a fellow communist exile living in Moscow who much later came to prominence in West Germany as a canny pipe-smoking Minister of Intra-German Relations and long-standing leader of the Social Democratic parliamentary group in the West German Bundestag. One of Wehner's reports that survives (and which may, of course, have been dictated to him only under duress) identifies Schulte as the "leader of the sectarian opposition in the Communist Party of Germany".

=== Arrest and death ===
It appears from Wehner's reports that by the end of 1937 Schulte had been identified as a Trotskyite (and thereby an enemy of Stalin's government). He was arrested on 21 February 1938, one of many "Чистка" (purge) victims arrested in Moscow at around the same time. According to one source he became paralyzed through a series of brutal torture sessions. A surviving indictment is dated 2 March 1939.

On 7 April 1941 an NKVD "special tribunal" sentenced Schulte to an eight year term of detention at a labo(u)r camp. He was sent to the camp at Sewpetsch (far to the north, inside the arctic circle) and placed on a programme of "Исправительные работы" (loosely, "correctional work"). Fritz Schulte died at the labour camp on 10 May 1943, his death having almost certainly been hastened by the harsh living and working conditions top which he had been subjected in the Soviet "correctional" camp. His son, also called Fritz Schulte, had become a wartime soldier and was "killed in action" soon afterwards in the fighting on the Russian front.

There are reports that in Moscow, during the period identified in some sources as the Khrushchev Thaw, Fritz Schulte was probably posthumously "rehabilitated" on 26 March 1956. If that was indeed the case, then it appears that no one bothered to communicate the information to his widow in West Germany. Gertrud Schulte was still alive in 1960: in October of that year she placed a "wanted photograph" of her late husband in "Die Tat", a weekly magazine produced by the "Vereinigung der Verfolgten des Naziregimes" ("Union of Persecutees of the Nazi Regime").
