= Wilhelm Florin =

German politician

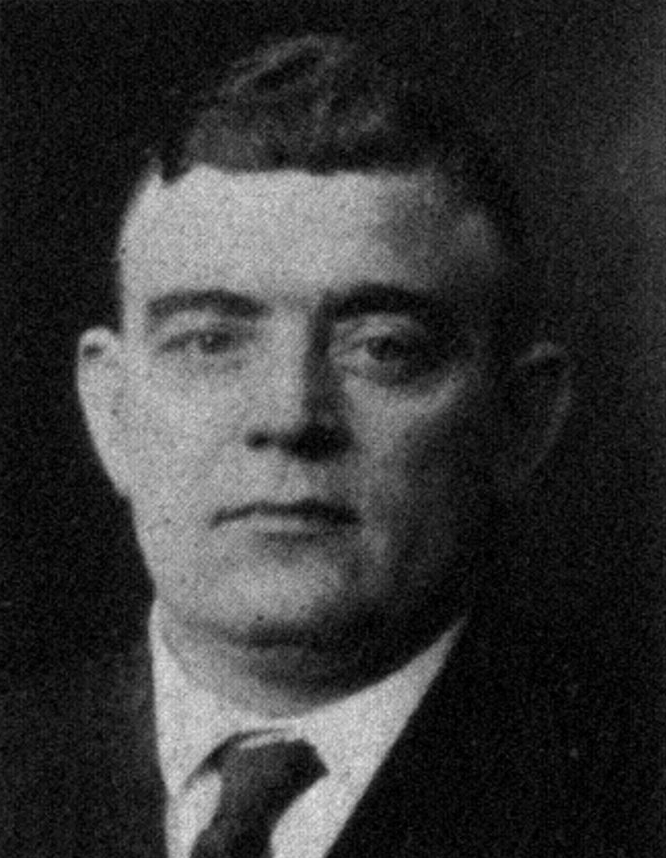
- Florin c. 1930

Member of the Reichstag for Westphalia North
- In office 27 May 1924 – 28 February 1933
- Preceded by: Multi-member district
- Succeeded by: Constituency abolished

Personal details
- Born: 16 March 1894 Cologne, German Empire
- Died: 5 July 1944 (aged 50) Moscow, Soviet Union
- Resting place: Zentralfriedhof Friedrichsfelde
- Party: USPD (1917–1920); KPD (after 1920)
- Spouse: Therese Althammer
- Children: Peter

Military service
- Allegiance: German Empire
- Branch/service: German Imperial Army
- Years of service: 1914–1918
- Battles/wars: World War I (WIA)
- Central institution membership: 1929–1937: Full member, KPD Politburo; 1924–1944: Full member, KPD Central Committee (Note: Zentrale until 1925); Other offices held: 1932–1933: Political Leader, Berlin-Brandenberg KPD; 1925–1932: Political Leader, Ruhr KPD; 1925: Political Leader, Thuringia KPD; 1924–1925: Political Leader, Upper Silesia KPD; 1923: Organizational Leader, Middle Rhine KPD

Wilhelm Florin (16 March 1894 – 5 July 1944) was a German communist politician and trade unionist who served as a leading functionary in the Communist Party of Germany (KPD). An ally of party leader Ernst Thälmann, Florin belonged to the party's Central Committee from 1924 until his death in 1944, and its Politburo from 1929 until its dissolution in 1937. He led the party in several regions and was responsible for their adherence to the Stalinist party line.

== Life ==
=== Early years ===
Wilhelm Florin was born in Poll, already a suburb of Cologne, across the river and to the south-east of the city centre. His family was working-class and strongly Catholic; early on he became involved with the Catholic Young Men's Association. He qualified as a riveter and worked in several metal based factories making items such as wagons and boilers. By 1913 he was also a member both of the German Metal Workers' Union and of the Socialist Youth Organisation.

=== War ===
In 1914 he was drafted into the infantry. During the war he was wounded and, for a period in 1917, sent to join a punishment unit. This was because he became opposed to the war and in 1917 joined the newly formed Independent Social Democratic Party of Germany (USPD), which had broken away from the mainstream Social Democratic Party of Germany (SPD) over the issue of support for the war.

=== Weimar years ===
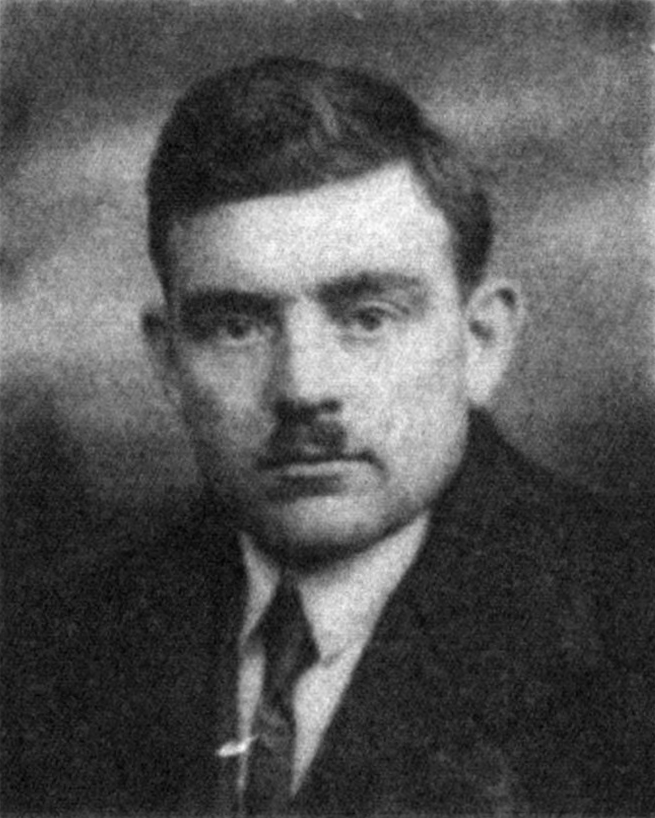
Florin's official Reichstag portrait, 1924

When the USPD itself split in 1920 Florin was a part of the left-wing faction that joined Germany's fledgling Communist Party of Germany (KPD). Between 1918 and 1920 Florin was a member of the Works Council at a Cologne river-ship yard. He was also a Works Council leader at the gas-engine factory where he worked in the early 1920s, and continued as a volunteer union activist till 1923. That was the year in which, at the instigation of Eugen Eppstein, Florin was appointed Leader of the KPD Organisation and Publicity Department for the Middle-Rhine region, an appointment that was formally terminated at the end of that year when the French, who were still occupying the Rhineland militarily, expelled him from the region. Florin nevertheless continued, now illegally, with his political activities.

1924 saw a change of leadership in the KPD, with Ernst Thälmann increasingly in the ascendant. Party strategy was now more closely aligned with that of allies in Moscow, as the KPD abandoned the goal of immediate revolution, and decided to participate in the country's emerging democracy. Wilhelm Florin was selected as a parliamentary candidate at the start of 1924 and was elected to the Reichstag in May 1924; he remained a prominent KPD member of the body until 1933. While a Reichstag deputy he was at the same time temporarily serving as the party's political leader for the Thuringia and Upper Silesia regions.

Following interventions by Josef Stalin, Ruth Fischer and Arkadi Maslow were removed from the party leadership team in Germany. Florin stood by Ernst Thälmann and was appointed political leader of the party's faction-ridden Ruhr district in 1925. He oversaw a reorganisation that saw it following the Stalinist line by 1932. Florin was re-elected to the party central committee in 1927 and to the politburo in 1929, while the party press took to calling him "Leader of the Ruhr Proletariat" ("Führer des Ruhrproletariats"). In 1932 he replaced Walter Ulbricht as political leader in the party's Berlin-Brandenburg region. Die Rote Fahne, the party newspaper, celebrated the development by now calling him "Leader of the Berlin-Brandenburg Proletariat" ("Führer des Berlin-Brandenburger Proletariats").

=== Nazi years ===
After the Nazi seizure of power in January 1933, Florin participated at the (illegal) Central Committee meeting of the KPD, held on 7 February in the Sporthaus Ziegenhals at Ziegenhals, just outside Berlin on its south-eastern side. This was the last meeting to be addressed by the party leader, Ernst Thälmann, before his arrest by the Gestapo.

The Reichstag fire took place at the end of February, and Wilhelm Florin went underground before emigrating to the Soviet Union via Paris, which at this time was a destination of choice for many KPD members fearful for their lives and liberty if they remained in Germany. In the intensive party disputes that followed Hitler's take over, Florin initially sided with what was defined as the "extreme left" wing of the KPD, along with Hermann Schubert, Franz Dahlem and Fritz Schulte, but Florin, like others, very soon realigned his position to that of Walter Ulbricht and Wilhelm Pieck.

=== Exile and death ===
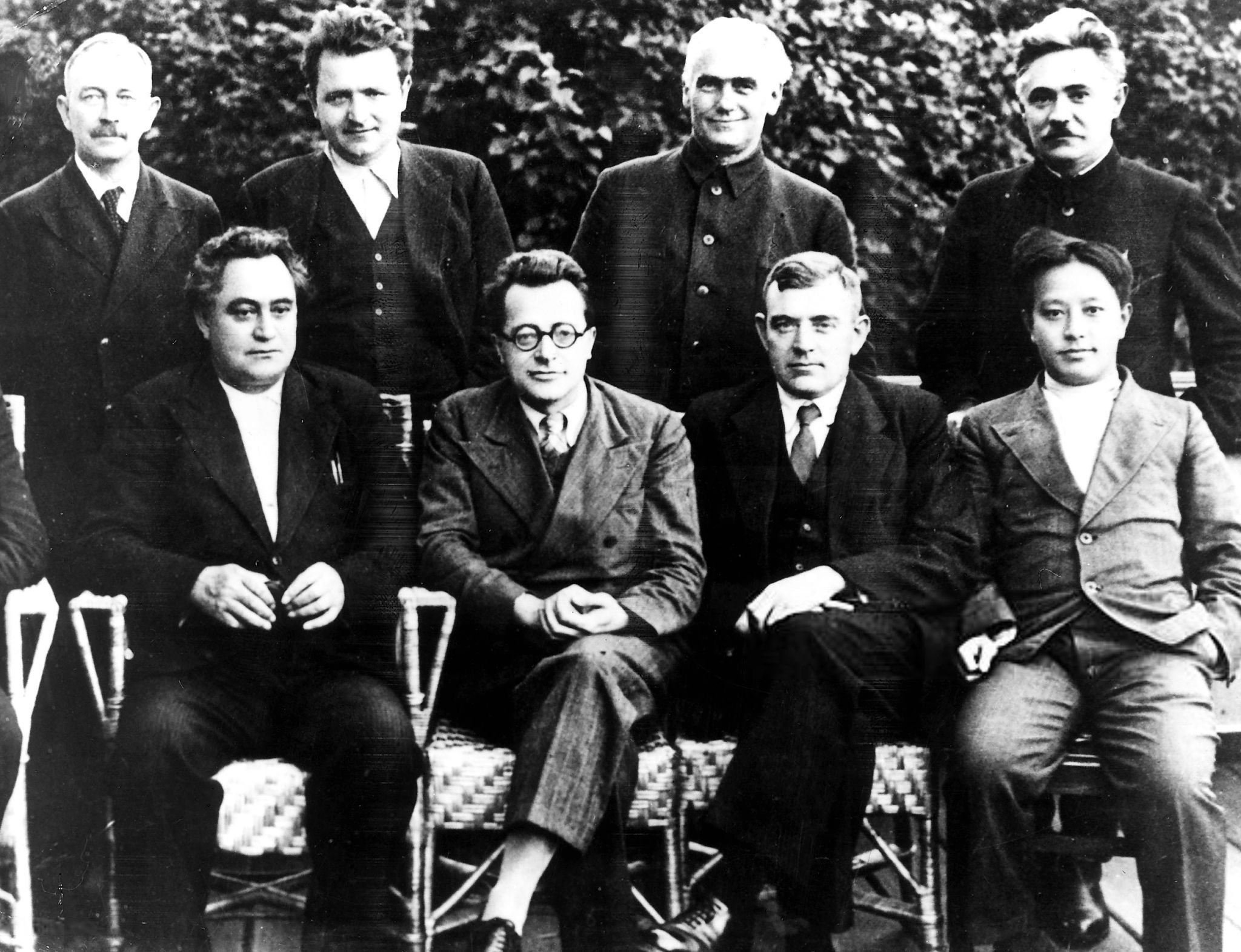
Members of the Executive Committee of the Comintern at the 7th World Congress, 1935. Seated (L-R): Georgi Dimitrov, Palmiro Togliatti, Wilhelm Florin, Wang Ming. Standing: Otto Kuusinen, Dmitry Manuilsky, Klement Gottwald, Wilhelm Pieck.

At the 7th World Congress of the Comintern in 1935 Florin was a member both of the organisation's executive committee and of its International Control Commission, positions he retained until the Comintern itself was unceremoniously dissolved in 1943. From 1943 till his death Wilhelm Florin was an active founding member of the Moscow-based National Committee for a Free Germany.

Florin died in Moscow on 5 July 1944 as a result of a short illness, and was initially buried in Moscow. However, in 1955 an urn containing his ashes was conveyed to Berlin and placed in the Socialists' Commemoration section of the Friedrichsfelde Central Cemetery

== Family ==
Wilhelm Florin's wife Therese Florin (born Therese Althammer) was for many years Deputy Chair of the Democratic Women's League of Germany. His son, Peter Florin, was a top East German diplomat.

== Speeches and writings ==
- Gegen den Faschismus. Reden und Aufsätze. Mit einem biographischen Abriss. Berlin 1986, ISBN 3-320-00648-7
