= Revolutionäre Gewerkschafts Opposition =

Union logo c. 1931

The Revolutionäre Gewerkschafts-Opposition (Revolutionary Union Opposition) was the communist trade union in Germany during the Weimar Republic. It went underground after the Nazi Party seized control of the government and continued operating until it was crushed by the Nazis in 1935.

== Weimar era ==
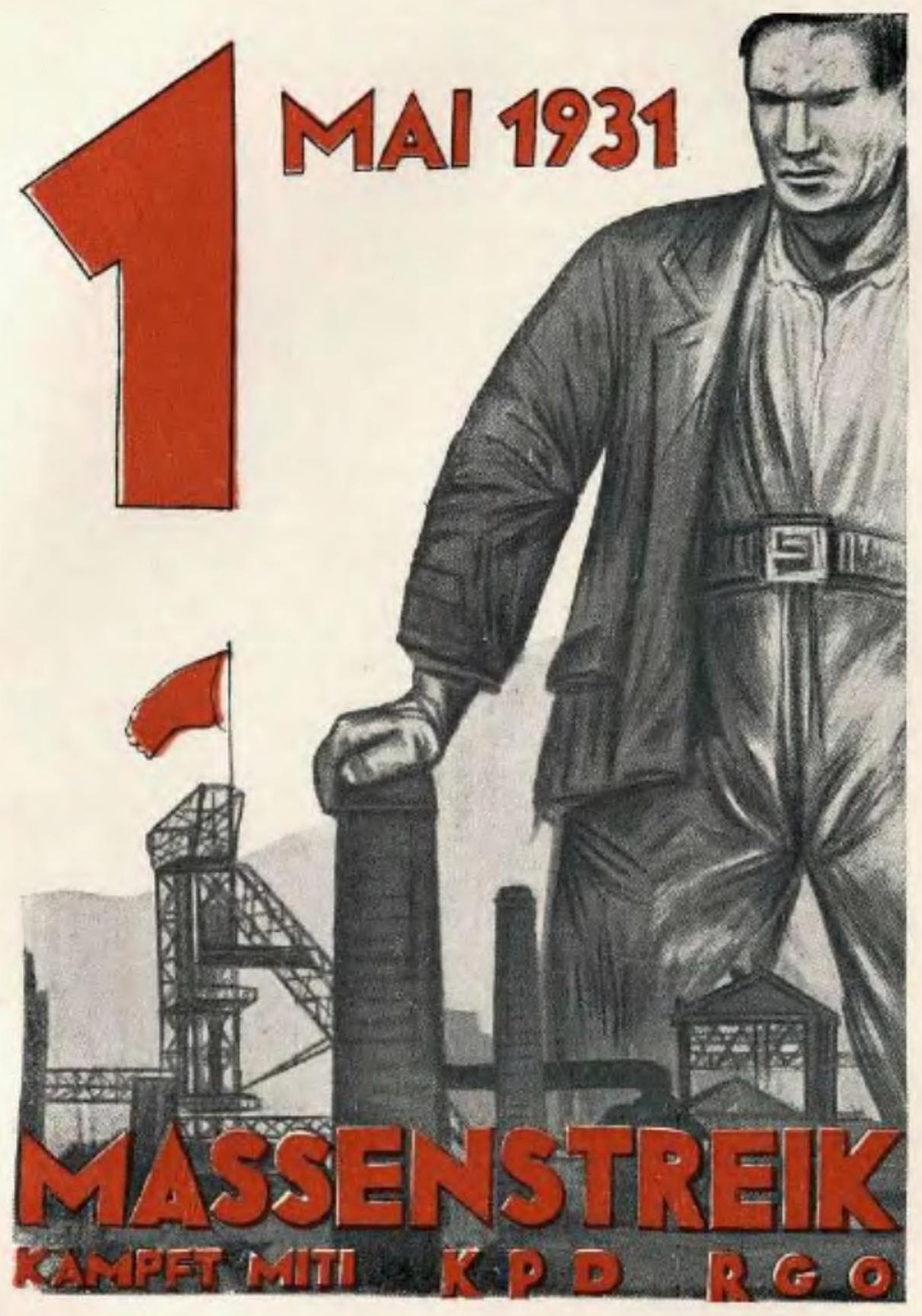
"1 May 1931, Mass Strike, Fight With The KPD RGO"

The Communist International (Comintern) and the Communist Party of Germany (KPD) had both wanted to create their own revolutionary unions and had attempted to use the Union of Manual and Intellectual Workers (UMIW), which had a high proportion of KPD members within its ranks, to that end. The KPD's relationship with the UMIW was strained by the lack of discipline within the Union and eventually, the relationship was ended.

In 1928, after the 4th World Congress of the Profintern and the 6th World Congress of the Comintern, Communists took an ultra-left position toward social democrats, branding them as "social fascists". Efforts to establish an independent union were renewed, and the KPD began to systematically set up an opposing faction within the Allgemeiner Deutscher Gewerkschaftsbund (ADGB).

On March 14, 1929, the central committee of the KPD decided to register as members people who had been expelled as radicals from a trade union. In June 1929, Michael Niederkirchner was expelled from the German Metal Workers' Federation and founded an aid organization for others who had been expelled, which later became the core of the RGO. The KPD founded the RGO in December 1929 with the idea of consolidating the left within the ADGB. Those KPD members still in the ADGB became the principal opposition from within.

As of 1930, the RGO was promoted as a "red class trade union" and several cross-over campaigns were initiated, but never to great success. The RGO had a membership in 1932 of about 250,000 members. Large sections of the unionist wing of the KPD left the party and more than half of the RGO was unemployed. To bolster appearances, the RGO counted only admissions, not those who dropped out. Because the Communists lost influence in the trade unions from people leaving, and to a lesser extent, from expulsions, in 1931, they changed their strategy. Communists were to mount opposition within the ADGB and other such groups in order to strengthen "red associations", organizations that would develop into Communist unions. This turned the RGO into a Communist front organization, but it was unable to convert itself into a Communist union movement. The three largest "red associations" organized were in metalworking, mining, and construction and even those were never more than 1% of the workforce. RGO leaders were never elected at normal union meetings; rather they emerged from the trade union section of the KPD's central committee.

In the 1932 Berlin transport strike, the RGO attracted national attention by joining the NSBO (the Nazi labor union) in support of a wildcat strike against the Berlin Transportation Company (BVG) which had cut wages.

After the Nazis seized power, they crushed the unions. On 2 May 1933, the SS and SA seized all the offices of the ADGB and its member unions. The RGO went underground and continued to function until it was crushed in 1935.

== Postwar era ==
After World War II, the Free German Trade Union Federation was established in East Germany as a unified trade union for Communists and others. In the 1970s, the Maoist Communist Party of Germany (Structural Organization) and the KPD/Marxist–Leninist tried to revive the RGO, but had little success.

== Leadership ==
List of Reichsleiters of the RGO
No.	Portrait	Name	Term of office		
No.	Portrait	Name	Took office	Left office	Time in office
1	Paul Merker	Paul Merker	December 1929	May 1930	5 months
2	Fritz Emrich	Fritz Emrich	June 1930	October 1930	4 months
3	Franz Dahlem	Franz Dahlem	November 1930	June 1932	1 year, 7 months
4	Fritz Schulte	Fritz Schulte	July 1932	August 1933	1 year, 1 month
5	Willi Agatz	Willi Agatz	September 1933	January 1934	4 months
