= Franz Dahlem =

German politician (1892–1981)

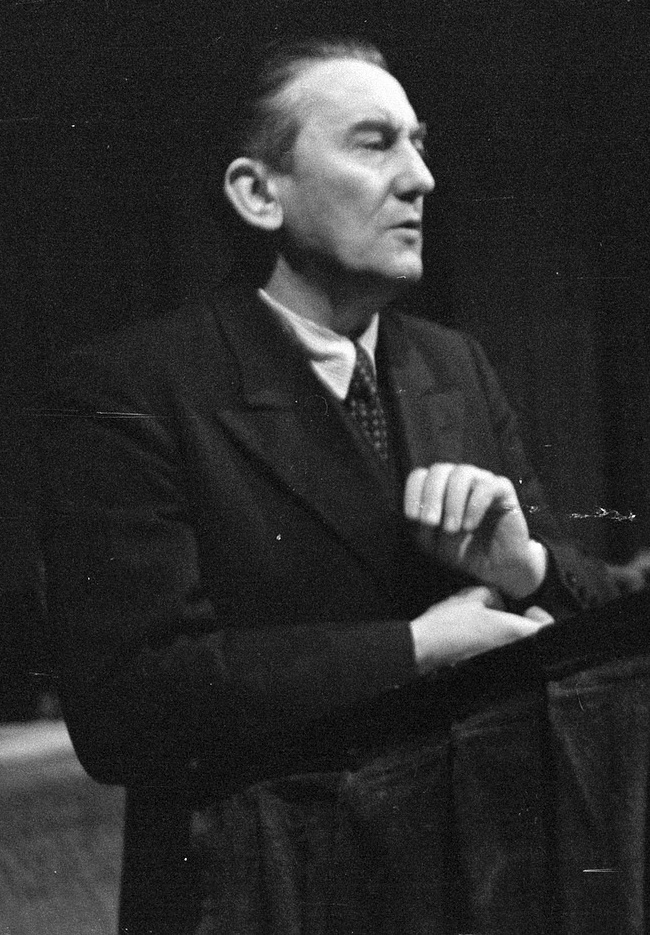
- Dahlem in 1946

Secretary for Cadre Affairs of the Party Executive Central Secretariat
- In office 23 April 1946 – 24 January 1949 Serving with Erich Gniffke
- Chairman: Wilhelm Pieck; Otto Grotewohl
- Preceded by: Position established
- Succeeded by: Walter Ulbricht

Secretary for Youth of the Party Executive Central Secretariat
- In office 23 April 1946 – 24 January 1949 Serving with Max Fechner
- Chairman: Wilhelm Pieck; Otto Grotewohl
- Preceded by: Position established
- Succeeded by: Edith Baumann

Secretary for Party Organs of the Party Executive Central Secretariat
- In office 23 April 1946 – 24 January 1949 Serving with Erich Gniffke
- Chairman: Wilhelm Pieck; Otto Grotewohl
- Preceded by: Position established
- Succeeded by: Karl Schirdewan (As Secretary of Leading Party Organs and Mass Organizations, 1952)

National Leader of the Revolutionäre Gewerkschafts Opposition
- In office November 1930 – June 1932
- Preceded by: Fritz Emrich
- Succeeded by: Fritz Schulte
Parliamentary constituencies
Member of the Volkskammer for Berlin
In office 20 October 1963 – 17 October 1976
| Preceded by | Multi-member district |
| Succeeded by | Multi-member district |
In office 18 March 1948 – 3 February 1954
| Preceded by | Constituency established |
| Succeeded by | Peter Florin |
Member of the Reichstag for Potsdam II
In office 1 July 1928 – 28 February 1933
| Preceded by | Multi-member district |
| Succeeded by | Constituency abolished |
Member of the Landtag of Prussia for Cologne–Aachen
In office 10 March 1921 – 5 January 1925
| Preceded by | Multi-member district |
| Succeeded by | Multi-member district |

Central Committee Secretariat (Note: Party Executive Committee Central Secretariat until July 1950.) responsibilities
- 1949–1952: KPD Working Office
- 1949–1952: West Department

Personal details
- Born: 14 January 1892 Rohrbach bei Bitsch, Elsaß-Lothringen, German Empire
- Died: 17 December 1981 (aged 89) East Berlin, East Germany
- Party: SPD (1913–1917); USPD (1917–1920); KPD (1920–1946); SED (1946–1981)
- Spouse: Käthe Weber (m. 1919; died 1974)
- Children: 4, including Robert
- Occupation: Politician; Civil Servant; Party Functionary
- Awards: Hans Beimler Medal; Order of Karl Marx; Patriotic Order of Merit; Star of People's Friendship

Military service
- Allegiance: German Empire; Spanish Republic
- Branch/service: Imperial German Army; International Brigades
- Years of service: 1914–1918; 1936–1938
- Rank: Commissar
- Battles/wars: World War I; Eastern Front (WIA); Spanish Civil War
- Central institution membership: 1949–1953: Full member, Politburo of the Central Committee; 1946–1953; 1957–1981: Full member, Central Committee (Note: Party Executive Committee until 1950); 1929–1946: Full member, KPD Politburo; 1928–1929: Candidate member, KPD Politburo; 1927–1946: Full member, KPD Central Committee; 1920–1921: Member, KPD Central Commission; Other offices held: 1967–1974: Deputy Minister, Ministry of Higher and Technical Education; 1929–1930: Member, Prussian State Council; 1928–1929: Deputy Member, Prussian State Council; 1924: Political Leader, Thuringia KPD; 1919–1923: Member, Cologne City Council

Franz Dahlem (14 January 1892 – 17 December 1981) was a German communist politician who was a leading official of the Socialist Unity Party (SED). Dahlem helped establish the SED and German Democratic Republic, and held senior positions in the Volkskammer and SED Central Committee.

Dahlem participated in the German revolution of 1918-19 and joined the Communist Party of Germany (KPD) during the Weimar Republic, serving as a KPD member in the Landtag of Prussia from 1921 to 1924 and the Reichstag from 1928 to 1933. Dahlem went into exile in France during the Nazi period and continued KPD activities until the end of the Second World War. Dahlem became well-known and popular in the SED leadership by the early 1950s and was seen by some as a possible rival to Walter Ulbricht. Dahlem was one of several high-ranking SED officials to be removed from power by Ulbricht after the Uprising of 1953. Dahlem was formally rehabilitated by the SED in 1956, serving on the Central Committee from 1957 until his retirement in 1974.

== Early life ==
Franz Dahlem was born on 14 January 1892 in Rohrbach bei Bitsch, a small town in Alsace–Lorraine, into a Low German-speaking Roman Catholic family. His father, Jacques Pierre Dahlem, was a railway worker. After attending middle school in Château-Salins, he went on to senior school at Sarreguemines, where his school career was curtailed due to lack of money. He was also a member of the Catholic Youth League at Sarreguemines between 1908 and 1911. He undertook a traineeship as an export salesman in Saarbrücken between 1911 and 1913. and / or Cologne In 1913, Dahlem joined the Social Democratic Party (SPD)., remaining a member of it until 1917.

Dahlem, despite his opposition to the First World War, served in the Imperial German Army between 1914 and 1918. However, when the SPD split in 1917, primarily over the issue of party support for continuing its support for the government line over the war, he chose the breakaway anti-war Independent Social Democratic Party (USPD). That year he was wounded in action while serving on the Eastern Front and, after being transferred to Macedonia, developed malaria which led to several periods in hospital.

In 1919, Dahlem married Käthe Weber, who shared in his political beliefs and activism.

== Weimar Republic ==
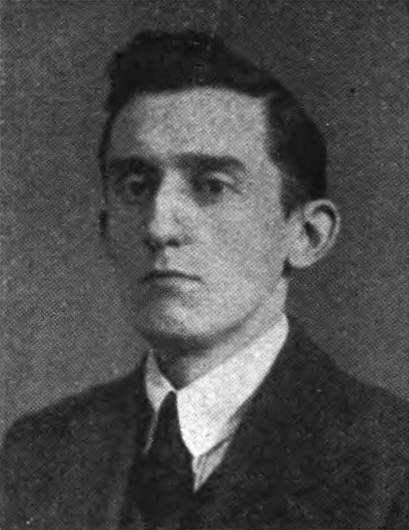
Dahlem's official Landtag of Prussia portrait, 1921

Following the war, Dahlem was involved in the German Revolution of 1918–19 and joined the workers' and soldiers' councils, initially in Allenstein in East Prussia, and subsequently in Cologne, participating in support of implementation of the slogan "All power to the councils" ("Alle Macht den Räten!"). He also co-founded and became the editor of Sozialistische Republik, a USPD newspaper in which he powerfully advocated the party's membership of the Comintern and a party merger with the new Communist Party of Germany (KPD). He also served, between 1919 and 1923, as a Cologne city councillor.

In December 1920, Dahlem took part in the "unification party conference" at which the radical "left wing" of the USPD merged with the KPD to form what was briefly known as the Unified Communist Party of Germany (VKPD). Here, together with Philipp Fries and Henriette Ackermann, he was elected to the local party leadership of the Middle Rhine region. He also briefly represented Middle Rhine nationally on the party Central Committee. In 1921, he was forced to surrender editorship of the Sozialistische Republik following his opposition to the March Action, but during 1921/22 he briefly edited the Berlin-based Internationalen Presse-Korrespondenz. When the French Army occupied the occupied the Ruhr in January 1923, Dahlem helped to organise "resistance to French and German imperialism" and sent by the party leadership to Paris in order to coordinate with the French Communist Party against the common enemy. From 1923, he was working in the Organisation Department of the party Central Committee. He was particularly effective in the application of "Leninist principles" to party organisation. In 1927, he himself joined the Central Committee, becoming a member of its Politburo just two years later. He also served briefly as political leader in Thuringia in 1924.

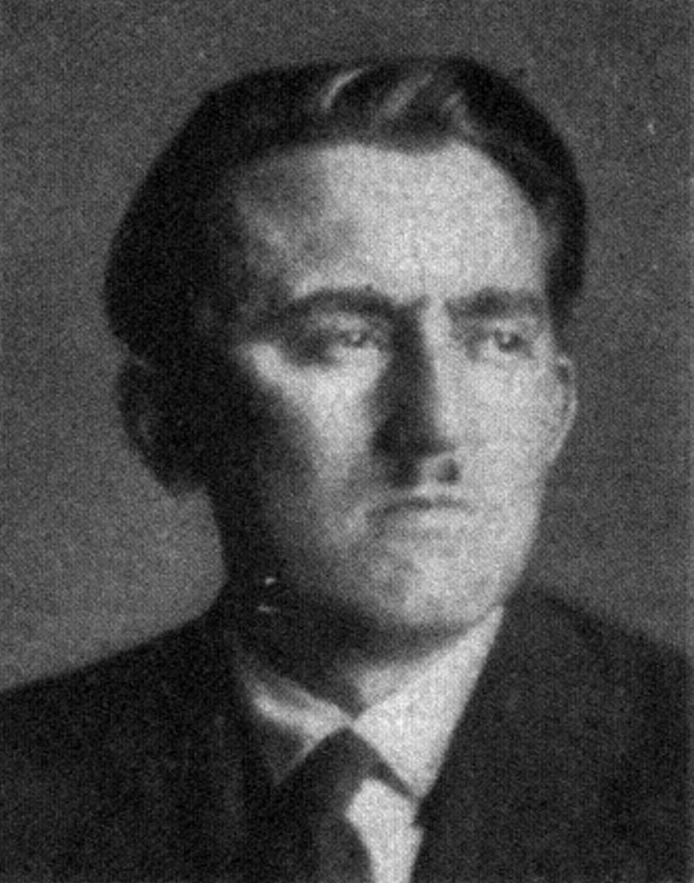
Dahlem's official Reichstag portrait, 1930

In addition to party work, Dahlem held several legislative offices in the Weimar Republic, sitting as a member in the Landtag of Prussia between 1921 and 1924, and as a member of the Reichstag, representing the Potsdam electoral district, between 1928 and 1933.

Recurring fragmentation was a feature of German left-wing politics in general and of the KPD in particular during the 1920s. One reason Dahlem was sent to Berlin in 1921 to edit the Internationalen Presse-Korrespondenz was to enforce his separation from Central Committee members in his Rhineland home patch at a time when he was opposing the party leadership. Areas of contention included both the party's attitude to the competing factions of Soviet communism during the Russian Civil War and the practical issue of how fast to progress the party's revolutionary objectives after what was seen as the failure of the revolution of 1918–1919. After 1923, with Grigory Zinoviev sidelined in Moscow and Joseph Stalin's control becoming more absolute, there was no longer any question of the KPD having to choose between competing versions of Soviet communism, and the party became more focused domestically. Dahlem was closely aligned with the strategy of the KPD leader Ernst Thälmann during a further period of internal fragmentation at the end of the 1920s. Thälmann's strategy, centered on the "social fascism" theory, was variously seen either as a determined policy to unite the working class behind the party in order to resist the rising Nazi Party, or else as an aggressive and sustained assault on the centre-left SPD which created a bitter division on the political left through which helped the Nazis find their path to power. In November 1930, Thälmann suggested that Dahlem take over the leadership of the Revolutionary Trades Union Opposition. He retained this function until he was replaced by Fritz Schulte in June 1932; Dahlem had supported Heinz Neumann in challenging Thälmann's focus on attacking the SPD.

== Nazi period and exile ==
The Nazis took power in January 1933 and they quickly began to establish a one-party dictatorship, putting members of the KPD in danger. Dahlem was one of approximately 40 party leaders who attended the eleventh party conference on 7 February 1933 at the Sporthaus Ziegenhals, a restaurant in the countryside just outside Berlin to the south. The meeting later achieved iconic status as the last meeting of the KPD until after 1945, and in 1953 the restaurant itself had been taken over and converted into a memorial centre. By that time many of those who had met in February 1933 had been killed or died in concentration camps.

In May 1933, under instructions from the party leadership, Dahlem himself fled to Paris with Wilhelm Pieck und Wilhelm Florin, which quickly became the de facto headquarters of the KPD. In 1934, he had taken French citizenship, which he would retain until 1941. His own membership of the Central Committee was confirmed in 1935, following internal party ructions during the early 1930s. In 1939, he was back in the party Politburo.

Dahlem was back in Berlin (secretly and illegally) between February and July 1934, undertaking "political work". Much of his activity was involved in trying to build and strengthen an Lutetia Circle, a left-wing anti-Nazi resistance organisation. In July 1935, he took part in the 7th World Congress of the Comintern. In 1936, after he had been undertaking "party work" in Prague for some months, he was stripped of his German citizenship. By 1937, the Spanish Civil War was becoming, for adherents of both sides, the fulcrum of the struggle between fascism and communism. Between 1936 and 1938, Dahlem was in charge of the Central Political Commission of the International Brigades in Spain. In 1938/39, he took over as leader of the Central Committee secretariat of the KPD in its Paris exile, in succession to Walter Ulbricht whose by this time, when not in Spain, was spending most of his time not in Paris but in the Soviet Union. Dahlem took the lead in preparing for and running the Bern Conference of the KPD in Paris, which took place in February 1939.

=== Second World War ===
In September 1939, the Wehrmacht launched its invasion of Poland, beginning the Second World War. The French government responded immediately by declaring war on Nazi Germany. For most people in Paris, it would be another eight months before the Battle of France fully impacted their daily life, but refugees from political persecution in Germany were affected sooner than most. Dahlem was one of thousands who were arrested, and he was placed in the concentration camp at Camp Vernet in the southwest of the country. He immediately communicated to French Prime Minister Édouard Daladier, offering the services of the KPD to the French Army and calling for close cooperation against the Nazis, but the offer was countermanded by the Comintern in Moscow. Meanwhile, his wife Käthe, who had accompanied her husband to Paris, relocated to Toulouse where, living illegally under the false name "Cathérine Dallerey", she acted as treasurer for the local KPD branch in exile between 1940 and 1944. It is known that she had contacts with the French Communist Party in the area and that she was in touch with party comrades interned at Camp Vernet. In 1941, while still at camp, Dahlen took Soviet citizenship. During the first part of 1941, a large group of German International Brigades veterans were liberated by members of the French Resistance from Camp Vernet, where security was poor. Dahlem was not one of those freed in this break-out, however, and the Gestapo ordered the Vichy government to hand him over immediately.

In October 1941, he was one of approximately 20 German prisoners removed to a secret prison at Castres. by the SS and handed over to the Gestapo. He was transferred to Berlin in August 1942, and spent the next eight months in the Gestapo headquarters bunker there. After this, he was transferred to the Mauthausen concentration camp in Upper Austria. According to one source, he survived his internment at Mauthausen only because of the solidarity shown to him by fellow veterans of the Spanish Civil War. Because of his Comintern involvement and his participation in Spain, Dahlen had a high-profile internationally at this time. In the United Kingdom in early 1942, a petition was signed by 350 people, including 98 members of the House of Commons and 40 members of the House of Lords, calling for the release of Dahlen, Luigi Longo and other opponents of the Nazi regime imprisoned at Castres.

== German Democratic Republic ==
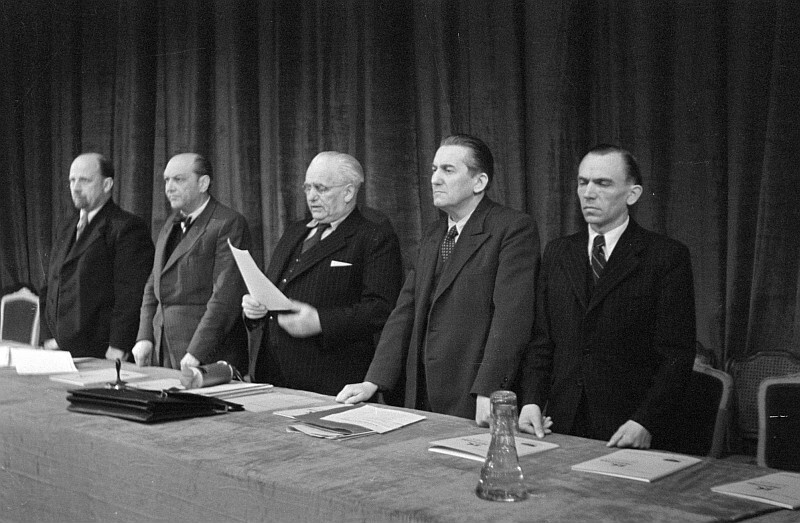
Dahlem (second from right) at the merger of the KPD and SPD in April 1946

On 7 May 1945, the day before German surrender, Dahlem was liberated from Mauthausen the Red army and taken to Moscow. Here he awaited the call from the KPD to return to Germany, which came through on 11 June, arriving back in Soviet Occupation Zone on 1 July with Pieck. Dahlem played a key role in establishing the German Democratic Republic (GDR or East Germany), a Soviet-backed state with its political, economic and social institutions modeled on those of the Soviet Union itself. A Marxist-Leninist one-party government was achieved through the creation of the Socialist Unity Party (SED) which was formally launched in April 1946 as the product of a contentious merger of the KPD and the branches of the SPD in the Soviet zone. By the time the GDR was launched in October 1949, most former SPD members had already been removed from positions of influence, and the SED had become a Soviet-style communist party by another name. The new state would achieve one-party government not by banning other political parties, but by controlling them using a bloc party under SED dominance. Dahlem played a leading role in the creation of the SED and the National Front, the notorious "single-list" voting system, had predetermined fixed quotas of seats in the Volkskammer occupied by approved representatives of their parties. While he did not oppose Stalinization or democratic centralism (at least not openly), he did stress the need for rank-and-file participation in the decision-making process, arguing that the party leadership could only be effective if they followed "the will of the party membership."

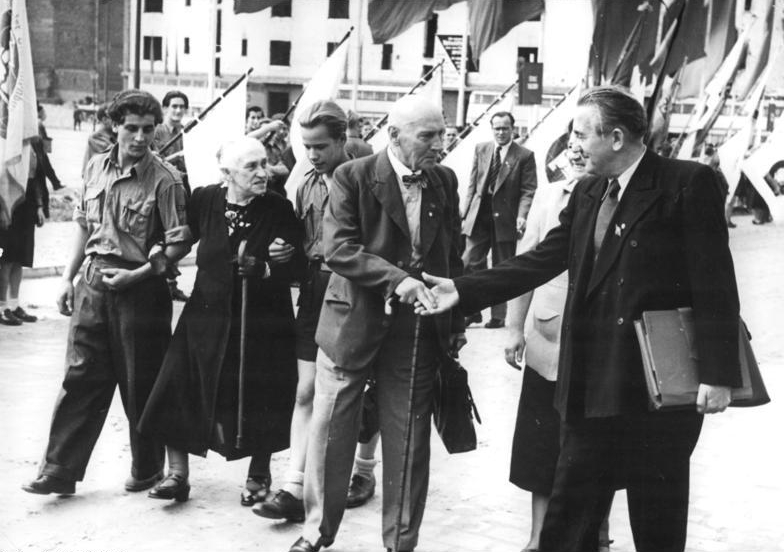
Dahlem welcoming two party veterans to the 3rd Congress of the SED, 1950

Dahlem served as a member of the SED Party Executive and its powerful Central Committee between 1946 and 1953. He was also leader of the party's "West Commission"; it is believed in some quarters that the Soviets had originally intended to impose the political structure created in the Soviet occupation zone across the three Western occupation zones. This never happened, but his leadership of the West Commission made Dahlem the de facto leader of the party in what would become, in May 1949, the Federal Republic of Germany (West Germany). His work gave him an extensive network of contacts within the party, and his widespread popularity led to talk of a rivalry with Ulbricht, the leader of the GDR as General Secretary of the SED.

=== Condemnation and rehabilitation ===
In March 1953, Stalin died without a designated successor and the subsequent power struggle in Moscow resonated powerfully in East Berlin. In both capitals, there was talk of a lessening of the "hardline Stalinism" of recent years, while harsh treatment of the civil population and the perception of a growing disparity between austerity levels in East Germany West Germany led to the Uprising of 1953 in June. It was suppressed with the help of Soviet Forces in Germany, and was followed by a period of heightened anxiety within the SED leadership. This in turn triggered a purge of senior party officials seen as insufficiently loyal to the party line, and therefore possible threats to the power base of Ulbricht. Dahlem's son Robert had been a leader of the strike and demonstrations in Rostock, and appealed for his release. This was successful as Erich Mielke personally had Robert released, but he was expelled from the party and lost his job.

In 1950, Dahlem had already attracted the attention of the Central Party Control Commission (ZPKK) in the context of the Paul Merker affair. Merker was another popular figure in the upper echelons of the party who had posed a threat to Ulbricht's power base. The ZPKK had shown a particular interest Dahlem's contacts with the (by now increasingly mistrusted) Soviet spy Noel Field, whom Dahlem had helped to obtain a Czechoslovak residency permit back in 1949. In December 1952, Dahlem received a powerful rebuke from the party for kaderpolitischer Fehler, a term loosely meaning "cadre political errors". A renewal of party interest in Noel Field may have been triggered by the show trial of Rudolf Slánský in Prague at the end of 1952. On 15 May 1953, the SED Central Committee stripped Dahlem of all his functions, citing "political blindness in respect of the activities of imperialist agents" (wegen politischer Blindheit gegenüber der Tätigkeit imperialistischer Agenten) which seems to have been another reference to Noel Field. There was fevered talk of a Zionist conspiracy and Ulbricht pressed Moscow to give the go ahead to set up a show trial for Dahlem along with one for Merker. Dahlem refused to co-operate in a process of self-criticism, and accordingly the ZPKK dug back into his past in some detail. Hermann Matern, the head of the commission, was critical above all of the attitude Dahlem had displayed in Paris back in 1939, which seems to be a reference to his offer to the French government of military support on behalf of the German communists in French exile. His wife spoke up in his defence, in June 1953 accusing Matern of lying. In the end, Dahlem was spared a show trial, which one source attributes to the lessening of political savagery sometimes characterised as the Khrushchev Thaw. Ulbricht nevertheless had his way in respect of Merker whose show trial took place on 29/30 March 1955 and ended with the pronouncement of an eight-year prison sentence.

Dahlem's return to grace began in 1955, though he was never again powerful enough to be seen as a threat to Ulbricht. He was given a junior post in the department for higher education, and a couple of years later he was promoted to the rank of a junior minister in the department. His formal rehabilitation took place in July 1956. In January 1957, he was co-opted back into the Central Committee, and also became a member of the influential National Research Council. Merker was also released and rehabilitated in 1957. From 1964, he was also president of the German-French Society of the GDR and a member of the executive committee of the Committee of Antifascist Resistance Fighters.

== Later career ==
Under the new 1968 Constitution of East Germany, power was resided unambiguously with the SED, and the Volksammer served as little more than a rubber stamp for the Central Committee. The stark inferiority of the parliament was in some respects obscured because senior members of the Central Committee, including Dahlem, also sat as members of the Volkskammer. He formally handed in his mandate on 3 February 1954. He returned to the Volkskammer in 1963 and remained a member of it until 1976.

== Awards and honours (not necessarily the full list) ==
- 1956 Hans Beimler Medal
- 1962 Artur Becker medal
- 1962 Order of Karl Marx
- 1964 Patriotic Order of Merit in gold
- 1965 Merit medal of the National People's Army
- 1967 Patriotic Order of Merit gold clasp
- 1970 Star of People's Friendship
- 1970 Honorary citizenship of Ivry-sur-Seine (jointly with his wife)
- 1972 Merit medal of the National People's Army
- 1977 Grand Star of People's Friendship
