= Hermann Remmele =

German politician (1880–1939)

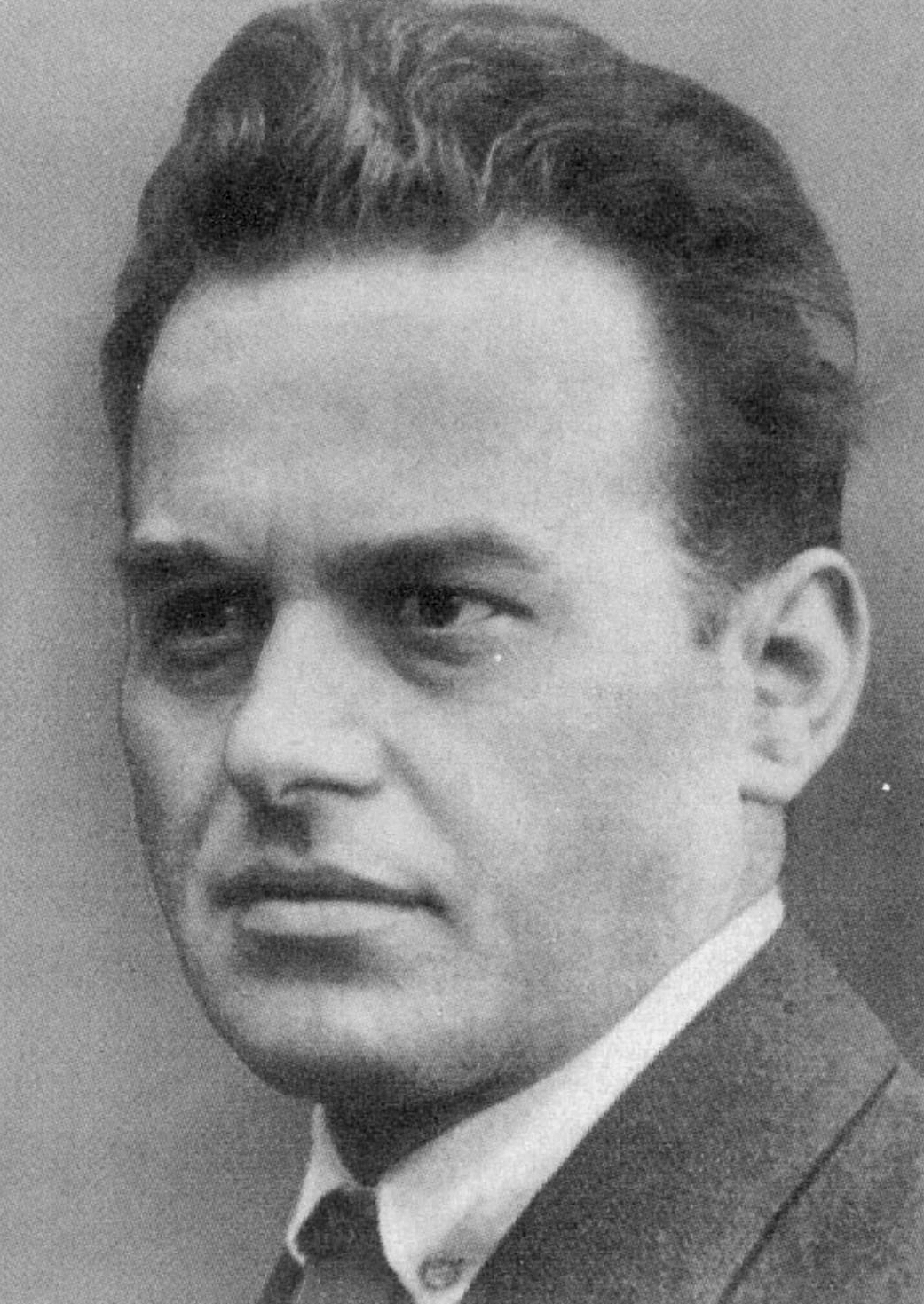
- Remmele c. 1924

Member of the Reichstag for Potsdam I
- In office 24 June 1920 – 28 February 1933
- Preceded by: Constituency established
- Succeeded by: Constituency abolished

Personal details
- Born: November 15, 1880 Ziegelhausen, Grand Duchy of Baden, German Empire
- Died: March 7, 1939 (aged 58) Moscow, Soviet Union
- Party: SPD (1897–1917); USPD (1917–1920); KPD (after 1920)
- Spouse: Anna Lauer
- Children: Helmut; Hedwig

Military service
- Allegiance: German Empire
- Branch/service: Imperial German Army
- Years of service: 1914–1917
- Battles/wars: World War I
- Central institution membership: 1924–1933: Full member, KPD Politburo; 1920–1933: Full member, KPD Central Committee (Note: Zentrale until 1925)

Hermann Remmele (15 November 1880 – 7 March 1939) was a German communist politician of the SPD, USPD and KPD. During exile in Moscow he carried the code name Herzen (English: "Hearts").

== Biography ==
=== Early years ===
Born in Ziegelhausen near Heidelberg, Hermann Remmele was the son of a miller. His brother, Adam Remmele, would go on to become the president of Baden. Remmele attended elementary school in Ludwigshafen and then trained as an iron turner. After a period as a wandering journeyman, he worked until the start of the First World War in 1914 in the profession for which he had trained.

In 1897, Remmele became a member of the SPD, as well as the German Metal Workers' Union. In the years 1901 to 1914 he was an honorary representative and board member of the union's Mannheim, Darmstadt and Offenbach am Main branches. Remmele also became involved in leading the association of young workers in Mannheim and attended the SPD's Central Party School in Berlin in 1907/08. At the same time, he wrote for several social democratic publications.

=== 1914 to 1932 ===
From 1914 Remmele served in the First World War. In 1917, he co-founded the USPD. During the November Revolution he was a member of the Workers' and Soldiers' Council in Mannheim, and was one of the co-initiators of the Soviet Republic in Mannheim (1919). That same year he was USPD District Secretary for the Republic of Baden and the Palatinate. He held the same position in Württemberg until the end of 1920.

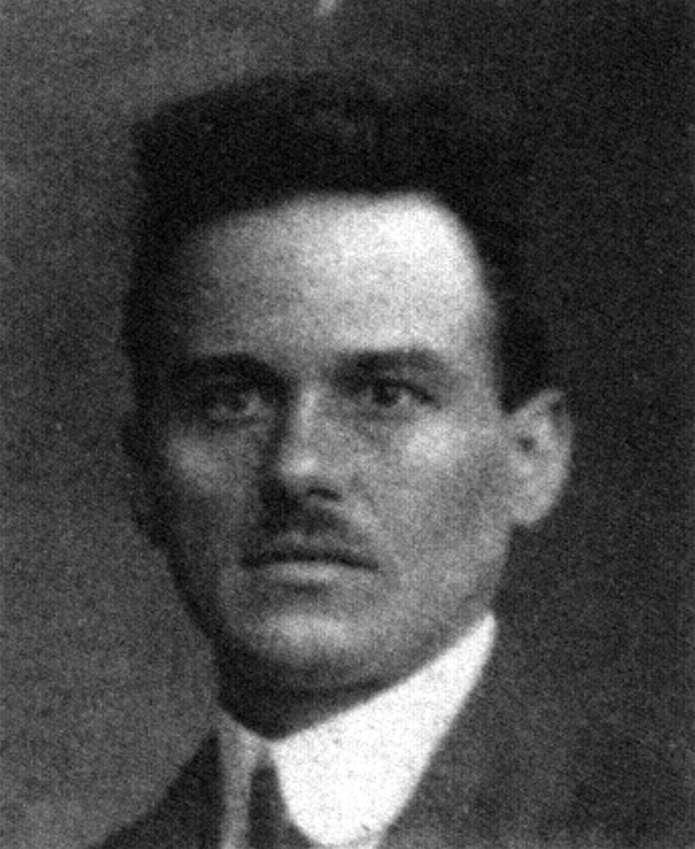
Remmele's official Reichstag portrait, 1920

Together with a faction of the party, Remmele joined the KPD in 1920, where he was a member of the Central Committee between 1920 and 1933, while being a member of the Reichstag during the same period. He briefly became KPD chairman in 1924. From 1923 to 1926 he also served as editor of the party newspaper, Die Rote Fahne. Remmele became Member of the Executive Committee of the Comintern (ECCI) from 1926 onwards.

In a 1923 speech to a mixed audience of both Communist and Nazi party members, Remmele condemned Nazi antisemitism. However, upon protests from the public, he took a more ambiguous stance, appeasing antisemitic elements in the crowd by stating: "One merely needs to go down to the Stuttgart cattle market in order to see how the cattle dealers, most of whom belong to Jewry, buy up cattle at any price". In another public debate during the same year, Remmele said he was more willing to cooperate with the Nazi Party than with the SPD (which was a breach of official Communist Party policy). In October 1923, Remmele stated during a speech that the Communist Party was contemplating armed revolution, thereby foreshadowing the Hamburg Uprising.

In 1925, he led a Communist Party delegation on a visit to the Soviet Union, about which he published the influential pro-Soviet leaflet Was sahen 58 deutsche Arbeiter in Russland? ("What did 58 German workers see in Russia?") as well as an extensive 1932 book.

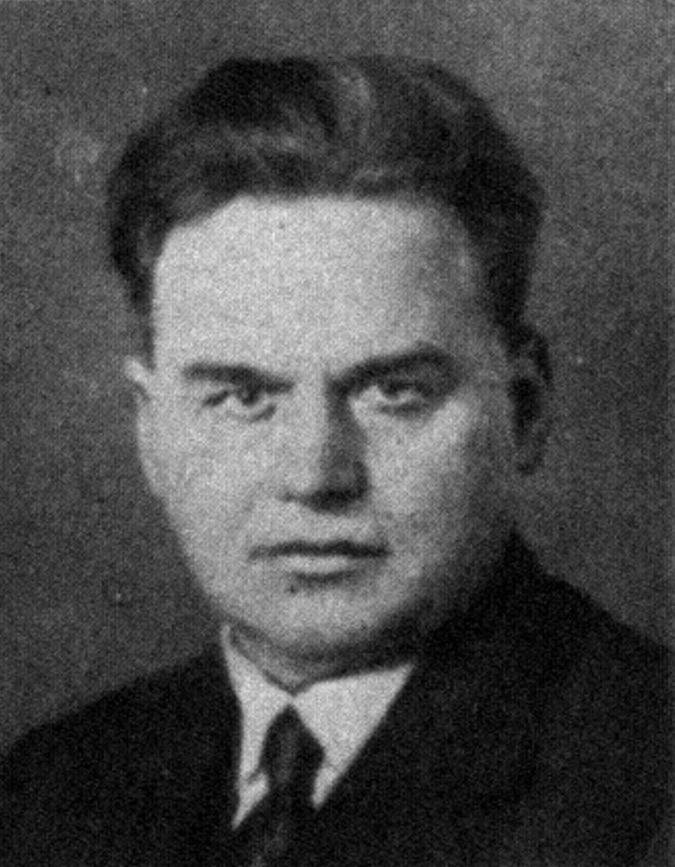
Remmele's official Reichstag portrait, 1930

From 1930 he was chairman of the Kampfbund gegen den Faschismus (de).

Of the 16 members that made up the Communist Party committee in 1924, only Remmele and Ernst Thälmann remained in 1929.

=== Exile in Moscow ===
After he, along with Heinz Neumann, lost a factional conflict within the KPD, Remmele relinquished his position in the party's Secretariat of the Central Committee in October 1932. This was followed in November 1933 by his exclusion from the Central Committee and the Politburo, and he was forced to resign from his functions in the ECCI. He subsequently left Germany for Moscow.

Following the Nazi seizure of power, his German citizenship was revoked (based on the 1933 Law on the Revocation of Naturalization and the Withdrawal of German Nationality) in March 1934.

=== Death ===
Remmele, his wife and their son Helmut were arrested in May 1937 during the Great Purge. Helmut was either shot immediately after his condemnation in January 1938 or died on his way to the Gulag. On 7 March 1939, Hermann Remmele was sentenced to death and shot the same day at Donskoy Cemetery in Moscow. A Soviet court rehabilitated him in 1988.

== Personal life ==
Remmele was married to Anna Lauer (1888–1947). They had two children, Helmut Remmele (1910–1938) and Hedwig Remmele (1907–1984).
