= List of people with surname Daniel =

Daniel is a common surname derived from the given name Daniel.

Notable people with the surname Daniel include:

- Adam Daniel, American actor
- Allen Daniel Jr. (1772–1836), American military officer and politician
- Angelo Daniel (born 1933), Italian Roman Catholic bishop
- Antoine Daniel (1601–1648), French Jesuit missionary
- Arnaut Daniel, Provençal troubadour of the 13th century
- Audrie Kiko Daniel, Zainichi Korean American model, actress, singer and designer
- Augustus Daniel, former Director of the National Gallery in London
- Berta Daniel, German photographer and political activist.
- Beth Daniel, professional golfer
- Bill Daniel (filmmaker), American filmmaker
- Bill Daniel (politician), governor of Guam and Democratic member of the Texas House of Representatives
- Britt Daniel, lead singer of the rock band Spoon
- Brittany Daniel, American actress, twin sister of Cynthia Daniel
- Caroline Daniel, panelist for The McLaughlin Group
- Catherine Daniel, Dominican politician
- Celso Daniel, former mayor of Santo André, São Paulo
- Charles E. Daniel, U.S. Senator from South Carolina
- Chase Daniel, National Football League quarterback
- Christian Daniel, Puerto Rican singer-songwriter
- Cindy Daniel, French Canadian singer of Italian, Irish and Indian origin
- Clifton Daniel, managing editor of The New York Times; husband of Margaret Truman
- Clifton Daniel, bishop in the Episcopal Church
- Clifton Truman Daniel, author and oldest grandson of former United States President Harry S. Truman
- Cynthia Daniel, American photographer, twin sister of Brittany Daniel
- Dan Daniel (sportswriter) (born Daniel Margowitz), American sportswriter
- David Daniel (disambiguation), multiple people
- Debra Daniel (born 1991), Micronesian swimmer
- Dor Daniel (born 1982), Israeli singer and songwriter
- Ed Daniel, American basketball player
- Edna Cain Daniel, American journalist and publisher
- Elijah Daniel, American comedian, rapper, and author
- Elnora D. Daniel (1941–2024), American nurse and academic administrator
- Elton L. Daniel, historian and Iranologist
- Frank Daniel, Czech-born film director, producer and screenwriter
- Gabriel Daniel, French Jesuit historian
- Gbenga Daniel, governor of Ogun State in Nigeria
- George Francis Daniel (born 1933), South African Roman Catholic archbishop
- Glyn Daniel, British archaeologist
- Gordon Daniel, sound editor
- Hannah Daniel (born 1986), Welsh actress
- Hector Daniel (1898–1953), South African military commander
- Hugh Daniel (1962–2013), American computer engineer
- Indileni Daniel, Namibian politician
- Izzy Daniel, American ice hockey player
- J. C. Daniel (naturalist) (1927–2011), Indian naturalist
- Jack Daniel, founder of Jack Daniel's whiskey
- James Simpson-Daniel, English rugby union footballer
- Jeffrey Daniel, American dancer and singer, notably of the group Shalamar
- Jennifer Daniel, British actress
- Joe Daniel (1954–2025), Canadian politician
- John Daniel (disambiguation), multiple people
- Junius Daniel, American planter and career military officer
- Laura Daniel, New Zealand actress and comedian
- Lorenzo Daniel, American track and field sprinter
- Lucien Louis Daniel (1856–1940), French botanist
- Marcela Daniel, Panamanian sprinter
- Marcos Daniel, Brazilian tennis player
- Mark Daniel (1900–1940), Soviet Jewish Yiddish writer and playwright
- Moti Daniel (born 1963), Israeli basketball player
- Oliver Daniel, American arts administrator, musicologist, and composer
- Paul Daniel, English conductor
- Peter V. Daniel, American jurist
- Price Daniel, U.S. Senator from Texas
- Ray Daniel (1928–1997), Welsh football player and manager
- Ray Daniel (born 1962), author of Boston-based crime fiction
- Ray Daniel (born 1964), English football player
- Robert Daniel, U.S. Representative from Virginia
- Robert Mackenzie Daniel (1813–1847), Scottish novelist
- Rod Daniel (1942–2016), American television and film director
- Samuel Daniel (1562–1619), English poet, playwright, and historian
- Sean Daniel (born 1989), Israeli basketball player
- Susan Daniel (chemical engineer), American chemical engineer
- Taro Daniel, American-born Japanese tennis player
- Terry Daniel, American football player
- Tim Daniel, American football player
- Tony Daniel, American comic book artist
- Trevor Daniel (American football), American football player
- Wallace L. Daniel, American historian
- Wayne Daniel, cricketer
- Wendy Palmer-Daniel, professional basketball player
- W. Harrison Daniel (1922–2013), American writer
- Wiley Young Daniel (1946–2019), American judge
- William Daniel (disambiguation), multiple people
- Yuli Daniel, Soviet dissident writer
- Zoe Daniel, Australian journalist

== See also ==
- Attorney General Daniel (disambiguation)
- General Daniel (disambiguation)
- Judge Daniel (disambiguation)
- Justice Daniel (disambiguation)
- Senator Daniel (disambiguation)
- List of people named Daniel, for people with the given name
