= Erich Wollenberg =

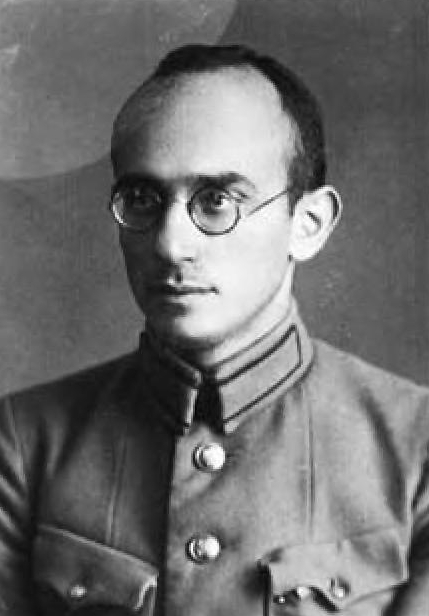
- Wollenberg in 1924

Personal details
- Born: 15 August 1892 Königsberg, East Prussia, Kingdom of Prussia, German Empire
- Died: 6 November 1973 (aged 81) Munich, Bavaria, West Germany
- Party: USPD (1918–1919); KPD (1919–1933)
- Occupation: Soldier; Revolutionary; Journalist

Military service
- Allegiance: German Empire; Munich Soviet; Soviet Union
- Branch/service: Imperial German Army; Bavarian Red Army; Red Army
- Years of service: 1914–1918; 1919; 1924–1926
- Rank: Leutnant; Deputy Commander-In-Chief; Kombat
- Commands: Red Army Group Dachau
- Battles/wars: World War I (WIA); German Revolution; Battle of Dachau
- Other offices held: 1923: Organizational Leader, Ruhr KPD

Erich Wollenberg (15 August 1892 – 6 November 1973; pseudonyms: Walter, Eugen Hardt, Martin Hart) was a German communist revolutionary and journalist who commanded military forces for the Bavarian Soviet Republic in 1919. He was a leading member of the Communist Party of Germany (KPD) until his expulsion in 1933, and in later years was an independent publicist.

== Life ==
=== World War and Revolution ===
Wollenberg was born into a family of doctors and studied medicine in Munich. During the First World War he served as a volunteer. He was decorated with medals, promoted to lieutenant in the reserve (infantry) in 1917 and wounded five times.

In 1918 he joined the USPD and the Spartacus League. He played a leading role in the November Revolution in Königsberg. He then returned to Munich to continue his studies in medicine. In the communist Second Bavarian Soviet Republic Wollenberg was from 19 April 1919. Commander of the Infantry and Deputy Commander-in-Chief of the Bavarian Red Army (Dachau). He wrote about the events in his 1929 report, Als Rotarmist vor München (A Red Guard before Munich). In this report Wollenberg was highly critical of his immediate superior, the poet Ernst Toller, accusing him of failing to press home the Red Army's advantage after early victories on the Dachau front. He wrote: "Only when Toller and comrades recognized that the civil war would not be decided with paper resolutions and ardent appeals, but only with cannons and machine guns, tanks and gas weapons, and only when the 'enormity' of a bloody confrontation with the enemy got closer, only then did all of their offensive plans collapse, and the only thing left was the 'pacifist weapon of the petty bourgeois': capitulation." After the fall of the Soviet Republic he was sentenced to two years Festungshaft ('fortress confinement') which he served in Landsberg, Ansbach und Niederschönenfeld, being released in January 1922.

=== German October and Exile in Moscow ===
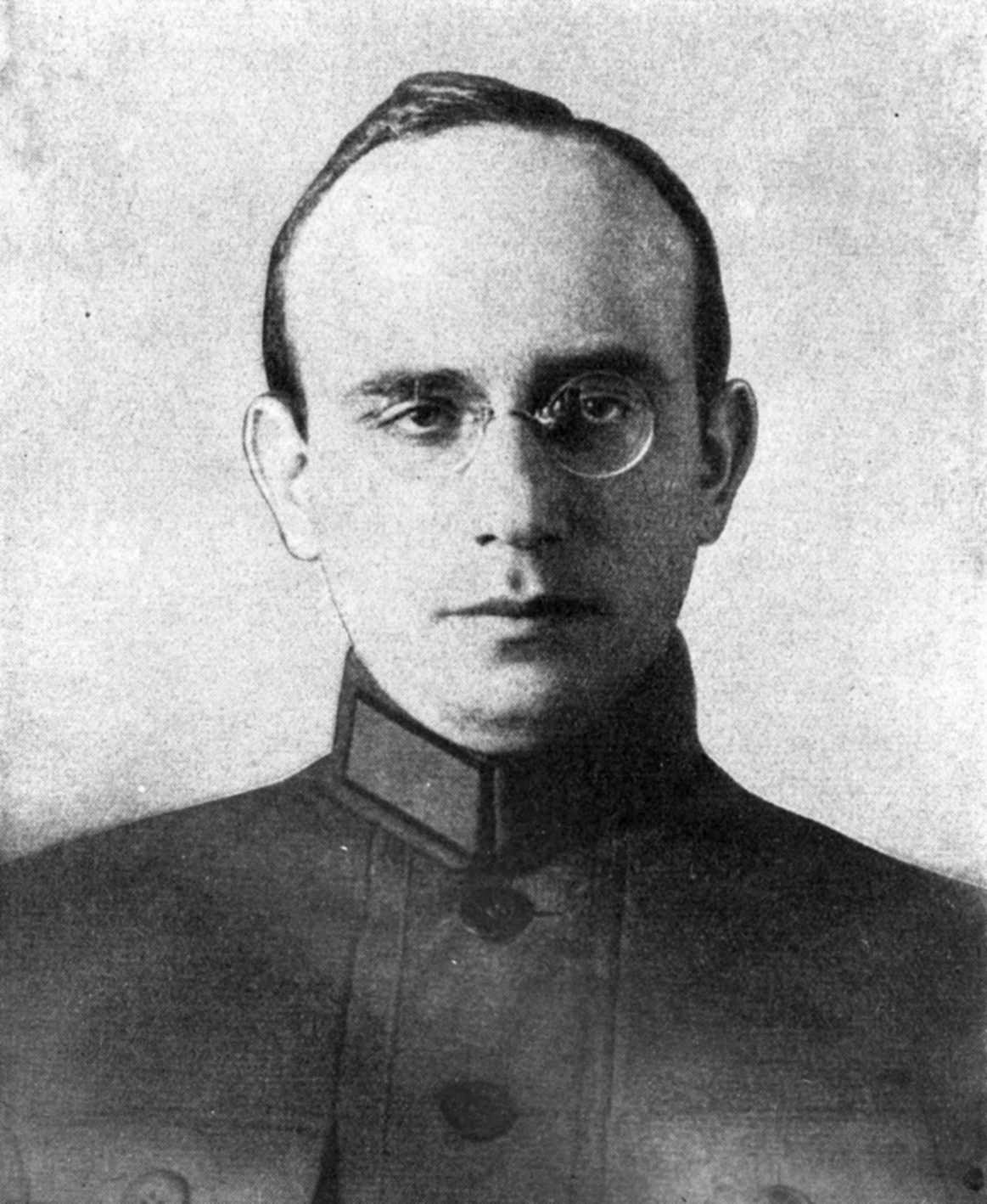
Wollenberg c. 1929

In March 1922 Wollenberg became chief editor of the eastern edition of Die Rote Fahne. He was also active in the KPD's intelligence service, the Antimilitärischer Apparat, establishing communist cells within the Reichswehr. In May 1923 he was initially leader of the armed communist uprising attempt during the occupation of the Ruhr in Bochum, as local secretary of the KPD Ruhr area. In August 1923 he was the KPD's military chief South-West (Württemberg, Baden, Hesse, temporarily Bavaria).

Following the collapse of the German October Wollenberg, now wanted on a warrant, fled in 1924 to the Soviet Union, where he served from 1924 to 1926 as an officer in the Red Army, battalion commander in Saratov among the Volga Germans, then in Moscow. In 1927 he was briefly and illegally in Germany as Chief Editor of the “Arbeiter Zeitung” in Saarbrücken. Returning to Moscow, he became a scientific assistant in the Marx–Engels–Lenin Institute. From 1928 Wollenberg was Professor of History of the International Workers‘ Movement in the International Lenin School.

=== Amnesty and Party Struggles ===
Following the amnesty of autumn 1930 Wollenberg was able to return to Germany. In 1931 he joined the leadership of the illegal Roter Kämpferbund (the paramilitary Red Front) and Editor-in-Chief of its magazine Die Rote Front.

After being seriously injured by the SA, Wollenberg criticized the KPD leadership for not providing him with adequate protection. His criticism was also directed at Walter Ulbricht. Together with Herbert Wehner, Ulbricht initiated an internal party investigation against Wollenberg, who received a “party reprimand” and lost his post in the editorial office of Die Rote Fahne. At the instigation of Wilhelm Pieck, Wollenberg emigrated to the Soviet Union at the end of 1932. Wollenberg later referred to it as being "transferred to Moscow as a punishment".

=== Alleged Wollenberg-Hoelz Conspiracy ===
In Moscow he collaborated on the publication of Lenin's works in German. There he came under the scrutiny of the NKVD, also because he had contact with the Trotskyist Karl Retzlaw. The secret service constructed around Wollenberg and Max Hoelz the accusation of a “counter-revolutionary, Trotskyist-terrorist conspiracy” (the “Wollenberg-Hoelz conspiracy”). Wollenberg was expelled from the KPD on April 4, 1933 by the International Control Commission of the Comintern. Pursued equally by Stalin and the Nazis, Wollenberg managed to escape from Moscow in 1934 via Prague to Paris (1938). In the Soviet Union, Wollenberg was now considered a “Trotskyist” enemy of the state. Many of his acquaintances and political friends were persecuted and murdered.

=== Exile in Western Europe and Casablanca ===
In Paris, Wollenberg joined the anti-fascist resistance and was in contact with intelligence services. After the start of World War II, he was interned as an enemy alien. With the help of French officers, he fled in May 1940 from Le Vernet near Paris to Casablanca in what was later Vichy loyal Morocco . His extradition to the Gestapo could be prevented, although it was not possible to obtain transit visas to flee to the USA, despite the support of Walter Fabian and his wife. This situation faced by refugees in Morocco formed the basis for the film Casablanca, 1942, though it cannot be established whether Wollenberg directly provided any inspiration. Although the police arrested Wollenberg in Casablanca in April 1941, he had not been extradited to Germany by the time of the landing by the Allies in November 1942.

=== After the War ===
After the defeat of Nazi Germany, Wollenberg first went to Paris in 1946, then to Germany with American support. He became a full-time journalist from the 1950s. From 1960 he was head of the foreign policy editorial department of the magazine Echo der Woche in Munich, leaving after serious conflicts. He then worked as a freelance journalist and publicists, collaborating with other left-wing critics of Stalinism such as Franz Borkenau and Margarete Buber-Neumann and emigrants from Eastern Europe. As an expert and informant about the situation in Eastern Europe, he worked for the eastern bureaus of the German Trade Union Confederation and the SPD and from the end of 1951 for the Gehlen Organization and the Federal Intelligence Service. In the Algerian War Wollenberg advised Ahmed Ben Bella. From 1964 he lived in Hamburg. He died on 6 November 1973 in Munich.

He was a distant relative of the German historian Jörg Wollenberg.

== Sources ==
- Wollenberg, E, A Red Guard before Munich: Reportage from the Bavarian Soviet Republic, translated and edited by Ed Walker 2021 ISBN 9798510675221
- Walker E. (ed) The German Robin Hood. Soldier, revolutionary and political prisoner: The extraordinary life of Max Hoelz 2019 ISBN 9781797714189
- (A. Neuberg), Hans Kippenberger, M. N. Tuchatschewski, Ho Chi Minh: Der bewaffnete Aufstand, Versuch einer theoretischen Darstellung, Eingeleitet von Erich Wollenberg. Frankfurt am Main, 1971: Europäische Verlagsanstalt
- Bernd Kramer, Christoph Ludszuweit, Hrsg.: Der Feuerstuhl und die Fährtensucher. Rolf Recknagel, Anna Seghers, Erich Wollenberg auf den Spuren B. Travens. Karin Kramer Verlag Berlin, 2002 ISBN 3-87956-266-0
- Reinhard Müller: Menschenfalle Moskau. Exil und stalinistischer Terror. Hamburger Edition 2001 ISBN 3-930908-71-9
- Heinrich August Winkler: Der Schein der Normalität. Arbeiter und Arbeiterbewegung in der Weimarer Republik 1924 bis 1930. Berlin, Bonn, 1985 ISBN 3-8012-0094-9, S. 881
- Michael Kubina: Von Utopie, Widerstand und kaltem Krieg: Das unzeitgemässe Leben des Berliner Rätekommunisten Alfred Weiland (1906-1978). Berlin-Hamburg-Münster, 2001 S. 379 Digitalisat
- Sven Schneider: Widerstand oppositioneller Kommunisten. Erich Wollenberg – verfolgt von Hitler und Stalin. In: Hans Coppi, Stefan Heinz (Hrsg.): Der vergessene Widerstand der Arbeiter. Gewerkschafter, Kommunisten, Sozialdemokraten, Trotzkisten, Anarchisten und Zwangsarbeiter, Dietz, Berlin, 2012, ISBN 978-3320022648, S. 199–228.
- Wollenberg, Erich. In: Hermann Weber, Andreas Herbst: Deutsche Kommunisten. Biographisches Handbuch 1918 bis 1945. 2., überarbeitete und stark erweiterte Auflage. Dietz, Berlin 2008, ISBN 978-3-320-02130-6.
