= Gertrud Classen =

German resistance activist during the Nazi years

- Born: 3 July 1905; Königsberg, East Prussia, Germany
- Died: 3 September 1974 (aged 69); Berlin, East Germany
- Occupations: Political activist intelligence courier sculptor
- Political party: KPD; SED

Gertrud Classen (3 July 1905 – 3 September 1974) was a German resistance activist during the Nazi years.

Her training was as an artist, and after the war she was able to make a career as a sculptor in the German Democratic Republic, despite being frequently hospitalised during the later 1940s by the osseous tuberculosis from which she suffered.

== Life ==
Gertrud "Tutta" Classen was born in Königsberg, the capital of East Prussia which at that time was part of Germany. Her father was a farm manager. She grew up in nearby Elbing, where she received her first painting and drawing lessons from Paul Emil Gabel. After a successful school career she entered the Königsberg Arts Academy. Classen had been politically engaged since her school years, and in 1930 she moved to Berlin, switching to the "Berlin Academy for Graphic Arts and Sculpture" ("Berliner Akademie für Grafik und Steinbildhauerei").

In 1919, the year of her fourteenth birthday, she joined the Wandervogel girls' youth organisation, within which between 1924 and 1926 she was a group leader. In 1928 the Wandervogel merged with other hitherto independent youth associations to form the Deutsche Freischar. Classen quit the organisation and joined the more overtly political "Lenin Youth League" ("Leninjugend") as well as the youth wing of the Communist Party of Germany. 1929 was also the year in which she joined the Communist party itself, but she initially kept this membership secret or, according to the term used by one source, "unofficial".

During the 1930s she worked for the KPD's Antimilitärischer Apparat ("Anti-Military Apparatus"), which was in reality an operation involved in intelligence on behalf of the Soviet Union. It was led by Hans Kippenberger. Kippenberger and Leo Roth, who is sometimes described as Kippenberger's "secretary", both acted as guarantors for her within the party. She was also working, at this time, for the Red Aid organisation, the Revolutionary Trades Unionist Opposition (Revolutionäre Gewerkschafts Opposition / RGO), and other left-wing groups such as the Association of Revolutionary Visual Artists ("Bund Revolutionärer Bildender Künstler Deutschlands / BRBKD). The political landscape changed dramatically in January 1933 when the Nazis took power and converted Germany into a one- party dictatorship. Gertrud Classen's political activities were now expressly illegal. The RGO was banned, went underground and was finally crushed in 1935.

It is known that after the Nazis came to power Classen was involved in illegal leaflet distribution. Sources are a little vague on her work for the Communist Party News Agency. In July 1934 she traveled to London and Paris with the left-wing landscape architect Walter Rossow, delivering secret information on behalf of the Agency. She may have made such journeys to England or France on more than one occasion. Even before the Nazis had taken power, in September 1932, Classen had been arrested and briefly detained in connection with communist activism during the chaotic run-up to that year's second General Election. Towards the end of 1934 she was again arrested and imprisoned by the authorities. However, she was released on account of her osseous tuberculosis, and went immediately to Switzerland, returning to Berlin only in the summer of 1939. By this time the Communist Party News Agency ("Nachrichtendienst") had ceased to function, not because of anything done by the German government, but on account of Stalin's paranoia. The agency chief, Hans Kippenberger, was arrested in Moscow in November 1936, identified as a foreign agent, subjected to a secret trial and shot on 3 October 1937. His deputy, Leo Roth, met his end under similar circumstances just over a month later.

War returned in the late summer of 1939 and Classen was briefly arrested in 1940. This turned out to be the first of several periods of detention during the war years. After this she worked clandestinely with the Schulze-Boysen/Harnack resistance group. She also secretly housed the resistance fighter Ilse Stillmann and the deserter/resistance fighter (and talented document forger) Oskar Huth. After the failure of the plot of July 1944 to assassinate the nation's leader, Gertrud Classen was able to provide forged papers for Ludwig von Hammerstein (who had been involved in the plot) and to help him disappear, which he did successfully till after the war was over. In Autumn 1944 she was also involved in producing forged food stamps which meant that Ilse Stillmann was not merely kept hidden from the authorities, but fed.

War ended in May 1945, and a large region surrounding Berlin found itself administered as the Soviet occupation zone. Within the zone, partly in order to avoid a split on the political left opening a chasm through which right-wing extremists might again take power, and partly (as matters turned out) to prepare for a new one- party dictatorship after 1949, the principal left wing parties merged in April 1946. Gertrud Classen was one of thousands of Communist Party members who immediately signed their party membership across to the new Socialist Unity Party (Sozialistische Einheitspartei Deutschlands / SED). However, for Classen the next few years were dominated not by political engagement but by lengthy stays in hospital, caused by her tuberculosis.

Between 1950 and 1953, she attended the Arts Academy in Berlin as a "Meisterschülerin" (loosely: "Master student"). Through the 1950s, and on till 1965, she worked as a freelance sculptor in the German Democratic Republic.

Towards the end of her life she gathered material to write a history of women's youth movements because she saw the absence of such a history as a gaping hole in the historical record. The book never appeared. Gertrud Classen died in East Berlin on 3 September 1974.

== Awards and honours ==
- 1960 Patriotic Order of Merit in silver
