= Rudolf Schwarz (resistance activist) =

German contributing editor

- Born: 3 March 1904; Berlin, Germany
- Died: 1 February 1934 (aged 29); Berlin, Germany
- Occupations: Political activist Party worker Political journalist Party intelligence officer Anti-government activist
- Political party: KPD
- Parent(s): Arthur Abraham Schwarz; 1861-1915; Regina Schwarz (born Japha Brasch); 1867-1921

Rudolf (Rudi) Schwarz (3 March 1904 – 1 February 1934) was a German Communist Party activist who after 1933 became an anti-government activist. He was arrested, detained and then, a few weeks short of his thirtieth birthday, handed over to the Gestapo who shot him at the beginning of February 1934.

In the German Democratic Republic he came to wider public attention when the popular author Stephan Hermlin included his story in a 1951 book about resistance to Nazism. After this Schwarz became something of an iconic figure, featured in cinema and television productions.

== Life ==
Rudolf "Rudi" Schwarz was born into a working-class family in Berlin. Abraham Schwarz, his father who came originally from Kosten near Posen, died in 1915. His mother, born Japha Brasch also came originally from eastern Germany: she died at a similarly young age in 1921. He completed an industrial apprenticeship and then, in 1921, joined the Young Communists ("Kommunistischer Jugendverband Deutschlands"). Soon after this he joined the recently launched Communist Party itself.

Through the 1920s Schwarz served the party in a number of capacities. From 1922 he led a party youth group in Prenzlauer Berg, a quarter on the north-east side that had grown up during the closing decades of the nineteenth century as the city's population had been massively boosted by immigration from the countryside and from the east more widely. He was also engaged in the unionisation of white collar workers through his involvement with Berlin's Zentralverband der Angestellten (ZdA). Between 1924 and 1928 Schwarz was a contributing editor to Junge Garde, a weekly publication which by this time had become a Young Communists publication. After 1927 he was also a leader for Berlin and Brandenburg of the "Rote Jungfront", the youth wing of the party's paramilitary operation.

In May 1929 the "Rote Jungfront" and its parent organisation were banned by the Prussian interior minister. The move appears to have been broadly effective in its own terms. Around the same time Schwarz accepted a job with the Party Central Committee, working for the newly appointed Central Committee member Hans Kippenberger. His principal duties involved working for what shortly afterwards became known as the Antimilitärischer Apparat ("AM"), a shadowy organisation with an intentionally misleading name, which was part of the party's paramilitary section. The "AM" is sometimes described as the intelligence service of the German Communist Party during this period. Schwarz's particular area of responsibility involved targeting members of the National Defence Force ("Reichswehr") (Note: Under the terms imposed at Versailles Germany's entitlement to a national army of its own had been severely circumscribed by treaty since 1919.) and of the Police Service. It was no doubt, in part, a reflection of the sensitivities involved that Schwarz's "AM" activities very soon triggered a response from the security services. In July 1930 he was sentenced to eight months imprisonment. He served out his sentence as a prisoner in the old fortress at Gollnow. During his time at Gollnow Schwarz was involved in long political discussions with the army officer Richard Scheringer. Scheringer had also received his prison sentence for political activism: Scheringer had been convicted of attempting to form National Socialist ("Nazi") cells inside the National Defence Force (Note: "Versuchs einer nationalsozialistischen Zellenbildung innerhalb der Reichswehr".) In March 1931 Richard Scheringer, somewhat unusually, switched his political allegiance, renouncing the National Socialists and becoming an active communist. Rudolf Schwarz later became widely credited with playing a crucial part in Scheringer's startling political conversion. Following his release during 1931, Schwarz resumed his work with Hans Kippenberger, again becoming closely involved with the party's "Antimilitaristischer Apparat".

In January 1933 the Hitler government took power and lost little time in transforming Germany into a one-party dictatorship. Opinions differ over precisely when, formally, membership of or activity on behalf of the Communist Party became illegal, but from the end of February 1933 known communists headed the lists of those marked out for government persecution. Rudolf Schwarz, working in close partnership with party president John Schehr, sustained his active participation in the banned party's "military-political apparatus", becoming leader of that operation, according to at least one source, during the middle part of 1933. By now he was, of necessity, living and operating "underground", using the party name "Horst". It was "Horst" who signed off the final report on the arrest, back in March 1933 of the party's then leader, Ernst Thälmann. (Note: Ernst Thälmann remained in prison for more than eleven years. He was executed in August 1944, half a week before the launch of Aktion Gitter.)

Inevitably Schwarz became a high priority target for the security services. It is known that he was still at liberty on 25 December 1933. On that date he met with Leo Roth, Siegfried Rädel, Herbert Wehner and Wilhelm Kox. The men, between them, comprised the available members of the underground party leadership for the region. Their objective was to arrange for a rapid reconfiguration of Kippenberger's party intelligence structure. Kippenberger had probably, by this time, fled abroad, as had most of the other leading party figures, apart from those who had already been arrested during 1933. Sources differ over whether it was at the end of December 1933 or during the first part of January 1934 that Rudolf Schwarz was himself captured by the authorities. He was taken to Columbia House which later came to be administered as part of the Concentration Camps Network, but which at this stage was being used as prison accommodation, staffed by Nazi paramilitaries from the SS and the SA. He was subjected to severe interrogation-torture.

A number of leading Berlin communists had been captured at around the same time. On 1 February 1934 John Schehr, Eugen Schönhaar, Erich Steinfurth and Rudolf Schwarz were shot dead at the Schäferberg / Kilometerberg (hill) on the edge of Berlin by Gestapo personnel, while being transported to Berlin-Wannsee, and allegedly "while attempting to escape". In reality the murder was an act of quick retribution following the shooting the previous day of the government spy Alfred Kattner. Rudolf Diels, the Gestapo chief in 1934, published a memoir after 1945 in which he recalled that The Leader had reacted to Kattner's killing by demanding that "a thousand hostages from among the communists under arrest" should be shot. According to Diels, responsibility for the shooting of "John Schehr and his comrades" was down to a police commissar called Bruno Sattler. And according to at least one source Sattler had himself fired some or all of the fatal shots.

== Posthumous celebrity ==
Stephan Hermlin's book "Die erste Reihe" (loosely, "The front rank") appeared in 1951. In it he related "the stories of resistance during the Nazi era, based on the life stories and fates of the young people who sacrificed their lives in the struggle against fascism." The book comprised 31 biographical summaries on Berliners who resisted. Stephan Hermlin was a thoughtful author and a formidable talent. He had moved in 1947 from the west to the Soviet occupation zone (after October 1949 the Soviet sponsored German Democratic Republic (East Germany)). Almost all of the resistance heroes featured in "Die erste Reihe" were communists: one of the 31 was Rudolf Schwarz. The volume was an unapologetic attempt to "create heroes". Subsequent historians have opined that in the case of the section on Rudolf Schwarz, there was much detailed information available which could have given a more complete and in many ways more impressive - but also more nuanced - view of Schwarz and his contributions to sustaining the communist agenda during the Nazi period. This was simply left out, apparently so as to give the narrative a succinct format and a positive resonance. Hermlin's contribution formed the basis for a film produced by the DEFA studio which found its way onto the East German television service in 1987. In it, the part of Rudolf Schwarz is taken by Ulrich Mühe.

In 1954 the physical remains of Rudolf Schwarz were located, exhumed, cremated and buried at the Memorial to the Socialists (German: Gedenkstätte der Sozialisten), the place of honour in the Friedrichsfelde Cemetery reserved by the East German government for the leaders and activists of Germany's socialist and communist history.
