= John Schehr =

German politician (1896–1934)

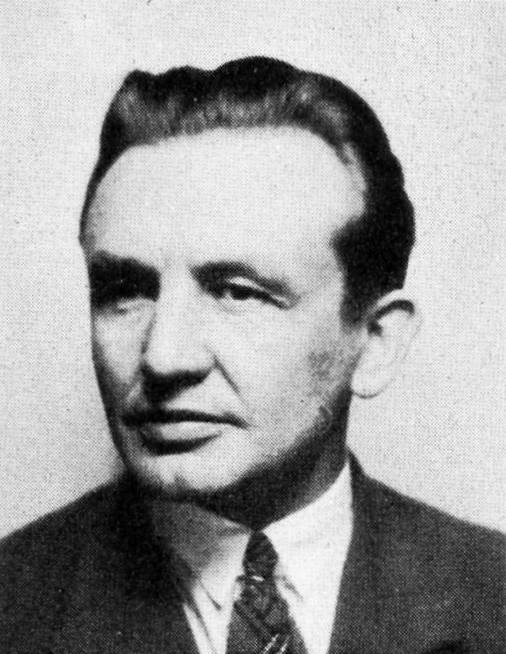
- Schehr c. 1932

Chairman of the Communist Party of Germany
- Acting (Note: Ernst Thälmann, who had been arrested by the Gestapo on 3 March 1933, remained de jure party leader until his execution on 18 August 1944; Schehr and later Pieck were acting chairmen as deputy leaders.); 3 March 1933 – 1 February 1934
- Preceded by: Ernst Thälmann
- Succeeded by: Wilhelm Pieck
Parliamentary constituencies
Member of the Reichstag for Reichswahlvorschlag
In office 30 August 1932 – 28 February 1933
Preceded by	Multi-member district
Succeeded by	Constituency abolished
Member of the Landtag of Prussia for South Hanover–Braunschweig
In office 25 May 1932 – 23 August 1932
Preceded by	Multi-member district
Succeeded by	August Tünnermann

Personal details
- Born: 9 February 1896 Altona-Ottensen, Province of Schleswig-Holstein, Kingdom of Prussia, German Empire (now Altona, Hamburg)
- Died: 1 February 1934 (aged 37) Schäferberg, Berlin-Wannsee, Free State of Prussia, Nazi Germany
- Party: SPD (1912–1917); USPD (1917–1919); KPD (1918–1934)
- Spouse: Anna
- Occupation: Politician; Trade Unionist; Machinist

Military service
- Allegiance: German Empire; Revolutionaries
- Branch/service: Imperial German Army
- Years of service: 1916–1918; 1923
- Rank: Unteroffizier
- Battles/wars: World War I; Western Front; Hamburg Uprising
- Central institution membership: 1933–1934: Full member, KPD Politburo; 1932–1934: Full member, KPD Central Committee; Other offices held: 1930–1932: Political Leader, Lower Saxony KPD; 1927–1928, 1929–1930: Organizational Leader, Wasserkante (Hamburg-Schleswig-Holstein) KPD

John Schehr (9 February 1896 – 1 February 1934) was a German political activist who became a Communist Party politician and ultimately, chairman (leader) of the Communist Party of Germany, following the arrest on 3 March 1933 of Ernst Thälmann. By this time the country was very rapidly being transformed into a one-party dictatorship, meaning that the party John Schehr led was outlawed, with those members of the leadership team who had not escaped abroad now living "underground" (unregistered) and in hiding. Schehr was nevertheless arrested on 13 November 1933 and taken to a Berlin concentration camp. He died when he was one of four men shot by Gestapo officials, reportedly "while escaping" during an overnight transport, following arrest.

After the end of the Nazi regime, Schehr and his three murdered comrades were widely commemorated as martyrs by the German Democratic Republic.

== Life ==
=== Provenance and early years ===
John "Jonny" Schehr was born into a working-class family in the Ottensen quarter of Altona, Hamburg, at that time a robustly independent municipality, but subsequently - in 1937 - subsumed into Hamburg. His father worked as a hairdresser. As a boy he was particularly close to his mother, born Martha Fischer. John Schehr's younger brother, Franz, later recalled that the family always read the Hamburger Echo and Wahre Jacob, both staunchly SPD newspapers. Schehr attended school locally in Ottensen and then completed an apprenticeship as a skilled metal worker with "Firma Meier" (Gerberstraße), an Altona manufacturing company. Towards the end of 1912, still aged only 16, joined the Social Democratic Party ("Sozialdemokratische Partei Deutschlands"/ SPD). The next year he also joined the Transport Workers' Union He was working during this period on the Hamburg docks, which is how he came to know Ernst Thälmann.

=== War years and the beginnings of the Communist Party ===
In 1916 or 1917 Schehr was conscripted into an artillery regiment and sent to serve at Neu Breisach, an important redoubt which at that time was part of Germany. Without intending it, he found himself promoted to the rank of a "sub-officer" ("Unteroffizier"). It is recorded that during one retreat he skilfully led his troops so that they avoided capture. His brother Walter Schehr was killed in action in 1916. The 1914 decision of the party leadership to vote in favour of war funding and forego criticism of the government for the duration of hostilities during the war had been contentious among party activists from the outset, and the SPD finally split over the issue of support for the war in 1917. John Schehr, like his mentor Ernst Thälmann, was one of a large number of mainly left-wing party members who moved across to the breakaway Independent Social Democratic Party (" Unabhängige Sozialdemokratische Partei Deutschlands" / USPD). After the war there was no immediate return to his skilled work, but the docks continued to function and he joined his brother Franz in work as a stevedore till 1924. In 1919 when, in its turn, the USPD), Thälmann and Schehr, were among the early recruits to the newly launched Communist Party in the wake of the so-called November revolutions. Almost all the USPD activists in the Hamburg district made the same move, which can be seen in large measure as a tribute to Ernst Thälmann's oratorical and political powers of persuasion. Schehr quickly became an energetic party activist: his brother recalled later that during the early 1920s he was out almost every evening, undertaking party work.

=== From party activist to party officer ===
1923 was a year of intensified destitution across Germany, and a number of major disturbances. In Hamburg Schehr took part in the storming the Ottensen police station, which was one of police stations in and around Hamburg attacked on 23 October in the context of that year's October uprising, carefully planned and choreographed by Ernst Thälmann on behalf of the party. In 1924 Schehr became a party "Polleiter" (loosely, "policy head") for Altona where he was already, by this time, a municipal councillor. He also regained his skilled work on the docks. The next year he accepted a fulltime job working within the party apparatus, however. It is clear that John Schehr's advancement in the national party over the next few years owed much to the friendship and political patronage of Ernst Thälmann, but he evidently had many friends and admirers among local party activists. A particular friend and political ally was Etkar André.

=== Party advancement ===
It was nevertheless more likely to have been as a result, primarily, of Thälmann's backing that in 1925, at the tenth party congress, John Schehr was elected to membership of the party appeal's commission ("Beschwerdekommissio"). The same congress also voted Schehr onto the list of candidates for the Party Central Committee. The dire economic situation during the early 1920s made this a period of expansion for the communists in the industrial regions, and during 1925 John Schehr was appointed to lead the party organisation in the recently established Harburg-Wilhelmsburg sub-district ("Unterbezirksleiter") in succession to Johann Skjellerup. The appointment was of short duration, however, since in March 1926 the fulltime paid position was abolished, possibly to save money and possibly in response to a decline in party membership locally. In 1927 he was appointed "Orgleiter" (loosely "Head of Administration") for the party's important Hamburg-Wasserkante district (to the west and north of Hamburg), thereby becoming a key member of the regional party executive under the leadership of regional party secretary John Wittorf.

=== Wittorf affair ===
Also in 1927 Schehr was again a delegate at the party's eleventh party congress, held that year in Essen. Again he was voted onto the list of candidates for the Party Central Committee. As a member of the Control Commission for the Hamburg-Wasserkante party organisation, Schehr was implicated in concealing the embezzlement of party funds by John Wittorf during the course of a scandal that blew up in 1928. Ernst Thälmann was, by some criteria, more heavily and directly implicated, and he was indeed briefly ousted from the party Central Committee, but Joseph Stalin, whose influence over the German party leadership was immense, intervened to have Thälmann reinstated. From now on Thälmann was seen by party comrades as "Stalin's man": it did his career no harm. There was no intervention with such immediate impact on behalf of John Schehr who was stripped of all his party functions in October 1928. There were even demands for Schehr to be excluded from the party, but that did not happen.

=== Political recovery and advancement ===
Following Ernst Thälmann's rehabilitation Schehr, as Thälmann's respected protégé, quickly recovered his position in the party. He was reinstated as party "Orgleiter" for the Hamburg-Wasserkante district, retaining the post till March 1930. In 1929, at the eleventh party congress (held in Berlin-Wedding) Schehr was again present as a delegate, and he was yet again included on the candidates list for Central Committee membership. An East German newspaper tribute which appeared in 1967 states that on this occasion he was elected to full membership of the party Central Committee, but other more plausible sources refute this. It is nevertheless clear that by this stage John Schehr was widely respected and liked by party comrades whereas his more formidable mentor, Ernst Thälmann, who had been party leader since 1925, is more usually seen as having been widely feared within the party by this point.

=== Crisis years ===
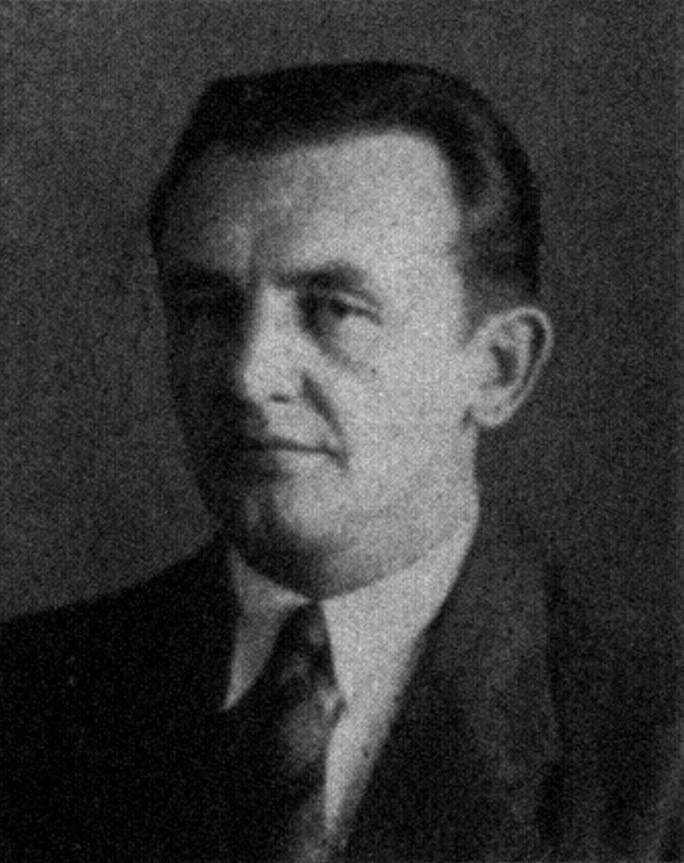
Schehr's official Reichstag portrait, 1932

In 1930 John Schehr took over the job of regional party secretary ("Polleiter") with the Hanover-based regional leadership team ("Bezirksleitung") for the Lower Saxony region in succession to Willi Bohn, whom the national party leadership had decided (at very short notice) should be sent to the International Lenin School in Moscow for two years of party training. His slow but steady progression through the party ranks meant that he was beginning to emerge from behind Thälmann's shadow. Meanwhile, a return to widespread economic austerity, as Germany worked through the savage backwash from the Great Depression, was creating a surge across Germany in support for the Communist Party. This was accompanied by increasing political polarisation leading, after 1932, to deadlock in the Reichstag (national parliament) whereby coalition with on or other of the two populist parties, the National Socialists and the Communists was mathematically necessary for the more moderate parties to coalesce to form a majority coalition, but both extremist parties were unacceptable coalition parties either for the moderate parties or form each other. It was in the resulting context of intensifying crisis that in April 1932 Schehr was elected a member of the Prussian Landtag (regional parliament), representing South Hanover–Braunschweig. Three months later, in July 1932, he was elected to the Reichstag. (His Landtag seat was taken over by his party comrade August Tünnermann.)

Within the party Schehr's career continued to advance. During the middle of 1932 he finally became a member of the party Central Committee. This came about not through any vote of delegates at a party congress, but as a result of being co-opted into membership by the existing members. He relocated to Berlin, becoming both secretary to the Central Committee and a member of its inner caucus, the Politburo. Schehr was now, in all but name, deputy to the party leader, Ernst Thälmann. His position in the party apparatus was further strengthened after Heinz Neumann was stripped of his party functions and then officially condemned by the leadership in November 1932 and sent as a Comintern emissary to Spain. (Neumann had clashed with Thälmann who he believed, along with Joseph Stalin, was dangerously underestimating the strength of the threat presented by Adolf Hitler.)

It was probably in October or November 1932 that the police arrested John Schehr and discovered "important material" concerning the party's illegal structures (which included a semi-secret quasi-military operation across the nation and a large "political" espionage network on a scale normally associated with foreign governments rather than with domestic political parties). The arrest was apparently made "because of an instruction from the Ministry of Defence". Although sources differ wildly over the month of Schehr's 1932 arrest, it is apparent that he was released after eight days in detention. Regardless of the legal basis for the arrest (which remains vague and unclear), as a member of the Reichstag (national parliament) till some months after the régime change in 1933, John Schehr enjoyed certain privileges, and it would appear to have been on account of these that on this occasion his release came so swiftly.

=== Régime change ===
The Hitler government exploited the continuing parliamentary and political deadlock to take power in January 1933. They lost no time in transforming Germany into a one-party dictatorship. Over the next few weeks the Communist party was outlawed and those of its leaders who had not already gone into hiding or emigrated were rounded up by the security services. On 7 February 1933 Schehr was one of the participants at the "illegal" Sporthaus Ziegenhals meeting held just outside Berlin, and celebrated subsequently (especially during the "East German" years) as the last meeting held by the German Communist Party leadership before the participants were arrested and killed, or in some cases managed to escape abroad.

On 3 March 1933 Ernst Thälmann was arrested as part of the wave of (apparently preplanned) political arrests that followed the Reichstag fire. It was the Comintern, presumably under instructions from Moscow, that transferred the party chairmanship to John Schehr, as Thälmann's de facto deputy. The chairmanship appointment meant that he became the official leader of the from now on "underground" Communist Party. His leadership position came under challenge both from Walter Ulbricht and from Hermann Schubert, suggesting that even if he had not been killed early the next year, the term of his leadership might still have been brief.

=== Arrest, detention, torture and killing/murder ===
By the second part of 1933 many more party comrades had found their way to Paris or Moscow, and John Schehr was the only member of the party leadership team still hiding out in Germany. The security services arrested him in Berlin on 13 November 1933. This time there would be no question of their letting him go again a week later. He was taken to the Columbia concentration camp, a former military police station on the edge of Berlin that had stood empty since 1929, till its conversion into a prison during 1933. The Gestapo knew that Schehr was a senior party functionary and they did their best to extract statements from him, employing some of the worst forms of torture. He suffered severe burns and there are also reports that one of his eyes was knocked out of its socket. However, the Gestapo failed to extract from him the information that they sought.

It had become known that the Security services had been employing a spy in the secret Berlin headquarters of the Communist Party. This was Alfred Kattner, a one-time confidant of Ernst Thälmann who had been arrested in March 1933, tortured, persuaded to gather information for the security services and then, in August 1933, released. It was believed that information gathered and passed on to his handlers by Kattner had enabled the Gestapo to arrest John Schehr, among others. Kattner's role became known to comrades through the underground press during January 1934 and, after attempts to have him kidnapped and spirited away to Moscow had failed, on 1 February 1934 Alfred Kattner was shot dead by a party official called Hans Schwarz in his Nowawes apartment, just outside Berlin. The National Socialist government was enraged by this turn of events.

At the time of Schehr's arrest other leading party activists were also captured, including Eugen Schönhaar and Rudolf Schwarz. One response to Kattner's killing was an order for the immediate transfer of the men from the Columbia concentration camp to a facility at the Wannsee. An overnight transport was arranged. During the night of 1/2 February 1934 these three, together with Erich Steinfurth (who had been arrested back in March 1933) were shot dead at the Schäferberg / Kilometerberg (hill) on the edge of Berlin by Gestapo personnel, allegedly "while attempting to escape". In reality commentators agree that the murder was an act of quick retribution following the shooting the previous day of the government spy Alfred Kattner. The killings became widely known: even at the time, the authorities made no attempt to refute the view that the authorities' motives for the "act of reckoning" were all too obvious.

== The killer ==
John Schehr und Genossen

Es geht durch die Nacht. Die Nacht ist kalt.
Der Fahrer bremst. Sie halten im Wald.
Zehn Mann Geheime Staatspolizei.
Vier Kommunisten sitzen dabei,
John Schehr und Genossen.

Der Transportführer sagt: "Kein Mensch zu sehn."
John Schehr fragt: "Warum bleiben wir stehn?"
Der Führer flüstert: "Die Sache geht glatt!"
Nun wissen sie, was es geschlagen hat,
John Schehr und Genossen.

Sie sehn, wie die ihre Pistolen ziehn.
John Schehr fragt: "Nicht wahr, jetzt müssen wir fliehn?"
Die Kerle lachen. "Na, wird es bald?
Runter vom Wagen und rein in den Wald,
John Schehr und Genossen!"

John Schehr sagt: "So habt ihr es immer gemacht!
So habt ihr Karl Liebknecht umgebracht!"
Der Führer brüllt: "Schmeißt die Bande raus!"
Und schweigend steigen die viere aus,
John Schehr und Genossen.

Sie schleppen sie in den dunklen Wald.
Und zwölfmal knallt es und widerhallt.
Da liegen sie mit erloschenem Blick,
jeder drei Nahschüsse im Genick,
John Schehr und Genossen.

Erich Weinert

Going through the night. The cold night.
The driver brakes. They stop in the forest.
Ten men of the secret police.
Four communists sit alongside,
John Schehr and comrades.

The leader of the transport says: "No one to be seen."
John Schehr asks: "why aren't we moving?"
The leader whispers: "It's going smoothly!"
Now you [will] know, what it's about,
John Schehr and comrades.

They see how [their guards] draw their pistols.
John Schehr asks: "Is it now that we must escape?"
The lads laugh. "well, will it be soon?
Out of the transport and straight into the wood,
John Schehr and comrades!

John Schehr says: "You always did it like that!
That's how you killed Karl Liebknecht!"
The leader roars: "Throw the bandits out!"
And silently the four get out,
John Schehr and comrades.

They drag themselves into the black of the forest.
Twelve shots: twelve echoes.
They lie there: eyes no longer shine,
Each with three close-shot bullet holes in the neck,
John Schehr and comrades.

Much later it was determined that the killer had been a police officer called Bruno Sattler. After the war and the Nazi regime were over, on 11 August 1947, with Berlin divided into military zones of occupation, a clandestine operation was undertaken from the Soviet occupation zone. This involved the kidnapping from what was becoming known as "West Berlin" of Sattler, who was smuggled across to the east and secretly sentenced to life imprisonment. He was officially (but incorrectly) declared dead in 1949.

Although John Schehr and his three fellow victims became heroic figures in the Soviet occupation zone (relaunched in 1949 as the German Democratic Republic / "East Germany"), the kidnapping and sentencing of their killer never made it to the national schools curriculum. Sattler served his sentence and on 15 October 1972 died in prison, aged 74, under circumstances that were never entirely clear.

His youngest daughter, who had been born in 1942, and with her family had escaped to West Germany after a final cuddle from her father in 1945, grew up convinced that her father was a good man traduced by Soviet propaganda. After reunification she was keen to press for his rehabilitation. She was able to undertake extensive research in the scrupulously maintained files that the East German security services had compiled and maintained during the intervening decades, and she was forced to accept not just that her father was the man who had murdered "John Schehr" and his comrades, but that this had been just the first in a succession of atrocities for which Bruno Sattler had been responsible during the Nazi period, amounting to a highly successful career as a senior Gestapo officer.

== Commemoration ==
=== Weinert's John Schehr und Genossen ===
It is not known precisely when Erich Weinert wrote his ballad-style poem "John Schehr und Genossen" ("John Schehr and comrades"), but it appears to have been written very soon after the killings became public knowledge, probably during 1934. Weinert was a committed antifascist who escaped via the Saarland and Paris to Moscow which is where he spent most of the twelve Nazi years. According to "The Great Soviet Encyclopedia" he published an anthology of poems in Moscow as early as 1934: this may have included his tribute to Schehr, but it would not have been widely available in Germany under the Hitler dictatorship, nor anywhere else in western Europe.

=== Other commemorations ===
After 1945 the western two thirds of Germany was divided into four military occupation zones. In the central region, administered as the Soviet occupation zone, "John Schehr und Genossen" quickly became widely known, and the late John Schehr was quickly elevated to the status of a national icon. There was a pressing need to rename all the streets which since 1933 had been named after National Socialist leaders and characters from their pantheon of German nationalist heroes. Across the region (which in October 1949 was relaunched as the Soviet sponsored the German Democratic Republic (East Germany), the authorities in towns and cities renamed streets, public buildings and other public structures after John Schehr.

John Schehr's grave forms part of the Memorial to the Socialists (German: Gedenkstätte der Sozialisten) in the Friedrichsfelde Central Cemetery, Berlin.

In July 1967 a cargo ship was launched at the government shipyards in Rostock for the East German Deutsche Seereederei fleet and given the name "John Schehr". (Note: The "MS John Schehr" was subsequently broken up in Malta in 1985.)

Already, in 1954, Schehr's physical remains had been disinterred from their resting place in Berlin-Marzahn to the Friedrichsfelde Main Cemetery where they were placed in the "Gedenkstätte der Sozialisten", the special section reserved for heroes of socialism.

Since 1992 his name has appeared on one of the 96 plates incorporated in the Memorial to the Murdered Members of the Reichstag near the Reichstag building in Berlin. Most (though not all) of the streets renamed in his honour during the SBZ and GDR periods retain Schehr's name three decades after reunification, even though he never became a folk hero for generations of westerners in the way he had in the east.

At the Kilometerberg (hill) a memorial still stands to John Schehr and the other resistance activists who were "shot while attempting flight" ("auf der Flucht erschossen"). Since 1954 regular commemoration events have taken place on the site.

Less well preserved is the memorial to Schehr at the former "Steigerkaserne" ("...barracks") in the Drosselberg quarter of Erfurt. This part of the city, previously filled with Soviet-era rows of identical "single family homes" of prefabricated construction, has become semi-derelict as people have moved away since 1990. On the John Schehr memorial, set in a small "grove of honour" a short distance to the right of the main entrance, serious efforts have been made to chisel out the words which are, accordingly, hard to make out. Before 1990 the 4. motorisierte Schützendivision ("Fourth Motorised Defence Division"), which carried the honorary suffix "John Schehr", was stationed in this building.

== Notes ==
Political offices
