= Christian Mahler =

German activist (1905-1966)

- Born: Kurt Hermann Ernst Paul Krüger; 12 November 1905; Hamburg, Germany
- Died: 30 May 1966 (aged 60); Oranienburg, Brandenburg, GDR (East Germany)
- Occupations: Party Official; Police Officer; Director of the Sachsenhausen National Memorial
- Political party: KPD; SED

Christian Mahler (1905–1966) was a Communist Party activist who resisted Nazism and spent most of the Hitler period in forced custody. After 1945, he became a party functionary in the German Democratic Republic and then an increasingly senior Police officer. He concluded his career as the first director of the Sachsenhausen National Memorial.

== Life ==
Christian Mahler was born into a working family. His father was a Hamburg port worker, and Mahler's own working life started with an apprenticeship in shipbuilding. In 1924 he joined the Communist party and the RFB which was effectively the quasi-military wing of the Communist party. Mahler became an official of both organisations in Hamburg and was also employed with the Water-front quasi-military element ("M-Apparat") of the Communist Party's District leadership.

Mahler was arrested in August 1933 for "resistance". In January of that year the NSDAP (Nazi party) had seized power, and the arrest should be seen in the context of their subsequent rapid imposition of a one-party government on Germany. He was convicted and sentenced to a five-year prison term for "Preparation of High Treason together with severe Breach of the Peace and offences against Fire Arms Legislation". After serving his prison sentence he was not released, but was interned in October 1938 in the concentration camp at Sachsenhausen. In 1943 he was transferred from Sachsenhausen to a satellite concentration camp at Falkensee, still in the Berlin area. In the end, it was the Soviets who, in April 1945, released him from internment.

In May 1945 he joined the quasi-military police service which the Soviets were setting up within their zone in what remained of Germany. By 1952 the entire area had been changed into a separate state, the German Democratic Republic, and Mahler had occupied a succession of senior positions within the police service in the Mecklenburg district. Additionally, in 1946 he joined the new country's newly formed ruling Socialist Unity Party (SED / Sozialistische Einheitspartei Deutschlands). In 1949 he underwent a period of training at the Berlin Police Academy, and from 1950 to 1953 he served as the Police Chief both in Mecklenburg and for the adjacent Schwerin district, while holding the rank of Police Inspector/Colonel. In June 1953 serious public unrest triggered a heightened level of nervousness on the part of the national leadership, and in November 1953 Christian Mahler was relieved of his police functions, after it had been determined that he had had contacts with the west ("Westkontakten"). The contacts in question seem to have involved his long-term partner, a Jewish survivor of the regime in the Ravensbrück concentration camp, whose parents lived in Hamburg. By this time the frontier down the middle of Germany, which in 1945 had simply divided the land controlled by the Soviets from that under US or British administration, had assumed a degree of permanence which had not been universally anticipated back in 1945: Hamburg was on the "wrong" side of it from the perspective of the German Democratic Republic.

In December 1953 Christian Mahler obtained a position as Second Secretary of the Party's BPO (business management organisation) at the "Elbewerft Boizenburg", a ship building business located along the lower reaches of the River Elbe which had somehow avoided being either destroyed during the war or physically crated up and shipped to the Soviet Union in 1945/46, and which later gained a reputation for building river cruisers: during the early 1950s the ship yard was completing "Reparations Contracts" for the Soviets and specialising increasingly in fishing boats, notably for the coastal herring fishing business in the Baltic Sea (in German "East Sea"). Mahler remained with the "Elbewerft" ship yard till February 1955. In March 1955 he moved to a position as BPO Secretary ("first secretary of the factory party organisation of the SED") with the VEB "KGW Schweriner Maschinen- und Anlagenbau" heavy engineering company at Schwerin.

In 1959/60 he was briefly a member of the regional council in Schwerin, heading up the Home Affairs department. In 1960 he became the first Director of the Sachsenhausen National Memorial, which was a reconfiguration of the former Nazi-Soviet concentration camp in line with the political imperatives of the time. Mahler retained this position till his death in 1966. At the same time, he was a member of the national Committee of Anti-Fascist Resistance Fighters.

== Awards and honours ==
- 1959 Service Medal of the German Democratic Republic
- 1965 Patriotic Order of Merit
