= Antimilitärischer Apparat =

Intelligence service of the Communist Party of Germany

The Antimilitärischer Apparat (lit. 'Anti-Military Apparatus'), also known as the Militärischer Apparat (M-Apparat), Abteilung Militärpolitik (AM-Apparat; lit. 'Department of Military Policy'), Militärpolitischer Apparat oder Der Apparat (lit. 'the Military-Political Apparatus'), or simply Der Apparat (lit. 'The Apparatus'), was the intelligence service of the Communist Party of Germany (KPD) from 1920 to 1937. Initially, the intelligence service was controlled and financed by the Communist International (Comintern) and later by the Politburo of the Communist Party of the Soviet Union (CPSU). In the early 1920s, the AM-Apparat was intended to prepare for a communist revolution in Germany, which would be known as German October. When the revolution failed, the KPD decided in 1925 that the AM-Apparat should transform into a secret network that monitored KPD functionaries and members. After the Nazis seized power in 1933, Der Apparat, under Soviet influence, became a spy organization that reported directly to the CPSU and the Soviet Red Army and operated independently of the KPD leadership. The intelligence service failed to establish effective resistance against the Nazis in Germany.

== Formation ==
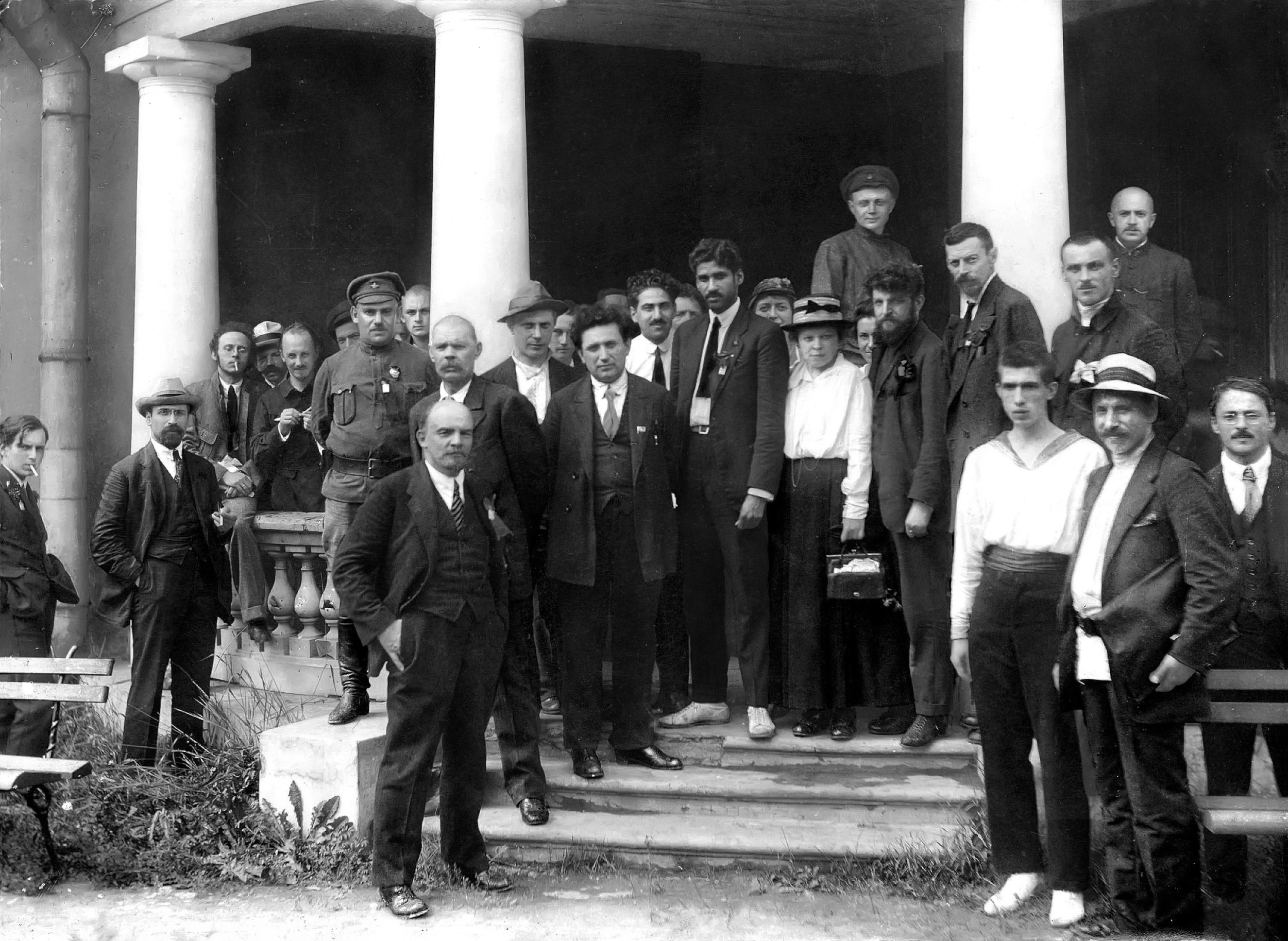
Vladimir Lenin and other delegates of the 2nd World Congress of the Comintern on 19 July 1920, at which all communist parties were called upon to establish secret underground organizations

The AM-Apparat was formed following the resolutions of the 2nd World Congress of the Communist International in 1920, which called upon communist parties to establish, in addition to public and legal mass organizations, illegal apparatuses for the protection of structures and explicitly "for the preparation of armed uprisings." All sections were obligated to "create a parallel organizational apparatus that will assist the party in fulfilling its duty to the revolution at the decisive moment." In effect, this was a demand for the establishment of an underground organization.

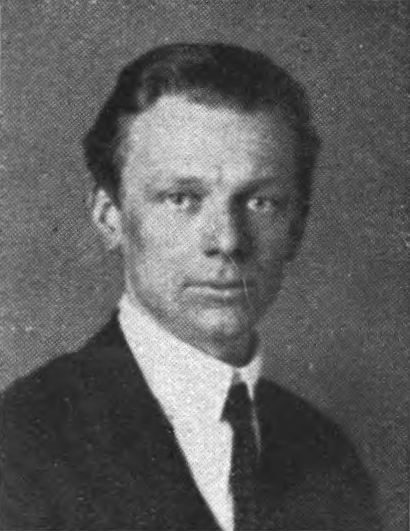
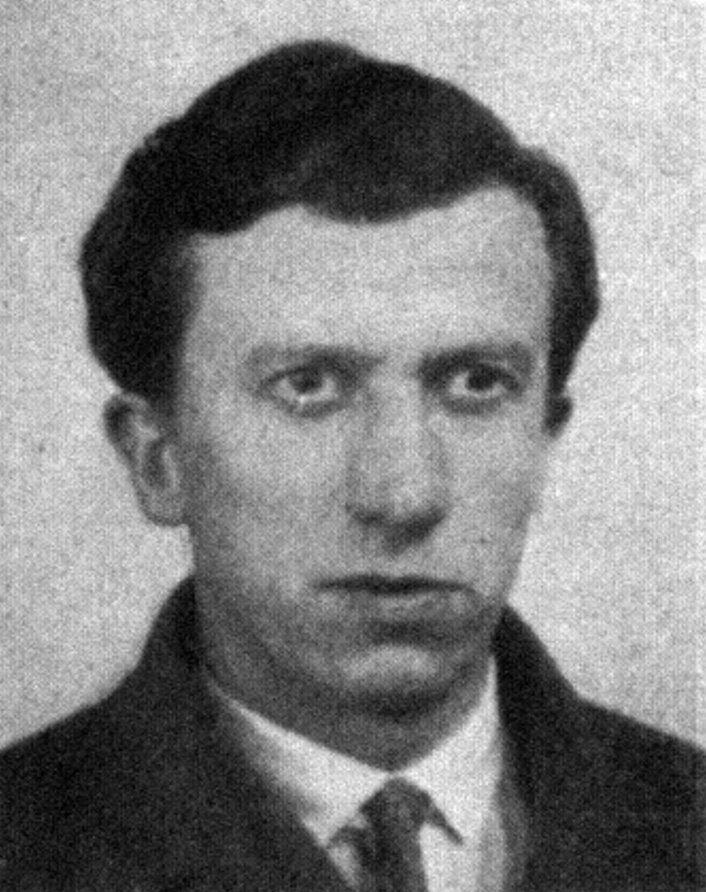
Hugo Eberlein (left) and Hans Kippenberger, the first and last heads of the apparatus

The first head of the KPD's apparatus, which was controlled and financed by the Comintern, was Hugo Eberlein, a founding member of the Comintern. The apparatus comprised various departments for military affairs, intelligence and reconnaissance and subversion. These departments were designated M, N, and Z apparatuses. For cover purposes, the military apparatus was also called the anti-military apparatus. Hans Kippenberger became the first head of the military department. In addition to its primary task of intelligence gathering, from the mid-1920s onward its scope of activities expanded to include the surveillance of undesirable party members and the clandestine collection of information for the Soviet Union. The German apparatus was directly bound by the directives of the Soviet State Political Directorate (GPU) and the Soviet military intelligence service, the GRU.

In the late 1920s, the number of active members of the AM-Apparat was approximately 4,300. At the same time, the KPD political party had about 130,000 members. In addition, there were other organizations such as the Kampfbund gegen den Faschismus (Combat League Against Fascism), the Parteiselbstschutz (Party Self-Defense Force), and the Weapons and Ammunition Stocks Department.

From March 1923 to the autumn of 1924, the AM-Apparat was under the leadership of Woldemar Rose (codename Petr Alexandrovich Skoblewsky). Between 1924 and 1928, Henry Robinson was director of the AM-Apparat for Central and Eastern Europe. In November 1923 Felix Neumann led the Terror Apparatus, or T-Apparat, which was also called the German Cheka by its opponents. In the Cheka trials of 1924/25, which attracted international attention, the KPD leadership distanced itself from the group's terrorist actions.

== German October ==
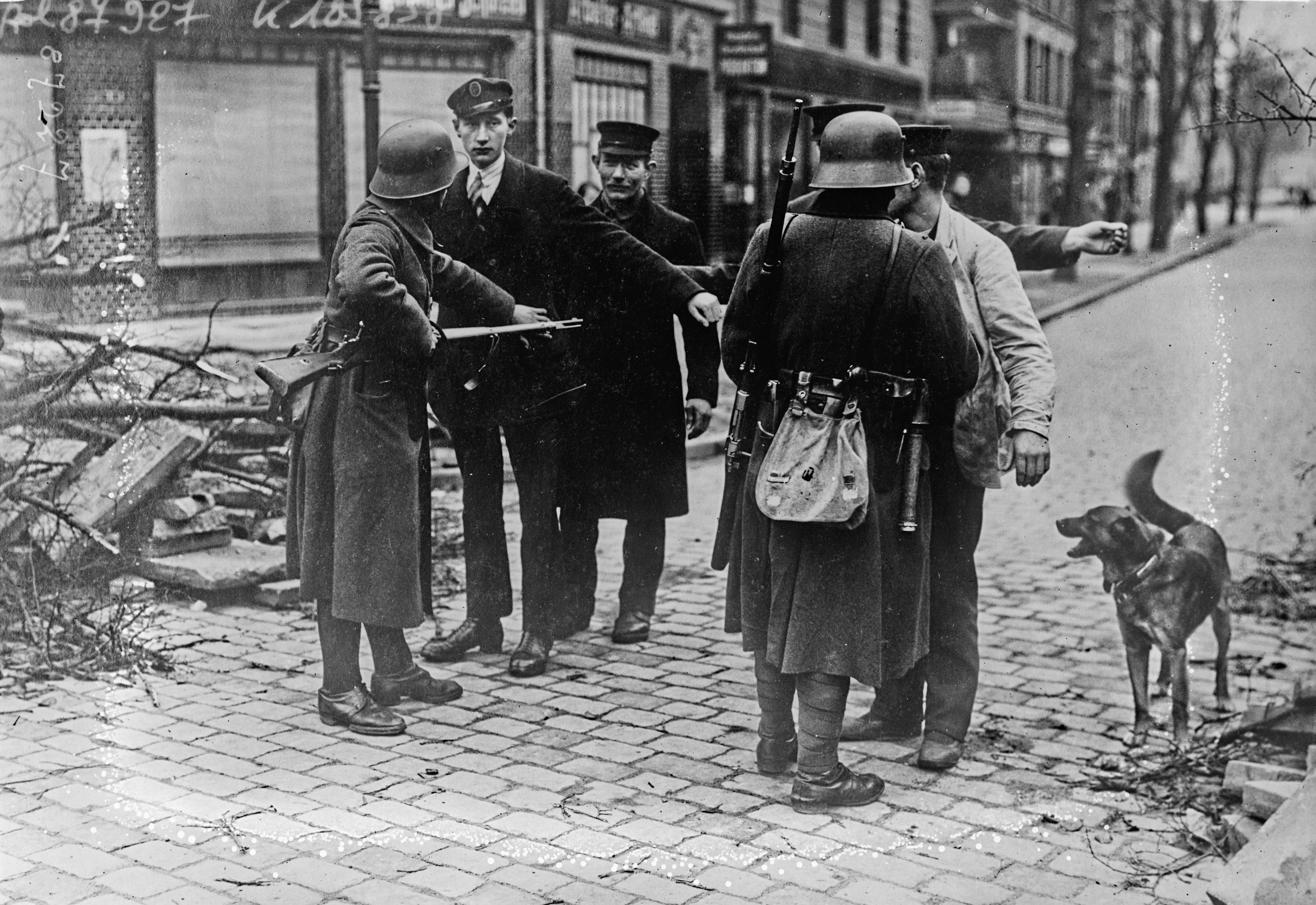
Reichswehr soldiers searching passersby at a barricade during the Hamburg Uprising, October 1923

In 1923, the Executive Committee of the Communist International (ECCI) pursued a strategy of exploiting the Weimar Republic's political crisis to stage an armed uprising in Germany. Following the example of the Russian October Revolution of 1917, the communists aimed to seize power, thereby signaling further revolutions in Central Europe and ultimately achieving world communist revolution. The uprisings, known as the German October, took place primarily in northern Germany. Major unrest occurred in Hamburg.

Leading members of the KPD and the AM-Apparat were involved in planning the Hamburg uprising of October 1923, including the head of the AM-Apparat, Kippenberger. The stance on an armed uprising in Germany was controversial within the communist movement. While influential members of the Comintern supported and planned it, the KPD leadership opposed an uprising. The precise motives of the small Hamburg group remain unclear to this day.

The former KPD functionary and staff member Erich Wollenberg wrote in retrospect that the Hamburg Uprising had been planned as a test balloon for a pan-German revolution and ordered by the Comintern. The KPD leadership had not been informed. A local uprising was intended to "test the waters" to determine whether a revolutionary situation existed in Germany. Should the uprising lead to a mass revolt, the KPD would give the signal for an armed uprising. Should the uprising fail to materialize, the KPD would emerge from the situation without major damage. The uprising failed and collapsed after only one day. However, the events favored the rise of one of the leaders of the insurgents, the later KPD chairman Ernst Thälmann.

== Resistance against Nazism ==
Beginning in 1927, Kippenberger reorganized the KPD apparatus, but was arrested in 1928 during the Reichstag election campaign. However, he was placed on the party's electoral list in Leipzig and was elected. As a result, he had to be released due to his parliamentary immunity. He remained a member of the Reichstag until 1933 and continued to head the apparatus, as well as being a candidate member of the KPD Central Committee from 1929. In addition, from 1932, Kippenberger built up an independent network of approximately 300 employees for factory reporting, the so-called Betriebsberichterstattung (BB-Ressort). It was a quasi-military body, which undertook economic espionage tasks on behalf of the Soviet Union and also reported more generally on social, political and economic developments during what was a period of rising tension inside Germany. Henry Robinson became head of the BB-Department in France in 1933. The Nazis described this network as the "most dangerous apparatus of the KPD". By the end of 1935, the Gestapo had succeeded in dismantling the BB-Department.

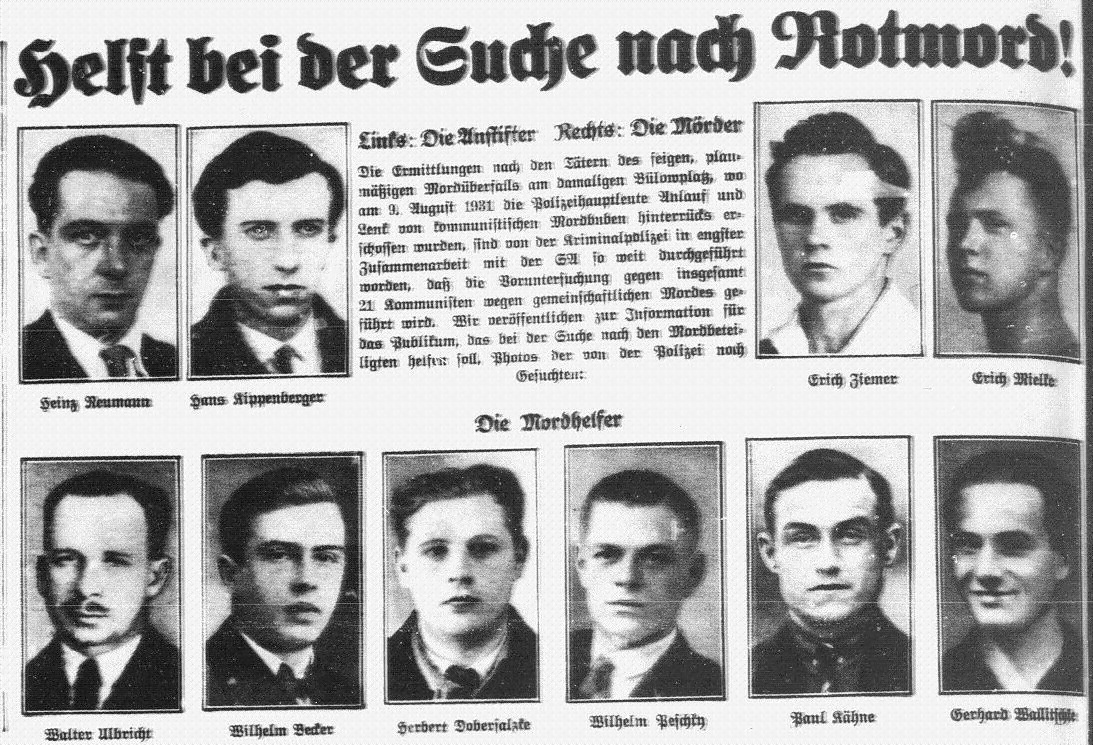
"Help in the search for the Red Murderers!" A wanted poster published the Berlin Police following the murder of two police officers, September 1933. The head of the apparatus, Hans Kippenberger (top row, second from left), a member of the Reichstag until March 1933, fled to the Soviet Union in 1935.

In August 1931, Kippenberger, along with Heinz Neumann, was a key instigator of the murders of police officers Paul Anlauf and Franz Lenck at Bülowplatz in Berlin. He was wanted by the police for this crime from September 1933 onward. In March 1933, the Reichstag Fire Decree banned communist activity in Germany, thus making all party activities illegal. Following the arrest of the KPD leader Ernst Thälmann on 3 March 1933 and many others in the following weeks and months, an internal power struggle between different factions erupted within the KPD leadership, which persisted even after massive Soviet influence. Walter Ulbricht and Franz Dahlem emerged as the party's leaders in exile, initially organizing the underground party activities from Prague. However, neither had direct access to the party apparatus, which, through its own communication channels, was directly subordinate to the Politburo of the CPSU. The AM-Apparat's primary tasks during this period were to protect the party's illegal activities from the Gestapo, to expose informants, and to gather information from German power centers as well as secret military and armaments intelligence for Soviet intelligence services.

Due to the ever-increasing pressure from the Nazi authorities, who repeatedly succeeded in infiltrating the organization, and the conflicts with the KPD's exiled leadership, the organization was unable to mount an effective resistance against Nazism in Germany. From 1933 onward, hundreds of members of the organization were exposed, arrested, and interned in concentration camps. Many were murdered; others managed to escape abroad, mostly to the Soviet Union. By 1935, all public party structures had been dismantled, and over a thousand functionaries were arrested in Berlin alone.

== Resolution ==
Kippenberger emerged as an opponent of Ulbricht in the ongoing conflicts among exiled KPD functionaries as he used the AM-Apparat to aid them. Ulbricht attempted to eliminate Kippenberger and bring the apparatus under his control. Even before his departure for Prague in 1935, Ulbricht requested an investigation in Moscow into the work of the intelligence service and the conduct of its chief. Ulbricht claimed that Kippenberger was spreading "party-subversive rumors." At the same time, he pointed to shortcomings in the work of the intelligence service.

Other functionaries, such as prominent communist Herbert Wehner, had also already criticized the work of the apparatus. Contacts with party districts were only sporadic, he said, and the right lessons were not being learned from arrests. There were too few informants within the Gestapo to organize effective counterintelligence.

In January 1935, the investigation requested by Ulbricht began. The KPD functionary and later East German politician Wilhelm Pieck was a member of the commission formed for this purpose. In February 1935, he accused Kippenberger of "insufficiently adapting the apparatus to the illegal conditions of the party". Kippenberger was held responsible for the party's decline.

On 22 April 1935, the CPSU in Moscow passed a resolution concerning the future activities of the intelligence service. It demanded that counterintelligence efforts be intensified. The service was obligated to more effectively monitor the lifestyles and political activities of German party officials in Germany and in exile. Furthermore, it was granted the right to object to the appointment of officials to positions of responsibility.

Kippenberger was ordered to relocate his headquarters to Prague. The Politburo did not comply with Ulbricht's and Dahlem's demands to place the intelligence service under their control. In July 1935, Dahlem declared: “(…) there is one point on which we disagree. That is the relationship of the apparatus to the leadership, to the Polburo. We disagree with the statement that the apparatus receives its directives directly from Moscow (…) We have no desire to assume responsibility in Prague if we do not have control and issue the political directives.”

At the KPD's Brussels Conference in October 1935 in Kuntsevo near Moscow, Pieck and Ulbricht definitively established themselves as the KPD's leaders in exile. Their internal critics were removed from all their positions. The apparatus was once again heavily criticized, and Kippenberger was accused of having evaded the party's influence and of turning the intelligence service into a tool for factional infighting within the party. Furthermore, the apparatus was suspected of being infiltrated by enemy agents. Kippenberger and other leading functionaries of the apparatus were subsequently removed from office and summoned to Moscow. Further investigations were carried out by the Comintern

Kippenberger and other leading functionaries of the apparatus were then summoned to Moscow. A report from the Personnel Department of the Executive Committee of the Comintern (ECCI) identified weaknesses in the work of the KPD's intelligence service and criticized the lack of guidance and control by the Politburo or other bodies. It contained accusations, such as the allegation that the apparatus failed to adequately protect KPD Chairman Ernst Thälmann from his arrest. Furthermore, it accuses the intelligence work of having "excessively veered into outright espionage," which "no longer serves the interests of the party." The report called for the KPD apparatus to be increasingly deployed for the "systematic vetting of leadership and functionaries." Its role, it states, is "to promote and monitor party unity."

The report was discussed in the Politburo when it was published on 19 March 1936. During this meeting, the Politburo reaffirmed its view that the intelligence apparatus bore decisive responsibility for the KPD's precarious situation and subsequently dissolved it in 1937. The majority of the apparatus's employees in the USSR were arrested by the NKVD. Many of them were sentenced to long periods of imprisonment in labor camps or to death. The Military Collegium of the Supreme Court of the Soviet Union found Kippenberger guilty of spying for enemy intelligence services and belonging to a terrorist group. The former close confidant of Ernst Thälmann was murdered in Moscow on 3 October 1937.

In the following months of the Great Terror in the Soviet Union, which also led to the persecution of thousands of German communists living in Soviet exile, materials previously compiled by the intelligence service were frequently used as the basis for accusations against party members.

== Ideological precursor ==
Many historians consider the AM-Apparat to be the ideological precursor of the East Germany's (GDR) Ministry for State Security (MfS, commonly known as the Stasi), which made great efforts to monitor the GDR's population and employed over 90,000 full-time and more than 100,000 unofficial collaborators in the later years of the GDR. German journalism scholar Kurt Koszyk describes it as a "precursor to the security doctrine of the Socialist Unity Party of Germany and the MfS."

The historian Ilko-Sascha Kowalczuk writes about the MfS: "It was a secret police force whose defining characteristic was its work within the state's territory and its inability to be controlled except by its superiors. Its work and structures drew on the experiences of the Soviet secret police as well as on the secret structures established within the KPD apparatus in the 1920s."

The MfS itself explicitly considered the KPD apparatus to be its precursor. In the early 1980s, Erich Mielke, the long-serving Minister for State Security, initiated a research project to scientifically substantiate this claim.

Many former members of the apparatus became employees of the Ministry for State Security and the intelligence services of the GDR.

== Members ==
=== Leaders ===
- Willi Budich, head of the precursor to the AM-Apparat during the German Revolution of 1918–1919
- Hugo Eberlein, head of the Apparatus during the March Action
- Woldemar Rose, head of the AM-Apparat during the German October
- Hans Kippenberger, head of the AM-Apparat during the murder of Paul Anlauf and Franz Lenck
- Hermann Dünow, head of the AM-Apparat following Adolf Hitler's rise to power
- Hermann Nuding, head of the AM-Apparat in exile
- Henry Robinson, head of the AM-Apparat for Central and Eastern Europe
- Wilhelm Bahnik, head of the BB-Department of the AM-Apparat
- Werner Scholem, head of the Information Department of the AM-Apparat
- Theodor Bottländer, head of the Reichswehr Department of the AM-Apparat
- Rudolf Schwarz, head of the Reichswehr Department of the AM-Apparat
- Felix Neumann, head of the Terror AM-Apparat
- Albert Schreiner, head of the Wasserkante (Hamburg-Schleswig-Holstein) district of the AM-Apparat during the Hamburg Uprising
- Joseph Gutsche, head of the Berlin-Brandenberg district of the AM-Apparat
- Karl Schirdewan, head of the Young Communist League section of the AM-Apparat
- Richard Staimer, head of the Reichswehr Department of the AM-Apparat in Nuremberg

=== Agents ===
- Leo Bauer, codenamed "Rudi"
- Helene Berner, industrial espionage specialist
- Otto Braun, journalist and counter-espionage specialist, husband of Olga Benário Prestes
- Friedrich Broede, participated in the murder of Paul Anlauf and Franz Lenck
- Walter Caro, chemist, associate of Erna Eifler
- Gertrud Classen, party functionary, associate of Apparatus agents Hans Kippenberger and Leo Roth
- Herbert Crüger, mole in the SA
- Walter Czollek, publisher
- Berta Daniel, photographer, associate of Apparatus agent Eugen Schönhaar
- Erna Eifler, secretary to Apparatus agent Wilhelm Bahnik, wife of Apparatus agent Walter Caro
- Semyon Firin, NKVD agent
- Marie Luise von Hammerstein, lawyer and daughter of Kurt von Hammerstein-Equord
- Ottomar Geschke, codenamed "Polar Bear"
- Karl-Günther Heimsoth, informer and former Nazi
- Hans Kahle, chairman of the Arbeiter-Radio-Bund Deutschlands
- Wilhelm Kling, newspaper editor
- Luise Kraushaar, secretary to Apparatus agents Leo Roth and Wilhelm Bahnik
- Bruno Leuschner, contributor to the newspaper Der Rote Wedding
- Richard Linsert, sexologist
- Ernst Lohagen, military leader of the Ruhr Red Army
- Christian Mahler, Roter Frontkämpferbund functionary
- Paul Massing, academic
- Max Matern, participated in the murder of Paul Anlauf and Franz Lenck
- Erich Mielke, participated in the murder of Paul Anlauf and Franz Lenck
- Ewald Munschke, labourer
- Heinz Neumann, participated in the Hamburg Uprising
- Olga Benário Prestes, stenographer, wife of Otto Braun
- Jakob Reich, publisher, associate of AM-Apparat agent Karl Retzlaw
- Karl Retzlaw, manager of Hoym-Verlag, associate of Apparatus agent Jakob Reich
- Beppo Römer, former Freikorps member
- Leo Roth, secretary to Apparatus head Hans Kippenberger, national instructor for the Apparatus
- Willy Sägebrecht, instructor for the Apparatus in the Berlin-Brandenberg district
- Eugen Schönhaar, associate of Apparatus agent Berta Daniel
- Kurt Schulze, radio operator
- Willi Stoph, Young Communist League functionary
- Anna Tieke, Women's Department functionary
- Johann Wenzel, instructor for the AM-Apparat
- Erich Wollenberg, journalist and Red Army officer
- Irene Wosikowski, political leader of the Young Communist League in Hamburg
- Wilhelm Zaisser, military leader of the Ruhr Red Army
- Erich Ziemer, participated in the murder of Paul Anlauf and Franz Lenck

== See also ==
- Roter Soldatenbund, the first paramilitary of the Spartacus League and KPD
- Proletarische Hundertschaften, the second paramilitary of the KPD
- Roter Frontkämpferbund, the third paramilitary of the KPD
- Kampfbund gegen den Faschismus, the fourth paramilitary of the KPD
- Parteiselbstschutz, the paramilitary of the AM-Apparat
- Deutsche Tscheka, the Terror Apparatus of the KPD
- Harro Schulze-Boysen, an AM-Apparat informant in the Luftwaffe
- Armed Insurrection, a book on guerilla warfare co-written by AM-Apparat members
