= Justice Daniels =

Justice Daniels may refer to:

- Charles Daniels (New York politician) (1825–1897), justice of the New York Supreme Court, and ex officio a judge of the New York Court of Appeals
- Charles W. Daniels (1943–2019), associate justice of the New Mexico Supreme Court

== See also ==
- Justice Daniel (disambiguation)
- Daniels (disambiguation)
