= Bruno Sattler =

German Nazi police officer

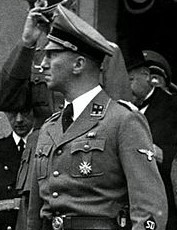
- Bruno Sattler in Belgrade, 1943
- Born: 17 April 1898; Schmargendorf, Charlottenburg-Wilmersdorf, German Empire
- Died: 15 October 1972 (aged 74); Leipzig-Meusdorf, Saxony, East Germany
- Occupations: Salesman; Senior Police Officer (Gestapo); Police Chief in occupied Serbia
- Political party: Nazi Party
- Spouse: Elfriede (1904–1984)
- Children: At least 3
- Status: Deceased
- Conviction: Crimes against humanity
- Penalty: Life imprisonment

Bruno Sattler (17 April 1898 – 15 October 1972) became a member (Note: Party Membership Number 637,934) of the Nazi Party during the closing months of 1931. After the Hitler government took power at the start of 1933 he joined the Gestapo, achieving a succession of promotions during the ensuing decade. In 1942 he was posted to Belgrade with the rank of "SS-Sturmbannführer", as Gestapo Police Chief for occupied Serbia. He remained in post until October 1944, when the German occupation of the territory was ended. He turned up with a false name in Berlin during 1947, but was evidently identified. In October 1947 he was abducted by the Soviet security services from what later became known as West Berlin, and taken to the eastern part of the city in the Soviet occupation zone. His family heard nothing more from him and in 1949 he was pronounced dead. He had actually been detained, probably in the occupied zone that became the East Germany in October 1949. Several major atrocities committed during the Nazi era were associated with Sattler, and it became known much later that in 1952 he faced trial "for his Gestapo activities". It was only by chance that a year later his wife learned that he was still alive. By then, he was serving a life sentence after being convicted of war crimes by the Greifswald District Court. According to some sources, the circumstances of Sattler's death in the prison hospital at the jail in Leipzig-Meusdorf in 1972 never became clear. Elsewhere it is stated that he was shot dead in his prison cell.

== Life ==
=== Provenance and early years ===
Bruno Sattler was born at Schmargendorf, a rapidly expanding municipality on the south-western edge of Berlin, into which it has subsequently been subsumed. During the First World War he deferred the final part of his schooling in order to serve with the Imperial Army in France. He therefore passed his "Abitur" (school graduation exam) only in 1919, the year of his twenty-first birthday. Passing the Abitur opened the way to university-level education, and he embarked on a course of study in Applied Economics and Botany. He pursued his studies for three years. He also found time to join the Ehrhardt Brigade, one of the "Freikorps" units of defeated former imperial army soldiers that emerged during the months of revolution which broke out after the war. In March 1920 Sattler took part, on the side of the right-wing insurgents, in the anti-government "Kapp Putsch" (short-lived uprising -) which failed in its objective of overthrowing the new republican government) Sattler's father died in 1922. Any accumulated savings that the family might have had were eaten up by the collapse in the value of money. Sattler was obliged to cut short his education and earn money in order to support his own needs and those of his mother. He worked at a succession of casual jobs. One of these was a selling job which involved selling watches and silver jewellery at Berlin's Wertheim department store. Bruno Sattler had imbibed to the full his parents' "traditional values", which in his case involved not just the rather nostalgic nationalism that was widespread among those hankering for "the good old days, before the war", but also a gnawing antisemitism. It did nothing for his self-esteem that the young man had ended up selling watches in a store established and owned by a leading Jewish entrepreneur.

=== Police service ===
Meanwhile, he remained in contact with his "Freikorps" comrades from the time of the insurrection. One of them was by this time working for the police service, and through this contact Sattler also received and accepted the offer of a job in the police service, joining the "Criminal police" in 1928. Almost immediately he was picked out for a training programme for future "Criminal Commissars". He was also becoming more politicised. By 1945 the National Socialist Party had more than ten million members, but in the early 1930s, although the intensified polarisation of politics was beginning to spill out into the streets, National Socialism was still a minority movement. Membership numbers run more or less chronologically, though there appear to have been several batches running concurrently. From Sattler's membership number it is apparent that he joined the party in October or November 1931. Further evidence of his political preferences and inclinations comes from his switch from the "Criminal Police" to the "Political Police" in 1933.

=== Gestapo ===
The change of government in January 1933 was followed by a rapid retreat from democracy. During those early months, the old Prussian Secret Police service was renamed as the "Geheime Staatspolizei" ("Gestapo"): equivalent political police services from other parts of Germany were merged into it to create, for the first time in Germany, a nationwide political police service. Bruno Sattler was an eager early recruit. After the passage during March of the Enabling Act, a series of further measures were implemented by the government during the summer of 1933 which had the effect of abandoning parliamentary government and outlawing political parties (with the obvious exception of the ruling party). The authorities were particularly keen to stamp out political activism by those who had hitherto been members of the Communist Party or of the Social Democratic Party. During the second half of the year Sattler was appointed to take charge of the Gestapo department responsible for surveillance of those who had been active members of the Social Democratic Party and of Trades Unions affiliated to the party, along with certain other fringe parties and movements of the centre-left. According to a surviving Gestapo organisation chart dated 22 January 1934 he was at that time in charge of "Department III B2: SPD, SAP, Reichsbanner, Trades Unions and Special Projects". During this period he was the handler of a number of "V-Männer" (informants). One of these, recruited by Sattler in the summer of 1936, was Herbert Kriedemann who after the war served as a long-standing member of the West German Bundestag (parliament) (SPD) between 1949 and 1972. Kriedemann, who was identified in Gestapo records by the code-name "S-9", always refuted reports to this effect; but researchers reacted to his denials by investigating his involvement in greater depth: a number of plausible sources insist that Herbert Kriedemann was one of Bruno Sattler's "Gestapo spies", irrespective of Kriedemann's own denials.

It was as an ambitious still relatively young Gestapo officer, on the night of 1/2 February 1934, that Sattler was responsible for the killing of four communist detainees, John Schehr, Eugen Schönhaar, Erich Steinfurth and Rudolf Schwarz at the "Schäferberg" (just outside Berlin), "while they were attempting to escape". The incident later became mythologised, and the subject of a frequently broadcast ballad-song, in East Germany. Although Sattler was in charge of the group of Gestapo men escorting the prisoners when the incident took place, it was never known whether or not he fired any of the fatal shots. Nevertheless, according to subsequent research by his daughter (who became a journalist) it was Sattler who gave the order to shoot.

=== Reichssicherheitshauptamt (RSHA) ===
In September 1939 the Reich Security Main Office Reichssicherheitshauptamt (RSHA) was established by Heinrich Himmler. Bruno Sattler immediately assumed leadership of the new organisation's "Department IV A2", with responsibilities covering Sabotage Prevention, Political-Police Defence and Political Counterfeiting operations. A few months later he was posted to Potsdam to work alongside Reinhold Heller of the "SS". As overall head of Department IV, during the summer of 1940 he was briefly posted to newly occupied Brussels, responsible for taking care of the files of the Second Socialist International which had been based in the Belgian capital between 1935 and 1940.

Like other RSHA staff, Sattler was assigned to what the head of the RSHA, Reinhard Heydrich, liked to refer to as the "Kämpfende Verwaltung" ("Fighting Administration") - elsewhere identified as Germany's "[paramilitary] taskforces", which were much expanded at the time of the German invasion of the Soviet Union. In this context he seems to have served in Byelorussia and Russia, although even his family was being kept in the dark as to his whereabouts by this point. Between September 1941 and January 1942 Sattler was listed as an "orderly officer" of "Advance Command Moscow" of the Special Commando with "Taskforce Group B". It emerged much later that during 1941 Sattler was a member of the "Einsatzgruppe B" (taskforce) which is believed to have murdered 90,000 in Smolensk. He was later part of an equivalent task force mandated to take over the Interior Ministry in Moscow, but Moscow held out. After "Advance Command Moscow" was dissolved, the unit comprising the survivors was rebranded as "Department SK 7c".

=== Belgrade ===
At the start of 1942 Sattler was promoted to the rank of "SS-Sturmbannführer" and "[Police] Kriminaldirektor", ahead of his posting to Belgrade. In Belgrade he took over "Department IV" which was the Gestapo department responsible for security in occupied Serbia. In this role he reported directly to SS-Oberführer Emanuel Schäfer, the Befehlshaber der Sicherheitspolizei und des SD. Sources covering Sattler's time in Belgrade between 1942 and 1944 lean heavily, both directly and indirectly, on court reports of Sattler's (at the time) secret trial, held at the District Court in Greifswald in July 1952. There is an inevitable focus on the atrocities in which he was involved. Complementary research that would not have been possible before 1990 has nevertheless endorsed assessments relating to his culpability, notwithstanding sometimes highly critical evaluations of the East German justice system.

At the time when Sattler took charge of the Belgrade Gestapo, the department was already an established key element in the military administration of the region. From Sattler's party-loyal perspective, there was nevertheless much unfinished business left by Schäfer's predecessor as BdS, SS-Oberführer Wilhelm Fuchs. Schäfer found that there were still 6,280 Jews - mostly women and children - alive at the nearby "Semlin" Concentration Camp. By July 1942, SS-Gruppenführer Harald Turner, the chief of the military administration staff, was able to report in a letter that Serbia was "Judenfrei" (Free of Jews). In more general terms, as the 1952 trial report noted, the responsibilities of the Gestapo in Belgrade were the same as those of Gestapo officers throughout the occupied territories of Europe: with a particular focus on the fight against Communism and the [anti-Nazi] Resistance Movements. In Belgrade, Sattler worked with a team of approximately 30 people with backgrounds in the Gestapo, Criminal law enforcement and Secret Police work. While assigned to "Department IV" in Belgrade, they all enjoyed the status of Gestapo officers. An "ethnic German" simultaneous translator, able to work with the necessary local languages, was permanently available to each of them.

Records of the 1952 trial state that following Sattler's installation as Belgrade's Gestapo chief, the population of Yugoslavia was subjected to merciless persecution and mass killings. Through his adept recruitment and control of a network of informants Sattler received details of the structural organisation and activities of all the resistance groups in the region. Through tapping various radio communications, as well as the transmissions of 12 underground radio stations across Serbia, he obtained critical reports which he used to plan and carry through savage reprisal measures against the resistance groups. The prime target of the network of agents and spies that Sattler ran were those identified as leaders in the resistance groups. This made it possible to "dig out" resistance leaders and arrest their family members at the same time. The number of antifascist resistance fighters arrested on Sattler's watch in Belgrade was given as around 3,000. If their interrogators were satisfied that they had nothing to do with resistance, detainees were quickly released. Others were detained in custody in the immediate term, and then either shipped to Germany as forced labourers or else held as hostages. Decisions in this respect were in effect in the hands of Sattler. They were signed off by his immediate superior, Schäfer, who almost always followed Sattler's recommendations. When it came to those held back as hostages, initially these were shot dead in the ratio of 100 for every German soldier believed killed by resistance partisans. The ratio was later reduced to 20 hostages shot for every German soldier killed. The hostages selected for these killings were generally males aged between 20 and 50. These were transported by truck to the firing range and then shot in batches of ten, their bodies then buried close by. Shootings were carried out under the direct supervision of Schäfer by companies of ethnic German guards. This approach resulted in too many "failures", however, when too many of those tasked with shooting hostages "fell over because they could not bear to see the blood flowing". After this the shooting of hostages was entrusted to Chief Commissar Brandt and his deputy, a man called Everding, who had volunteered for the duty. Shootings of German soldiers by resistance activists were relatively infrequent. There were three reprisal shootings reported where the number of hostages killed was 100 and ten where the number of hostages killed was 20. The 1952 trial court was told that Sattler did not himself participate in any of these hostage shootings. He saw his own role as an administrative one.

=== Vienna ===
In October 1944 the Germans troops and administrators were ejected from Serbia by a potent - if slightly implausible - de facto alliance between Yugoslav Partisans and the Soviet army. By December 1944 Sattler had made his way to Vienna where between 18 December and 9 May 1945 he was involved in the so-called "Hungarian Repatriation" ("ungarische Rückführungsaktion") operation. During the winter of 1944/45 he was one of those responsible for eliminating the few surviving Jews in the Hungarian concentration camps. 9 May 1945 was a significant date because it was the date on which, for records produced with reference to Moscow time, the war ended in German defeat. (The countryside around Vienna and much of the city itself was already under Soviet military occupation.)

=== Moving on ===
It is not clear precisely when or in how much detail the Soviet government and western allies agreed how post-war Austria should be divided between the military administrations of their respective armies, but by May 1945 it was evidently apparent to Bruno Sattler that Linz would mark the frontier between the Soviet occupation zone surrounding Vienna and the US occupation zone surrounding Salzburg, with the Soviets on the north shore of the river and the Americans on the south side. On or shortly after 9 May 1945 Bruno Sattler crossed the river, armed with six different sets of identity papers and a plan. Mindful, at least in outline, of the inevitability of approaching Cold War, and through the mediation of his wife, he intended to make contact with the Americans and offer his services as a man with useful knowledge of how to track down and locate communists. But in the immediate term his overriding objective was to avoid capture: for a year and a half he lived hidden by a cousin, in the American zone. Early in 1947 he turned up in the by this time diminished mountain of rubble that had been Berlin where he lay low in a boarding house in the Dettmannstrasse (today renamed as the Stauffenbergstrasse). His wife and three daughters were already living in Berlin: his youngest daughter recalls that Elfriede knew her husband was back in town and met up with him several times. In August he stopped turning up for their appointments, however: his wife, increasingly desperate, was left walking up and down the streets in the area for day after day with her three daughters in tow, until the family were finally informed by a helpful police officer that Bruno Sattler had been "arrested by Soviet soldiers".

=== Kidnapped ===
In fact the men who knocked Sattler down on a street in West Berlin, and then bundled him into a covered truck on 11 August 1947, although they were indeed kitted out in Soviet military uniforms, were almost certainly all Germans, and members of "Department K5", on a mission from the Soviet occupation zone. (Note: There are estimates that during the years directly after the war between 500 and 700 suspected "former Nazis" were lifted from the streets of West Berlin by kidnap squads from the "East Berlin" in the Soviet occupation zone.) After the Soviet zone was relaunched in 1949 as the Soviet sponsored German Democratic republic, "Department K5" evolved into the huge and widely feared snooper-bureaucracy that was the East German Ministry for State Security ("Stasi"). One member of the kidnap team was Erich Mielke, who after 1957 became known as the long-standing and highly effective Stasi head. In 1949 reports surfaced that Bruno Sattler had successfully undergone a denazification process and was dead. Someone had seen him being beaten to death in the "bunker" (formerly used as a vast air-raid shelter and subsequently commandeered by the Soviet troops) at one end of Schumannstrasse in the city centre. Elfriede evidently believed he was dead, sharing the information with the couple's three daughters. On the basis of the evidence available she was even able to obtain a death certificate issued by the Berlin Senate (city government) attesting not only to Sattler's death, but also to a successful programme of denazification completed before his supposed death. Sattler was at this stage very much alive, however. He was still being subjected to interrogation in a succession of prisons in East Germany and - according to some sources the Soviet Union. The East German authorities had every intention of keeping him alive at least until they had extracted from his all the information they could concerning his own interrogation of communists resistance fighters during the war. Under intense pressure from Moscow and their own paranoid leaders in (East) Berlin, the authorities were, in particular, keen to know "which comrade had betrayed which comrade(s) under Nazi questioning" administered, or at least logged, by Sattler. Sattler could look forward to a lifelong prison sentence, but for at least as long as the authorities thought they might extract more information from him, his life seems not to have been in immediate danger.

It was only in 1952 that Bruno Sattler's case came to trial at the Greifswald District Court and the life-sentence was formally handed down. It was indirectly as a result of that trial, and through a remarkable coincidence, that Elfriede Sattler discovered that her husband was still alive. One of her brothers faced a criminal trial at the same court for selling strawberries on the black market. It turned out that the defence attorney allocated for his case was the man who had also been tasked with defending Bruno Sattler. Through her brother's reports Elfriede and her daughters learned something of Sattler's trial and situation, though more detailed information would become available only four decades later.

=== Death ===
According to one source, on 10 October 1972 Bruno Sattler was taken to an execution cell - known to inmates as "the submarine" in reference to its airless windowless condition and small size - at the prison in Leipzig-Meusdorf where he was being held and killed - or executed - with a single shot to the head. Most sources give the date of his dearth as 15 October 1972. Several sources give the actual place of his death as the "prison hospital". Access, after 1990, to Stasi records do not clarify the precise details of when, how or indeed why Sattler was killed in 1972. In one of the files, in records of a questioning of someone else, it is indeed noted that Sattler had actually been sentenced to death at or shortly following his trial in July 1952. In another file it is recorded that payments from West Germany kept him alive till 1972, as a slightly unconventional case in the context of the [still, in 1972] top secret "Häftlingsfreikauf" programme. A favoured theory extrapolated from these sources is that the reasons for keeping Sattler alive disappeared after representatives of Chancellor Brandt and First Secretary Honecker signed off on the "Basic Treaty" in 1972 whereby the governments of East and West Germany acknowledged the existence each of the other, reducing invasion fears on both sides. Now that the two governments were, at some levels, communicating officially, the risk that a former senior Gestapo officer who had been tried and convicted twenty years earlier in respect of a succession of major atrocities, might be found still alive in an East German prison became politically unacceptable. It was time to get rid of Bruno Sattler.

== Beate ==
Beate Niemann, the youngest of the Sattler's three daughter, was born in November 1942. Her father was away in Serbia at the time. Apart for a few heavily circumscribed prison visits after 1958, the last time she ever saw him she was barely more than a toddler, though she was just a few weeks short of her thirtieth birthday at the time of his killing across the border in Leipzig. As she grew up she was always told by her mother that her father was a man she should be proud of, but changed the subject or closed down the conversation if the child tried to find out more. After 1958 it became possible for West German mothers and children to visit their husbands/fathers in East German jails, and she undertook the trip with her mother several times. The circumstances of the brief meetings were heavily circumscribed by East German bureaucracy, however, and her father remained a figure of mystery. Meanwhile, at the apartment block in which they lived in West Berlin their neighbours were all members of the West Berlin police service, since her mother also worked for the police in an administrative capacity. When the neighbours talked of her father at all, it was to commend his qualities both as a man and as a policeman. There was much sympathy over the fate that had unfairly befallen him in the other Germany. Beate grew up to become a child of the '60s, dropping out of school a year before completing the curriculum, thereby ruling out conventional university-level education and later joining demonstrations against the Vietnam War and the seminal Berlin street demonstration against the shah's visit in 1967. She nevertheless enjoyed a varied career, which included work as both as a physiotherapist and as a foreign correspondent. Towards the end of her working career she worked for Amnesty International, a human-rights pressure organisation. During the 1960s she had already obtained confirmation that her father had been a member of the National Socialist ("Nazi") Party. The US authorities had obtained a copy of the complete membership list from the Soviets who had found it in the eastern part of Berlin. West Berliners had no direct access to any copy of the list, which the American authorities kept in a basement storage facility, but lawyers were permitted access, so she persuaded the friend of a father who was also a lawyer to undertake a search through the almost eleven million names on her behalf. Although he found her father's party membership record, he reported back that he had found nothing more of substance. After the death in 1984 of her widowed mother, she began more urgently trying to find out more about her father. However, she had just married her second husband: he in 1985 was posted to India. Despite tantalising glimpses provided by contacts with the older generation, notably the Liberal politician and - as it later transpired, a highly regarded by Markus Wolf - East German spy, William Borm, relocating to India meant that a more systematic investigation of the truth about her father would have to wait. From Bombay, still accepting at face value the assurances of her late mother and others in the police service, Beate Niemann applied to the court in Germany that had sentenced Sattler for the monstrously unjust sentence to be posthumously annulled. This occurred shortly after Reunification, which she experienced only at a distance. A reply arrived unexpectedly quickly, stating that the case had been re-examined, and that if the trial had taken place in West Germany, her father would not have received a life sentence. But he would nevertheless have been sentenced to serve "a number of years" in prison. Appalled at the injustice, she immediately lodged an appeal.

In 1992 Beate Neumann returned from Bombay to Berlin. In the wake of reunification it was becoming possible for interested parties to visit the Stasi Records agency which held a vast collection of reports on individuals and society in East Germany that had been compiled by officers of the Ministry for State Security (Stasi) and their army of secret informants between 1949 and 1989. There was still widespread shock and horror across the two halves of Germany at the extent of the surveillance state that the Stasi had operated, but for Beate Niemann the existence of the Stasi files seemed to offer the possibility that she might find out more about her father from those records. Not all the files had survived the "bonfires of evidence" hastily ignited by Stasi officers, as the control apparatus of the East German dictatorship collapsed during the second part of 1989, but huge quantities of information had survived, much of it now held at the Berlin head office of the Stasi Records Agency in Berlin. For some reason Niemann was unable to get an appointment to come and look for information about her father till 1997, and the files that she found were disappointing. The papers she was given appeared to be hastily fabricated and trivial. She began a more structured research exercise, starting by obtaining copies of her father's birth and death certificates. She started with what she knew, about his time at university studying Botany and Economics first in Berlin and then at Greifswald. She knew he had belonged to the same student fraternities at university as his brothers, father and grandfather. She knew he had joined a Freikorps but had very little idea what a Freikorps was. Researching and reading round what she did know she was able to build her knowledge, early on coming across references to Bruno Sattler having been based in Belgrade at some stage during the war. Investigating further, she found a book about Serbia during the war by a historian called Walter Manoschek. The book's title, horrifyingly, was "Serbien ist judenfrei" ("Serbia is Free of Jews"). She found her father's name in the index and quickly discovered that one of his first administrative tasks, on his arrival in Belgrade, had involved arranging the provision from Berlin of a "Gas van" in order to kill the remaining Jews in the local concentration camp. These were mostly the wives and children of men who had already been killed or deported. According to Manoschek there were around 8,500 of them, although other sources give different numbers. Bruno Sattler had been responsible for preparing, organising and directing the mass killing. When she read this she believed it. The shock caused her to telephone her daughter with the news, although she herself would remember nothing of that. She probably went for long walks in the woods around Berlin. She was later told by friends and family that she had "disappeared from circulation" for several weeks. She seems never to have read the book on the Freikorps from cover to cover. Following up the index links to her father's name had been enough. The shock of the discovery seems never to have left her, but her determination to find out more about her father, and about any other atrocities in which he might have been involved, only intensified.

She wrote again to the Stasi Records Agency. This time she wrote not as the daughter of Bruno Sattler but as a historian undertaking research to reconstruct a biography. The effect in respect of the documents presented to her was transformational, not just at the Stasi Records Agency but also at the National Archives in Washington D.C., the Russian State Archive in Moscow, the National Archive of Serbia in Belgrade and Yad Vashem, the Holocaust Remembrance Center on the edge of Jerusalem She was able to build up a large store of knowledge about her father's past and, in particular, about his war-time past. A critical moment came when she found a photograph of her father standing next to a Soviet tank and wearing an SS uniform. Her mother had always sworn to her that Bruno Sattler had never worn an SS uniform: yet this picture had a note in her mother's handwriting on the reverse of it. Beate Niemann was driven on in her researches by a powerful combination of motives, including an overwhelming conviction that the truths she was uncovering deserved to be confronted without compromise. Another underlying strand was an angry indignation that came with the growing realisation of the extent to which her mother had repeatedly lied to her about her own father's actions during the war. The decision to make Bruni Sattler's story public came in 2000 after she contacted the newspaper Tagesspiegel to enquire of they had any relevant information in the newspaper's archives. A journalist from the paper telephoned her and quizzed her at length about her project. That was followed by a lengthy period of silence, at the end of which she received a long article about her father and her own researches. It was accompanied by a request that she identify and correct any inaccuracies and an assurance that if the article as corrected contained anything wrong or inappropriate. After a further long period of silence Niemann agreed to the article's publication. It appeared in Tagesspiegel in December 2000. There has followed further press exposure and a television documentary film by Yoash Tatari who had accompanied her and filmed her research work for a year during 2003. Her own book on the topic, "Mein guter Vater: Meine Leben mit seiner Vergangenheit", was published initially in 2005. Expanded and updated versions have appeared more recently.

In some ways Beate Niemann's almost obsessive determine to find and share the truth about her father has taken over her life. The impact is not all positive. She broke off relations with her mother as early as 1978 and subsequently lost all contact with her two elder sisters, both of whom "sided with her mother". Regarding friends' reactions to the publicity her project has generated, she has told an interviewer that there are roughly three equal cohorts. A third of her former friends were appalled and shunned her. Another third would be happy to meet up for a cinema visit or a coffee, but took care never to ask her what she was doing, for fear that she might tell them. That left a final third who supported her courage and commitment, welcoming the public impact of her work.
