= Berta Daniel =

German photographer and political activist (1896-1981)

- Born: Berta Dick; 20 November 1896; Ulm, Württemberg, Germany
- Died: 7 April 1981 (aged 84); East Berlin, German Democratic Republic
- Occupations: Photographer; Political activist Agent and Encryption specialist (Comintern)
- Political party: KPD; SED
- Spouse: Richard Daniel (1891-1942)
- Children: Lore Rutz (1920-2010)
- Parent(s): Robert Dick (1851-1928); Wilhelmine
- Awards: Patriotic Order of Merit

Berta Daniel (born Berta Dick: 20 November 1896 – 7 April 1981) was a German photographer and political activist (KPD).

During the 1920s and 1930s, she worked for the illegal News Service of the Communist Party in Germany and for the Comintern as an "agent". In 1937, while in Moscow, she fell victim to the Stalin purges and was sentenced to eight years (subsequently increased) detention in a camp. She survived, but it was only in 1957 that she was rehabilitated and able to return to what had by now become the Soviet sponsored German Democratic Republic.

== Life ==
Berta Dick was born in Ulm. She was her parents' youngest recorded child: her six elder siblings were all brothers, however. Her father, Robert Dick (1851–1928) was a master tailor and a prominent local politician. By the time of her birth he was a social democrat city councillor in Ulm. Back in 1875 he had been a delegate at the congress in Gotha which had agreed the unification of the General German Workers' Association ("Allgemeiner Deutscher Arbeiter-Verein" / ADAV) and the Social Democratic Workers' Party ("Sozialdemokratische Arbeiterpartei Deutschlands" / SDAP), paving the way for the creation of the unified Social Democratic Party. It is apparent that, unlike her six elder brothers, she inherited her father's political passion.

After she left school she learned about photography from her brother. In 1914 she joined the "Young Workers" ("Arbeiterjugend"). In 1916 she became a member of the Spartacus league which had started as an anti-war group within the Social Democratic Party, but was now emerging as an independent left-wing anti-war movement. In 1919 she joined the Young Free Socialists ("Freie sozialistische Jugend") and in 1923 the recently launched Communist Party of Germany.

Meanwhile, in 1919 she had married the architect, originally from Stuttgart, Richard Daniel, a man who co-founded the local (Ulm) branch of the Communist Party at the end of 1919. Their daughter, Lore (1920–2010), was born in Ulm on 17 May 1920.

=== Agent ===
Berta Daniel was, from its beginning, a member of the AM-Apparat, an illegal Communist Party intelligence service which existed in Germany till 1937. By Autumn 1923 she was also responsible for administering party finances in the Stuttgart and Munich regions.

The times were troubled. Richard Daniel was arrested in Ulm on 1 September 1923 and detained for preparing a military insurrection. He was released after three months and returned to Stuttgart. Then in February 1924 Berta Daniel was arrested in Ulm. While she was in prison her husband came to visit her with their four-year-old daughter, Lore, who was permitted to give her the orange they had brought for her. According to her later recollections, Lore then delighted her parents by asking the supervising prison guard if she might sing a little song to her mother. The child, who was already well steeped in the culture of radical socialism, then discomforted prison officials by singing all the verses of "Brüder, zur Sonne, zur Freiheit" ("Brothers, to the Sun, to Freedom"), a popular revolutionary song of the time. Berta Daniel was released after her father provided a guarantee on her behalf, and "went underground", living illegally (i.e. unregistered) in Berlin and other cities, while their daughter stayed with their father until he was arrested because of his own activities, after which she was sent to a children's home run by International Red Aid ("Internationale Rote Hilfe" / "Международная организация помощи борцам революции" IRH/МОПР), a Soviet sponsored workers' welfare operation. It was in Berlin that Berta Daniel worked between 1924 and 1930 for the (illegal) central European head office of the (illegal in Germany) IRH operation. Comrades with whom she worked in the IRH included Lenin's former assistant, Elena Stasova, and her fellow "AM-Apparat" member, Eugen Schönhaar. In 1928 it was possible for her daughter to join her. They lived discretely for a time with fellow extremists Erich and Zenzl Mühsam in the Mühsam's apartment on the south side of central Berlin.

In December 1931 the couple and their daughter relocated to the Soviet Union where they settled in Moscow. During the first part of the decade, till 1935, Berta Daniel was employed as an archivist in Moscow. She combined this with a covert senior role - probably involving responsibility for encryption - with the Comintern's Intelligence agency, also identified as the Comintern International Liaison Department ("Отдел международных связей Коминтерна" ОМС/OMS). The work involved a significant amount of foreign travel. Towards the end of 1935 she was arrested and sentenced in Vienna for a passport infringement. On her release a year later, she returned to Moscow in December 1936.

The Soviet capital was by now the scene of a major and sustained purge of actual and presumed enemies of the leadership, with intelligence workers and foreigners particularly vulnerable to denunciation. Berta Daniel was arrested by the NKVD in March 1937. She faced trial on 19 November 1937 and was sentenced to eight years in a labour camp. Richard Daniel, who worked in Moscow as a building engineer, would be arrested in February 1938 and die in a labour camp at Kotlas in June 1942. Her daughter, now aged 21, was able to pay her a two-hour visit in 1940. During 1942 Berta Daniel faced another trial, in Novosibirsk. Details are sparse, but the trial concluded with a sentence lasting an additional ten years. She was released in Tayshet at the end of 1952 after spending 15 years and 9 months in a succession of labour camps and other centres of detention between Moscow and Vladivostok. She was forcibly persuaded to remain in Tayshet. At some stage, however, she was able to obtain permission to go and live with her daughter, who had grown up while Berta Daniel was in the labour camps, and was now living in Kazan in Tatarstan, still a considerable distance to the east of Moscow.

One member of the intelligence community who had not fallen foul of the Stalin purges was Elena Stasova, with whom Daniel had worked at the IRH in the 1920s. Joseph Stalin died in March 1953, and in October 1953 Daniel wrote a letter to Stasova which the latter received, even though it was simply addressed to "Elena Stasova, Moscow city". It appears that it was as a result of their ensuing communication that on 28 January 1957 Richard Daniel was posthumously rehabilitated by the appropriate Moscow military tribunal. A couple of months later, on 26 March 1957, Berta Daniel, still very much alive, was rehabilitated by the same Moscow tribunal.

Berta Daniel and her daughter arrived from the Soviet Union in the German Democratic Republic on 27 June 1957. She now made her home in East Berlin. She lost little time in joining the young country's unchallenged ruling party, the Socialist Unity Party ("Sozialistische Einheitspartei Deutschlands" / SED). It is believed that release from Soviet exile for Berta and Lore Daniel had been made possible because of the support of Elena Stasova.

=== Honors ===
In 1969 she was honoured, receiving Germany's Patriotic Order of Merit in bronze. Berta Daniel died in East Berlin on 7 April 1981.
