= Armed Insurrection =

Guerrilla or insurgent warfare manual

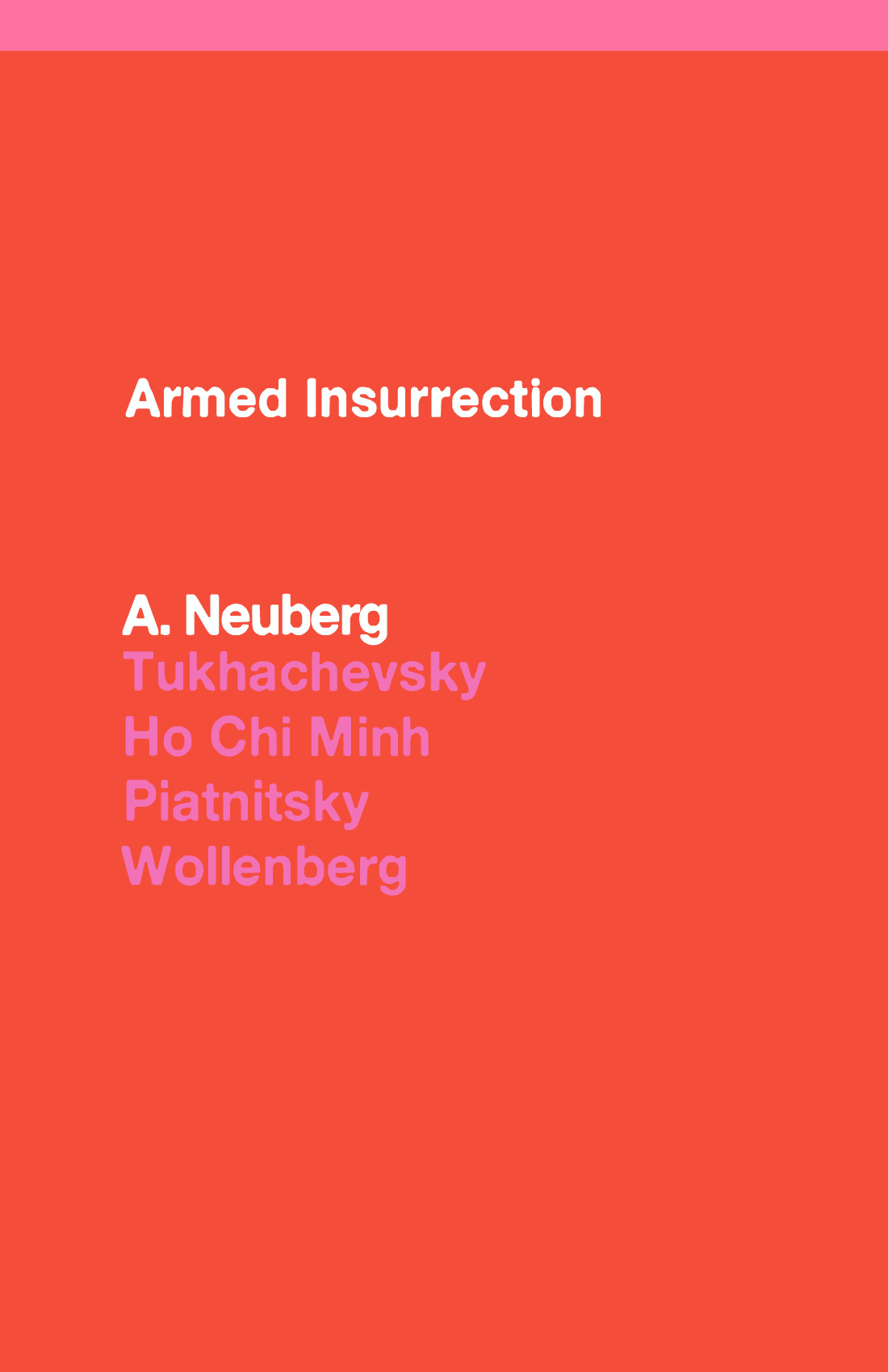
- Cover of the first English edition, 1970, NLB
- Author: A. Neuberg (pseudonym)
- Original title: Der bewaffnete Aufstand
- Language: German
- Genre: Military manual, historical, political
- Publication date: 1928

Armed Insurrection (German: Der bewaffnete Aufstand) is a book published by the Comintern in Germany under the pseudonym of A. Neuberg, written as a kind of textbook on the theory of organizing an armed insurrection.

The book was prepared by an instructor of the military apparatus of the Kommunistische Partei Deutschlands ("Communist Party of Germany", KPD) and an agent of the intelligence department of the Red Army, August Gailis. It was originally published in German ("Der bewaffnete Aufstand", 1928), followed three years later by translations into French ("L'insurrection armée", 1931) and Russian ("Вооружённое восстание", 1931). In 1932, Spanish Trotskyists published a Spanish translation without the knowledge of the Comintern.

== Contents and significance ==
Armed Insurrection deals with theory, practice and historical examples relating to an insurgent force that attempts to take definitive control of a territory – for example a city – by conquering arsenals, barracks, police stations, telecommunication centers, administrative centers, factories, railway stations, bridges, roads, etc. and then defending them from a possible enemy counterattack.

Friedrich Engels, considering the revolutionary events of 1848 in Germany, described the passage from armed rebellion to the formation of a real revolutionary army, thus raising the question – extremely relevant for radical left-wing politics between the second half of the 19th century and the first third of the 20th century – of the transformation of spontaneous popular uprisings into armed forces capable of organized opposition to power. Armed Insurrection is a further development of this theme, which makes the book extremely interesting from the point of view of understanding the ideas spread among the leaders of the Comintern about armed insurrection, considered as the highest and "supreme form" of political struggle of the proletariat against the state power of the bourgeoisie, to be "conducted according to the rules of military science", so that "it presupposes a plan of campaign, offensive fighting operations and unbounded devotion and heroism on the part of the proletariat". The book Armed Insurrection was written at a time when the leadership of the Third International (Comintern) and the Soviet Communist Party considered it possible to implement the idea of world revolution in the form of armed insurrections in individual countries.

According to Jörg Hülsmann, Armed Insurrection was probably the first systematic study of the suitability of guerrilla methods for establishing communist states.

Michael Hardt and Antonio Negri evaluated Armed Insurrection as follows:

This remarkable book, originally published in German in 1928, gives a rare inside view of communist military strategy in the early twentieth century.

== Authorship ==
In 1933, a book by Nazi propagandist Adolf Erth was published, translated into many European languages, titled: "Armed Insurrection: Revelations of the Communist Coup Attempt on the Eve of the National Revolution", in which it was claimed that Neuberg was the pseudonym of a major figure in the German communist movement, Heinz Neumann. Erth's version became generally accepted in the anti-communist literature of the 1950s and 1960s, being repeated in dozens of books, including in the memoirs of Chiang Kai-shek.

In 1970 in Italy and England, and in 1971 in Germany, three new editions of Neuberg's book were published, accompanied by introductory notes by former Comintern figure Erich Wollenberg, in which he named the "real authors" of the book: himself, as well as Vasily Blyukher, Hans Kippenberger, Osip Piatnitsky, Palmiro Togliatti, Mikhail Tukhachevsky, Józef Unszlicht, Ho Chi Minh, and Manfred Stern.

This version has remained generally accepted, even though in the 1990s Comintern documents were published, according to which the real author of the book was the Soviet agent August Gailis ("Neuberg" was his pseudonym during his clandestine work in Germany), probably aided by Tuure Lehén (an important Finnish communist and later Finnish-Soviet politician, as well as a philosopher, journalist and historian).

== Structure ==
Overall, the contents of Armed Insurrection are organized according to the following general index:

- Introduction
- 1. The Second International and Insurrection
- 2. Bolshevism and Insurrection
- 3. The Reval Uprising
- 4. The Hamburg Uprising
- 5. The Canton Insurrection
- 6. The Shanghai Insurrections
- 7. Communist Activity to Subvert the Armed Forces of the Ruling Classes
- 8. The Organization of the Proletariat's Armed Forces
- 9. The Direction of the Party's Military Work
- 10. The Character of Military Action at the Beginning of the Insurrection
- 11. The Character of the Insurgents' Operations during the Insurrection
- 12. The Party's Military Work among the Peasants

The work has maps and diagrams.

== Publication history ==
An English language edition was published by New Left Books (now Verso Books) in 1970. Verso republished the book in 2016.

== See also ==
- Third Period
- Guerrilla warfare
- Guerrilla Warfare (Che Guevara book)
- Insurrection
- La Salute è in voi!
- Minimanual of the Urban Guerrilla
- The Anarchist Cookbook
- TM 31-210 Improvised Munitions Handbook
- Antimilitärischer Apparat
