= Justice Daniel (disambiguation) =

Justice Daniel refers to Peter V. Daniel (1784–1860), associate justice of the Supreme Court of the United States. Justice Daniel may also refer to:

- Joseph J. Daniel (1784–1848), associate justice of the North Carolina Supreme Court
- Price Daniel (1910–1988), justice of the Texas Supreme Court
- William Daniel (judge) (1806–1873), associate justice of the Virginia Supreme Court of Appeals

== See also ==
- Judge Daniel (disambiguation)
- Justice Daniels (disambiguation)
