= David Daniel =

David Daniel may refer to:

- David Daniel (politician) (1903–1962), member of the Queensland Legislative Assembly
- David Daniel (rugby union) (1871–1948), Welsh rugby union forward
- David E. Daniel (born 1949), Deputy Chancellor of the University of Texas System
