= General Daniel =

General Daniel may refer to:

- Hector Daniel (1898–1953), South African Air Force brigadier general
- Junius Daniel (1828–1864), Confederate States Army brigadier general
- Richard Daniel (1900–1986), German Wehrmacht major general

== See also ==
- Charles Daniell (1827–1889), British Army major general
- Jody J. Daniels (fl. 1980s–2020s), U.S. Army lieutenant general
- Attorney General Daniel (disambiguation)
