= Judge Daniel =

Judge Daniel may refer to:

- George B. Daniels (born 1953), judge of the United States District Court for the Southern District of New York
- Jeremy C. Daniel (born 1978), judge of the United States District Court for the Northern District of Illinois
- Peter V. Daniel (1784–1860), judge of the United States District Court for the Eastern District of Virginia prior to his appointment to the Supreme Court of the United States
- Wiley Young Daniel (1946–2019), judge of the United States District Court for the District of Colorado

== See also ==
- Justice Daniel (disambiguation)
