= South Hanover–Braunschweig =

Former constituency of the Reichstag (Weimar Republic)

16 South Hanover–Braunschweig Südhannover–Braunschweig
- Former electoral constituency for the Reichstag
- Location within the Weimar Republic
- State: Braunschweig & Prussia
- Province: Hanover
- Electorate: 1,093,287 (1919); 1,384,552 (1933)
- Major settlements: Hanover, Hildesheim, Göttingen, Goslar, Hameln

Former constituency
- Created: 1920
- Abolished: 1938

South Hanover–Braunschweig was one of the 35 electoral districts (German: Wahlkreise) used to elect members to the Reichstag during the Weimar Republic. It sent members to the Reichstag in eight democratic elections between 1920 and 1933. It existed nominally in the show elections to the Nazi Reichstag until 1938.

It was located in northwestern Germany and comprised the contemporary Regierungsbezirke of Hanover and Hildesheim from the Prussian province of Hanover, as well as the Free State of Braunschweig. It was constituency 16 in the numbering scheme.

== Electoral system ==
The constituency was created for the 1920 election, following the redrawing of districts in the Hanover/Hamburg region. Under the proportional representation electoral system of the Weimar Republic, voters cast a vote for party lists. Parties were awarded a seat for every 60,000 votes in a constituency. Excess votes were aggregated at two higher levels of seat distribution: an intermediate level combining multiple constituencies, where extra seats were awarded to parties' constituency lists, and a national level where seats were awarded to national lists of each party or alliance.

== Results (1919–1933) ==
=== Vote share ===
Party	1919 (Note: Notional results on 1920 boundaries.)	1920	1924 I	1924 II	1928	1930	1932 I	1932 II	1933
KPD		0.4	8.2	4.6	3.5	5.5	8.2	10.7	7.5
USPD	8.0	19.2	1.0	0.3	0.1				
SPD	43.4	28.0	30.0	35.6	45.6	39.4	31.5	31.0	27.9
DDP	13.4	5.3	4.4	4.9	3.8	3.0	0.8	0.7	0.6
Centre	9.3	5.0	4.8	5.2	4.6	4.7	4.9	4.7	4.6
DHP	9.3	13.2	13.8	12.0	7.7	4.9	1.2	1.7	1.2
DVP	8.2	20.6	13.4	15.7	13.3	6.7	1.3	2.2	1.3
WP					3.2	2.7	0.1	0.1	
DNVP	2.4	8.0	15.1	17.6	9.2	5.3	5.1	7.4	7.6
Nazi			7.6	3.4	4.4	24.3	46.1	40.6	48.7
Other	5.9	0.1	1.7	0.6	4.8	3.5	0.8	0.3	0.5
Turnout	87.7	86.4	83.9	82.6	81.5	86.9	89.6	87.1	92.2
Source: Wahlen in Deutschland

=== Deputies ===
Election	Distribution	Seats
1920		15
May 1924		15
Dec 1924		16
1928		15
1930		18
Jul 1932		18
Nov 1932		18
1933		19
Source: Wahlen in Deutschland
