= Attorney General Daniel =

Attorney General Daniel may refer to:

- John Reeves Jones Daniel (1802–1868), Attorney General of North Carolina
- Price Daniel (1910–1988), Attorney General of Texas

== See also ==
- Dustin McDaniel (born 1972), Attorney General of Arkansas
- General Daniel (disambiguation)
