= Wallace L. Daniel =

American historian

Wallace L. Daniel Jr. is an American historian, currently the Provost and a Distinguished University Professor at Mercer University. Previously, Daniel was the Ralph L. and Mae Lynn Professor of History at Baylor University and the Dean of Baylor's College of Arts and Sciences from 1996 to 2005.

== Education ==
- Ph.D. in History, University of North Carolina
- B.A. in Economics, with Honors, University of North Carolina
- Slavic Languages Institute, Indiana University (2 times)
