= Eugen Schönhaar =

German political activist (1898–1934)

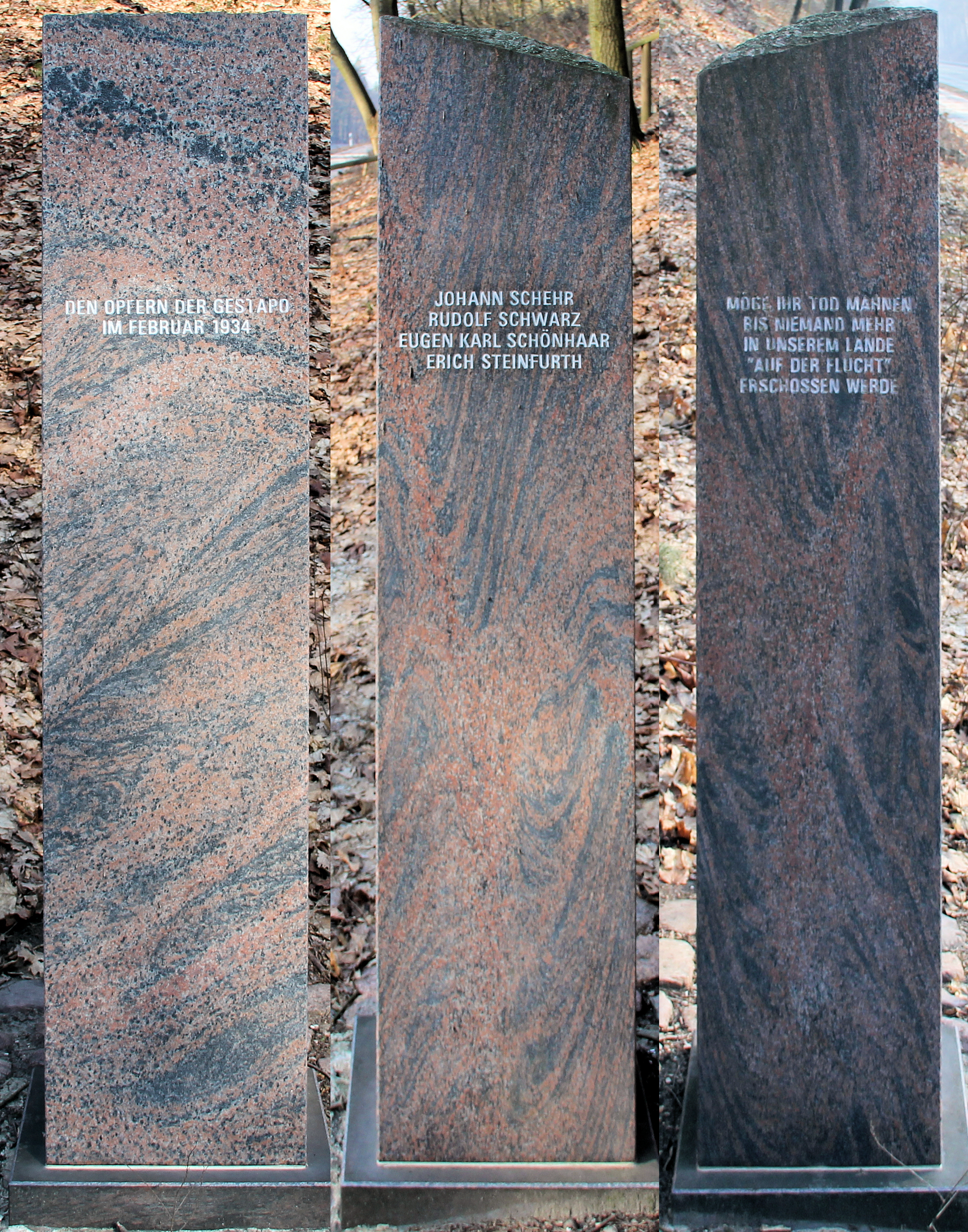
- This memorial marks the spot where Eugen Schönhaar and his three comrades were shot dead by Bruno Sattler of the Gestapo
- Born: 29 October 1898; Esslingen am Neckar, Germany
- Died: 1/2 February 1934; Schäferberg / Kilometerberg (hill), Berlin-Wannsee, Germany
- Occupations: Skilled factory worker Communist political activist Communist Party official Resistance activist
- Political party: Spartacus League; KPD
- Spouse: Odette Pisler (m. 1924)
- Children: Karl "Carlo" Schönhaar (1924–1942)

Eugen Schönhaar (29 October 1898 – 1 February 1934) was a German political activist (KPD) who became a resistance activist after the National Socialists took power. He died when he was one of four men shot by Gestapo officials, reportedly while escaping during an overnight transport following arrest. He and his three murdered comrades were rescued from anonymity thanks to a poem by Erich Weinert entitled "John Schehr und Genossen".

== Biography ==
Eugen Schönhaar was born at Esslingen am Neckar, a prosperous industrial town to the east of Stuttgart. His father was a skilled industrial worker. Schönhaar completed an apprenticeship which prepared him to follow in his father's footsteps. In 1912, the year of his fourteenth birthday, he joined the Young Workers' movement ("Arbeiterjugendbewegung"). During the war which broke out in July 1914 he joined the anti-war Spartacus League. In 1916 he was arrested and sentenced to three months imprisonment because he had spoken out against the continuing war. In Autumn/Fall 1917, around the time of his nineteenth birthday, he was conscripted for military service.

War ended late in 1918 and as the defeated armies made their way home, at the start of 1919 Schönhaar returned home. During the ensuing months of revolution the anti-war Spartacus League disappeared, but many of its members, inspired by events in Moscow two years earlier, now founded the Communist Party of Germany, formally launched at a three day conference held at Berlin between 30 December 1918 and 1 January 1919. The party leaders were assassinated by conservative paramilitaries (with government backing) a couple of weeks later, but the Communist Party endured and Eugen Schönhaar, who had found work in an Esslingen engineering plant, joined it. He also became chairman of the local Young Socialists.

In December 1920 Schönhaar took part in the fifth national congress of the Young Communists and was elected to join the party's national head office team. Till May 1921 he served as an editor of the party journal, "Die junge Garde". In July 1921 and again in December 1922 he travelled to Moscow as a German delegate to the Young Communist International (YCI) second and third congresses and was elected to membership of the Executive Committee of the international organisation. For some time he worked in the YCI's Berlin office. Then after the Moscow congress in December 1922 he remained in the Soviet Union for approximately one and a half years, supporting himself by applying the factory skills that he had acquired in Esslingen. From the latter part of 1923 he was employed with the Executive Committee of International Red Aid ("Междунаро́дная организа́ция по́мощи борца́м револю́ции" / МОПР / IRA) an international Moscow-backed workers' political welfare organisation. He returned to Berlin in May 1924.

It was also in 1924 that he married Odette, the daughter of a longstanding militant communist originally from Lausanne. She had been working as a typist-secretary for L'Humanité, the Paris based communist daily newspaper in 1922 when she had relocated to Berlin to join the large Communist International (Comintern) operation in the city. Her politics were aligned with her husbands, and during their ten year marriage she appears to have shared the itinerant lifestyle to which his political activism led.

In Berlin he headed up the Central Europe office ("Mitteleuropäischen Büros" / MEB) of the IRA. He was also actively involved with the AM-Apparat, a consciously misleadingly named intelligence service that operated under the direction of the Communist Party. It was through this connection that he learned that he faced the risk of arrest: in 1927 he therefore went back to Moscow where he resumed his work for the Executive Committee of the IRA. In July 1928 this organisation sent him to the United States of America where he "continued with his illegal activity" In 1929 he returned to Germany, where politics were becoming increasingly polarised.

He was now employed in the secretariat of the Party Central Committee: his responsibilities included the printing of illegal reading matter. By 1932 German politics had become not merely polarised but deadlocked. The Communists and National Socialists between them won a majority of parliamentary seats in the July election, but would not enter into a governing coalition together, and the more moderate political parties were for the most part determined not to collaborate with the extremists. In January 1933 the National Socialists were able to take power. The new Hitler government lost no time in transforming the country into a one-party dictatorship. Political activity (except in support of the government) became illegal. In the aftermath of the Reichstag fire it quickly became clear that the Communists filled the top positions on the governments' targets list. Many fled abroad during March while many others were arrested. Eugen Schönhaar continued to be politically active in Berlin, though by February 1933 he was identifying himself under the pseudonym, "Ewald Rackwitz". He worked (illegally) for a party leadership team ("Inlandsleitung") under John Schehr.

On 11 November 1933 Eugen Schönhaar was arrested, along with fellow party activists John Schehr and Rudolf Schwarz. During the night of 1/2 February 1934 these three, together with Erich Steinfurth (who had been arrested back in March 1933) were shot dead at the Schäferberg / Kilometerberg (hill) on the edge of Berlin by Gestapo personnel, allegedly "while attempting to escape". In reality the murder was an act of quick retribution following the shooting the previous day of the government spy Alfred Kattner.

== The orphan and the widow ==
Eugen Schönhaar's son, Carlo Schönhaar (1924–1942), was also opposed to the National Socialists. After his father's arrest he escaped to Lausanne in francophone Switzerland where he stayed with his maternal grand parents. They were joined by his mother shortly after his father's murder. Threatened by the authorities with being sent back to Germany, they moved on, like many of Germany's political exiles, to France where he was able to attend school, in the south of the country, despite the fact that he and his mother were illegal immigrants. By 1941 mother and son were in Paris, which since June 1940 had been in the occupied north of France. In 1941 Carlo was excluded from his Paris secondary school on account of his "political activities". He had been involved in a strike or in distributing political leaflets. At around this time - if not earlier - he joined the Résistance. His career as a resistance fighter came to an end on 8 March 1942 when he was arrested immediately after leaving a suitcase filled with explosives outside the Salle Wagram which had been hosting an anti-Soviet propaganda exhibition ("Le Bolchevisme contre l’Europe"). A court martial show trial was conducted by the German occupation authorities in Paris between 7 and 14 April at which 25 of the 27 accused were condemned to death. The proceedings were apparently conducted according to German law, which precluded the death sentence for those under 18. Carlo Carlo Schönhaar was still only 17. Nevertheless, he was one of those condemned to death and was killed by firing squad, with the other 24 Résistance combattant comrades, on 17 April 1942 at Mont-Valérien.

Eugen Schönhaar's wife, born Odette Pisler, was originally Swiss. By marrying a German she had, under Swiss law, lost her Swiss citizenship which made it dangerous to remain in Switzerland. After moving with her son to France from her parents' home in Lausanne she too joined the Résistance: she was arrested on 9 March 1942 just one day after her son. She then spent 17 days in the Santé Prison on the south side of Paris followed by a further six months held in Gestapo detention in Berlin, from where she was deported to the Ravensbrück concentration camp in the damp flat countryside north of the German capital. Odette Schönhaar was among the camp survivors liberated by the Soviet army in April 1945. She may have returned to Paris after 1945 and worked again for the communist daily newspaper L'Humanité.

== The killer ==
Much later it was determined that the killer had been a police officer called Bruno Sattler. After the war and the Nazi nightmare were over, on 11 August 1947, with Berlin divided into military zones of occupation, a clandestine operation was undertaken from the Soviet occupation zone which involved the kidnapping from what was becoming known as "West Berlin" of Sattler, who was smuggled across to the east and secretly sentenced to life imprisonment. He was officially (but incorrectly) declared dead in 1949. Although Eugen Schönhaar and his three fellow victims became heroic figures in the Soviet occupation zone (relaunched in 1949 as the German Democratic Republic / "East Germany"), the kidnapping and sentencing of their killer never made it to the national schools curriculum. Sattler served his sentence and on 15 October 1972 died in prison, aged 74, under circumstances that were never entirely clear. His youngest daughter, who had been born in 1942 and with her family had escaped to West Germany after a final cuddle from her father in 1945, grew up convinced that her father was a good man. After reunification she was keen to press for his rehabilitation. She was able to undertake extensive research in the scrupulously maintained files that the East German security services had carefully compiled and maintained during the intervening decades, and forced to accept not just that her father was the man who had murdered "John Schehr" and his comrades, but that this had been just the first in a succession of escalating atrocities for which her father had been responsible during the twelve Nazi years during what was, in its own terms, a highly successful career as a senior Gestapo officer.

== Celebration ==
After the Second World War Eugen Schönhaar's earthly remains were disinterred and reburied in the "Gedenkstätte der Sozialisten" (area set aside for heroes of socialism)) in East Berlin's Central Cemetery.

Three memorial stones commemorating the killing of Schönhaar and his three fellow victims have stood on the spot where they were killed at the Schäferberg / Kilometerberg (hill) in Berlin-Wannsee since 1954.

A trawler was named "Eugen Schönhaar" during the early 1970s.

At least one street in Berlin has been named in his honour and in 2016 a Stolperstein was laid in the town of his birth, Esslingen, commemorating Eugen Schönhaar, alongside another commemorating his son who later also became a victim of the National Socialists.
