= Karl Retzlaw =

German politician (1896–1979)

Karl Retzlaw (10 February 1896 – 20 June 1979) was a German politician, representative of the Social Democratic Party, Independent Social Democratic Party of Germany and Communist Party of Germany.

Retzlaw was born Karl Gröhl in Schneidemühl, Province of Posen (today Pila, Poland) and died in Frankfurt.

== See also ==
- List of Social Democratic Party of Germany politicians
