= Patriotic Order of Merit =

Patriotic Order of Merit Vaterländischer Verdienstorden
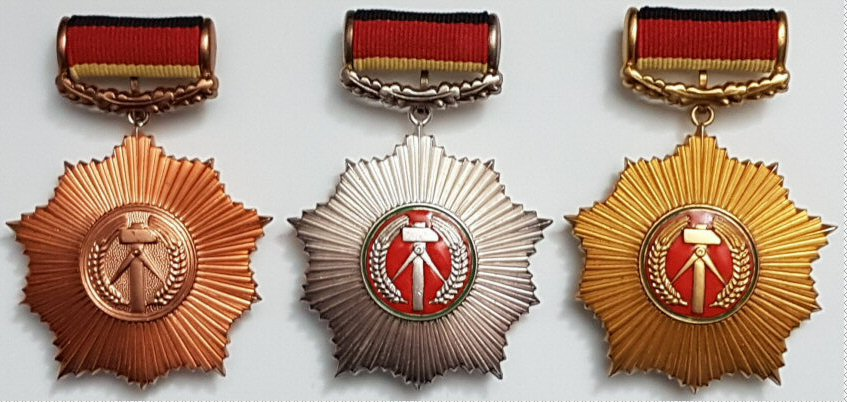
- The 3 classes of the Patriotic Order of Merit
- Awarded for: Special services to the state and to society
- Presented by: East Germany
- Status: No longer awarded
- Established: 21 May 1954
- Final award: 1 May 1989

Precedence
- Next (higher): Karl Marx Order
- Next (lower): Banner of Labour

The Patriotic Order of Merit (German: Vaterländischer Verdienstorden, or VVO) was a national award granted annually in the German Democratic Republic (GDR). It was founded in 1954 and was awarded to individuals and institutions for outstanding contributions to the state and society in various areas of life.

== Classes ==
- Honor clasp, in Gold
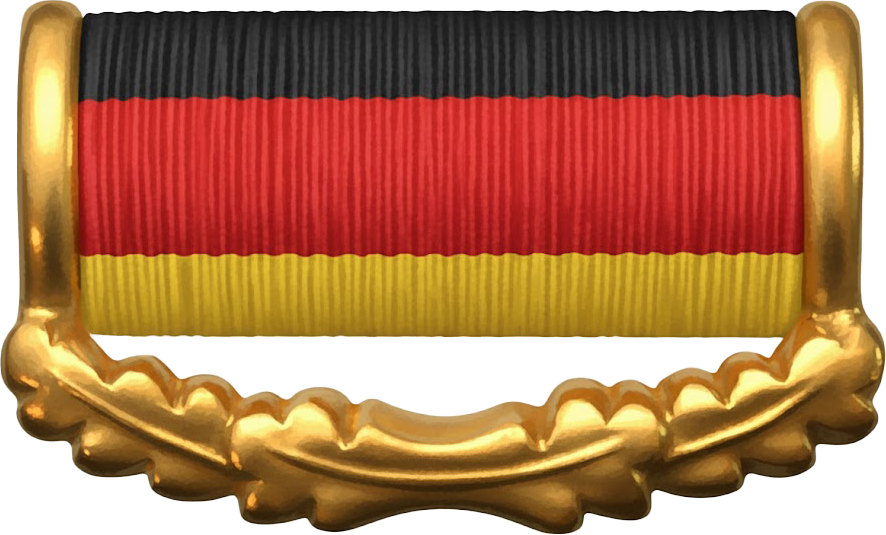
- Gold, 1st class
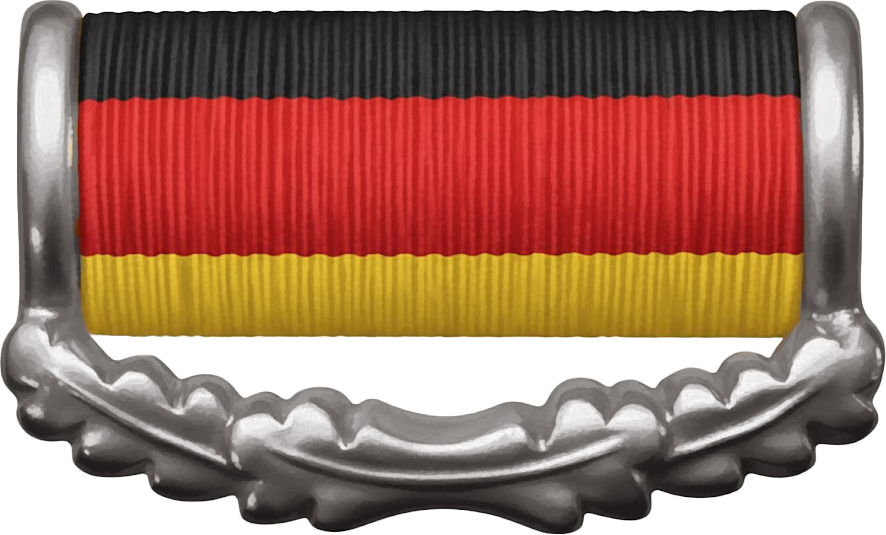
- Silver, 2nd class
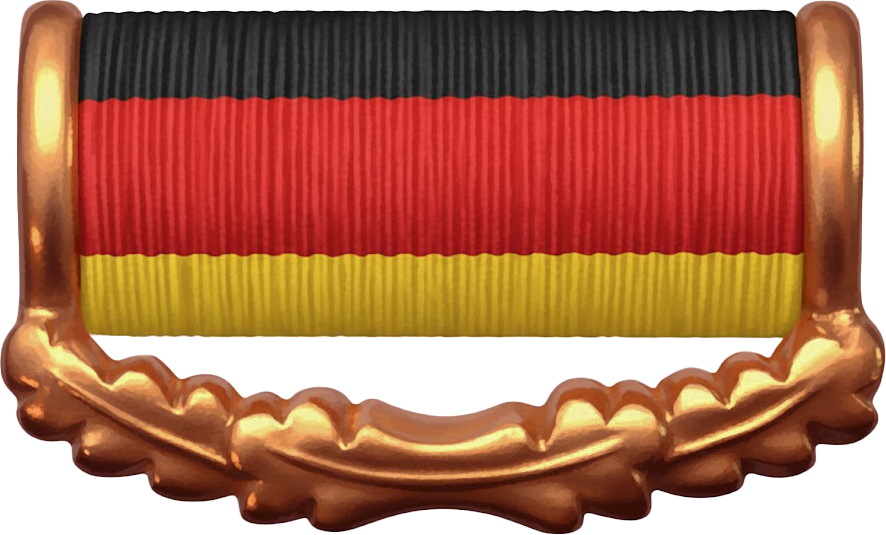
- Bronze, 3rd class

== The award ==
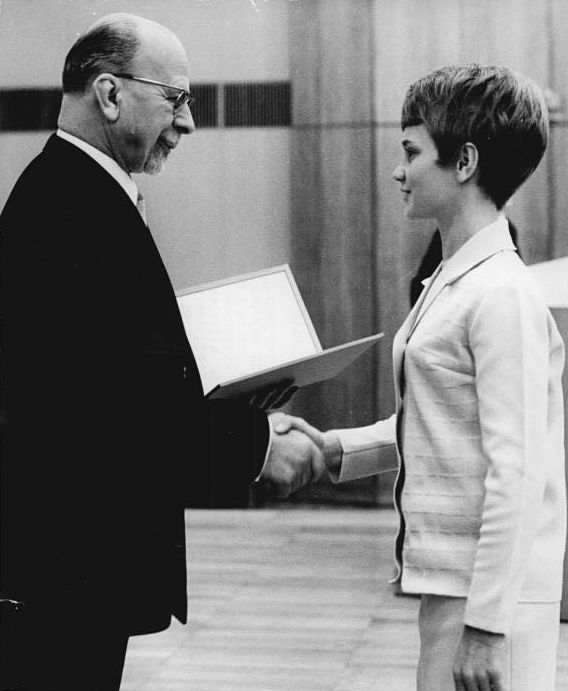
Party chief Walter Ulbricht awarding Karin Janz a silver Patriotic Order of Merit in 1968

The official language for the award stipulated it was given "for outstanding merit":

- "in the struggle of the German and international labor movement and in the fight against fascism,"
- "in the establishment, consolidation and fortification of the German Democratic Republic,"
- "in the fight to secure peace and advance the international influence of the German Democratic Republic".

The order was awarded in bronze, silver, gold and gold honor clasp (Ehrenspange) (for exceptional merit). Each level was only awarded once and with the exception of the recipient of the honor clasp, all recipients received a sum of money.

== Notable recipients ==
- Vasily Chuikov, Marshal of the Soviet Union
- Berta Daniel
- Vinzent Porombka, 1955
- Paula Hertwig, 1956
- Jan Petersen, 1958
- Klaus Köste, 1972
- Katarina Witt, 1984 (Gold) and 1988 (gold honor clasp)
- Klaus Fuchs

== See also ==
- Orders, decorations, and medals of East Germany
