= Bruno Beater =

German politician (1914–1982)

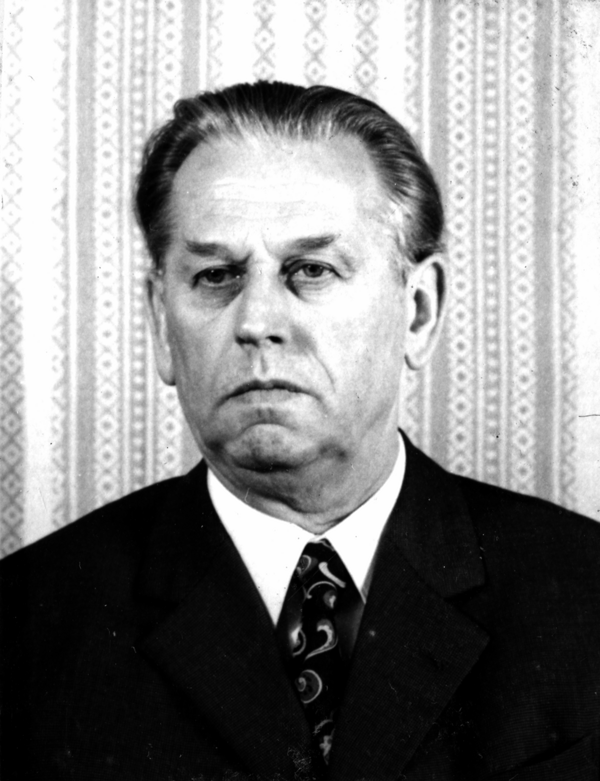
- Born: 5 February 1914
- Died: 9 April 1982 (aged 68)
- Occupations: Generaloberst; Stasi
- Political party: SED

Bruno Beater (5 February 1914 – 9 April 1982) was an East German intelligence officer and politician. He served as First Deputy Minister of State Security in the administrations of Walter Ulbricht and Erich Honecker.

== Biography ==
Born into a working family Berlin on 5 February 1914, Beater received vocational instruction in the 1920s and 1930s, taking part in the Young Communist League of Germany while growing up in the pre-Hitler era of Weimar German republic. He kept a low apolitical profile after Hitler's initiation of the Nazis' wide-scale persecution of German communists following his arrival at the helm of power in 1933. His main source of employment during the 1930s was work as a carpenter.

First drafted into the Wehrmacht during peacetime in 1936 and once more upon the outbreak of World War II, Beater defected to the Soviet side in 1944, at first doing work with the National Committee for a Free Germany to support the Soviet Union's war effort against the Nazi forces, then joining the Soviet Army, taking part in the campaign against Breslau (now Wrocław) during the last months of the war in 1945. Beater participated as an instructor in a de-Nazification program from May to October 1945.

Beater became a member of the Communist Party of Germany (KPD) during the years of post-war reconstruction in the Soviet-administered zone of divided Germany. Its merger with the Social Democratic Party in the Soviet-administered zone created the Socialist Unity Party of Germany (SED) in 1949. Beater joined the newly created Stasi's Berlin service in April 1950. His activity in this line of work included the organization of a "special operations group" for work in the West following a plan worked out with Josef Kiefel and Erich Mielke. Already a highly ranked Ministry deputy in the 1950s, Beater developed his intelligence career in the following decades, attaining the position of Mielke's deputy as First Deputy Minister in 1964 – a ministry role followed by his promotion to the lieutenant-general in 1965. Beater enthusiastically supported the development of electronic intelligence gathering in the late 1960s.

His political career saw his rise to full member of the SED's Central Committee in 1973, ten years after his first election to the committee as a candidate member. Beater was awarded the Karl Marx Order, East Germany's highest decoration, in 1974. He reached the rank of Generaloberst in 1980.

Beater died after a long period of illness in 1982.
