= Kiefel =

Kiefel is a surname. Notable people with the surname include:

- Josef Kiefel (1908–1999), anti-Nazi and East German counterintelligence chief
- Ron Kiefel (born 1960), American cyclist
- Russell Kiefel (1951–2016), Australian actor
- Susan Kiefel (born 1954), Australian jurist

== See also ==
- Kiefer
