= Erich Mielke =

East German secret police chief (1907–2000)

- Mielke in 1976

Minister for State Security
- In office 1 November 1957 – 7 November 1989
- Chairman of the Council of Ministers: Otto Grotewohl; Willi Stoph; Horst Sindermann; Willi Stoph
- First Deputy: Otto Walter; Bruno Beater
- Preceded by: Ernst Wollweber
- Succeeded by: Position abolished Wolfgang Schwanitz (as Head of the Office for National Security)

State Secretary in the Ministry for State Security (Note: In the aftermath of the uprising of 1953, the Ministry for State Security was punished by being demoted to a State Secretariat under the Ministry of the Interior before being reinstated as a Ministry in 1955. During its existence as State Secretariat, Mielke still served as second in command as Deputy State Secretary.)
- In office 8 February 1950 – 1 November 1957
- Minister: Wilhelm Zaisser; Ernst Wollweber
- Preceded by: Position established
- Succeeded by: Position abolished Otto Walter (as First Deputy Minister)
Volkskammer
Member of the Volkskammer
In office 3 December 1958 – 16 November 1989
Preceded by	multi-member district
Succeeded by	Ursula Schönburg
Constituency	Hohenmölsen, Naumburg, Weißenfels, Zeitz, №1

Personal details
- Born: Erich Fritz Emil Mielke; 28 December 1907 Wedding, Berlin, Kingdom of Prussia, German Empire (now Germany)
- Died: 21 May 2000 (aged 92) Neu-Hohenschönhausen, Berlin, Germany
- Party: Socialist Unity Party (1946–1989)
- Other political affiliations: Communist Party of Germany (1928–1946)
- Spouse: Gertrud Müller
- Children: Frank; Ingrid
- Occupation: Politician; Civil servant; Freight forwarder
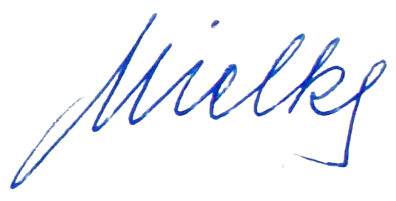
- Signature

Military service
- Allegiance: East Germany
- Branch/service: National People's Army
- Rank: Armeegeneral
- Battles/wars: Spanish Civil War; World War II
- Criminal information
- Status: Served prison sentence 7 December 1989 – 9 March 1990; 26 July 1990 (Note: Mielke was sentenced on 26 October 1993, but had been imprisoned in pre-trial detention from 7 December 1989 to 9 March 1990, when he was briefly released due to poor health, and from 26 July 1990 onward. In Germany, pre-trial detention counts towards the eventual time served.) – 1 August 1995, released on parole in 1995 due to poor health
- Convictions: Murder (2 counts), attempted murder
- Penalty: 6 years imprisonment
- Central institution membership: 1976–1989: Full member, Politburo of the Central Committee; 1971–1976: Candidate member, Politburo of the Central Committee; 1950–1989: Full member, Central Committee; Other offices held: 1960–1989: Member, National Defence Council; 1950–1989: First Chairman, SV Dynamo

Erich Fritz Emil Mielke (German: [ˈeːʁɪç ˈmiːlkə]; 28 December 1907 – 21 May 2000) was a German communist official who served as head of the East German Ministry for State Security (Ministerium für Staatsicherheit – MfS), better known as the Stasi, from 1957 until shortly after the fall of the Berlin Wall in 1989. Dubbed "The Master of Fear" (German: der Meister der Angst) by the West German press, Mielke was one of the most powerful, feared, and hated men in East Germany.

A working-class native of the Wedding slum district of Berlin and a second-generation member of the Communist Party of Germany, Mielke was one of two gunmen in the 1931 murders of Berlin Police captains Paul Anlauf and Franz Lenck. After learning that a witness had survived, Mielke escaped arrest by fleeing to the Soviet Union, where the NKVD recruited him. He was one of the key figures in the decimation of Moscow's many German Communist refugees during the Great Purge as well as in the Red Terror; the witch-hunt by the Servicio de Información Militar for both real and imagined members of the anti-Stalinist Left within the International Brigade during the Spanish Civil War.

Following the end of World War II in 1945, Mielke returned to the Soviet Zone of Occupied Germany, which he helped organize into a Marxist–Leninist satellite state under the Socialist Unity Party (SED). The Stasi under Mielke has been called by historian Edward Peterson the "most pervasive police state apparatus ever to exist on German soil". During the 1950s and 1960s, Mielke led the process of forcibly forming collectivised farms from East Germany's family-owned farms, which sent a flood of refugees to West Germany. In response, Mielke oversaw the 1961 construction of the Berlin Wall and co-signed standing orders for the Border Guards to use lethal force against all East Germans who attempted to commit "desertion of the Republic".

Throughout the Cold War, Mielke also oversaw the establishment of other pro-Soviet police states throughout the Third World. Mielke covertly trained and armed far-left guerrillas and militant organisations aimed at committing terrorist attacks and violent regime change in Western Europe, Latin America, Africa, Southeast Asia, and the Middle East. Due to his close ties to former dictator Mengistu Haile Mariam, John Koehler has accused Mielke and the Stasi military advisors he assigned to Ethiopia under the Derg of complicity in the Red Terror, genocide, and many other crimes against humanity.

Mielke, who joined the SED's ruling Politburo fairly late, was regarded as belonging to its pro-Moscow faction alongside Willi Stoph and Werner Krolikowski. During the later years of SED leader Erich Honecker's rule, Mielke was part of the small clique of Politburo members who made all consequential decisions on their own, alongside Joachim Herrmann and Günter Mittag. He was instrumental in the removal of both major SED leaders Walter Ulbricht and Honecker, partly motivated by their respective transgressions of Soviet policies.

After German reunification in 1990, Mielke was prosecuted, convicted, and imprisoned for the 1931 policemen's murders. A second murder trial for the 260 killings of defectors at the Inner German border was adjourned after Mielke was ruled not mentally competent to stand trial. Mielke was also charged, but never tried, with ordering two 1981 terrorist attacks by the Baader-Meinhof Group against United States military personnel in West Germany. Released from incarceration early due to ill health and senile dementia in 1995, Mielke died in a Berlin nursing home in 2000.

== Early life ==
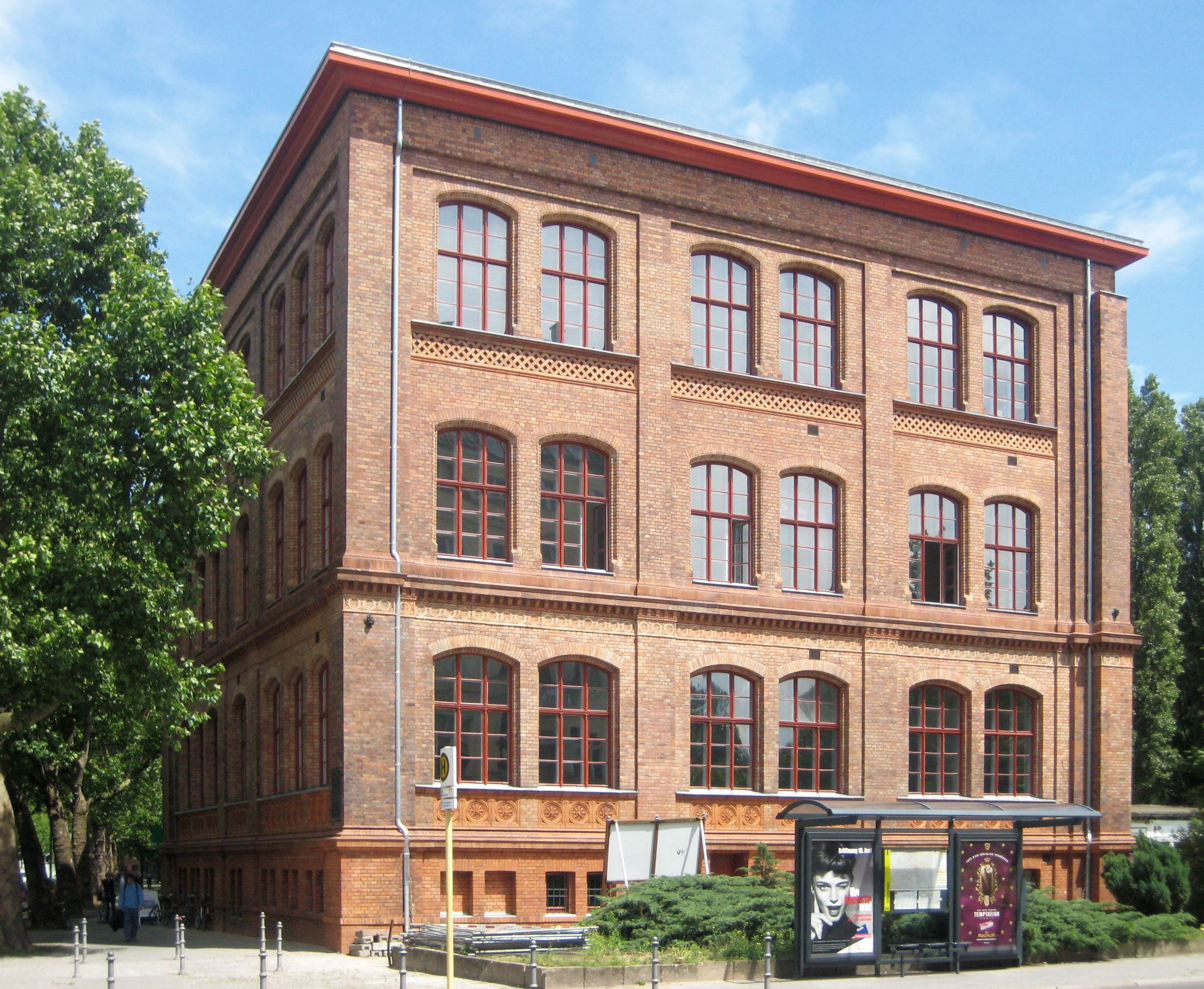
Köllnisches Gymnasium

Erich Mielke was born in a tenement in Berlin-Wedding, Brandenburg, on 28 December 1907. During the First World War, the neighborhood was known as "Red Wedding" due to many residents' Marxist militancy. In a handwritten autobiography written for the Soviet secret police, Mielke described his father as "a poor, uneducated woodworker," and said that his mother died in 1911. Both were, he said, members of the Social Democratic Party of Germany (SPD). After his remarriage to "a seamstress," the elder Mielke and his new wife joined the Independent Social Democratic Party of Germany and remained members when it was renamed the Communist Party of Germany (KPD). Erich claimed "My younger brother Kurt and two sisters were Communist sympathisers."

Despite his family's poverty, Mielke was sufficiently academically gifted to be awarded a free scholarship in the prestigious Köllnisches Gymnasium, but had to leave it a year later, for being "unable to meet the great demands of this school." While attending the Gymnasium, Mielke joined the Communist Party of Germany in 1925, and worked as a reporter for the communist newspaper Rote Fahne from 1928 to 1931.

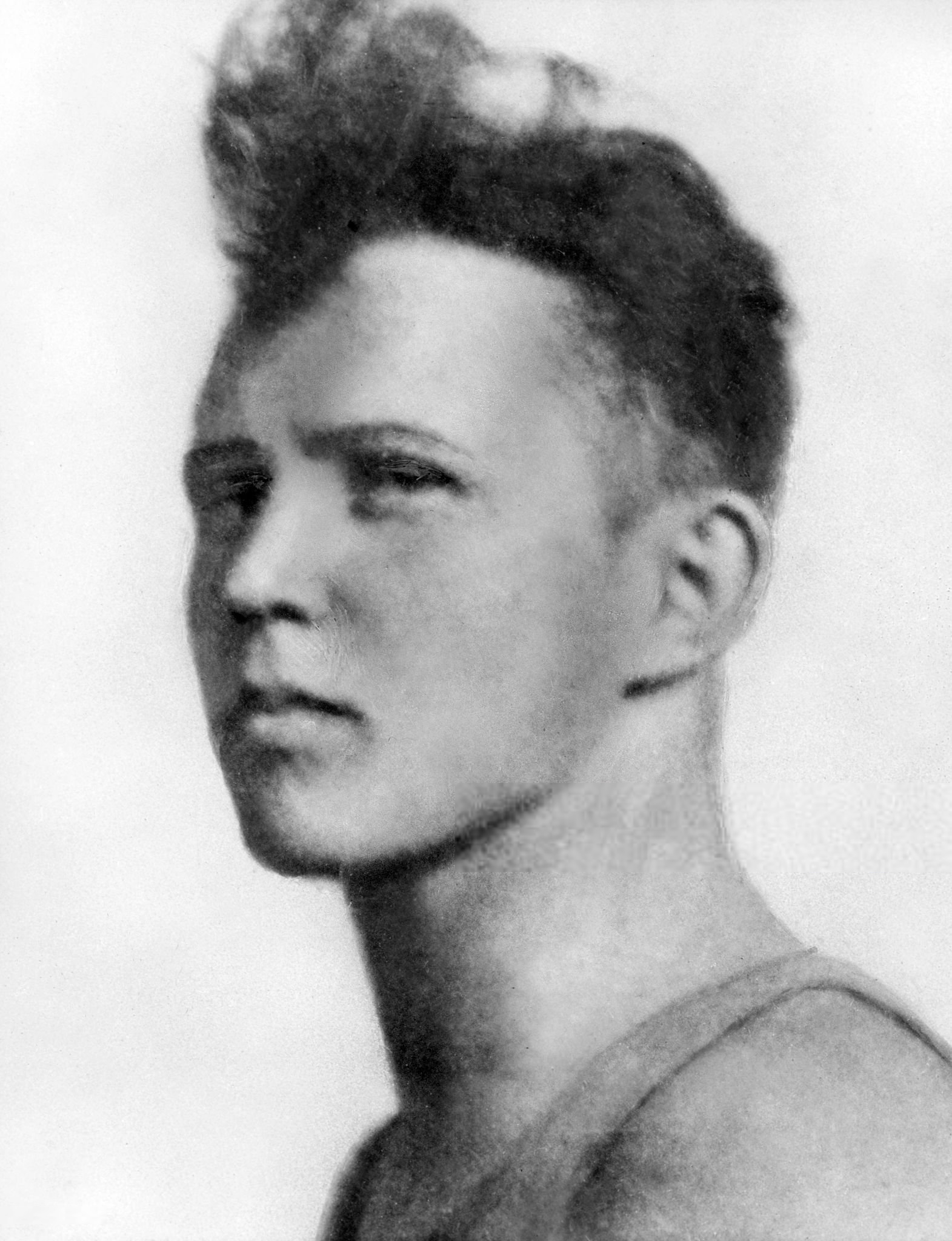
Mielke in 1927

Under the Weimar Republic, the KPD was the largest communist party in Europe and was seen as the "leading party" of the communist movement outside the Soviet Union. Under Ernst Thälmann's leadership, the KPD was completely obedient to Soviet General Secretary Joseph Stalin, and from 1928 the Party was both funded and controlled by the Comintern in Moscow.

Until the end of the Republic, the KPD viewed the Social Democratic Party of Germany (SPD), which dominated German politics between 1918 and 1931, as their mortal enemy. In keeping with Stalin's policy towards social democracy, the KPD considered all SPD members to be "social fascists". The KPD also believed that all other political parties were "fascist" and regarded itself as "the only anti-fascist Party" in Germany. Nevertheless, the KPD closely collaborated with the Nazi Party during the early 1930s and both Parties intended to replace the democratically elected government of the Weimar Republic with a totalitarian single party state.

Soon after joining the Party, Mielke joined the KPD's paramilitary wing, or Parteiselbstschutz ("Party Self Defense Unit"). It was a part of the Antimilitärischer Apparat, the party's clandestine intelligence service. At the time, the Parteiselbstschutz in Berlin was commanded by KPD Reichstag Deputies Hans Kippenberger and Heinz Neumann.

According to John Koehler, "Mielke was a special protege of Kippenberger's having taken to his paramilitary training with the enthusiasm of a Prussian Junker. World War I veterans taught the novices how to handle pistols, rifles, machine guns, and hand grenades. This clandestine training was conducted in the sparsely populated, pastoral countryside surrounding Berlin. Mielke also pleased Kippenberger by being an exceptional student in classes on the arts of conspiratorial behavior and espionage, taught by comrades who had studied at the secret M-school of the GRU in Moscow."

According to John Koehler, members of the Parteiselbstschutz "served as bouncers at Party meetings and specialized in cracking heads during street battles with political enemies." Besides the ruling SPD and its paramilitary Reichsbanner forces, the arch-enemies of the Parteiselbstschutz were the Stahlhelm, which was the armed wing of the Monarchist German National People's Party (DVNP), Trotskyites, and "radical nationalist parties."

According to Koehler, the KPD's Selbstschutz men "always carried a Stahlrute, two steel springs that telescoped into a tube seventeen centimeters long, which when extended became a deadly, 35-centimeter weapon. Not to be outdone by the Nazis, these street-fighters were often armed with pistols as well."

In a 1931 biography written for the Cadre Division of the Comintern, Mielke recalled, "We took care of all kinds of work: terror acts, protecting illegal demonstrations and meetings, arms-trafficking, etc. The last work, which was accomplished by a Comrade and myself, was the Bülowplatz Affair" (German: "Wir erledigten hier alle möglichen Arbeiten, Terrorakte, Schutz illegaler Demonstrationen und Versammlungen, Waffentransport und reinigung usw. Als letzte Arbeit erledigten ein Genosse und ich die Bülowplatzsache.").

== Bülowplatz murders ==
=== Planning ===
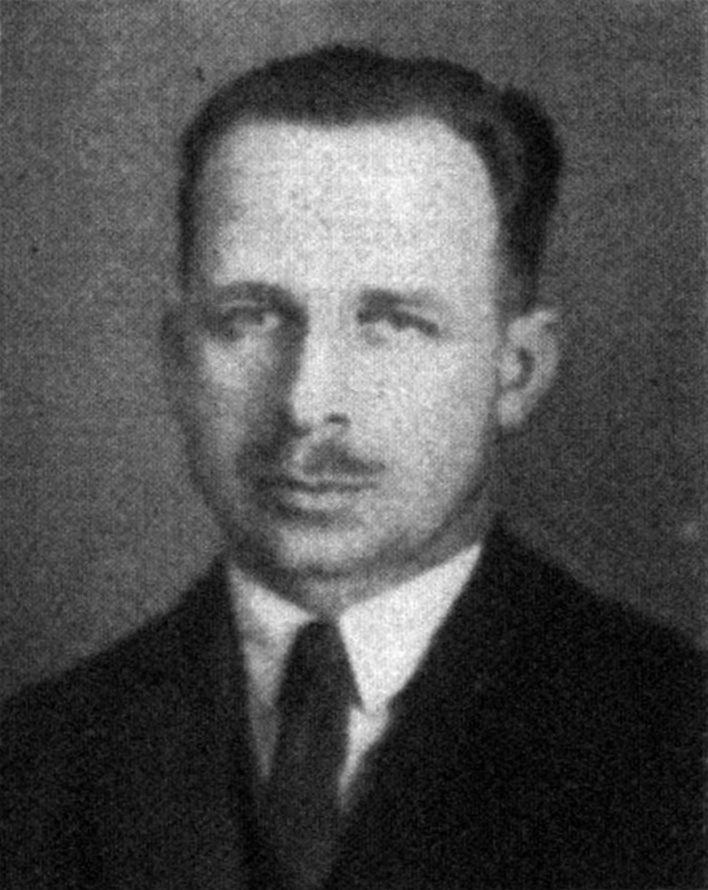
Walter Ulbricht, mastermind of the Anlauf-Lenck murders, later General Secretary of the East German SED from 1949 to 1971.

During the last days of the Weimar Republic, the KPD had a policy of assassinating two Berlin police officers in retaliation for every KPD member killed by the police.

On 2 August 1931, KPD Members of the Reichstag Heinz Neumann and Hans Kippenberger received a dressing down from Walter Ulbricht, the Party's leader in the Berlin-Brandenburg region. Enraged by police interference and by Neumann and Kippenberger's failure to follow the policy, Ulbricht stated, "At home in Saxony we would have done something about the police a long time ago. Here in Berlin we will not fool around much longer. Soon we will hit the police in the head."

Enraged by Ulbricht's words, Kippenberger and Neumann decided to assassinate Paul Anlauf, the 42-year-old Captain of the Berlin Police's Seventh Precinct. Captain Anlauf, a widower with three daughters, had been nicknamed "Schweinebacke", or "Pig Face" by the KPD.

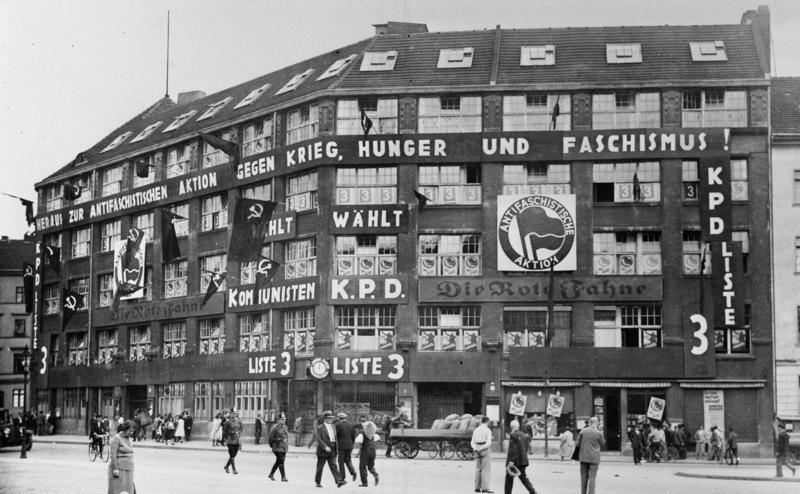
Karl-Liebknecht-Haus, Bülowplatz the KPD's headquarters from 1926 to 1933. Today it is the Berlin headquarters of the Left Party.

According to historian John Koehler, "Of all the policemen in strife-torn Berlin, the reds hated Anlauf the most. His precinct included the area around KPD headquarters, which made it the most dangerous in the city. The captain almost always led the riot squads that broke up illegal rallies of the Communist Party."

On the morning of Sunday 9 August 1931, Kippenberger and Neumann gave a last briefing to the hit-team in a room at the Lassant beer hall. Mielke and Erich Ziemer were selected as the shooters. During the meeting, Max Matern gave a Luger pistol to fellow lookout Max Thunert and said, "Now we're getting serious. We're going to give Schweinebacke something to remember us by."

Kippenberger then asked Mielke and Ziemer, "Are you sure that you are ready to shoot Schweinebacke?" Mielke responded that he had seen Anlauf many times during police searches of Party Headquarters. Kippenberger then instructed them to wait at a nearby beer hall which would permit them to overlook the entire Bülow-Platz. He further reminded them that Anlauf was accompanied everywhere by Senior Sergeant Max Willig, whom the KPD had nicknamed, "Hussar".

Kippenberger concluded, "When you spot Schweinebacke and Hussar, you take care of them." Mielke and Ziemer were informed that, after the assassinations were completed, a diversion would assist in their escape. They were then to return to their homes and await further instructions.

That evening, Anlauf was lured to Bülow-Platz by a violent rally demanding the dissolution of the Prussian Parliament.

According to Koehler, "As was often the case when it came to battling the dominant SPD, the KPD and the Nazis had combined forces during the pre-plebiscite campaign. At one point in this particular campaign, Nazi propaganda chief Joseph Goebbels even shared a speaker's platform with KPD agitator Walter Ulbricht. Both parties wanted the parliament dissolved because they were hoping that new elections would oust the SPD, the sworn enemy of all radicals. That fact explained why the atmosphere was particularly volatile this Sunday."

=== Murder at the Babylon Cinema ===
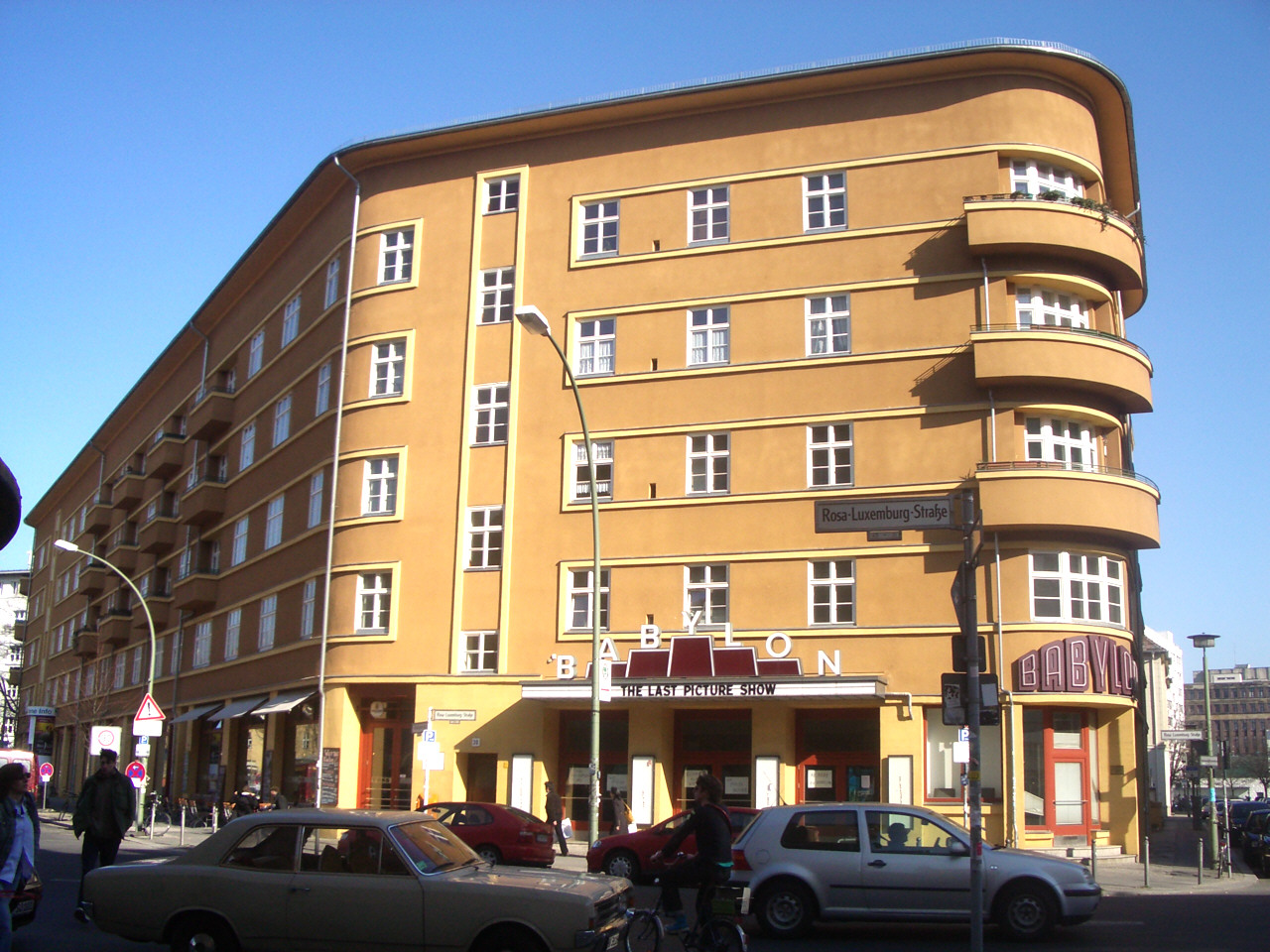
The "Babylon Cinema," the site of the assassinations of Captains Anlauf and Lenck, as it appears today.

At eight o'clock that evening, Mielke and Ziemer waited in a doorway as Anlauf, Willig, and Captain Franz Lenck walked toward the Babylon Cinema, which was located at the corner of Bülowplatz and Kaiser-Wilhelm-Straße. As they reached the door of the movie house, the policemen heard someone scream, "Schweinebacke!"

As Anlauf turned toward the sound, Mielke and Ziemer opened fire at point blank range. Willig was wounded in the left arm and the stomach. However, he managed to draw his Luger pistol and fired a full magazine at the assailants. Lenck was shot in the chest and fell dead in front of the entrance. Willig crawled over and cradled the head of Anlauf, who was bleeding to death from two bullet wounds in his neck. Before Paul Anlauf died, Sergeant Willig heard the Captain gasp, (German: "Wiedersehen... Gruss...") ("So Long... Goodbye...").

Meanwhile, Mielke and Ziemer made their escape by running into the theater and out an emergency exit. They tossed their pistols over a fence, where they were later found by Homicide Detectives from the elite Mordkommission. Mielke and Ziemer then returned to their homes.

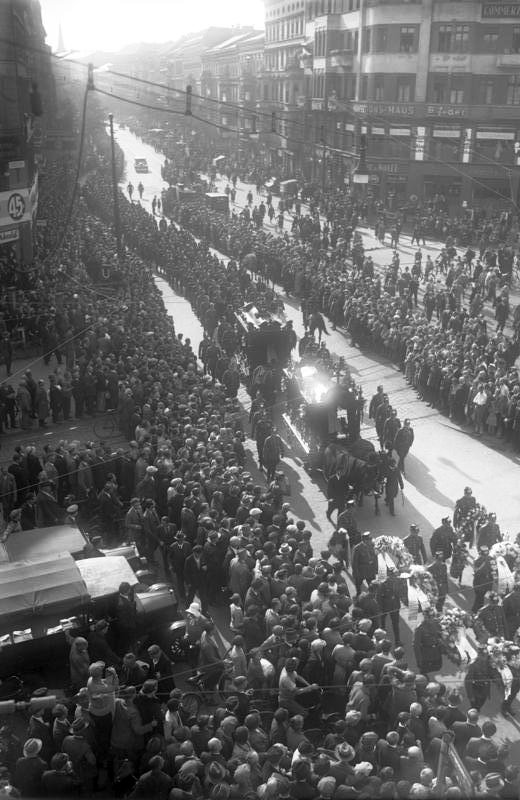
The funeral of Captains Anlauf and Lenck was attended by thousands of Berliners.

According to Koehler, "Back at Bülowplatz, the killings had triggered a major police action. At least a thousand officers poured into the square, and a bloody street battle ensued. Rocks and bricks were hurled from the rooftops. Communist gunmen fired indiscriminately from the roofs of surrounding apartment houses. As darkness fell, police searchlights illuminated the buildings. Using megaphones, officers shouted, "Clear the streets! Move away from the windows! We are returning fire!" By now the rabble had fled the square, but shooting continued as riot squads combed the tenements, brutally beating and arresting hundreds of residents suspected of having fired weapons. The battle lasted until one o'clock the next morning. In addition to the two police officers, the casualties included one Communist who died of a gunshot wound and seventeen others who were seriously wounded."

Anlauf's wife had died three weeks earlier of kidney failure. The murder of Anlauf thus left their three daughters as orphans. Their oldest daughter was forced to rush her planned wedding in order to keep her sisters from being put in an orphanage. Lenck was survived by his wife. Willig was hospitalized for 14 weeks, but made a full recovery and returned to active duty. In recognition for Willig's courage, the Berlin Police promoted him to Lieutenant.

After the murders, the act was celebrated at the Lichtenberger Hof, a favorite beer hall of the Rotfrontkämpferbund, where Mielke boasted: "Today we celebrate a job that I pulled!" (German: "Heute wird ein Ding gefeiert, das ich gedreht habe!")

=== Fugitive ===
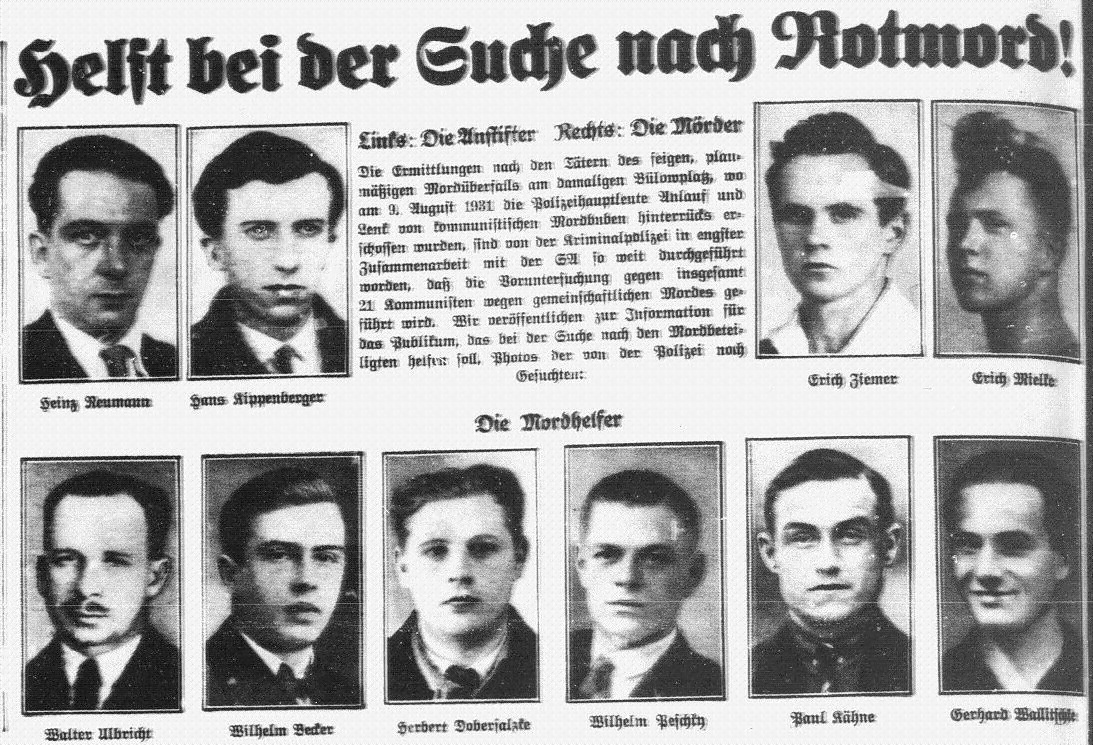
"Help with the Search for the Red Murderers!" A wanted poster published the Berlin Police following the murder of two police officers, September 1933. Mielke is top right.

According to Koehler, "Kippenberger was alarmed when word reached him that Sergeant Willig had survived the shooting. Not knowing whether the sergeant could talk and identify the attackers, Kippenberger was taking no chances. He directed a runner to summon Mielke and Ziemer to his apartment at 74 Bellermannstrasse, only a few minutes walk from where the two lived. When the assassins arrived, Kippenberger told them the news and ordered them to leave Berlin at once. The parliamentarian's wife, Thea, an unemployed schoolteacher and as staunch a Communist Party member as her husband, shepherded the young murderers to the Belgian border. Agents of the Communist International (Comintern) in the port city of Antwerp supplied them with money and forged passports. Aboard a merchant ship, they sailed for Leningrad. When their ship docked, they were met by another Comintern representative, who escorted them to Moscow."

Beginning in 1932, Mielke attended the Comintern's Military Political school under the alias Paul Bach. He later graduated from the Lenin School shortly before being recruited into the OGPU.

=== Trial ===
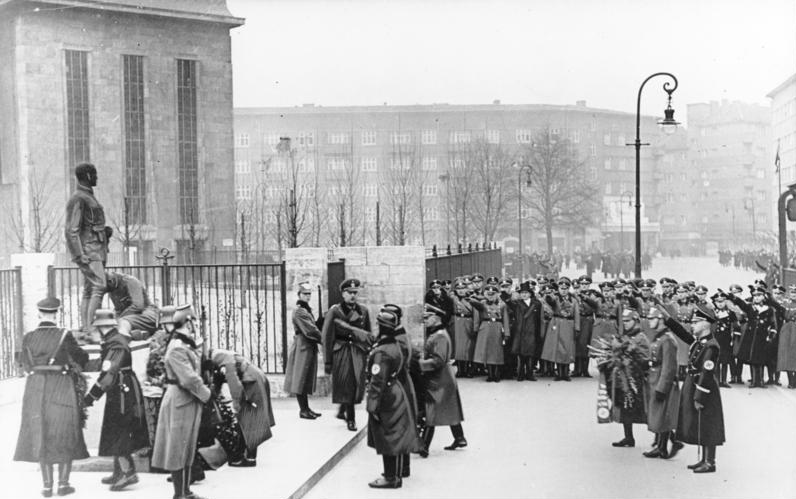
German policemen lay a wreath on the monument to Captains Anlauf and Lenck during the Day of the German Police, 16 January 1937. Despite the fact that Captains Anlauf and Lenck were members of the SPD, the Nazi salute is given by many of those present. In 1951, Mielke ordered the demolition of the monument.

According to Koehler, "In mid-March 1933, while attending the Lenin School, Mielke received word from his OGPU sponsors that Berlin police had arrested Max Thunert, one of the conspirators in the Anlauf and Lenck murders. Within days, fifteen other members of the assassination team were in custody. Mielke had to wait six more months before the details of the police action against his Berlin comrades reached Moscow. On 14 September 1933, Berlin newspapers reported that all fifteen had confessed to their roles in the murders. Arrest warrants were issued for ten others who had fled, including Mielke, Ziemer, Ulbricht, Kippenberger, and Neumann."

On 19 June 1934, the 15 conspirators were convicted of murder. The three deemed most culpable, Michael Klause, Max Matern, and Friedrich Bröde were sentenced to death. Their co-defendants received sentences ranging from nine months to fifteen years incarceration at hard labor. Klause's sentence was commuted to life in prison based upon his cooperation. Bröde hanged himself in his cell. As a result, only Matern was left to be executed by beheading on 22 May 1935.

Matern was subsequently glorified as a martyr by KPD and East German propaganda. Ziemer was officially killed in action while fighting on the Republican-side during the Spanish Civil War. Mielke, however, would not face trial for the murders until 1993.

== Career in Soviet intelligence ==
=== The Great Terror ===
Picture of Felix Dzerzhinsky during a 1936 parade in Red Square.

Although Moscow's German Communist community was decimated during Joseph Stalin's Great Purge, Mielke survived and was promoted.

In a handwritten autobiography prepared after World War II, Mielke recalled, "During my stay in the S.U. (Soviet Union), I participated in all Party discussions of the K.P.D. and also in the problems concerning the establishment of socialism and in the trials against the traitors and enemies of the S.U."

Among the German communists executed as a result of these "discussions" were Mielke's former mentors Heinz Neumann and Hans Kippenberger.

Mielke further recalled, "I was a guest on the honor grandstand of Red Square during the May Day and October Revolution parades. I became acquainted with many comrades of the Federation of World Communist Parties and the War Council of the Special Commission of the Comintern. I will never forget my meeting with Comrade Dimitrov, the Chairman of the Comintern, whom I served as an aide together with another comrade. I saw Comrade Stalin during all demonstrations at Red Square, especially when I stood on the grandstand. I mention these meetings because all these comrades are our models and teachers for our work."

During his time in the USSR, Mielke also developed a lifelong reverence for Felix Dzerzhinsky, the Polish aristocrat who founded the Soviet secret police. Mielke also began an equally permanent habit of calling himself a Chekist.

In a citation written decades later, Mielke described his philosophy of life, "The Chekist is the political combatant. He is the loyal son of... the workers' class. He stands at the head of the battle to strengthen the power of our workers' and peasants' state."

=== Spanish Civil War ===
The flag of the International Brigades was the Spanish Republican flag with the three-pointed star of the Popular Front in the center

From 1936 to 1939, Mielke served in Spain as an operative of the Servicio de Investigación Militar, the political police of the Second Spanish Republic. While attached to the staff of, "veteran GRU agent," and future Stasi minister Wilhelm Zaisser, Mielke used the alias Fritz Leissner. Bernd Kaufmann, the director of the Stasi's espionage school later said, "The Soviets trusted Mielke implicitly. He earned his spurs in Spain."

At the time, the S.I.M. was heavily staffed by agents of the Soviet NKVD, whose Spanish rezident was General Aleksandr Mikhailovich Orlov. According to author Donald Rayfield, "Stalin, Yezhov, and Beria distrusted Soviet participants in the Spanish war. Military advisors like Vladimir Antonov-Ovseenko, journalists like Koltsov were open to infection by the heresies, especially Trotsky's, prevalent among the Republic's supporters. NKVD agents sent to Spain were therefore keener on abducting and murdering anti-Stalinists among Republican leaders and International Brigade commanders than on fighting Franco. The defeat of the Republic, in Stalin's eyes, was caused not by the NKVD's diversionary efforts, but by the treachery of the heretics."

In a 1991 interview, Walter Janka, a fellow German communist exile and company commander in the International Brigade, recalled his encounters with Mielke. During the winter of 1936, Janka was summoned by the SIM and interrogated by Mielke. Mielke demanded to know why Janka had voluntarily traveled to Spain rather than being assigned there by the Party. When he told Mielke to get lost, the SIM demoted Janka to the ranks and then expelled him from the International Brigade. Years later, Janka recalled, "While I was fighting at the front, shooting at the Fascists, Mielke served in the rear, shooting Trotskyites and Anarchists."

Upon the defeat of the Spanish Republic, Mielke fled across the Pyrenees Mountains to the Third French Republic, which interned him at Camp de Rivesaltes, Pyrénées-Orientales. Mielke, however, managed to send a message to exiled KPD members and, in May 1939, he escaped to Belgium. Although the Public Prosecutor of Berlin learned of Mielke's presence and filed for his extradition, the Belgian Government refused to comply, regarding the assassinations of Captains Anlauf and Lenck as "a political crime."

Both the Spanish Red Terror and the NKVD and the SIM's witch hunt for both real and imagined anti-Stalinists, however, had deadly serious political consequences. They horrified numerous formerly pro-Soviet Westerners who had been witnesses, including John Dos Passos, Arthur Koestler and George Orwell, and caused them to permanently turn against the U.S.S.R.

Mielke's belief in Stalin's official explanation for the defeat, that anti-Stalinists had stabbed the Spanish Republic in the back, continued to shape his attitudes for the rest of his life. In a 1982 speech before a group of senior Stasi officers, Mielke said, "We are not immune from villains among us. If I knew of any already, they wouldn't live past tomorrow. Short shrift. It's because I'm a Humanist, that I'm of this view."

In the same speech, Mielke also said, "All this blithering over to execute or not to execute, for the death penalty or against—all rot, Comrades. Execute! And, when necessary, without a court judgment."

=== World War II ===
During World War II, Mielke's movements remain mysterious. In a biography written after the war, he claimed to have infiltrated Organisation Todt under the alias Richard Hebel. Historian John O. Koehler considers this unlikely, but notes that Mielke's real exploits "must have been substantial. By war's end, he had been decorated with the Order of the Red Banner, the Order of the Great Patriotic War First Class, and twice with the Order of Lenin. It is likely that he served as an NKVD agent, at least part of the time with guerrilla units behind German lines, for he knew all the partisan songs by heart and sang them in faultless Russian."

== Occupied Germany ==
=== Komissariat-5 ===
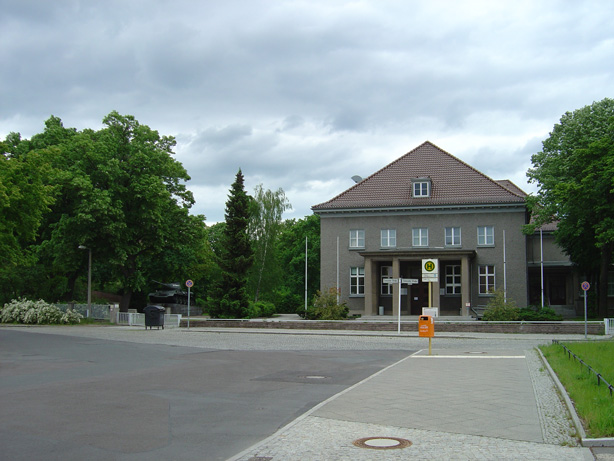
Former Soviet military and NKGB Headquarters in Karlshorst. Now the Museum Berlin-Karlshorst.

On 25 April 1945, Mielke returned to the Soviet Zone of Occupied Germany aboard a special Soviet aircraft that also carried fellow German Communists Walter Ulbricht, Wilhelm Zaisser, Ernst Wollweber, and many of the future leaders of East Germany.

That same month, Mielke's future handler, NKGB General Ivan Serov, travelled to Germany from Warsaw and, from his headquarters in the Berlin suburb of Karlshorst, divided the Soviet Zone into "Operative Sectors."

On 10 July 1945, Marshal Georgy Zhukov signed SMA Order No. 2, which legalized the re-establishment of "anti-fascist" political parties like the Communist Party of Germany (KPD). On 15 July 1945, Mielke walked into the KPD's headquarters and volunteered his services.

In an autobiography written for the KPD, Mielke disclosed—truthfully—his involvement in the 1931 murders of Berlin Police Captains Anlauf and Lenck, and—mistakenly or misleadingly—that for this he had been tried in absentia, found guilty, and sentenced to death. In actuality, Mielke's "name was mentioned in the 1934 trials but he was never tried". He admitted—truthfully—fighting on the Republican side during the Spanish Civil War, but claimed—falsely—that he had been released from the French internment camps and had worked in Belgium for an underground Communist newspaper under the code name "Gaston". Furthermore, Mielke concealed his past and contemporaneous involvement with the NKVD, NKGB, and the Nazi Organisation Todt (which he asserted he'd infiltrated).

According to Koehler, "As might be expected, Mielke's account of his past was approved by the Soviets. Had Serov not been part of the conspiracy, Mielke would have been instantly arrested or at least subjected to an intense internal investigation because of his membership in the Nazi Organisation Todt, which used thousands of slave laborers. But he was cleared in record time and by the end of June the Soviets had installed him as a station commander of the newly formed Volkspolizei (Vopo), the People's Police."

On 16 August 1947, Serov ordered the creation of Kommissariat 5, the first German political police since the defeat of Nazi Germany.

According to Anne Applebaum, however, not everyone approved of the plan. In Moscow, Soviet Interior Minister Viktor Abakumov argued that a new secret police force would be demonized by Western governments and the media, which would paint the K-5 as a "new Gestapo." Furthermore, Abakumov, like Stalin, intensely distrusted German Communists and alleged that there "were not enough German cadres who have been thoroughly checked." Notwithstanding Abakumov's objections, however, recruitment into the K-5 began almost immediately. It is possible, as Norman Naimark suspects, that the NKGB had realized that their officers' lack of fluency in the German language was engendering massive popular resentment.

Wilhelm Zaisser, who had been Mielke's commanding officer in Republican Spain, was appointed the K-5's head. Mielke was installed as his deputy.

According to John Koehler, "The K-5 was essentially an arm of the Soviet secret police. Its agents were carefully selected veteran German communists who had survived the Nazi-era in Soviet exile or in concentration camps and prisons. Their task was to track down Nazis and anti-communists, including hundreds of members of the Social Democratic Party. Mielke and his fellow bloodhounds performed this task with ruthless precision. The number of arrests became so great that the regular prisons could not hold them. Thus, Serov ordered the establishment or re-opening of eleven concentration camps, including the former Nazi death camps of Buchenwald and Sachsenhausen."

According to Anne Applebaum, "One of the few documents from that era to survive (most were removed by the KGB or perhaps destroyed, in 1989 or before) mentions a departmental training meeting and included a list of attendees. Topping the list is a group of Soviet advisers. In this sense, K-5 did resemble the political police in the rest of Eastern Europe: as in Hungary, Poland, and the USSR itself, this new political police force was initially extra-governmental, operating outside the ordinary rule of law."

According to Edward N. Peterson, "Not surprisingly, K-5 acquired a reputation as bad as that of Stalin's secret police and worse than that of the Gestapo. At least with the Nazis, albeit fanatically racist, their victims did not suddenly disappear into the GULAG."

=== The Amalgamation ===
The red flag of the SED bore the SED logo, which portrayed the handshake between Communist Wilhelm Pieck and Social Democrat Otto Grotewohl when their parties merged in 1946.

Despite the K-5's mass arrests of members of the Social Democratic Party of Germany (SPD) in the Soviet Zone, the number of SPD members continued to grow. By March 1946, SPD members outnumbered KPD members by more than 100,000. Fearing that they would lose the elections scheduled for the autumn, the leadership of the KPD asked for and received Stalin's permission to merge the two parties. When the SPD's leadership agreed only to schedule a vote for the rank and file to decide, permission was denied by the Soviet occupation authorities. The K-5 then began mass arrests of SPD members who refused to support the merger.

On 22 April 1946, the remaining leaders of the SPD in the Soviet Zone announced that they had united with the KPD to form the Socialist Unity Party of Germany (SED). The SPD in the western zones of Occupied Germany responded by forming the SPD East Bureau in order to support and finance those Social Democrats who refused to accept the merger. Those who joined or worked with the East Bureau were, however, in serious danger of arrest by the K-5 and trial by Soviet military tribunals. By 1950, more than 5,000 SPD members and sympathisers had been imprisoned in the Soviet Zone or transferred to the GULAG. More than 400 were either executed or died during their imprisonments.

John Koehler has written that, prior to the spring of 1946, many Germans in the Soviet Zone, "merely shrugged at the wave of arrests, believing that the victims were former Nazi officials and war criminals." But then came the mass arrests of Social Democrats who opposed the merger, who, "were joined by people who had been denounced for making anti-communist or anti-Soviet remarks, among their number hundreds who were as young as fourteen years. Although these arrests were made by Germans purporting to be officials of the criminal police, the existence of the K-5 political police eventually was exposed. Mielke, meanwhile, had risen to the post of vice-president of the German Administration for Interior Affairs – the equivalent of the NKVD – and continued his manipulations from behind the scenes."

=== Investigation ===
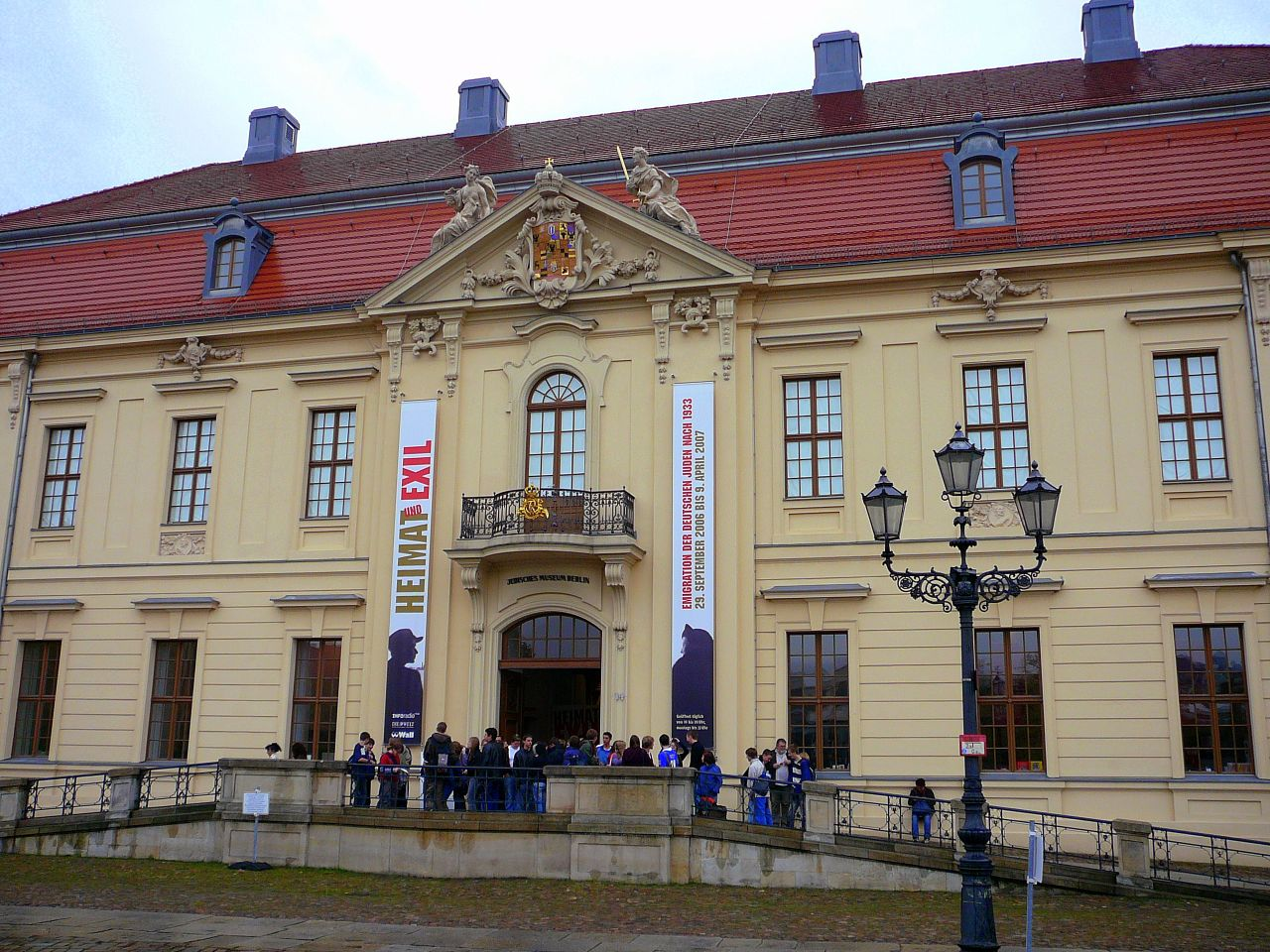
The Kammergericht

In January 1947, two retired Berlin policemen recognized Mielke at an official function. Informing the head of the criminal police in West Berlin, the policemen demanded that Mielke be arrested and prosecuted for the murders of Captains Anlauf and Lenck. Wilhelm Kühnast, the Public Prosecutor of Berlin, was immediately informed and ordered a search of the Kammergericht archives. To his astonishment, the files of the 1931 murders had survived the wartime bombing of Germany. Finding ample evidence of Mielke's involvement, Kühnast ordered the arrest of the communist policeman.

According to John Koehler, "At that time, the city administration, including the police, was under the control of the Allied Control Commission, which consisted of U.S., British, French, and Soviet military officers. All actions by city officials, including the judiciary, were to be reported to the Commission. The Soviet representative alerted the MGB. Action was swift. Marshal Vasily Sokolovsky, who had replaced Zhukov, protested, and his representatives at the Commission launched a vicious campaign to discredit Kühnast."

The Soviet representatives falsely claimed that Kühnast, a jurist with an impeccable anti-Nazi record, had been an official of Roland Freisler's People's Court. Taking the Soviets at their word, the Western Allies removed Kühnast from his position and placed him under house arrest. During the Berlin airlift, Kühnast fled from his home in East Berlin and was granted political asylum in the American Zone.

Meanwhile, the Soviet authorities confiscated all documents relating to the murders of Captains Anlauf and Lenck. According to Koehler, "The Soviets handed the court records to Mielke. Instead of destroying the incriminating papers, he locked them in his private safe, where they were found when his home was searched in 1990. They were used against him in his trial for murder."

=== Deutsche Wirtschaftskommission ===
In 1948, Mielke was appointed as security chief of the German Economic Commission (German: Deutsche Wirtschaftskommission), the precursor to the future East German government.

Mielke's task was to investigate the theft and sale of state property on the black market. He was also charged with intercepting the growing number of refugees fleeing to the French, British, and American Zones.

Those caught by Mielke's security forces while attempting to defect were used as slave labor in the uranium mines that were providing raw material for the Soviet atomic bomb project.

== German Democratic Republic ==
=== Independence ===
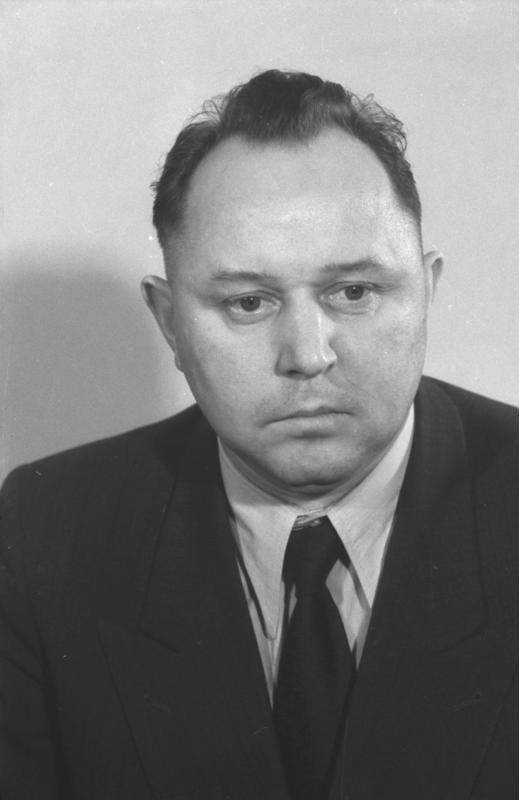
Mielke in 1954

In 1949, the Soviet Military Administration ceded its legal functions to the newly created German Democratic Republic.

On 14 January 1950, Marshal Vasili Chuikov announced that all Soviet "internment camps" on German soil had been closed. Soon after, the DWK was absorbed into the newly created Ministry for State Security. In keeping with earlier syllabic abbreviations along the same lines (see OrPo, KriPo, and GeStaPo) East Germans immediately dubbed it the "Stasi" (from Staatssicherheit). With the approval of the Soviets, Mielke's commanding officer from Spain and in the K5, Wilhelm Zaisser, was appointed as the Stasi's head. Mielke was appointed to his staff with the rank of State Secretary. Mielke was also granted a seat in the SED's ruling Politburo.

According to John Koehler, "In the five years since the end of World War II, the Soviets and their vassals had arrested between 170,000 and 180,000 Germans. Some 160,000 had passed through the concentration camps, and of these about 65,000 had died, 36,000 had been shipped to the Soviet Gulag, and another 46,000 had been freed."

In 1949, as a response to the remilitarization of East Germany and the Soviet blockade of West Berlin, the United States, United Kingdom, France, Belgium, the Netherlands, Luxembourg, and Portugal formed the North Atlantic Treaty Organization, or NATO. In 1950, as a response to the outbreak of the Korean War, West Germany was also permitted to join NATO, which was then upgraded into a military alliance.

According to Koehler, however, "As the Cold War intensified, living conditions in Soviet-occupied East Germany showed little improvement beyond the postwar level of bare subsistence. The new government of the DDR – a mere puppet of the Kremlin – relied more and more on the Stasi to quell discontent among factory workers and farmers. Ulbricht, claiming that the social unrest was fomented by capitalist agents, once ordered Mielke to personally visit one large plant and 'arrest four or five such agents' as an example to the others. The Stasi deputy 'discovered' the agents in record time."

=== Field show trials ===
Also in 1949, Noel Field, an American citizen who had spied for the NKVD from inside the U.S. State Department, the Office of Strategic Services, and the CIA, fled from his posting in Switzerland to Communist Czechoslovakia after his cover was blown by fellow mole Whittaker Chambers. On 11 May 1949, the Czechoslovak secret police, or StB, in obedience to a direct order from KGB chief Lavrenti Beria, arrested Field in Prague. Field was then handed over to the Hungarian ÁVO. After his interrogation in Budapest, Field was used as a witness at show trials of senior Soviet Bloc Communists who, like László Rajk and Rudolf Slánský, stood accused of having spied for the United States. The real reason for the trials was to replace homegrown Communists in Eastern Europe with those who would be blindly loyal to Joseph Stalin and to blame the division of Germany on the intrigues of U.S. intelligence.

At the Rajk show trial, the prosecutor declared, "Noel Field, one of the leaders of American espionage, specialized in recruiting spies from among left-wing elements."

In August 1950, six senior SED members, including Willi Kreikemeyer, the director of Deutsche Reichsbahn and head of Berliner Rundfunk, were accused of "special connections with Noel Field, the American spy." All were either imprisoned or shot.

John Koehler writes, "Similar purges were conducted in Czechoslovakia, Hungary, and Bulgaria, where Field appeared as a witness in show trials that resulted in some death sentences. The Soviets simply distrusted all Communists who had sought exile in the West. All the while, Mielke remained untouched and continued to serve as the deputy secret police chief. His survival reinforced the belief that he had spent the war years in the Soviet Union instead of France and Belgium as he had claimed in the 1945 questionnaire."

In June 1950, Erica Wallach, Noel Field's adopted daughter, decided to search for him. From Paris, she telephoned Leo Bauer, the editor-in-chief of Berliner Rundfunk. The call was monitored by agents of the Soviet Ministry for Internal Affairs, and Bauer's handler instructed him to invite Mrs. Wallach to East Berlin, where she was immediately arrested. Mielke personally interrogated her and, at one point, offered Mrs. Wallach immediate release if she named the members of her fictitious spy network. She was condemned to death by a Soviet military tribunal in East Berlin and shipped to the Lubianka prison in Moscow for her execution. After Joseph Stalin's death in on 5 March 1953, Erica Wallach's sentence was reduced to hard labor in Vorkuta, a region of the Gulag located above the Arctic Circle. She was released during the Khrushchev thaw in October 1955. At first, she was unable to join her husband and daughters in the U.S. because of the U.S. State Department's concern over her former membership in the Communist Party of Germany. It took the personal intervention of CIA Director Allen Dulles to reunite Erica Wallach with her family in 1957. Wallach's memoir of her experiences, Light at Midnight, was published in 1967.

=== Death of Stalin ===
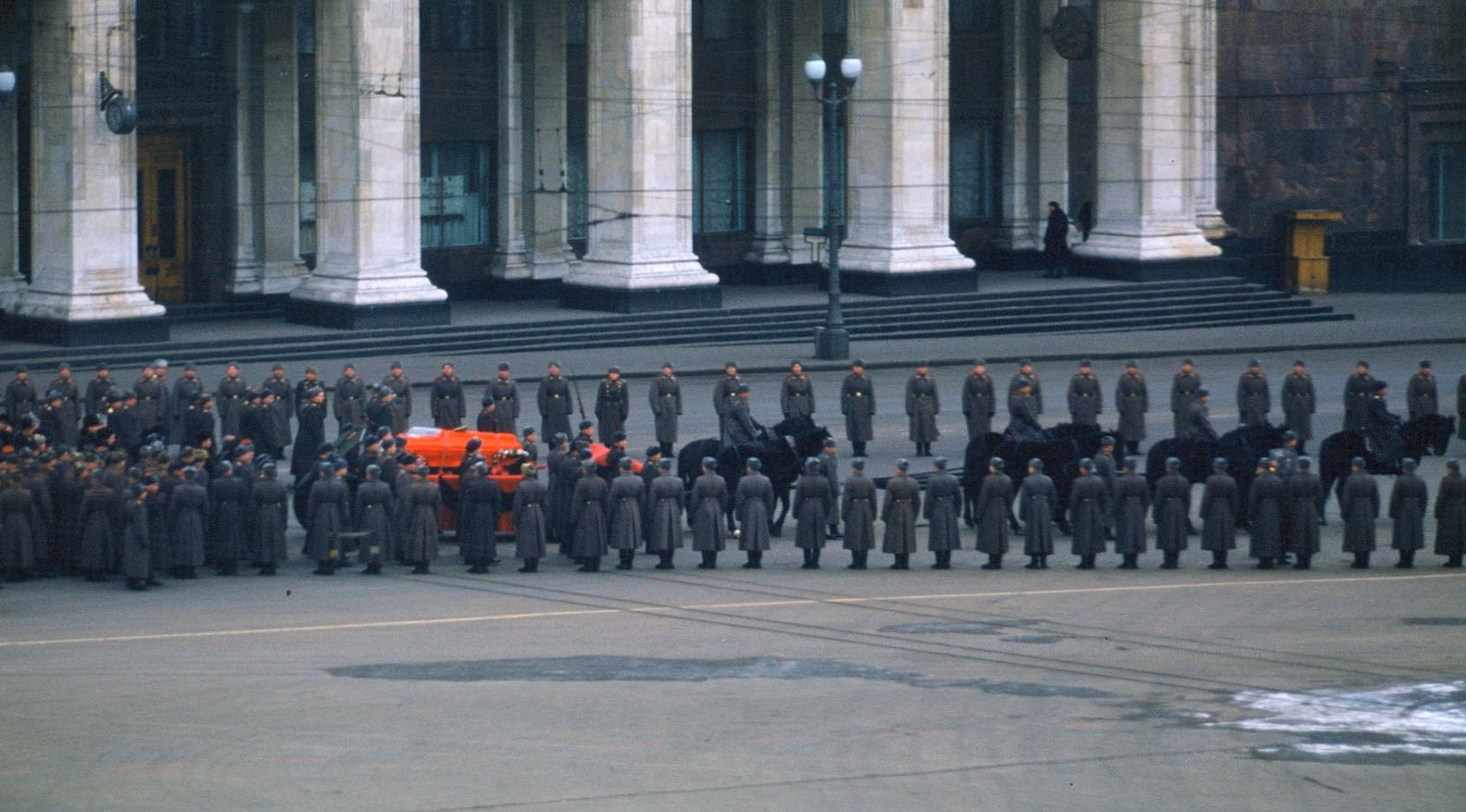
Stalin's casket on howitzer carriage draught by horses, caught on camera by US assistant army attaché Major Martin Manhoff from the American embassy balcony

After Soviet Premier Joseph Stalin died inside his Kuntsevo Dacha on 5 March 1953, the Central Committee of the East German Socialist Unity Party met in a special session and eulogized the dictator as the "great friend of Germany who was always an advisor of and help to our people."

Two months later, on 5 May 1953, the SED's General Secretary, Walter Ulbricht, and the rest of the leadership increased work quotas by 10%. They also decided to rename Chemnitz Karl-Marx-Stadt and to institute the Order of Karl Marx as the GDR's highest award.

Two weeks later, Mielke accused "a group of Party officials" of "plotting against the leadership", which "resulted in more expulsions from the Politburo and the Central Committee."

=== East German uprising of 1953 ===
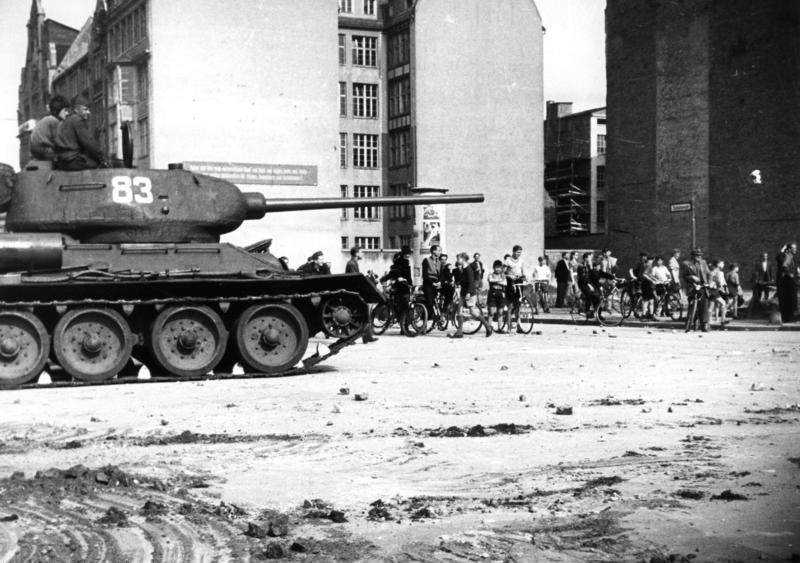
A Soviet tank rolling into East Berlin during the East German uprising of 1953.

Discontent among factory workers about a 10% increase of work quotas without a corresponding wage hike boiled over. On 16 June 1953, nearly one hundred construction workers gathered before work for a protest meeting at Stalinallee, in East Berlin. Words spread rapidly to other construction sites and hundreds of men and women joined the rally, which marched to the House of Ministries. The protesters chanted slogans for five hours, demanding to speak to Walter Ulbricht and Otto Grotewohl. Only Heavy Industry Minister Fritz Selbmann and Professor Robert Havemann, president of the GDR Peace Council, emerged. Their speech, however, was answered with jeers and the Ministers retreated into the heavily armed building. The regular and the Kasernierte Volkspolizei were summoned from their barracks, but made no move to attack the protesters, who returned to Stalinallee, where a general strike was called.

Following West Germany's Federal Minister for All-German Questions Jakob Kaiser's admonition in a late night broadcast to East Germans to shy away from provocations, RIAS, starting with its 11 pm news broadcast, and from then on in hourly intermissions, repeated the workers' demand to continue the strike the next day, calling specifically for all East Berliners to participate in a demo at 7am on the 17th at Strausberger Platz.

The following day, 17 June 1953, more than 100,000 protesters took to the streets of East Berlin. More than 400,000 protesters also took to the streets in other cities and towns throughout the German Democratic Republic. Everywhere, the demands were the same: free elections by secret ballot.

Outside of Berlin, the main centres of the protests included the industrial region around Halle, Merseburg, and Bitterfeld, as well as middle-size towns like Jena, Görlitz, and Brandenburg. No more than 25,000 people participated in strikes and demonstrations in Leipzig, but there were 32,000 in Magdeburg, 43,000 in Dresden, 53,000 in Potsdam – and in Halle, a figure close to 100,000.

In West Berlin, the American radio station RIAS and several other West German stations reported on the protests and on plans for a general strike. As East Germans listened to the broadcasts, 267,000 workers at State-owned plants in 304 cities and towns joined the general strike. In 24 towns, outraged East Germans stormed the Stasi's prisons and freed between 2,000 and 3,000 political prisoners.

In response to orders, the Soviet Occupation Forces, the Stasi and the Kasernierte Volkspolizei went on the attack. Bloody street battles ensued and hundreds of policemen defected to the side of the protesters. Both police and Stasi stations were overrun and some government offices were sacked. The Party leadership retreated into a fortified compound in the Pankow district of East Berlin.

At noon, the Soviet authorities terminated all tram and metro traffic into the Eastern sector and all but closed the sector borders to West Berlin to prevent more demonstrators from reaching the city centre. An hour later, they declared martial law in East Berlin.

The repression took place outside East Berlin police HQ – where Soviet tanks opened fire on "the insurgents".

According to John Koehler, "... by late afternoon, Soviet tanks accompanied by infantry and MVD troops had rolled into East Berlin and other cities in the Soviet Zone. This made the people even angrier. At Berlin's Potsdamer Platz, which bordered on the American Sector, irate protesters ignored machine gun fire and the menacing barrels of tank guns. They ripped cobblestones from the streets and hurled them at the tanks."

Fighting between the Red Army (and later GDR police) and the demonstrators persisted into the afternoon and night. In some cases, the tanks and the soldiers fired directly into the crowds.

Overnight, the Soviets (and the Stasi) started to arrest hundreds of people. Ultimately, up to 10,000 people were detained and at least 20, probably as many as 40, people were executed, including Red Army soldiers who refused to obey orders. With the SED leadership effectively paralysed at the Soviet headquarters in Karlshorst, control of the city passed to the Soviets.

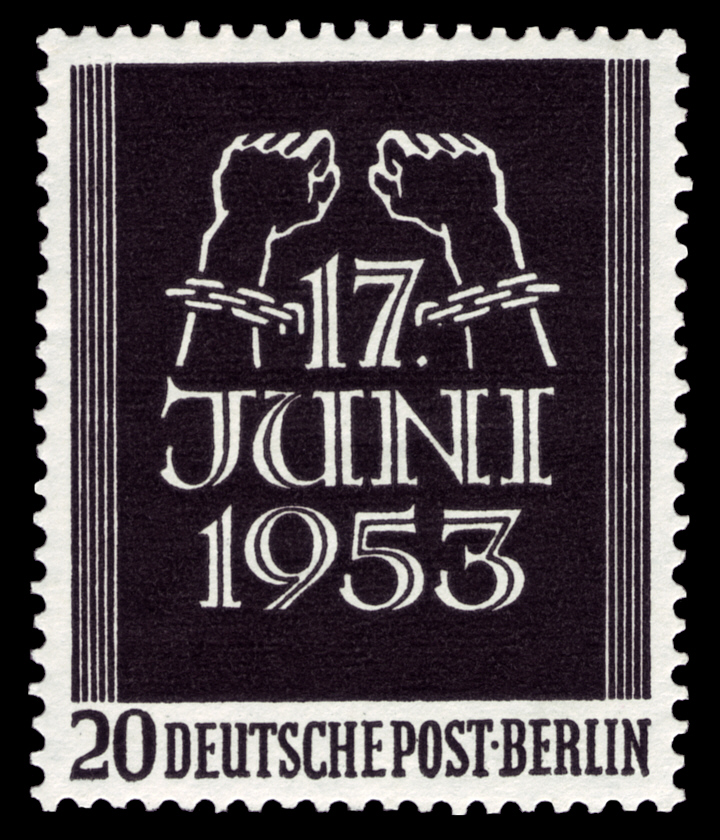
Deutsche Bundespost Berlin stamp

In honor of the uprising, West Germany established 17 June as a national holiday, called Day of German Unity. The extension of the Unter den Linden boulevard to the west of the Brandenburg Gate, formerly called Charlottenburger Chaussee, was also renamed Straße des 17. Juni ("17 June Street") in honor of the uprising.

According to John Koehler, "Provisional prison camps were set up to hold the thousands of Stasi victims. Nearly 1,500 persons were sentenced in secret trials to long prison terms. On 24 June, Mielke issued a terse announcement that one Stasi officer, nineteen demonstrators, and two bystanders had been killed during the uprising. He did not say how many were victims of official lynching. The numbers of the wounded were given as 191 policemen, 126 demonstrators, and 61 bystanders."

Also according to Koehler, "Calm returned to the streets of the Soviet Zone, yet escapes to the West continued at a high rate. Of the 331,390 who fled in 1953, 8,000 were members of the Kasernierte Volkspolizei, the barracked people's police units, which were actually the secret cadre of the future East German Army. Also among the escapees were 2,718 members and candidates of the SED, the ruling Party."

== The Khrushchev thaw ==
=== Purges ===
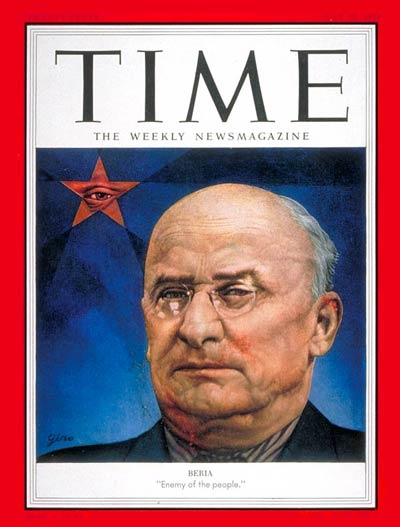
Lavrenty Beria on the cover of Time, 20 July 1953.

Alarmed by the uprising, Lavrenty Beria, the First Deputy Premier of the Soviet Union and head of the Ministry of Internal Affairs, personally travelled from Moscow to East Berlin. He conferred with Stasi Minister Wilhelm Zaisser and with Mielke, his deputy, both of whom he had known since the early 1930s. During both conversations, Beria demanded to know why the Stasi had failed to recognize the extreme discontent of the population and inform the Party leadership, which could then have prevented the uprising by taking extremely repressive measures in advance. Both Zaisser and Mielke answered Beria's questions circumspectly, and were accordingly left in their posts.

In response to the uprising, Beria decided to replace several hundred MVD officers, including Major General Ivan Fadeykin, the MVD resident of East Germany. The Stasi, according to John Koehler, "generally remained untouched except for the arrests and dismissals, for dereliction of duty, of a handful of officers in the provinces. One high-ranking Stasi officer shot himself."

Following Beria's return to Moscow, however, he was arrested on 26 June 1953, in a coup d'état led by Nikita Khrushchev and Marshal Georgy Zhukov. Beria was tried on charges of 357 counts of rape and high treason. He was sentenced to death and shot by Red Army Colonel-General Pavel Batitsky on 23 December 1953.

In an interview to Neues Deutschland, the official party newspaper of East Germany, on 30 June 1953, the Party's Minister of Justice, Max Fechner, declared that, "illegal arrests," had been made and that being a member of a strike committee or suspicion of being a ringleader was not in itself grounds for arrest and conviction.

Meanwhile, when the East German Politburo met on 8 July, it seemed that Ulbricht would be deposed as Party General Secretary. Zaisser conceded that the whole Politburo was responsible for the "accelerated construction of socialism" and of the subsequent fallout. But he also added that to leave Ulbricht as Premier, "would be opposed catastrophic for the New Course".

By the end of the meeting, only two Politburo members still supported Ulbricht's leadership: Free German Youth League chief Erich Honecker and Party Control Commission Chairman Hermann Matern. Ulbricht only managed to forestall a decision then and there with a promise to make a statement at the forthcoming 15th SED CC Plenum, scheduled for later that month.

Meanwhile, Mielke informed a Party commission looking for scapegoats that his boss, Stasi Minister Wilhelm Zaisser, was calling for secret negotiations with West Germany and that, "he believed the Soviet Union would abandon the DDR."

By late July, Ulbricht was completely certain that he had the support of the new Soviet First Secretary, Nikita Khrushchev. Therefore, he expelled his main opponents, Zaisser, Hernstadt and Ackermann, from the Politburo, and thus strengthened his position further.

SED Minister of Justice Max Fechner was personally arrested by Mielke and replaced by Hilde Benjamin, who was known to East German citizens as "Red Hilde", "The Red Freisler," and as, "The Red Guillotine," for her role as a judge in the SED's show trials.

Fechner was convicted of being, "an enemy of the Party and the State," and served three years in Bautzen Prison.

Wilhelm Zaisser was replaced as head of the Stasi by Ernst Wollweber in 1953 and the Stasi was simultaneously downgraded to a State Secretariat under the Ministry of the Interior under the leadership of Willi Stoph. Mielke remained on staff as Wollweber's deputy. Mielke would serve as Deputy State Secretary of State Security between 1953 and 1955.

The Stasi was restored to a ministry in 1955. Wollweber thus became Minister for State Security and Mielke Deputy Minister for State Security.

== Tenure as Stasi head ==
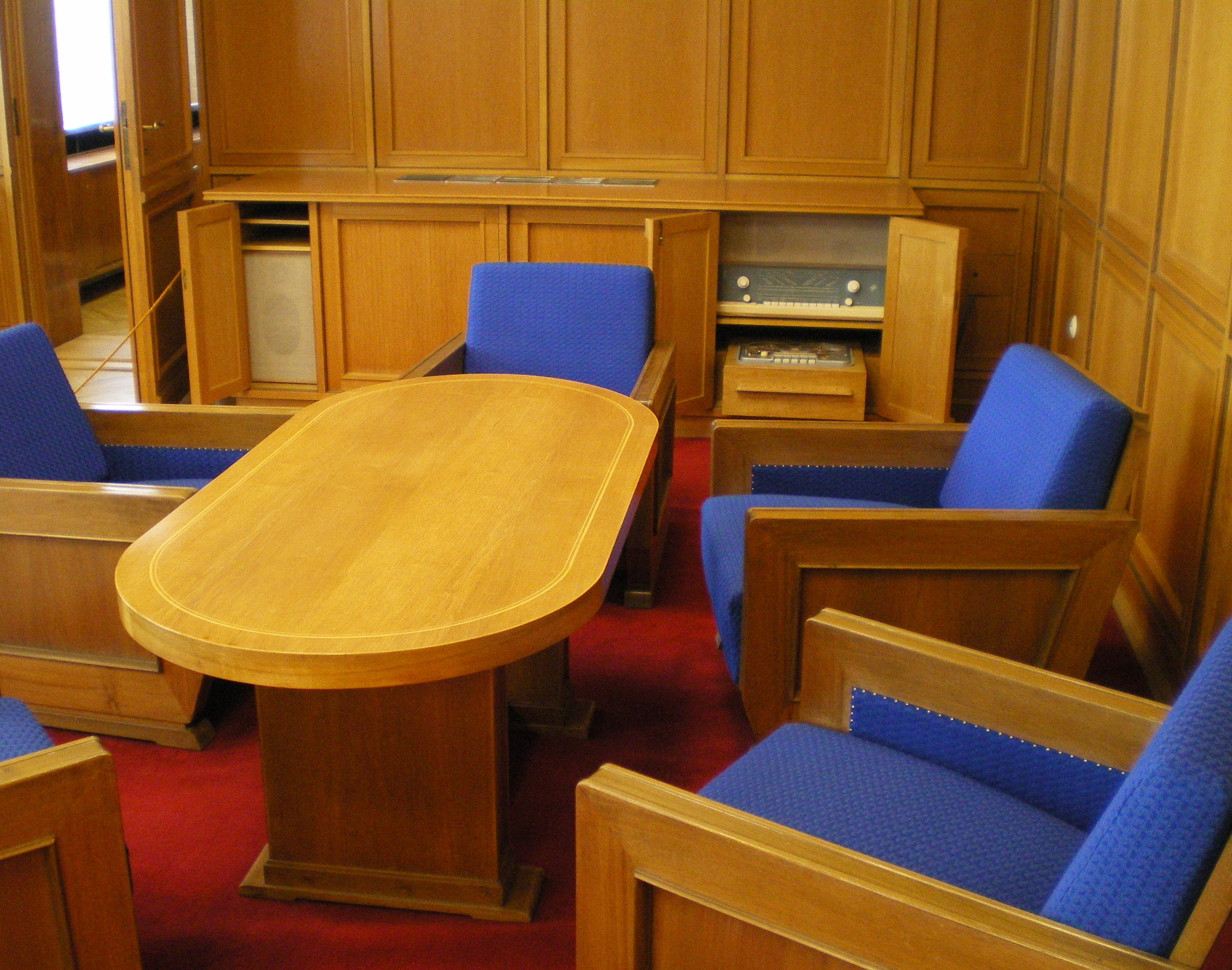
Erich Mielke's Office, Stasi Museum, Berlin.

Mielke headed the Stasi from 1957 until the fall of the Berlin Wall in 1989. As a Politburo member, Mielke moved into newly built secure housing zone for the leaders of East Germany in Waldsiedlung in 1960. Mielke occupied house number 14. There was, under the East German system, no provision for parliamentary oversight of the Stasi. However, starting in 1971 Mielke was required to provide a detailed intelligence briefing to party secretary Erich Honecker each Tuesday, directly following the weekly Politburo meeting. (Before 1971, under Walter Ulbricht, Mielke was not involved in routine intelligence briefings to the leadership which, instead, were provided directly to Ulbricht by Intelligence Chief Markus Wolf.)

According to Anna Funder's award-winning exposé Stasiland, after becoming Minister for State Security in 1957, Mielke, in a backhanded compliment to George Orwell's Nineteen Eighty-Four, ordered every room inside Stasi Headquarters renumbered so that his own office would be Room 101.

=== Internal discipline ===
During his tenure, Mielke enforced "political and personal discipline reminiscent of the early French Foreign Legion". New recruits were required to take a solemn oath pledging "to fight alongside the state security organs of all socialist countries against all enemies of socialism" on pain of "the severest punishment under the Republic's laws and the contempt of the workers." Recruits were also required to sign a security pledge vowing never to make unauthorized visits to any "capitalist countries" and to report on any members of their families who did so.

Violations of the oath resulted in expulsion from the Stasi and blacklisting from all but the most menial jobs. Serious violations were tried before secret tribunals and led an estimated 200 Stasi agents to be shot. Colonel Rainer Wiegand once said, "There was only one way to leave the MfS without being haunted for the rest of your life. You either retired or you died."

=== Domestic activities ===
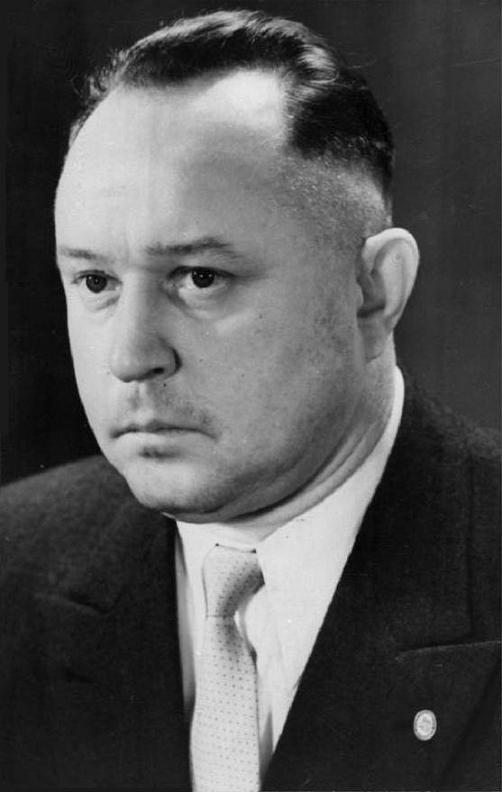
Erich Mielke, 1959.

Under Erich Mielke's leadership, the Stasi employed 85,000 full-time domestic spies and 170,000 civilian informants (German: inoffizielle Mitarbeiter) (IMs). East Germans coined a term to describe the Stasi's pervasive surveillance of the population: "blanket coverage" (German: flächendeckend). For this reason, Anna Funder has referred to East Germany as, "the most perfected surveillance state of all time."

According to John Koehler, "...the Stasi's tentacles probed every aspect of life. Full-time officers were posted to all major industrial plants. Without exception, one tenant in every building was designated as a watchdog reporting to an area representative of the Volkspolizei...In turn, the police officer was the Stasi's man. If a relative or friend came to stay overnight, it was reported. Schools, universities and hospitals were infiltrated from top to bottom. German academe was shocked to learn that Heinrich Fink, professor of theology and vice-chancellor of East Berlin's Humboldt University, had been a Stasi informer since 1968. After Fink's Stasi connections came to light, he was summarily fired. Doctors, lawyers, journalists, writers, actors, and sports figures were co-opted by Stasi officers, as were waiters and hotel personnel. Tapping about 100,000 telephone lines in East Germany and West Berlin around the clock was the job of 2,000 officers... Churchmen, including high officials of both Protestant and Catholic denominations, were recruited en masse as secret informants. Their offices and confessionals were infested with eavesdropping devices. Even the director of Leipzig's famous Thomas Church choir, Hans-Joachim Rotzsch, was forced to resign when he was unmasked as a Spitzel, the people's pejorative for a Stasi informant."

In an interview with journalist Anna Funder, an ex-Stasi officer recalled, "Most often, people we approached would inform for us. It was very rare that they would not. However, sometimes we felt that we might need to know where their weak points were, just in case. For example, if we wanted a pastor, we'd find out if he'd had an affair, or had a drinking problem—things that we could use as leverage. Mostly though, people said yes."

On Mielke's orders, and with his full knowledge, Stasi officers also engaged in arbitrary arrest, kidnapping, brutal harassment of political dissidents, torture, and the imprisonment of tens of thousands of citizens.

In a 1991 interview, Jewish Holocaust survivor and Nazi hunter Simon Wiesenthal said, "The Stasi was much, much worse than the Gestapo, if you consider only the oppression of its own people. The Gestapo had 40,000 officials watching a country of 80 million, while the Stasi employed 102,000 to control only 17 million."

=== Activities abroad ===
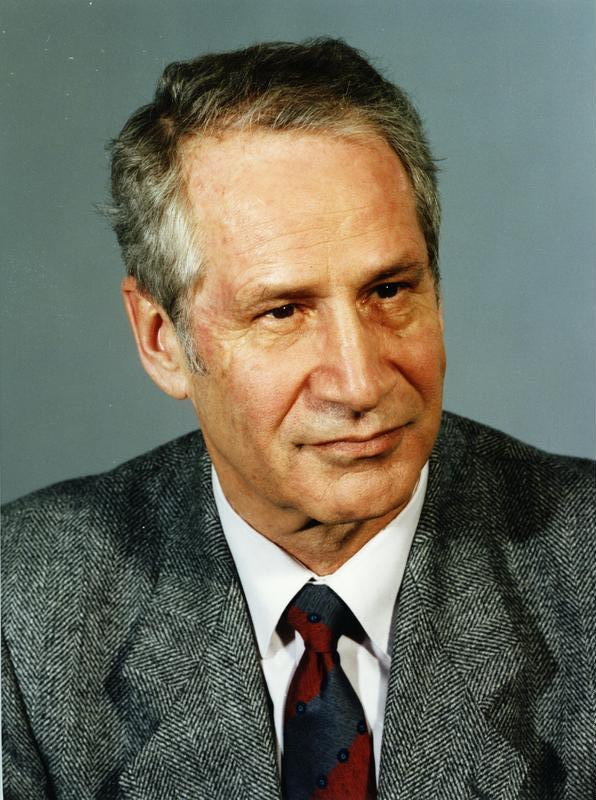
Markus Wolf

During Mielke's tenure, the Stasi's operations beyond East Germany were overseen by Markus Wolf and the Hauptverwaltung Aufklärung (MfS-HVA).

Mielke and Wolf provided money, training, and surveillance equipment to help build pro-Soviet secret police forces in Fidel Castro's Cuba, Baathist Syria, Sandinista-ruled Nicaragua, Mengistu Haile Mariam's Ethiopia, Idi Amin's Uganda, Kwame Nkrumah's Ghana, South Yemen, and the Ministry of Public Security (MPS) in the Socialist Republic of Vietnam.

After the opening of Stasi archives, it was further revealed that West Germany was riddled with MfS-HVA moles. In what John Koehler has dubbed, "The Invisible Invasion", some West German citizens collaborated out of Marxist beliefs, but others were recruited through blackmail, bribery, career frustrations, or sexual favors provided by Stasi operatives.

Another tactic was for Stasi military advisers assigned to African and Middle Eastern countries to request the arrest of West German tourists. Local police would then turn the prisoner over to the Stasi agent, who would offer the West German a choice between espionage or incarceration.

Senior politicians from the Social Democratic Party of Germany, the Free Democratic Party of Germany, and the Christian Democratic Union were exposed and, when still alive, prosecuted.

The 1974 arrest and exposure of Günter Guillaume, a highly placed Stasi mole inside the Social Democratic Party, resulted in the resignation of West Germany Chancellor Willy Brandt and the discrediting of the latter's policy of Ostpolitik.

Mielke and Wolf also seriously compromised West Germany's police departments, foreign and domestic intelligence services, diplomatic corps, military-industrial complex, and journalistic profession.

The Stasi also compromised the United States military and U.S. State Department presence in West Germany. The most damaging American to spy for the Stasi was United States Army Sergeant James Hall III, who volunteered his services to Soviet and East German intelligence in November 1981.

Sergeant Hall sold the Stasi 13,088 pages of classified documents, including detailed information about Project Trojan, a worldwide electronic network with the ability to pinpoint armored vehicles, missiles and aircraft by recording their signal emissions during wartime and the complete National SIGINT Requirements List (NSRL), a 4,258-page document about NSA operations at home and abroad.

In 1988, Sergeant Hall was tricked into confessing his espionage career to an undercover FBI Special Agent named Dimitry Droujinsky, a Russian-American, who was posing as Hall's new KGB handler. When news of Sergeant Hall's arrest became public, one Washington intelligence official called the breach, "the Army's Walker Case."

=== Collusion with Nazism ===
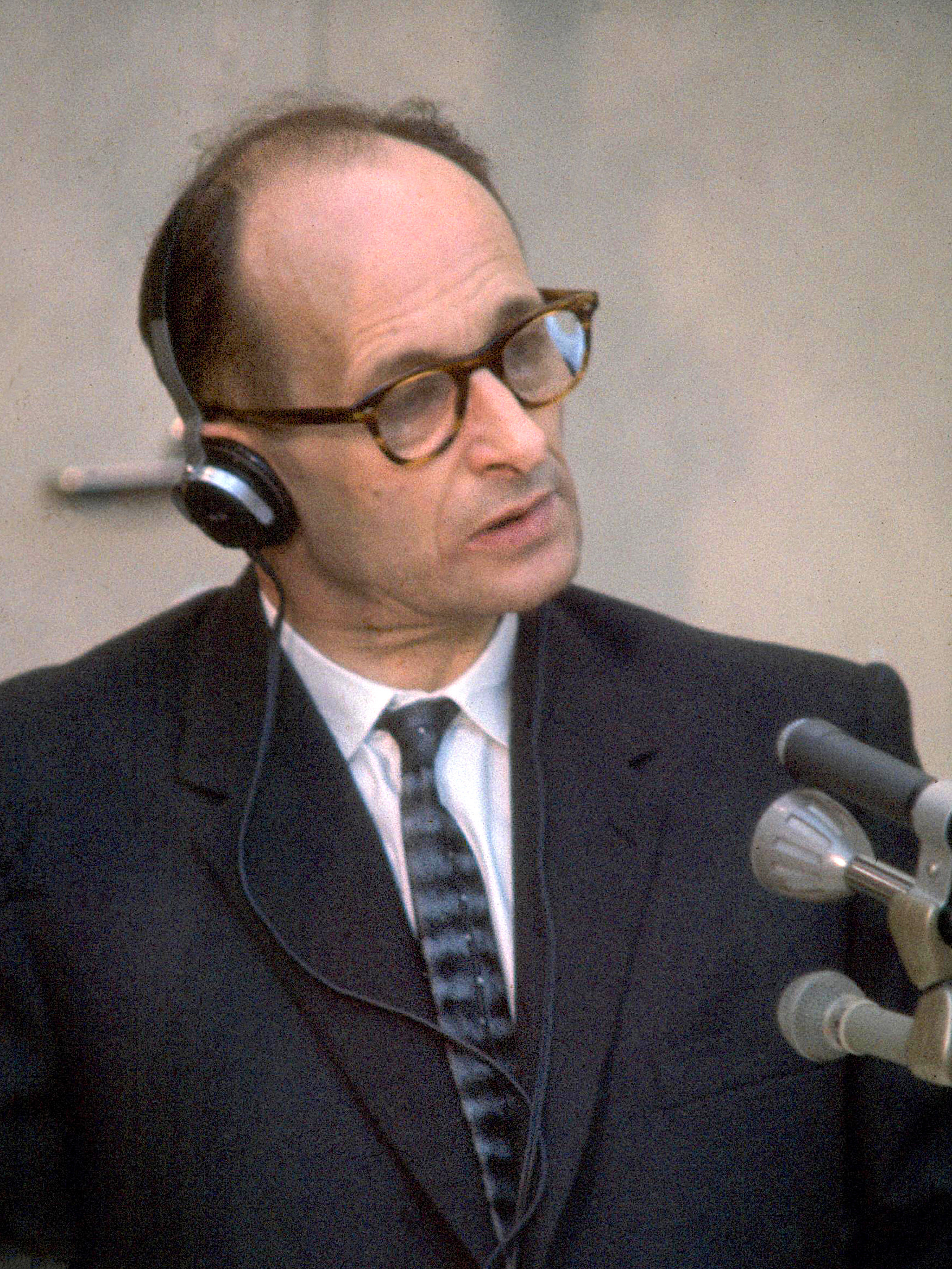
Former SS Lieutenant Colonel Adolf Eichmann during his trial in Jerusalem, 1961

Beginning in 1960, Erich Mielke and Markus Wolf, who was ironically of German Jewish descent, used false flag recruitment to secretly organize and finance neo-Nazi organizations, which they then instructed to vandalize Jewish religious and cultural sites throughout West Germany. During the Jerusalem trial of Adolf Eichmann, Stasi agents sent letters to West German Neo-Nazis and Waffen-SS veterans, urging them to protest the trial and to donate money to pay for Eichmann's defense attorney. This was done in order to lend credibility to Communist propaganda, which alleged throughout the Cold War that West Germany was a Fascist and neo-Nazi country.

According to German Jewish historian Michael Wolffsohn, "There is no doubt that in the 1960s as now, there were Nazis who were unreconstructed, unchangeable and evil, but without the help of East Germany, these Nazis were incapable of a national, coordinated campaign. That was true of right-wing extremist criminals in the 1980s as well. The East German Communists used anything they could against West Germany, including the... fears by Western countries and Jews that a new Nazism could be growing in West Germany. There is ... evidence that the East Germans continued to use Anti-Semitism as a tool against West Germany in the 1970s and perhaps right up until 1989."

=== Support for paramilitary and terrorist groups ===
During a 1979 visit to the GDR by senior PLO member Salah Khalaf, Mielke said, "We are paying great attention to the Palestine resistance and the other revolutionary forces fighting against the policies of the United States and against the provocations of the Israeli aggressor. Together with the Soviet Union and other socialist countries, we will do everything to support this just battle."

With this in mind, Mielke ordered the Stasi to finance, arm, and train, "urban guerrillas," from numerous countries. According to former Stasi Colonel Rainer Wiegand, Mielke's ties to violent paramilitary groups were overseen by Markus Wolf and Department Three of the MfS-HVA. Members of the West German Baader-Meinhoff Group, the Chilean Manuel Rodríguez Patriotic Front, and Umkhonto we Sizwe, the paramilitary wing of the African National Congress, were brought to East Germany for training in the use of military hardware, insurgent tactics, and, "the leadership role of the Party." Similar training was given to Palestinians from the Popular Front for the Liberation of Palestine, Abu Nidal, and Black September.

Other Stasi agents worked as military advisers to Soviet-backed African guerrilla organizations and the governments they later formed. They included the Namibian SWAPO and the Angolan MPLA during the South African Border War, the FRELIMO during the Mozambican War of Independence and civil war, and Robert Mugabe's ZANLA during the Rhodesian Bush War.

Colonel Wiegand revealed that Mielke and Wolf provided bodyguards from the Stasi's counter-terrorism division for Venezuelan-born PLO terrorist Carlos the Jackal and Black September leader Abu Daoud during their visits to the GDR. Col. Wiegand had been sickened by the 1972 Munich massacre and was horrified that the GDR would treat the man who ordered it as an honored guest. When he protested, Wiegand was told that Abu Daoud was, "a friend of our country, a high-ranking political functionary," and that there was no proof that he was a terrorist.

During the 1980s, Wiegand secretly blackmailed a Libyan diplomat into spying on his colleagues. Wiegand's informant told him that the La Belle bombing and other terrorist attacks against American and West German citizens were being planned at the Libyan Embassy in East Berlin. When Wiegand showed him a detailed report, Mielke informed the SED's Politburo, which ordered the Colonel to continue surveillance but not interfere with the plans of the Libyans.

According to John Koehler, "Murder, kidnapping, extortion, bank robbery, and arson were felonies under the East German criminal code. However, if these offenses were committed under the banner of the 'anti-imperialist struggle,' the communist system would look the other way. Moreover, it had assigned the Stasi to make sure that terrorists were properly trained for murder and sowing mayhem. There were no limits to the East German regime's involvement with terrorism, so long as it could be ideologically justified."

== The Peaceful Revolution ==
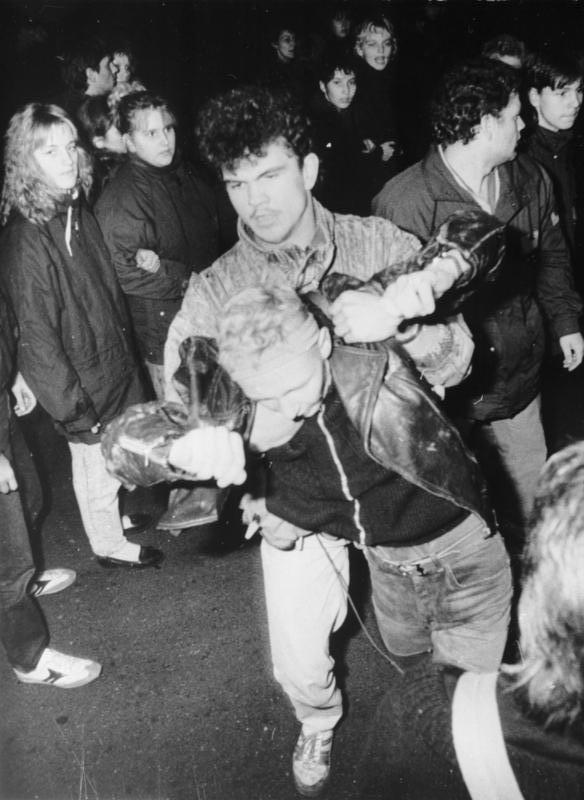
The SED dispatched plainclothes officers to arrest demonstrators (depicted in October 1989, prior to die Wende).

According to John Koehler, "Increasingly concerned over the growing popular opposition, Stasi Minister Mielke early in 1989 ordered the creation of a special elite unit for crushing disturbances. Its personnel were carefully selected members of the counterespionage and counterterrorism directorate. They were equipped with special batons similar to electric cattle prods but much more powerful. In a secret speech to top-ranking Stasi officers on 29 June, Mielke warned that, 'hostile opposing forces and groups have already achieved a measure of power and are using all methods to achieve a change in the balance of power.' Former Stasi Colonel Rainer Wiegand told me he was horrified when Mielke compared the situation with that of China two months earlier. Chinese students in Beijing had begun massive protests in April and in May, during a student demonstration in Tiananmen Square, security troops had opened fire on them killing hundreds. 'Mielke said our situation was comparable and we had to be ready to counter it with all means and methods,' Wiegand recalled. 'Mielke said that the Chinese leadership had succeeded in smothering the protests before the situation got out of hand.'"

On 9 September 1989, Mielke attended the match between BSG Energie Cottbus and BFC Dynamo at the Stadion der Freundschaft in Cottbus, together with fellow Poliburo member Egon Krenz and their entourage. This visit would eventually come to be his last visit to a match of BFC Dynamo as a minister. Mielke was the first chairman of SV Dynamo and had been the honorary chairman of football club BFC Dynamo since its founding 1966.

=== 40th anniversary of the GDR ===
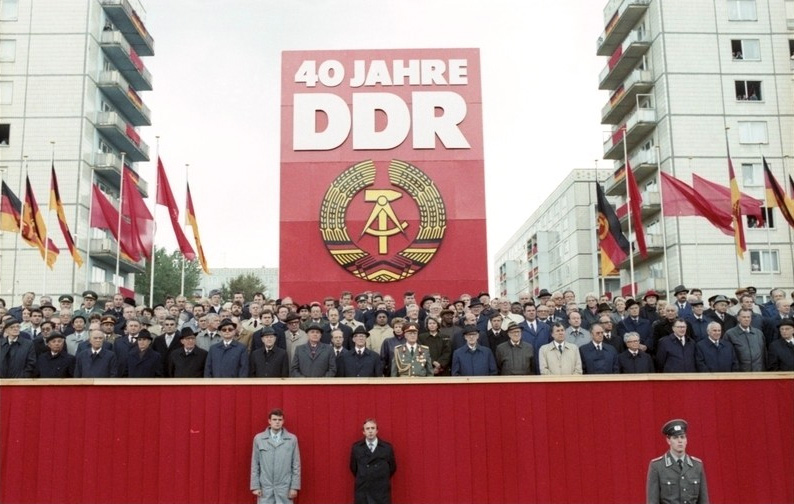
The 40th Anniversary of the GDR, 7 October 1989.

As the fortieth anniversary of the GDR approached, Mielke ordered, "We must stop the internal enemy. At the least hint of a disturbance of the celebration, isolate and arrest them."

One former Stasi Major recalled, "We mixed inconspicuously with the demonstrators, accompanied by our IMs. Hundreds of us stood at the sides of the street in order to stop any activity before it got started. We barely got any sleep toward the end. Never did I sense that the people were afraid of the MfS. The Stasi was more afraid of the people than the people were of them."

According to Koehler, "Despite the unrest, the regime celebrated its fortieth with a huge, pompous ceremony in Berlin on 7 October, while tens of thousands protested outside the ornate building of the State Council. The People's Police cordons were utterly ineffectual. As Stasi Minister Erich Mielke drove up and was greeted by General Günter Kratsch, the counterintelligence chief, Mielke screamed at police: "Club those pigs into submission!" (German: "Hau sie doch zusammen, die Schweine!") The police ignored Mielke's ranting.

As more and more East Germans were arrested for protesting the 40th anniversary celebrations, many of them sang The Internationale in Vopo and Stasi custody to imply that they, rather than their captors, were the real working class and the real revolutionaries.

According to Anna Funder, "There was a sea of red flags, a torchlight procession, and tanks. The old men on the podium wore light-grey suits studded with medals. Mikhail Gorbachev stood next to Honecker, but he looked uncomfortable among the much older Germans. He had come to tell them that it was over, to convince the leadership to adopt his reformist policies. He had spoken openly about the danger of not 'responding to reality.' He pointedly told the Politburo that, 'life punishes those who come too late.' Honecker and Mielke ignored him, just as they ignored the crowds when they chanted, "Gorby, help us! Gorby, help us!"

=== Plan X ===
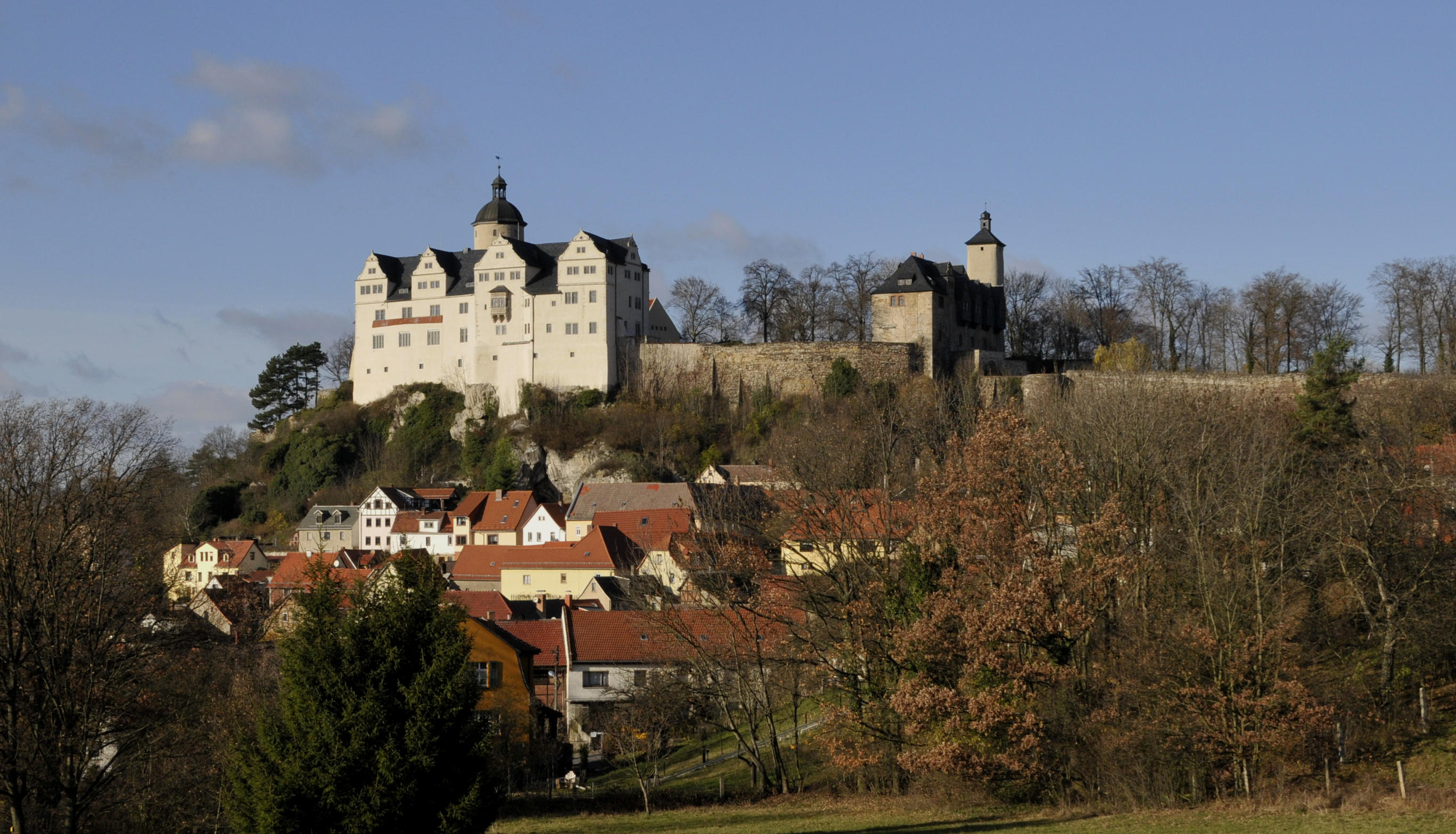
Ranis Castle in Thuringia was among the locations selected for an internment camp under Plan X. In Stasi documents, it was referred to as "Rosebush" (German: Rosenstock).

On 8 October 1989, Mielke and Honecker ordered the Stasi to implement "Plan X"—the SED's plan to arrest and indefinitely detain 85,939 East Germans during a state of emergency. According to John Koehler, Plan X had been in preparation since 1979 and was, "a carbon copy of how the Nazi concentration camps got their start after Hitler came to power in 1933."

By 1984, 23 sites had been selected for "isolation and internment camps." Those who were to be imprisoned in them ran into six categories, including anyone who had ever been under surveillance for anti-state activities, including all members of peace movements which were not under Stasi control.

According to Anna Funder, "The plans contained exact provisions for the use of all available prisons and camps, and when those were full for the conversion of other buildings: Nazi detention centers, schools, hospitals, and factory holiday hostels. Every detail was foreseen, from where the doorbell was located on the house of each person to be arrested to the adequate supply of barbed wire and the rules of dress and etiquette in the camps ..."

However, when Mielke sent the orders, codenamed "Shield" (German: Schild), to each local Stasi precinct to begin the planned arrests, he was not obeyed. Terrified of an East German version of the mass lynchings of Hungarian secret police agents during the 1956 Revolution, Stasi agents throughout the GDR fortified their office-buildings and barricaded themselves inside.

=== Toppling Honecker ===
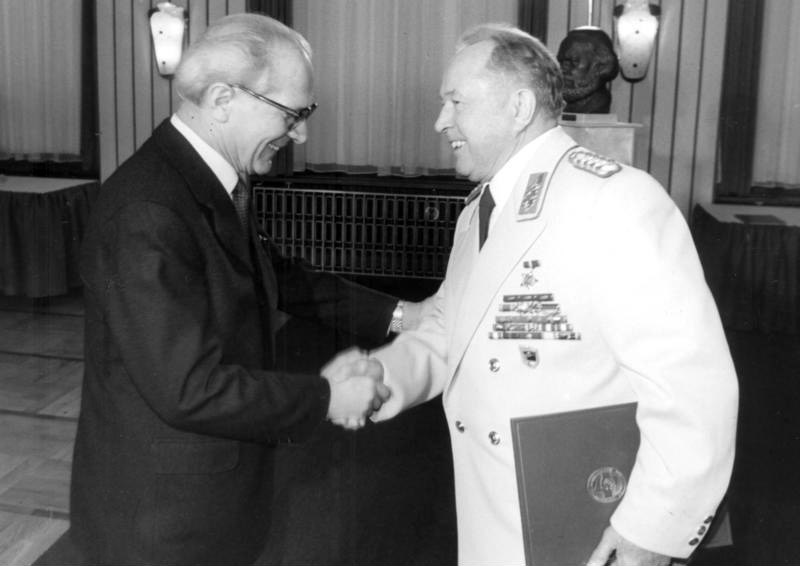
Mielke receives an award from Erich Honecker 8 February 1980.

Even as orders were going out to implement Plan X, Mielke had already thrown his support behind a faction in the SED's Politburo that sought to oust Honecker. Although Mielke was of the same generation as Honecker and had matured in an environment where following orders was the rule, he was sober enough and politically savvy enough to realize this approach no longer worked. During a session on 10 October 1989, Mielke delivered a report attacking Honecker's desire to violently suppress the demonstrations rather than implement Glasnost and Perestroika in the GDR.

In what Edward N. Peterson has called "a remarkable disclaimer of responsibility for the violence," Mielke declared that Honecker's orders to the Stasi "were built on false situation judgments." He added that Honecker's commands on 7 and 8 October "were false and undifferentiated condemnations of those who think differently. Despite this evaluation, there was never any instructions to use violence against persons. There is nothing in our basic principles to consider a demonstration as part of a possible counterrevolutionary coup."

Mielke also claimed that "the Party judged the situation falsely. We tried to tell them the true situation, but enough was not done." Mielke argued in favor of solving the demonstrations politically and giving "every DDR citizen the right to travel."

On 17 October 1989, Mielke and the rest of the GDR's Politburo met to follow Gorbachev's demand, voiced in August, to remove Honecker as General Secretary of the SED and State Council chairman. Suspecting that Honecker's personal bodyguards might try to arrest the members of the Central Committee when they met to vote Honecker out in favour of Egon Krenz, Mielke saw to it that Stasi agents who were loyal to him were stationed near the meeting room. While deliberations were underway, Mielke told Honecker that "we simply cannot start shooting with tanks," and tried to impress upon Honecker that it was "the end".

After the vote to oust Honecker passed, Mielke "got nasty," and accused Honecker of corruption. Honecker responded that Mielke should not open his mouth so much. Mielke responded by putting the last nail into Honecker's coffin. He announced that the Stasi had a file on the now-ousted Premier. It contained proof of Honecker's corrupt business practices, allegedly deviant sexual activities, and how, as a member of the underground Communist Party of Germany during the Nazi years, he had been arrested by the Gestapo and had named names.

To the shock of both the Politburo and the Stasi, Krenz's first televised addresses failed to win popular support. Despite his assurances that the SED was at last ready to embrace Gorbachev's reformist policies, Krenz's approval ratings remained extremely low.

Former Politburo member Günter Schabowski later recalled, "We made a palace revolution without offering a real alternative... We had not quickly and thoroughly enough whittled away from Stalin's methods."

=== Defeat ===
On 7 November 1989, Mielke resigned, along with eleven out of eighteen members of the SED's Council of Ministers, in response to the increasing disintegration of the GDR.

Two days later, Schabowski announced on television that the east–west border was open without restriction.

According to Anna Funder, there was panic at Stasi Headquarters in Berlin-Lichtenberg, "Stasi officers were instructed to destroy files, starting with the most incriminating—those naming westerners who spied for them, and those that concerned deaths. They shredded the files until the paper shredders overheated and shorted out. Among other shortages in the East, there was a shredder shortage, so they had to send agents out under cover to West Berlin to buy more. In Building 8 alone, the citizens' movement found over a hundred burnt out shredders. When they ran out of working shredders from the West and could not procure more they began using scissors to cut the documents by hand.

According to William F. Buckley, Jr., "In the weeks after 9 November, Stasi offices were stormed in various cities around East Germany. Stasi commissars in three of those cities committed suicide. But not one was lynched or executed."

=== Televised humiliation ===
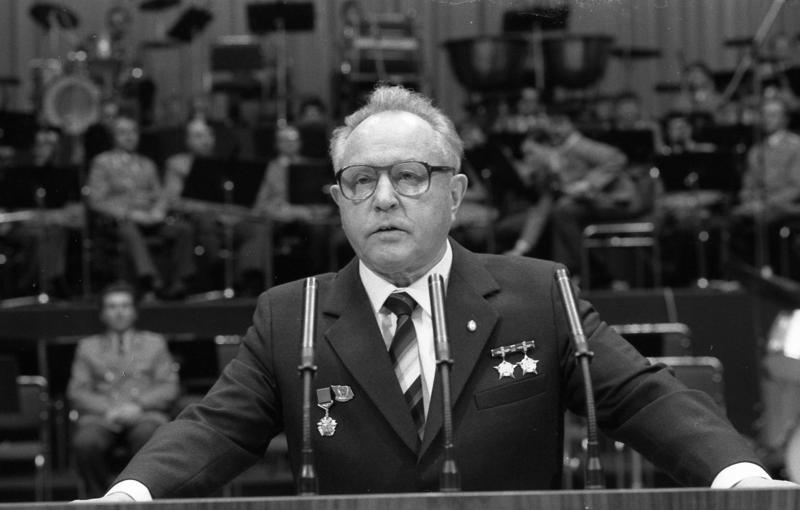
Mielke addressing the SV Dynamo, 25 March 1983. The Horst Krüger-Band set up in the background.

On 13 November 1989, Mielke was summoned to deliver a briefing about the protests to the GDR parliament, or Volkskammer. Formerly a "rubber stamp parliament," the disintegration of the SED's power had allowed the Volkskammer to begin exercising real authority over the GDR. Therefore, Mielke, as the head of the Stasi (known as the "shield and sword of the [SED] party"), was summoned before the newly empowered parliament to justify his position in government.

As his speech was broadcast live, Mielke began by using overly bombastic, flag-waving language, saying "We have, comrades, dear assembly members, an extraordinarily high amount of contact with all working people." (German: "Wir haben, Genossen, liebe Abgeordnete, einen außerordentlich hohen Kontakt zu allen werktätigen Menschen.") To his shock, the Volkskammer responded with boos, whistles, and catcalls.

His face grief-stricken and pale, Mielke then tried to defuse the situation, "Yes, we have such contact, let me tell you— let me tell you why. I am not afraid to stand here and to give you an unbiased answer." (German: "Ja, wir haben den Kontakt, ihr werdet gleich hören— ihr werdet gleich hören, warum. Ich fürchte mich nicht, ohne Rededisposition hier Antwort zu stehen.") Mielke continued, speaking of the "triumph" of the socialist economy, continuing all the while to address the members of the Volkskammer as "Comrades" (German: "Genossen"). In response, Volkskammer member Dietmar Czok of the Christian Democratic Union, rose from his seat and raised his hand. The Volkskammer's president, Günther Maleuda, interrupted Mielke and urged Czok to speak.

With his voice dripping with contempt, Czok told Mielke, "As a point of order, I will not tell you this again. There are more people sitting in this Chamber than just your Comrades!" (German: "Zur Geschäftsordnung: Ich bitte doch endlich dafür zu sorgen. In dieser Kammer sitzen nicht nur Genossen!"). In response, many in the Volkskammer burst into applause, cheers, and shouts of "We are not your Comrades!" (German: "Wir sind nicht deine Genossen!").

Trying to appear magnanimous, Mielke responded, "This is a natural, humanistic question! This is just a question of formality." (German: Das ist doch nur 'ne natürliche, menschliche Frage! Das ist doch nur eine formale Frage!"), leading to further shouts of displeasure from the members of the Volkskammer. In a last ditch effort, Mielke "raised his arms like an evangelist," and cried, "I love all— all humanity! I really do! I'm committed to it!" (German: "Ich liebe— Ich liebe doch alle— alle Menschen! Ich liebe doch! Ich setze mich doch dafür ein!")

Everyone in the room, including staunch SED members such as Egon Krenz and Günter Schabowski, burst out laughing, with some also pointing at him or making obscene gestures. John Koehler later wrote, "Mielke was finished."

Mielke's address to the Volkskammer remains the most famous broadcast in the history of German television. Anna Funder has written, "When they think of Mielke, East Germans like to think of this."

=== The Fall ===
On 17 November 1989, the Volkskammer renamed the MfS the Amt für Nationale Sicherheit (AfNS – Office for National Security). The following day, Mielke's tenure in office ended when the Volkskammer appointed Generalleutnant Wolfgang Schwanitz as the new director of the AfNS.

On 1 December 1989 the Volkskammer revoked the clause of the GDR constitution that declared the GDR to be a socialist state under the leadership of the SED, formally ending Communist rule in East Germany. Two days later, the SED announced that Mielke's party membership had been permanently revoked. Years later, he lamented, "Millions have died for nothing. Everything we fought for – it has all amounted to nothing." He also said, "If the party had given me the task, then there would perhaps still be a GDR today. On that you can rely."

== Prosecution ==
=== Indictments ===
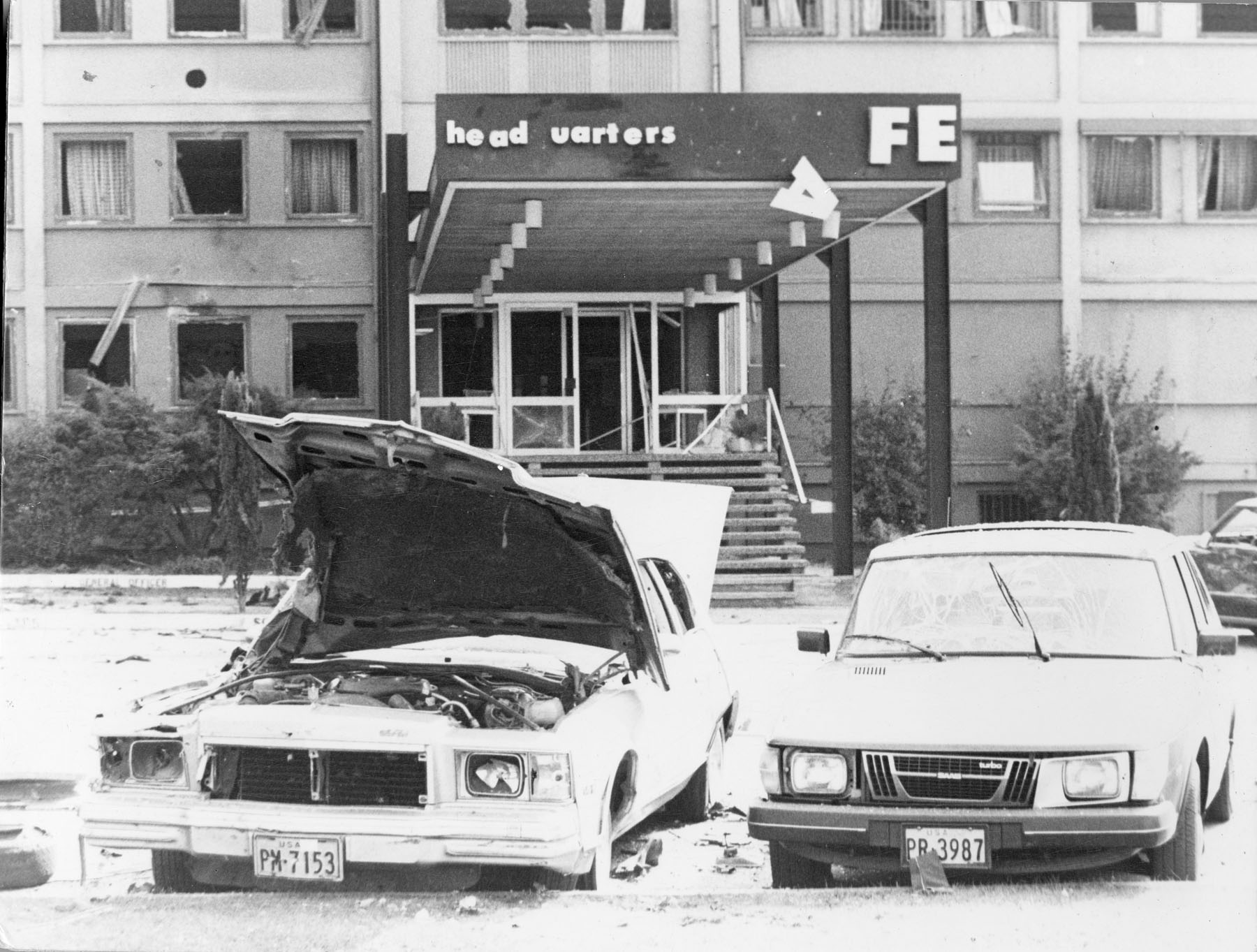
Aftermath of the Baader-Meinhoff Group's bombing attack on Ramstein Air Base, 31 August 1981.

On 7 December 1989, Erich Mielke was arrested and taken into solitary confinement for embezzlement of public funds in order to improve his hunting estate. He was charged with "Damaging the People's Economy" (German: Schädigung der Volkswirtschaft). Mielke was initially imprisoned in the Hohenschönhausen Prison Complex and investigated by the East German military prosecutor's office. On 7 January 1990, he was further charged with high treason (German: Hochverrat) and conspiring with Erich Honecker to bug the telephones and open the mail of every one of East Germany's citizens.

Mielke was released on 9 March 1990 for being unfit for imprisonment. However, he was imprisoned again three months later. In May 1990, the East German Attorney general took over the investigation. On 26 July 1990, Mielke was arrested again. Mielke was now indicted for having ordered the shootings of defectors at the Berlin Wall. He would also be charged with misuse of office, breach of trust, and incitement to pervert the course of justice. Mielke spent time at the Rummelsburg prison and then at the Plötzensee Prison, before he was sent to the Moabit Prison, where he would remain for a longer time.

In the meanwhile, the Federal Constitutional Court announced that Mielke had also been indicted for having ordered two terrorist attacks by the Baader-Meinhoff Group against United States military personnel who were stationed on West German soil. The first was the car bomb attack against the United States Air Force at Ramstein Air Base on 31 August 1981. The second was the attempted murder with an RPG-7 anti-tank rocket of United States Army General Frederick Kroesen, his wife, and the West German Federal Police (BKA) officer who was driving their armored Mercedes at Heidelberg on 15 September 1981.

=== Bülowplatz trial ===
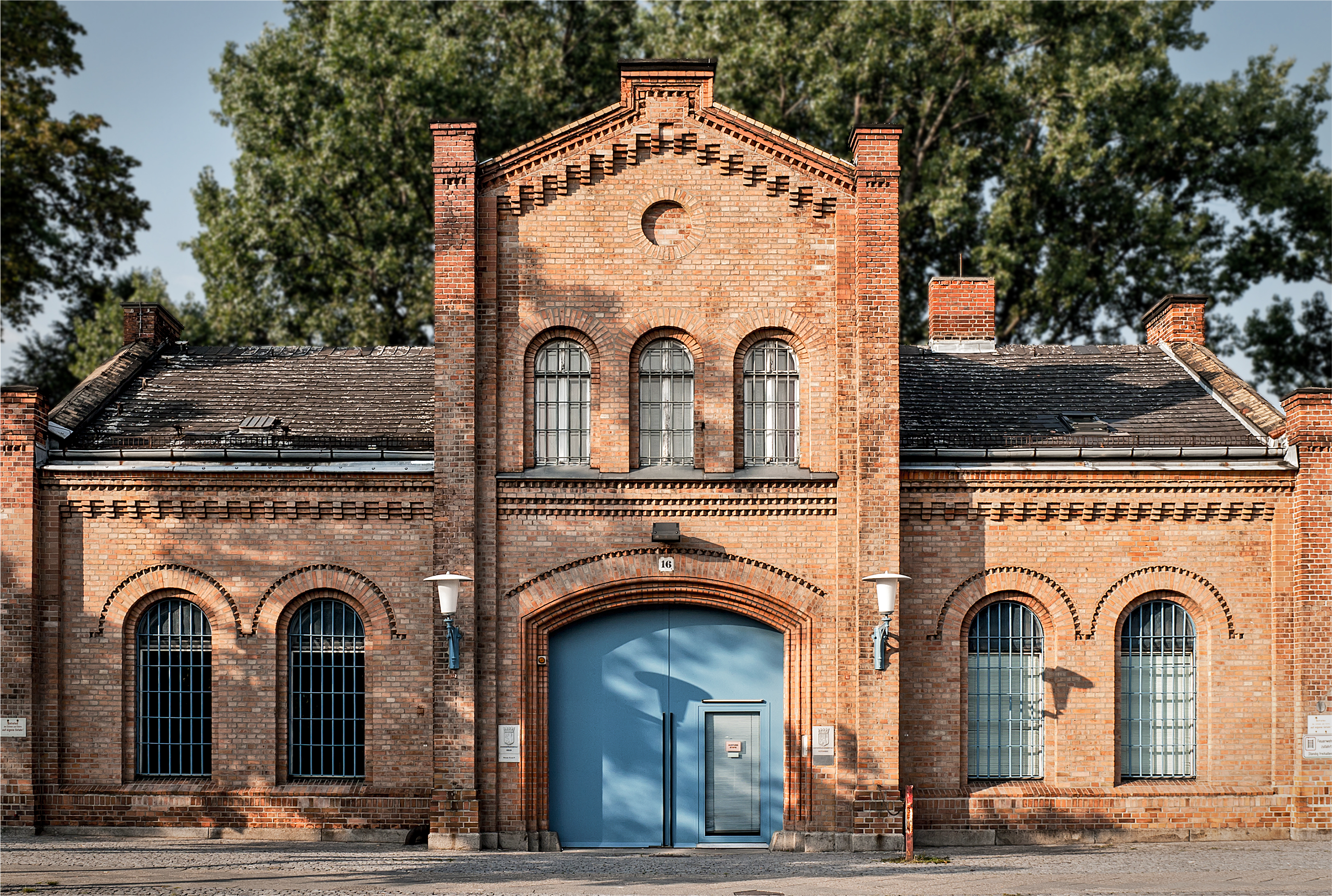
Plötzensee Prison, where Erich Mielke served his pre-trial detention, 1989–1993.

In February 1992, Mielke was put on trial for his role in the Bülowplatz Affair (the 1931 murders of Berlin Police Captains Anlauf and Lenck as well as the attempted murder of Senior Sergeant Willig). The evidence for Mielke's guilt was drawn from the original police files, the transcripts from the 1934 trial of his co-conspirators, and a handwritten memoir in which Mielke revealed that his role in the Bülowplatz murders had been his reason for fleeing to Moscow from the Weimar Republic in 1931. All had been found in Mielke's house safe during a police search in 1990. Mielke was believed to have kept the documents for the purpose of "blackmailing Honecker and other East German leaders." Former Associated Press reporter and White House Press Secretary John Koehler also testified that Mielke had boasted of his involvement in the Bülowplatz murders during a confrontation at Leipzig in 1965.

During his trial, Mielke appeared increasingly senile, admitting his identity but otherwise remaining silent, taking naps, and showing little interest in the proceedings. In a widely publicized incident, Mielke appeared to mistake the presiding judge for a prison barber. When a journalist for Der Spiegel attempted to interview him in Plötzensee Prison, Mielke responded, "I want to go back to my bed" (German: "Ich möchte in mein Bett zurück."). Opinion was divided whether Mielke was suffering from senile dementia or was pretending in order to evade prosecution.

After twenty months of one-and-a-half-hour daily sessions, Erich Mielke was convicted on two counts of murder and one of attempted murder. On 26 October 1993, a panel of three judges and two jurors sentenced him to six years' imprisonment. At his sentencing, Mielke started to cry. In pronouncing sentence, Judge Theodor Seidel, told Mielke that he "will go down in history as one of the most fearsome dictators and police ministers of the 20th century."

=== Imprisonment ===
In one of the most highly anticipated of the Mauerschützenprozesse, Mielke was then put on trial for ordering the shootings of East Germans who were trying to defect to the West. In November 1994, the presiding judge adjourned the proceedings, ruling that Mielke was not mentally competent to stand trial.

During his incarceration, at JVA Moabit corrections officers supplied Mielke with a red telephone like the one in his office at Stasi Headquarters. Although it was not connected to the outside world, Mielke enjoyed having imaginary conversations with non-existent Stasi agents. His other favorite pastime was watching game shows on television.

In 1995, parole officers and Mielke's attorneys argued that he was "totally confused" and obtained his release. At 87 years of age, Erich Mielke was Germany's oldest prison inmate and had been incarcerated for 1,904 days. Days before his release, the Public Prosecutor of Berlin announced that he was "not interested in chasing an 87-year-old man anymore" and that all further prosecution of Mielke had been indefinitely suspended. In an interview with John O. Koehler, former Stasi political prisoner Werner Juretzko commented resignedly about the leniency the post-1989 German legal system has shown to East German officials who were guilty of crimes against humanity, "I guess the Germans have lost their balls."

According to Koehler, "[Mielke's] bank account, which held more than 300,000 Marks (about US$187,500), was confiscated. Before his arrest in 1989, the most feared man in East Germany had lived in a luxurious home with access to an indoor pool. In addition, he owned a palatial hunting villa, complete with a movie theater, trophy room, 60 servants, and a 60-square-kilometre (23 sq mi) hunting preserve."

Koehler continued, "After he was released from prison Mielke was obliged to move into a two-room, 55-square-meter flat. Like all Stasi pensioners, he would henceforth have to live on 802 marks (about US$512) a month." There he lived a secluded life together with his wife Gertrud. On Christmas Day, he attended services in the nearby Protestant parish in the locality of Wartenberg. Mielke's apartment, with number 4.03, was located on the fourth floor in a cookie cutter 16-storey plattenbau on Prendener Straße 92 in today's locality of Neu-Hohenschönhausen in the borough of Lichtenberg in former East Berlin.

== Death ==
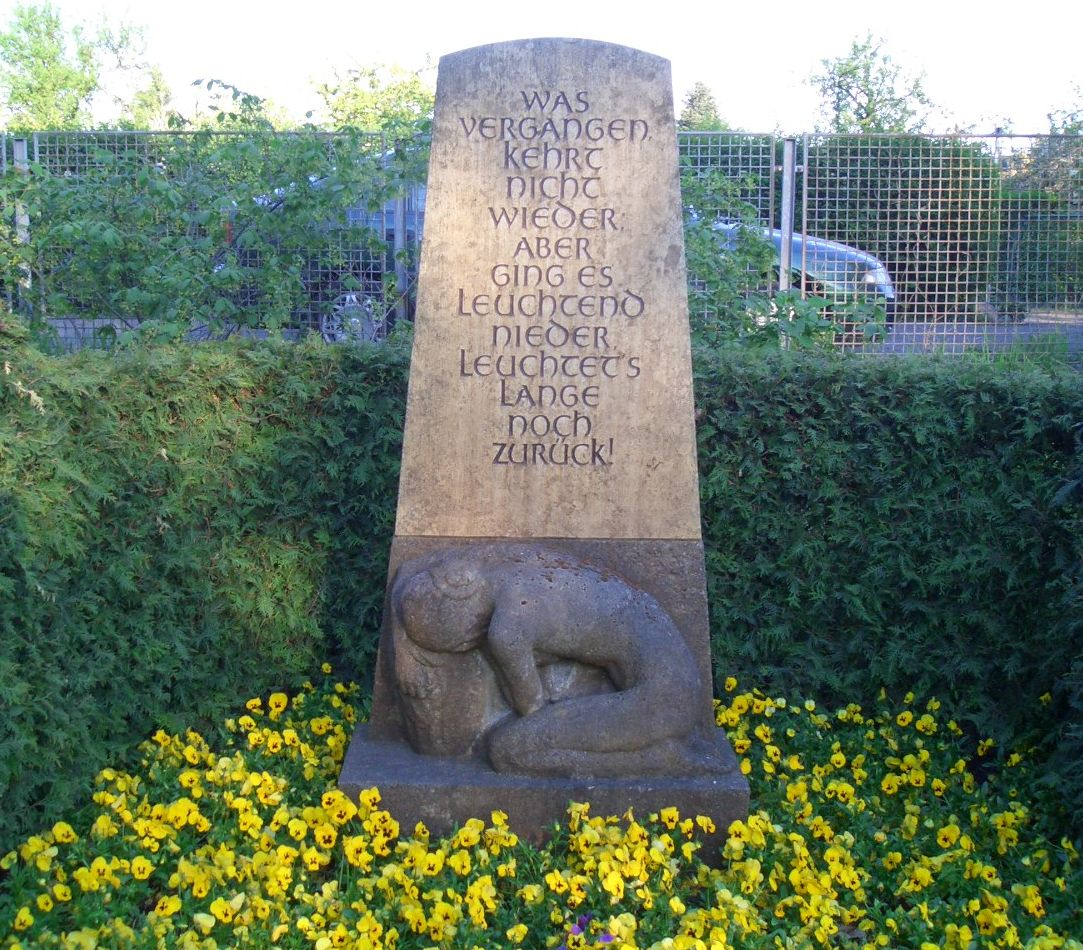
Mielke's grave.

Erich Mielke died on 21 May 2000, aged 92, in a Berlin nursing home in Neu-Hohenschönhausen. After being cremated at the crematorium in Meissen, an urn containing Mielke's ashes was buried in an unmarked grave at the Zentralfriedhof Friedrichsfelde in Berlin. An estimated 100 people reportedly attended the funeral. Erich Mielke's grave is outside the memorial section established at the entrance in 1951 by East German leaders for communist heroes. Within hours of his funeral, the flowers and wreaths left at Mielke's grave were ripped to shreds by persons unknown.

== Legacy ==
Writing in 2003, Australian journalist Anna Funder declared, "The name Mielke has now come to mean 'Stasi.' Victims are dubiously honored to find his signature in their files: on plans for someone to be observed 'with all possible methods', on commands for arrest, for kidnapping, instructions to judges for sentencing, orders for 'liquidation'. The honor is dubious because... he signed so many."

In 2012, the museum at the former Stasi headquarters opened Mielke's office as a permanent exhibit. Soon after, The Guardian correspondent Tam Eastley visited the exhibit and numerous sites in Berlin connected to Mielke's life, times, and legacy. When she visited Mielke's grave, Eastley found that it had become a shrine for adherents of Ostalgie.

== Sports ==
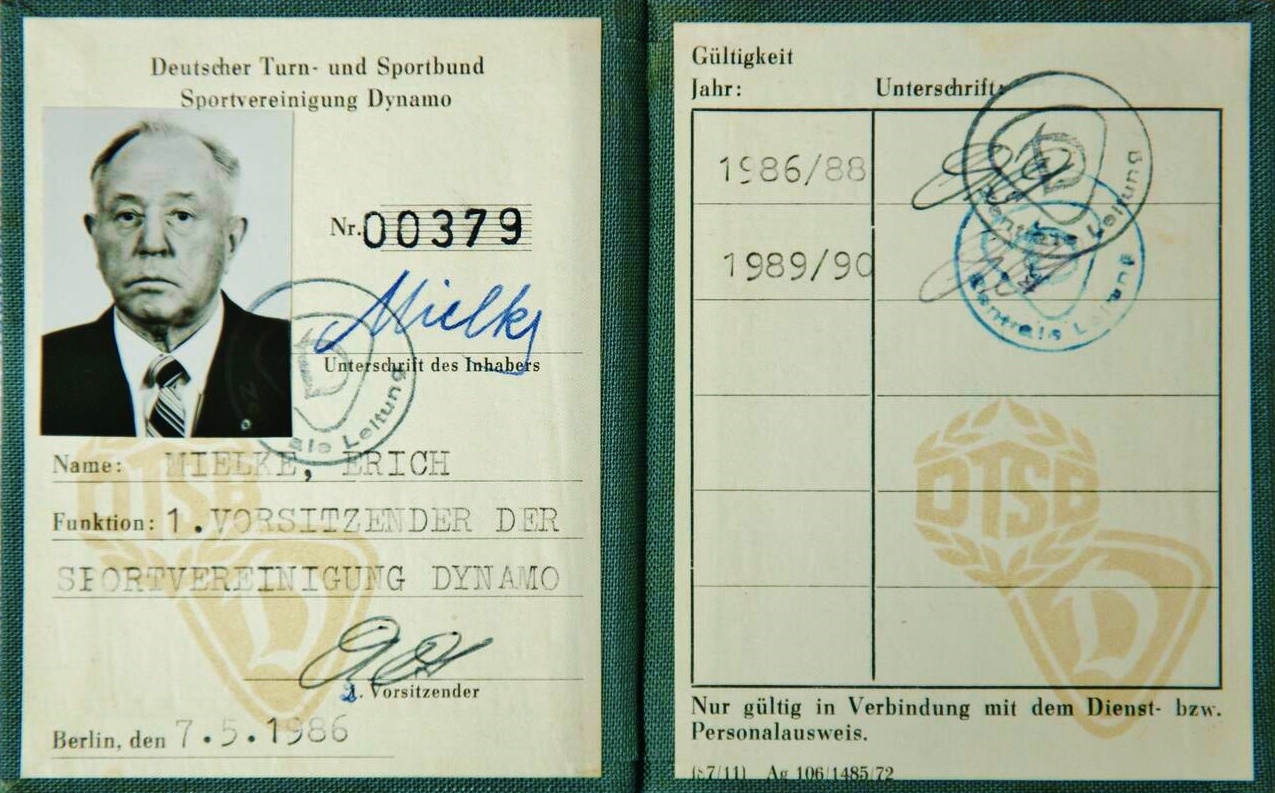
The service card of Erich Mielke as the First chairman of SV Dynamo, from 1986.

Mielke was the president of sports association SV Dynamo from its founding in 1953 until 1989. The sports association would eventually include as many as 278,000 members and 380 sports communities. As the president of SV Dynamo, Mielke was one of the most important politicians in East German sports, alongside Manfred Ewald and Rudolf Hellmann. BFC Dynamo was known to be his favourite football team. He was elected honorary chairman at the club's founding in 1966 and barely missed a home match of the team. Mielke was also a keen supporter of ice hockey. His favourite ice hockey team was SC Dynamo Berlin, today known as Eisbären Berlin.

East Germany had the world's smallest ice hockey league for a long time. The sport was demoted in 1970 following the 1969 Competitive Sports Resolution (German: Leistungssportbeschluss). Ice hockey was considered too expensive in relation to the expected medal yield. Funding for ice hockey was halted and the DDR-Oberliga risked being shut down. However, ice hockey enthusiast Mielke intervened against this development to ensure that the sport could continue. As a result, a compromise was reached and the DDR-Oberliga was allowed to continue operate with two teams affiliated to SV Dynamo: SC Dynamo Berlin and SG Dynamo Weißwasser.

Mielke worked to preserve ice hockey in East Germany and defended the sport on several occasions against the president of the German Gymnastics and Sports Federation (DTSB) Manfred Ewald. Mielke is said to have said the following to Ewald in 1986: "I know, comrade Ewald, that you are against ice hockey, but I am for it. It's a beautiful sport that inspires the masses and the players too, and that's why they should play". The DDR-Oberliga continued to operate as a championship between SC Dynamo Berlin and SG Dynamo Weißwasser until 1990. Both teams survived the end of East Germany and were eventually admitted into the 1990–91 Bundesliga.

== Personal life ==
Erich Mielke was a fitness enthusiast, a non-smoker, and drank very little. He was a keen hunter and owned a large area of ground where he would hunt animals with other East German and visiting Soviet officials.

During the late 1940s, when Mielke was working as security chief of the DWK, he began a relationship with Gertrud Müller, a seamstress. On 18 December 1948, shortly after the birth of their son Frank Mielke, Erich and Gertrud married in a civil ceremony in the Wedding section of Berlin.

According to the newspaper Bild, the Mielkes adopted an orphaned girl named Ingrid, who was born in 1950. Like the Mielkes' son Frank, Ingrid Mielke attended the Wilhelm Pieck School. She ultimately became a captain in the Stasi and married a Stasi Lieutenant named Norbert Knappe. As of 1999, the Knappes had both refused to grant an interview to Bild reporters.

== In popular culture ==
Erich Mielke has appeared as a character in both films and novels set in the GDR.

- Volker Schlöndorff's The Legend of Rita (2000), which focuses on Stasi collusion with the West German far-left terrorist organization Rote Armee Fraktion (RAF). In conversation with fictional Stasi officer Erwin Hull, Mielke (played by Dietrich Körner) expresses admiration for the RAF's campaign against the United States, West Germany, and the State of Israel, which he compares with his own activities against the Weimar Republic and the Nazis. The RAF members are then brought to a training camp, where Stasi agents instruct them in the use of grenade launchers and other kinds of military hardware. Mielke's name is never disclosed and Agent Hull addresses him only as, "Comrade General". (German: "Genosse General")
- Florian Henckel von Donnersmarck's The Lives of Others (2006), which focuses on the Stasi's surveillance and repression of the East German population. In the film, a previously loyal GDR playwright named Georg Dreymann publishes an anonymous article in the West German magazine Der Spiegel which accuses East Germany's Minister of Culture of having persecuted a blacklisted stage director until he hanged himself. Soon after the article goes to press, Mielke's voice is heard over the telephone giving a dressing down to fictional Stasi Lieutenant Colonel Anton Grubitz. Addressed only as "Genosse Armeegeneral" (Mielke was the only person in the Stasi to ever hold that rank), Mielke threatens to throw Grubitz in front of a firing squad if he fails to identify and arrest the article's author.
- In Philip Kerr's novel Field Grey (2010), Mielke first appears in 1931 Berlin, when protagonist Bernie Gunther saves him from being murdered by Nazi Brownshirts. The novel then flashes forward to 1954, when Gunther is recruited into a CIA plot to abduct Mielke from East Berlin.
- Jens Becker and Maarten van der Duin's docudrama Erich Mielke - Master of Fear (2015) focuses on Mielke's personality, his role in the creation of the Stasi and his work as a minister. The film depicts Mielke at the height of his power in 1989, as well as his imprisonment in 1991. In the film, Mielke is portrayed by German actor Kaspar Eichel.
- Mielke is portrayed by Gunnar Helm in the German TV Series Kleo (2022), where he is shown to have been killed in 1990 by the protagonist, a former Stasi agent who blames him for being framed up and imprisoned.

== Honours and awards ==
Mielke received a large number of awards and commemorative medals from organisations within the German Democratic Republic and from allied states. A more complete list is available (in German) at Liste der Orden und Ehrenzeichen des Erich Mielke.

Awards of the German Democratic Republic

- Patriotic Order of Merit in gold (7 October 1954)
- Six Orders of Karl Marx (28 December 1957, 20 November 1973, 1 December 1975, 28 December 1977, 28 June 1982, 28 December 1982)
- Twice Hero of Labour of the GDR (5 October 1964, 24 February 1968)
- Twice Hero of the GDR (1 December 1975, 28 December 1982)
- Banner of Labour (8 May 1960)
- Medal for Exemplary Border Service (26 April 1956)
- Medal for Faithful Service in the National People's Army;
  - Bronze (7 October 1957)
  - Silver (8 February 1959)
  - Gold (1 July 1960)
  - Gold for 20 years service (8 February 1965)
- Medal for Fighters Against Fascism (6 September 1958)
- Gold Medal of Merit of the National People's Army (1 March 1957)
- Scharnhorst Order, twice (25 September 1979, 7 October 1984)

Awards of the Soviet Union

- Hero of the Soviet Union (25 December 1987)
- Four Orders of Lenin (12 June 1973, 28 December 1982, 1 April 1985, 28 December 1987)
- Order of the Patriotic War, 1st class (6 May 1970)
- Four Orders of the Red Banner (23 October 1958, 5 February 1968, 28 December 1977, February 1980)
- Jubilee Medal "50 Years of the Soviet Militia" (20 December 1967)
- Jubilee Medal "In Commemoration of the 100th Anniversary since the Birth of Vladimir Il'ich Lenin" (1970)
- Medal "For Distinction in Guarding the State Border of the USSR" (6 January 1970)
- Order of the October Revolution (February 1975)

Other states

- Order of Georgi Dimitrov (Bulgaria, 28 December 1982)
- Order of Friendship (Czechoslovakia) (28 December 1982)
- Order of the Red Star (Czechoslovakia) (16 November 1970)
