= Josef Kiefel =

Josef Kiefel (2 October 1909 – 11 March 1988) was a German communist who participated in the German Resistance against Hitler and fought with Soviet partisans against the Nazis. After the creation of East Germany in 1949, Kiefel served as a Stasi officer.

== Biography ==
Kiefel was born on 2 October 1909 into the family of a German farm worker. As a longtime member of the Communist Party of Germany, he fled to the Soviet Union during the Nazis' rise to power in the early 1930s. During the Second World War he was trained as a combat intelligence officer and was decorated by the Soviets for his work with partisan units against the Nazi forces. In 1944 he was airdropped behind German lines and continued the war operating from southern Poland and Czechoslovakia.

Following the war, Kiefel assisted Karl Kleinjung with establishing the East German state security infrastructure in the northernmost East German province of Mecklenburg-Vorpommern. He served as head of Stasi's counterintelligence department from 1953 to 1960 and died in 1988 after a successful career in East Germany.
