= Rosa Luxemburg (disambiguation) =

Rosa Luxemburg (1871–1919) was a Polish-German Marxist theorist, socialist philosopher, and revolutionary.

Rosa Luxemburg can also refer to:

- Rosa Luxemburg (film), a 1986 film based on her life
- Rosa-Luxemburg-Platz, a square in Berlin-Mitte, Germany
- Rosa Luxemburg Foundation, a German research foundation
- Rosa-Luxemburg-Straße (Berlin), a street in Berlin
- Rosa-Luxemburg-Straße (Frankfurt am Main), a major road in Frankfurt am Main
- Rosa-Luxemburg-Platz (Berlin U-Bahn), a Berlin U-Bahn station
