= Hans Kippenberger =

German politician (1898–1937)

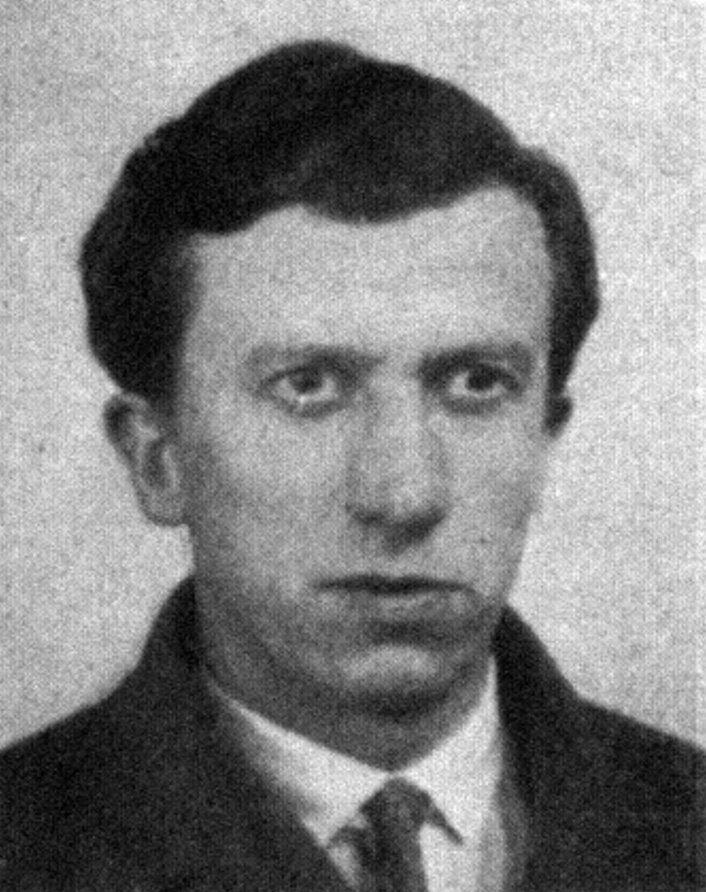
- Official Reichstag portrait, c. 1930

Member of the Reichstag for Leipzig
- In office 1 July 1928 – 28 February 1933
- Preceded by: Multi-member district
- Succeeded by: Constituency abolished

Personal details
- Born: 15 January 1898 Leipzig, Kingdom of Saxony, German Empire
- Died: 3 October 1937 (aged 39) Moscow, Soviet Union
- Cause of death: Execution by shooting
- Party: USPD (1919–1920); KPD (after 1920)
- Spouse: Thea Niemand (m. 1923; div. 1930)
- Children: Margot; Jeanette
- Education: University of Hamburg
- Occupation: Politician; Revolutionary; Foreign Correspondent; Bank Clerk

Military service
- Allegiance: German Empire; Revolutionaries
- Branch/service: Imperial German Army; Antimilitärischer Apparat
- Years of service: 1915–1918; 1923
- Rank: Oberleutnant
- Battles/wars: World War I; Western Front (WIA); Hamburg Uprising
- Central institution membership: 1929–1935: Candidate member, KPD Central Committee; Other offices held: 1924–1927: Member, Hamburg Parliament

Hans Kippenberger (15 January 1898 – 3 October 1937) was a German communist politician who led the Antimilitärischer Apparat, the intelligence arm of the Communist Party of Germany, for most of the Weimar era. He also served as a member of the Reichstag from 1928 and 1933.

Like many other party members at the time, he also operated under "party names" by which he may be identified in sources. They included "A. Neuberg", "Leo Wolf" and "Ernst Wolf".

== Early life ==
Hans Kippenberger was born in Leipzig. His father was a lay preacher. He attended school up to the middle level and then became an intern at a printing machine factory, also in Leipzig, shortly afterwards embarking on a traineeship for bank work.

In 1915, Kippenberger volunteered for military service and spent the rest of the First World War in the Imperial German Army. He served on the Western Front, was wounded several times and was decorated with the Iron Cross First Class. When Kippenberger was discharged in January 1919, he had reached the rank of Oberleutnant.

Early in 1919, he embarked on a commercial traineeship. which led to a clerical job in Leipzig. From June 1921, he was based in Hamburg, employed as a foreign languages correspondent for various firms and working with the English, French, Italian and Spanish languages.

== Radicalization ==
Kippenberger had already in Leipzig joined the Independent Social Democratic Party of Germany, and when that broke apart, he was part of the pro-Soviet faction that joined with the newly-formed Communist Party of Germany. By 1922, he was employed full-time by the party as part of what one source identifies as the party's "secret apparatus" (AM Apparat).

Meanwhile, he attended lectures at the University of Hamburg on socioeconomics although it is not clear that he was formally enrolled as a student at the university.

He became a leader in the Communist Party student group and played a leading role in the Hamburg Uprising, which erupted in October 1923. In the city's politically-left-wing Barmbek quarter, Kippenberger led a fighting group of workers and also managed to plant communist moles into Hamburg police and Reichswehr units.

It was thanks to his careful oversight and military training that the communist fighter groups retreated in good order. Although Kippenberger was elected to the regional Hamburg Parliament in 1924, the Hamburg Uprising made the public prosecutor of Hamburg issue a warrant for his arrest. Badly wounded, Kippenberger lived for several months illegally (unregistered with the local city hall) in Leipzig until March 1924, when he fled to the Soviet Union.

While living in Moscow, Kippenberger was personally recruited by General Yan Karlovich Berzin into the Soviet military intelligence service, the GRU. After the Weimar Republic amnestied those who had taken part in the Hamburg Uprising, Kippenberger returned to Germany, where he became, according to John O. Koehler, "the most important link between the Soviet secret service and Germany's Communist Party, functioning at various times under the code names Alex, Adam, and Wolf".

Sources differ over whether he returned from the Soviet Union at the end of 1924 and then lived illegally (unregistered) in Germany or stayed in the Soviet Union until 1926 (or beyond). There is also a suggestion that in Moscow, as well attending a military academy, he studied at the Communist University of the National Minorities of the West. During 1924 and 1925, he had still been sought, apparently without success, by the Hamburg police in connection with the part that he had played in the Hamburg Uprising.

== Red Stormtroopers ==
Towards the end of the 1920s, Kippenberger was ordered by the Comintern to create a secret paramilitary wing for the Communist Party. In response, Kippenberger created the Parteiselbstschutz, or "Party Self Defense Unit".

According to Koehler, "World War I veterans taught the novices how to handle pistols, rifles, machine guns, and hand grenades. This clandestine training was conducted in the sparsely populated, pastoral countryside surrounding Berlin". Members of the Parteiselbstschutz "served as bouncers at Party meetings and specialized in cracking heads during street battles with political enemies". Besides the ruling Social Democratic Party and its paramilitary Reichsbanner units, the arch-enemies of the Parteiselbstschutz were the Stahlhelm, which was the armed wing of the monarchist German National People's Party (DVNP), Trotskyites, and "radical nationalist parties". The Communist Party's Parteiselbstschutz men "always carried a Stahlrute, two steel springs that telescoped into a tube seven inches long, which when extended became a deadly, fourteen-inch weapon. Not to be outdone by the Nazis, these street-fighters were often armed with pistols as well".

== Representative ==
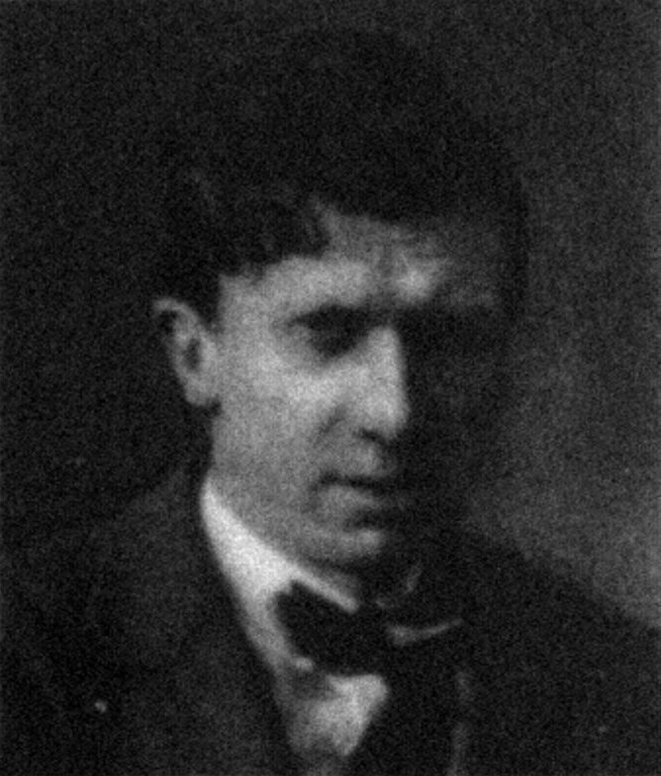
Kippenberger's official Reichstag portrait, 1928

In May 1928, he stood for membership of the Reichstag in the general election. He was successful, despite being arrested during the election campaign. As an elected member of the Reichstag he enjoyed certain immunities, and once the election result became known, he had to be released. He sat as a Communist Party member for Electoral District 29 (Leipzig).

At the twelfth party conference, held in 1929 in the central Wedding district of Berlin, Kippenberg was accepted as a candidate for the party's Central Committee membership. In the Reichstag, his focus was on defence matters, and he was a member of the parliamentary military commission. He continued to sit in the Reichstag till 1933. Outside the chamber, he built up the so-called Betriebsberichterstattung (BB-Ressort), which originated in 1927 within the party's illegal military apparatus but from 1932 was consciously separated from it. It was a quasi-military body comprising approximately 300 members, who undertook economic-espionage tasks on behalf of the Soviet Union and also reported more generally on social, political and economic developments during what was a period of rising tension inside Germany. Seen from the perspective of the Nazi Party, the BB-Ressort was "the German Communist Party's most dangerous structure".

== Bülowplatz Murders ==
=== Planning ===
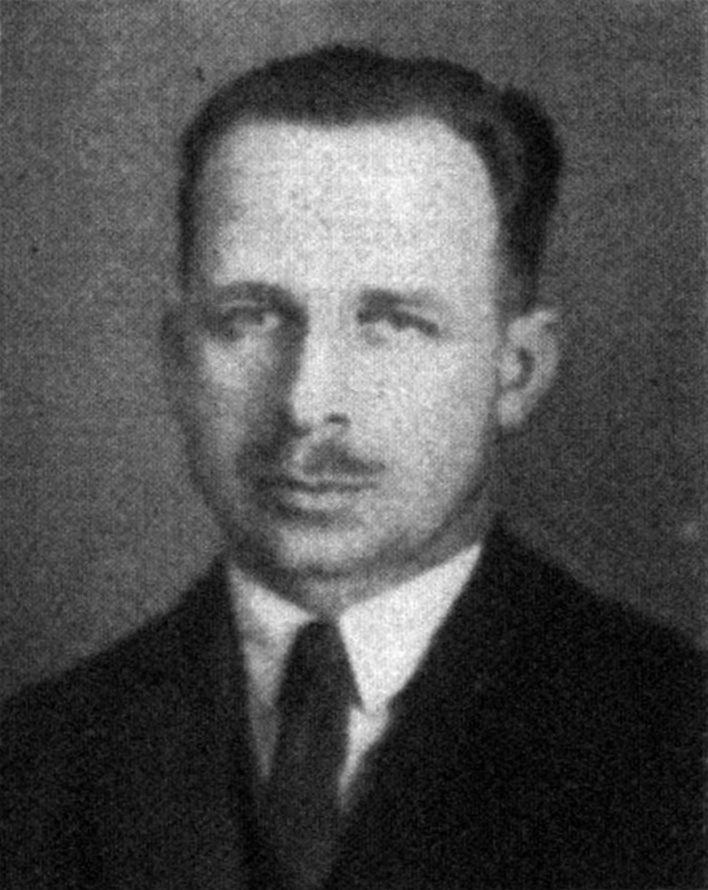
Walter Ulbricht, the mastermind of the Anlauf-Lenck murders, became General Secretary of the East German SED (1949–1971).

During the last days of the Weimar Republic, the KPD had a policy of assassinating two Berlin police officers in retaliation for every KPD member killed by the police. On 2 August 1931, KPD Members of the Reichstag Kippenberger and Heinz Neumann received a dressing down from Walter Ulbricht, the party's leader in the Berlin-Brandenburg region. Enraged by police interference and by Neumann and Kippenberger's failure to follow the policy, Ulbricht snarled, "At home in Saxony we would have done something about the police a long time ago. Here in Berlin we will not fool around much longer. Soon we will hit the police in the head".

Enraged by Ulbricht's words, Kippenberger and Neumann decided to assassinate Paul Anlauf, the 42-year-old captain of the Berlin Police's Seventh Precinct. Anlauf, a widower with three daughters, had been nicknamed Schweinebacke by the KPD (the insult literally means "pork cheek" but is closer to "fat bastard").

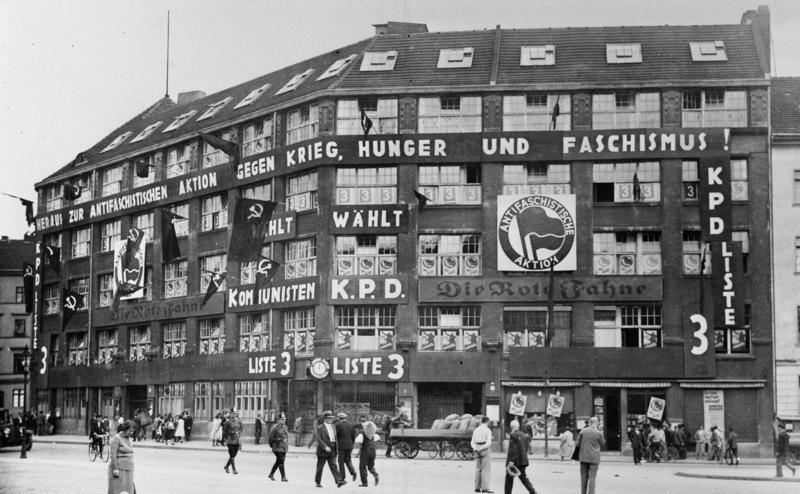
Karl-Liebknecht-Haus, Bülowplatz, was the KPD's headquarters from 1926 to 1933. Today, it is the Berlin headquarters of the Left Party.

According to Koehler, "Of all the policemen in strife-torn Berlin, the reds hated Anlauf the most. His precinct included the area around KPD headquarters, which made it the most dangerous in the city. The captain almost always led the riot squads that broke up illegal rallies of the Communist Party".

On the morning of Sunday 9 August 1931, Kippenberger and Neumann gave a last briefing to the hit team in a room at the Lassant beer hall. The Parteiselbstschutz members Erich Mielke and Erich Ziemer were selected as the shooters. During the meeting, Max Matern gave a Luger pistol to fellow lookout Max Thunert and said, "Now we're getting serious... We're going to give Schweinebacke something to remember us by".

Kippenberger then asked Mielke and Ziemer, "Are you sure that you are ready to shoot Schweinebacke?" Mielke responded that he had seen Captain Anlauf many times during police searches of Party Headquarters. Kippenberger then instructed them to wait at a nearby beer hall which would permit them to overlook the entire Bülow-Platz. He further reminded them that Captain Anlauf was accompanied everywhere by Senior Sergeant Max Willig, whom the KPD had nicknamed Hussar.

Kippenberger concluded, "When you spot Schweinebacke and Hussar, you take care of them". Mielke and Ziemer were informed that after the assassinations had been completed, a diversion would assist in their escape. They were then to return to their homes and await further instructions.

That evening, Anlauf was lured to Bülow-Platz by a violent rally demanding the dissolution of the Prussian Parliament.

According to Koehler, "As was often the case when it came to battling the dominant SPD, the KPD and the Nazis had combined forces during the pre-plebiscite campaign. At one point in this particular campaign, Nazi propaganda chief Joseph Goebbels even shared a speaker's platform with KPD agitator Walter Ulbricht. Both parties wanted the parliament dissolved because they were hoping that new elections would oust the SPD, the sworn enemy of all radicals. That fact explained why the atmosphere was particularly volatile this Sunday".

=== Murder at the Babylon Cinema ===
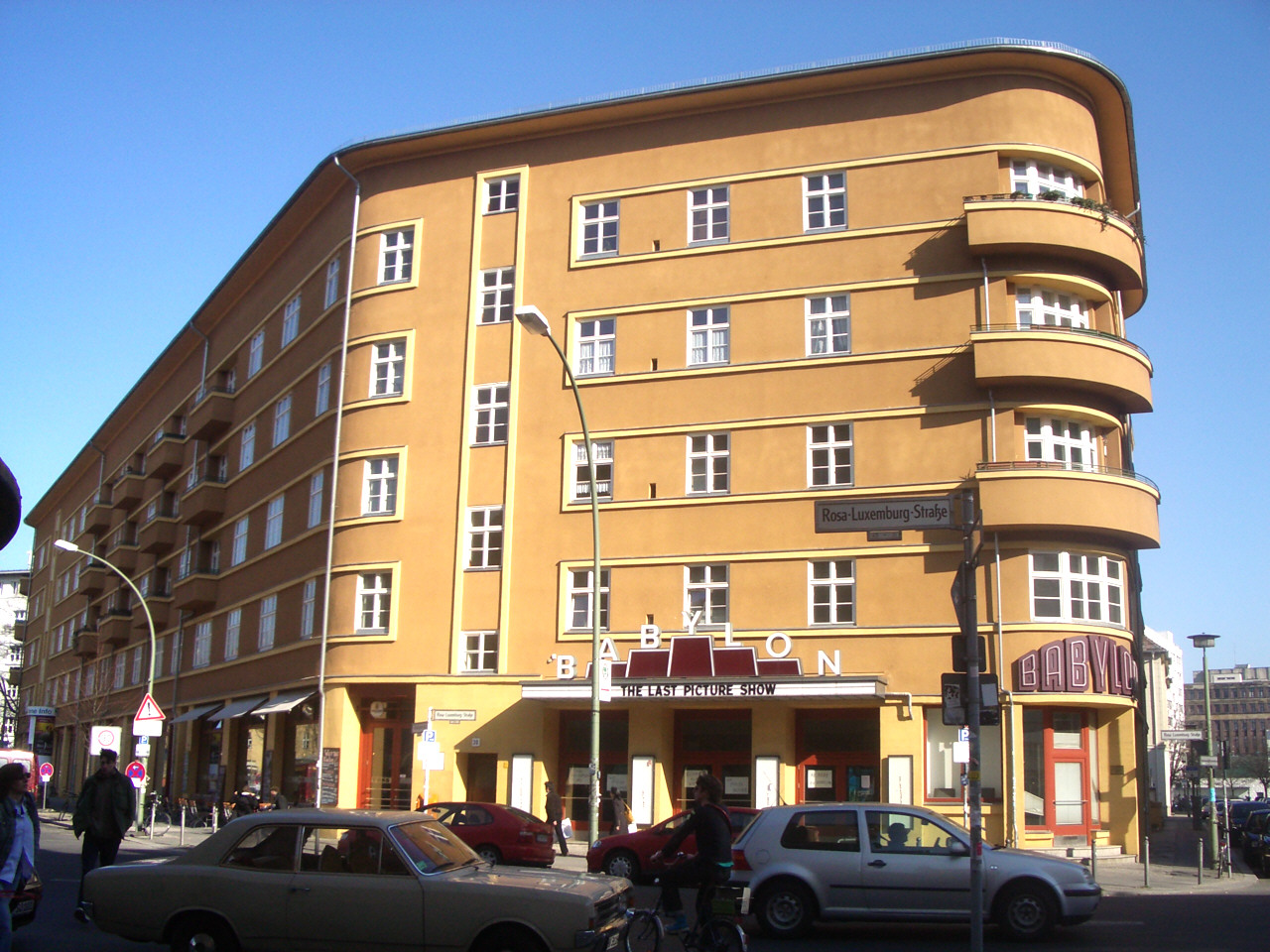
The "Babylon Cinema", the site of the assassinations of Anlauf and Lenck, as it appears today.

At eight o'clock that evening, Mielke and Ziemer waited in a doorway as Captain Anlauf, Sergeant Willig and Captain Franz Lenck walked toward the Babylon Cinema, which was located in Berlin at the corner of Bülowplatz and Kaiser-Wilhelm-Straße. As they reached the door of the movie house, the policemen heard someone scream, "Schweinebacke!"

As Anlauf turned toward the sound, Mielke and Ziemer opened fire at point blank range. Willig was wounded in the left arm and the stomach but managed to draw his Luger pistol and fired a full magazine at the assailants. Lenck was shot in the chest and fell dead in front of the entrance. Willig crawled over and cradled the head of Captain Anlauf, who had taken two bullets in the neck. As his life drained away, the Captain gasped, "Wiedersehen... Gruss..." ("So Long... Goodbye...").

Meanwhile, Mielke and Ziemer made their escape by running into the cinema and out an emergency exit. They tossed their pistols over a fence, where they were later found by homicide detectives from the elite Mordkommission (Homicide Squad). Mielke and Ziemer then returned to their homes.

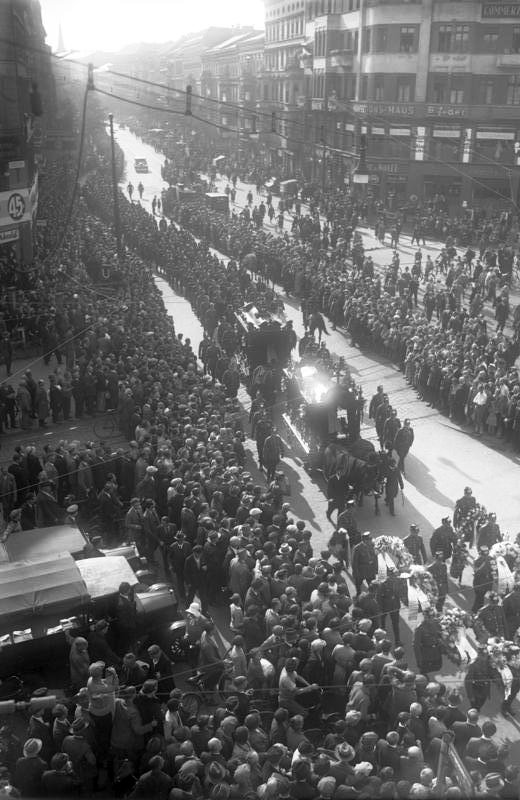
The funeral of Anlauf and Lenck was attended by thousands of Berliners.

According to Koehler, "Back at Bülowplatz, the killings had triggered a major police action. At least a thousand officers poured into the square, and a bloody street battle ensued. Rocks and bricks were hurled from the rooftops. Communist gunmen fired indiscriminately from the roofs of surrounding apartment houses. As darkness fell, police searchlights illuminated the buildings. Using megaphones, officers shouted, 'Clear the streets! Move away from the windows! We are returning fire!' By now the rabble had fled the square, but shooting continued as riot squads combed the tenements, arresting hundreds of residents suspected of having fired weapons. The battle lasted until one o'clock the next morning. In addition to the two police officers, the casualties included one Communist who died of a gunshot wound and seventeen others who were seriously wounded".

Anlauf's wife had died three weeks earlier of kidney failure. The KPD's murder of Captain Anlauf thus left their three daughters as orphans. His oldest daughter was forced to drastically rush her planned wedding to keep her sisters from being put in an orphanage. Lenck was survived by his wife. Willig was hospitalised for 14 weeks but made a full recovery and returned to active duty. In recognition for Willig's courage, the Berlin Police promoted him to lieutenant.

After the murders, the act was celebrated at the Lichtenberger Hof, a favorite beer hall of the Rotfrontkämpferbund, where Mielke boasted: "Today we celebrate a job that I pulled!" (German: "Heute wird ein Ding gefeiert, das ich gedreht habe!")

=== Aftermath ===
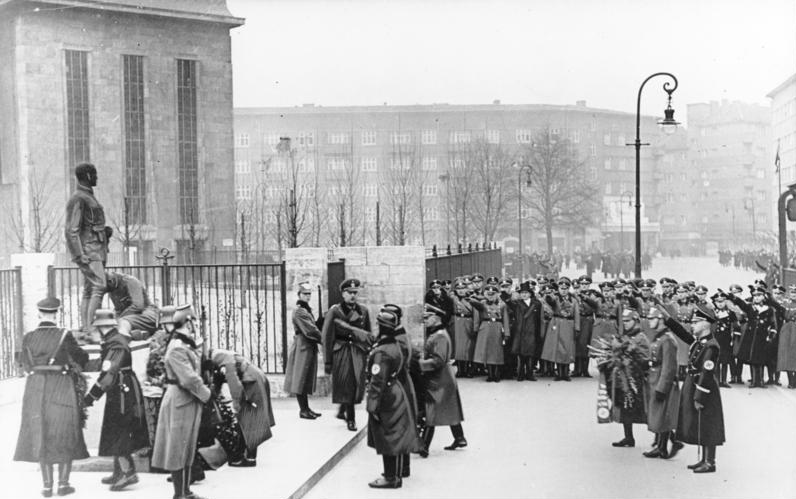
German policemen lay a wreath on the monument to Anlauf and Lenck during the Day of the German Police, 16 January 1937. Although Anlauf and Lenck had been members of the SPD, the Nazi salute is given by many of those present. In 1951, Erich Mielke ordered the demolition of the monument.

According to Koehler, "Kippenberger was alarmed when word reached him that Sergeant Willig had survived the shooting. Not knowing whether the sergeant could talk and identify the attackers, Kippenberger was taking no chances. He directed a runner to summon Mielke and Ziemer to his apartment at 74 Bellermannstrasse, only a few minutes walk from where the two lived. When the assassins arrived, Kippenberger told them the news and ordered them to leave Berlin at once. The parliamentarian's wife Thea, an unemployed schoolteacher and as staunch a Communist Party member as her husband, shepherded the young murderers to the Belgian border. Agents of the Communist International (Comintern) in the port city of Antwerp supplied them with money and forged passports. Aboard a merchant ship, they sailed for Leningrad. When their ship docked, they were met by another Comintern representative, who escorted them to Moscow".

== Nazi Germany ==
The political backdrop was transformed with the Nazi seizure of power, in January 1933. The new government lost little time in transforming Germany into a one-party dictatorship. Kippenberger was one of those who participated in the (illegal) meeting of the party central committee held at the Sporthaus Ziegenhals, near Berlin, on 7 February 1933. The meeting would subsequently be celebrated as both the first and last meeting of the Communist Party Central Committee held in Nazi Germany.

The Reichstag fire, on 27 February 1933, was immediately blamed on the Communist Party, and by the end of the year, participants in the Ziegenhals meeting and most of the other active party politicians had either fled abroad or been arrested. The Communist Party structure was shattered. Kippenberger took on and preserved much of its paramilitary apparatus under conditions of enhanced secrecy and certain important tasks were accomplished, but the Gestapo nevertheless succeeded in infiltrating his information and communications structures.

Kippenberger, operating for some purposes under the code name "Leo", was feverishly sought by the Gestapo in 1933 and 1934. Meanwhile, despite having to operate underground or increasingly out of Paris, the party had lost none of its appetite for internal feuding. The arrest of Ernst Thälmann on 3 March 1933 had left a vacuum at the top of the party. To the extent that the quasi-military apparatus under Kippenberger remained effective, it supported the opponents of Walter Ulbricht and Wilhelm Pieck in the increasingly-polarised leadership struggle that ensued.

== Bülowplatz Trial ==
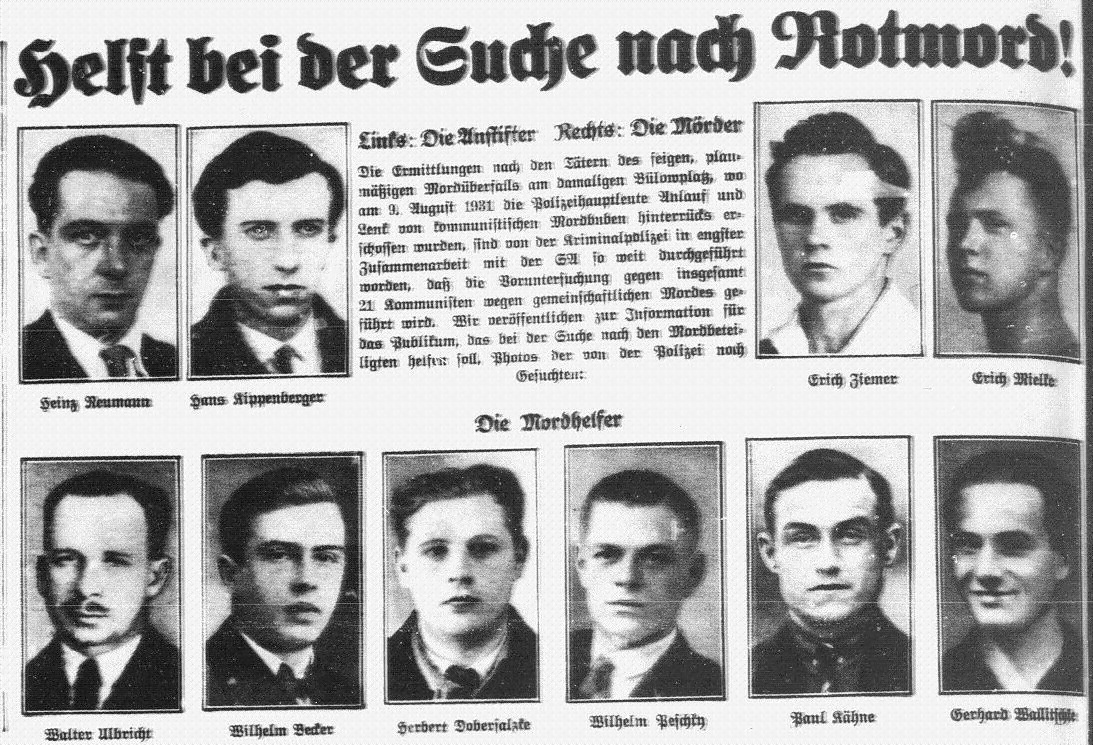
"Help in the search for the Red Murderers!" A wanted poster published the Berlin Police following the murders, September 1933. Kippenberger is on the top row, second from left.

In mid-March 1933, the Berlin police arrested Max Thunert, one of the lookouts in the murders of Anlauf and Lenck. Within days, 15 other conspirators were in police custody. On 14 September 1933, Berlin newspapers reported that all 15 had confessed to their roles in the murders. Arrest warrants were issued for ten other conspirators who had fled, including Mielke, Ziemer, Ulbricht, Kippenberger and Neumann.

In response to claims that the confessions had been obtained under torture by the Nazi Gestapo, Koehler wrote, "However, all suspects were in the custody of the regular Berlin city criminal investigation bureau, most of whose detectives were SPD members. Some of the suspects had been nabbed by Nazi SA men and probably beaten before they were turned over to police. In the 1993 trial of Mielke, the court gave the defense the benefit of the doubt and threw out a number of suspect confessions".

On 19 June 1934, the 15 conspirators were convicted of murder. The three deemed most culpable, Michael Klause, Max Matern and Friedrich Bröde, were sentenced to death. Their co-defendants received sentences ranging from nine months to fifteen years incarceration at hard labour. Klause's sentence was commuted to life in prison based upon his cooperation. Bröde hanged himself in his cell. As a result, only Matern was left to be executed by beheading on 22 May 1935.

== Fall from grace ==
In the context of increasingly-shrill attacks against him from Ulbricht, Pieck and their supporters, on 12 February 1935 the Party Politburo set up a commission of enquiry into Kippenberger. In October 1935, a party congress was held in which Ulbricht and his allies took over the party leadership. The resignation of two of Thälmann's old lieutenants, Hermann Schubert and Fritz Schulte, left Kippenberger unambiguously on the losing side. In Ulbricht, Kippenberger had acquired a powerful and uncompromising enemy at the top of the party who enjoyed the backing of the Soviet Communist Party. Kippenberger lost his position on the Central Committee, and the quasi-military underground operation that he had directed was dissolved. He was ordered to be relocated from Paris to Moscow, where he was provided with factory work. Sources are silent over whether, on moving to Moscow, he ever met up with his former wife, Thea, and their two daughters, Margot and Jeanette, who had emigrated there in July 1933, when Thea had been working as a teacher in the Soviet capital.

== Death ==
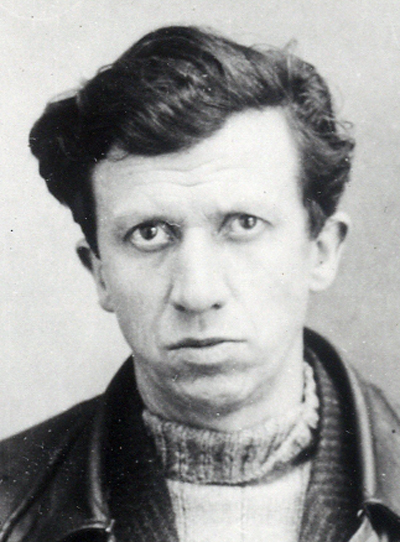
Kippenberger's NKVD mugshot, 4 November 1936

On 5 November 1935, as the scope of Joseph Stalin's Great Purge accelerated, Kippenberger and his girlfriend, Christina Kerff (born Christina Lenderoth), were arrested at Moscow's Soyuznaya Hotel (across the road from the Hotel Lux).

In a secret trial by the NKVD, Kippenberger was declared guilty of "espionage and participation in a counter-revolutionary terrorist organisation". He was shot, once, in the back of the head, on 3 October 1937.

== Personal life ==
Kippenberger married Thea Niemand (1901–1939), from Hamburg, in 1923. They had two daughters, Margot (1924–2005) and Jeanette (1928–2016). The marriage ended in divorce in 1930. After a raid on their Berlin apartment, Thea hastily took the children to a safe location in the countryside from where they escaped via Czechoslovakia. Thea arrived in Moscow with their daughters in July 1933, six months after the Nazi seizure of power in Germany. The standard of their Moscow accommodation, shared with Thea Kippenberger's friend Thea Beling and a large number of other people, came as a shock to the children. In February 1938, Thea, who now worked as a teacher, was arrested. A special NKVD tribunal sentenced her to a lengthy term in the Gulag. In 1939, she died in a concentration camp in Siberia.

== Rehabilitation ==
Two decades later, after a change in the political wind direction, Hans and Thea Kippenberger were posthumously rehabilitated by a Moscow tribunal on 30 September 1957. However, both their deaths and their subsequent rehabilitations remained officially undisclosed by the ruling party in what had become the Soviet-sponsored German Democratic Republic (East Germany).

== Orphans ==
One afternoon in November 1937, two secret policemen turned up at their school in Moscow and removed Margot and Jeanette Kippenberger from their lessons. Early the next year, aged 14, Margot wrote a desperate letter to one of her mother's friends and asked what had happened to her mother. There was no reply. It would be another 22 years before she would learn of her parents' fates. The children were taken to Chistopol, in Tatarstan, and placed in an orphanage for "homeless street children", which was then receiving more and more of the children of "enemies of the people".

The older daughter, Margot Kippenberger, was transferred to a labour camp in Vologodskaya and was condemned in 1942 to a lifelong term of forced labour. She was given work in forestry and tasked with collecting the sawdust caused by the felling of trees. There was one day off work each month which was used for delousing. Later, she was denounced and subjected to six months of intensive interrogation. Nevertheless, she survived. Her situation eased after the end of the Second World War, formally in May 1945, and she married Igor Tschnernavin, a Soviet citizen in 1948.

After her parents' rehabilitation, Margot was able to leave the Soviet Union with her five children and arrived in the German Democratic Republic in May 1958. Their marriage never having been officially recognised because Margot was foreign, Igor was not permitted to accompany them, but after a personal appeal to Nikita Khrushchev, he joined them in 1960. The family nevertheless felt treated as outsiders, and while Margot built her life in the new country, Igor soon returned to the Soviet Union, where he died in 1984. Although Margot had been informed of her parents' fates, she was under firm instructions to keep the information to herself. Her insistence on discussing the matter led to constant tensions with the authorities. Her indignant letter sent in 1979 to the national newspaper, Neues Deutschland, on the centenary of Stalin's birth, was naturally never published. She remained under close Stasi surveillance until March 1981, when she was permitted to relocate to West Berlin, where she lived in a small apartment, supported by a small pension provided to survivors of Nazi persecution. There was no pension in respect of her time in the Soviet Union.

There is less information in the public domain concerning the younger daughter. After the daughters had been taken away from their parents at the end of 1937, Jeanette had learned Russian much more quickly than Margot, which may have indicated a particular talent for languages. Jeanette Kippenberger worked for the government news service in East Berlin between 1956 and 1973 as a typist. specialising in Russian language work. She was given a new job, in September 1973, as a translator with the Intertext, the ruling party's translation bureau. She moved to West Germany on 14 July 1978.

Margot and Jeannette Kippenberger died respectively in 2005 and 2016. Both of their bodies are buried in the Sankt-Matthäus-Kirchhof ("Old St. Matthew's Churchyard") in Berlin's Schöneberg quarter. It was noted at the end of 2017, that their graves were not yet marked by any grave stone.

== Works ==
- Together with Adolf Franck: Monistische Jugendbewegung „Sonne“ (Monistic Youth Movement "Sun"). Verlag Paul Hartung, Hamburg 1922
- A. Neuberg: Der bewaffnete Aufstand. Versuch einer theoretischen Darstellung (Armed Insurrection. An Attempt at a Theoretical Presentation). Allegedly published by "Otto Meyer, Zürich" 1928. Reprinted with an introduction by Erich Wollenberg, EVA, Frankfurt am Main 1971. Authors: O. Piatnitzki, Michael N. Tuchatschewski, Hồ Chí Minh and others. A. Neuberg is a pseudonym. Chapter 4, "Der Aufstand in Hamburg" (The Hamburg Uprising), pp. 66–94, is by Kippenberger.
