= Bernhard Weiß =

Bernhard Weiß may refer to:

- Bernhard Weiß (police executive) (1880–1951), German lawyer and Vice President of the Berlin police during the Weimar Republic
- Bernhard Weiss (1827–1918), New Testament scholar
- Bernhard Weiß (musician), vocalist with Axxis
