= Max Matern =

German communist and murder accomplice

- Born: January 19, 1902; Berndshof, German Empire
- Died: May 22, 1935 (aged 33); Plötzensee Prison, Berlin, Nazi Germany
- Cause of death: Execution by guillotine
- Known for: Assassination of Paul Anlauf and Franz Lenck
- Political party: Communist Party of Germany (KPD)

Max Matern (19 January 1902 – 22 May 1935) was a member of the Communist Party of Germany (KPD) who was convicted of murder and executed for his role in the assassinations of Police Captains Paul Anlauf and Franz Lenck. The murders took place in 1931 at Bülow-Platz in Berlin. Matern was later glorified as a martyr by the KPD and East Germany's Socialist Unity Party of Germany (SED).

== Early life ==
Max Matern was born in Berndshof near Ueckermünde and grew up in meager circumstances in Quitzdorf am See in eastern Saxony. He did an apprenticeship as a moulder in Torgelow and in 1925 moved to Berlin owing to the lack of jobs closer to home. There he found work as a member of the KPD's Parteiselbstschutz (Party Self Defense Unit) in which he demonstrated hard-line conviction and loyalty to the party.

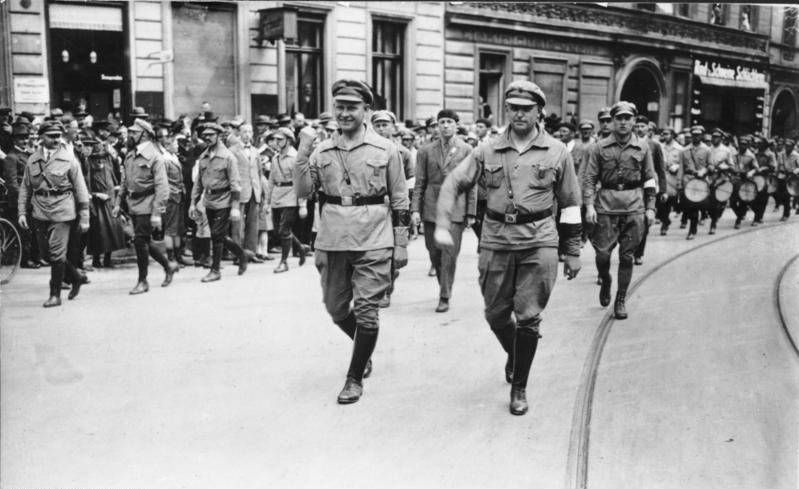
Communist leaders Ernst Thälmann (left) and Willy Leow (right) in front of parading troops of Rotfrontkämpferbund during their national meeting in Berlin, June 1927.

According to John Koehler,

Like their Nazi counterparts, the Selbstschutz men were thugs who served as bouncers at Party meetings and specialized in cracking heads during street battles with political enemies. Besides the Nazis, their arch foes included the Sozialdemokratische Partei Deutschlands (SPD) -- the Social Democratic Party of Germany -- and radical nationalist parties. They always carried a Stahlrute, two steel springs that telescoped into a tube seven inches long, which when extended became a deadly, fourteen inch weapon. Not to be outdone by the Nazis, these goons often were armed with pistols as well.

== The murders ==
During the last days of the Weimar Republic, the KPD in Berlin had a policy of assassinating a Berlin police officer in retaliation for every KPD member killed by the police. On August 2, 1931, KPD Members of the Reichstag Heinz Neumann and Hans Kippenberger received a dressing down from Walter Ulbricht, the Party's leader in the Berlin-Brandenburg region. Enraged by police interference and by Neumann and Kippenberger's failure to follow the policy, Ulbricht snarled, "At home in Saxony we would have done something about the police a long time ago. Here in Berlin we will not fool around much longer. Soon we will hit the police in the head."

Enraged by Ulrbicht's words, Kippenberger and Neumann decided to assassinate Captain Paul Anlauf, the forty-two-year-old commander of the Seventh Precinct. Captain Anlauf, a widower with three daughters, had been nicknamed Schweinebacke, or "Pig Face" by the KPD. According to John Koehler,

Of all the policemen in strife-torn Berlin, the reds hated Anlauf the most. His precinct included the area around KPD headquarters, which made it the most dangerous in the city. The captain almost always led the riot squads that broke up illegal rallies of the Communist Party.

On the morning of Sunday August 9, 1931, Kippenberger and Neumann gave a last briefing to the hit-team in a room at the Lassant beer hall. Erich Mielke and Erich Ziemer were selected as the shooters. During the meeting, Matern gave a Luger pistol to a fellow lookout and said, "Now we're getting serious... We're going to give Schweinebacke something to remember us by."

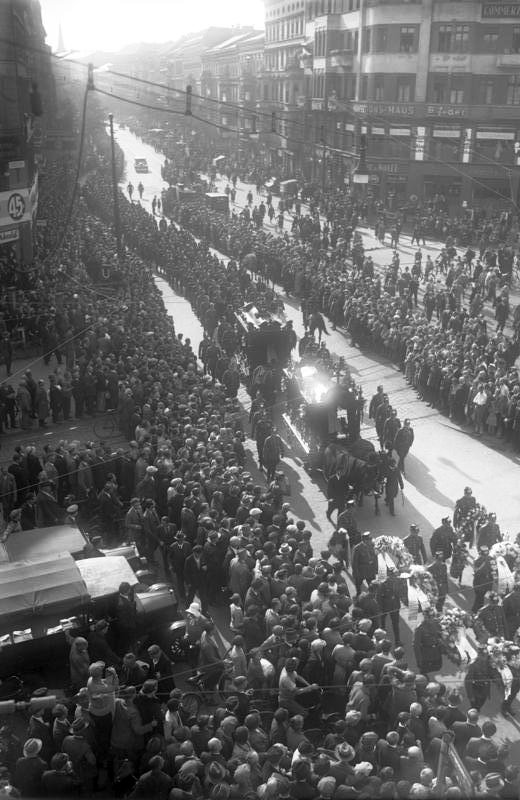
The funeral of Paul Anlauf and Franz Lenck was attended by thousands of Berliners

Kippenberger then asked Mielke and Ziemer, "Are you sure that you are ready to shoot Schweinebacke?" Mielke responded that he had seen Captain Anlauf many times during police searches of Party Headquarters. Kippenberger then instructed them to wait at a nearby beer hall which would permit them to overlook the entire Bülow-Platz. He further reminded them that Captain Anlauf was accompanied everywhere by Senior Sergeant Max Willig, whom the KPD had nicknamed, "Hussar."

Kippenberger concluded, "When you spot Schweinebacke and Hussar, you take care of them." After the assassinations were completed, Mielke and Ziemer were informed that a diversion would assist in their escape. They were then to return to their homes and await further instructions.

That evening, Captain Anlauf was lured to Bülow-Platz by a violent rally demanding the dissolution of the Prussian Parliament. According to John Koehler,

As was often the case when it came to battling the dominant SPD, the KPD and the Nazis had combined forces during the pre-plebiscite campaign. At one point in this particular campaign, Nazi propaganda chief Joseph Goebbels even shared a speaker's platform with KPD agitator Walter Ulbricht. Both parties wanted the parliament dissolved because they were hoping that new elections would oust the SPD, the sworn enemy of all radicals. That fact explained why the atmosphere was particularly volatile this Sunday.

At eight o'clock that evening, Mielke and Ziemer, spotted Captain Anlauf, Sergeant Willig, and Captain Franz Lenck walking in front of the Babylon Cinema, which was located at the corner of Bülowplatz and Kaiser-Wilhelm-Straße. As they reached the door of the movie house, the policemen heard someone scream, "Schweinebacke!"

As Captain Anlauf turned towards the sound, Mielke and Ziemer opened fire at point blank range. Sergeant Willig was wounded in the left arm and the stomach. However, he managed to draw his Luger and fired a full clip at the assailants. Captain Franz Lenck was shot in the chest and fell dead in front of the entrance. Willig crawled over to Captain Anlauf, who had taken two bullets in the neck. As his life drained away, the Captain gasped, "Wiedersehen... Gruss..." ("So Long... Goodbye...") Meanwhile, Matern, Mielke, Thunert, and Ziemer made their escape.

After it was revealed that Sergeant Willig had survived and could identify the assailants, Mielke and Ziemer were smuggled to the Soviet Union.

== Arrest, trial, and execution ==
In March 1933, lookout Max Thunert was arrested by the Berlin police, he confessed to his involvement in the murders and revealed all he knew. Within days, fifteen suspects, including Matern, were rounded up and imprisoned. On 14 September 1933, Berlin's newspapers announced that all of them had confessed to their roles in the assassinations. Together with two co-defendants, Michael Klause and Friedrich Broede, Max Matern was convicted of murder on 19 June 1934 and sentenced to death. He was guillotined on 22 May 1935.

== Aftermath ==
In East German historical literature, Matern was made into a martyr for the communist cause. Many streets, schools, and establishments were named after him. His life became the stylized career of an exemplary communist, as seen in the propagandistic version of his biography.

Decades later, on 26 October 1993, Erich Mielke (1907–2000), former East German Minister of State Security, was convicted of murdering Captains Anlauf and Lenck in addition to the attempted murder of Sergeant Max Willig. He was sentenced to six years in prison. However, owing to health reasons, he did not serve the full sentence.
