= Murder of Paul Anlauf and Franz Lenck =

1932 Communist murders of German police

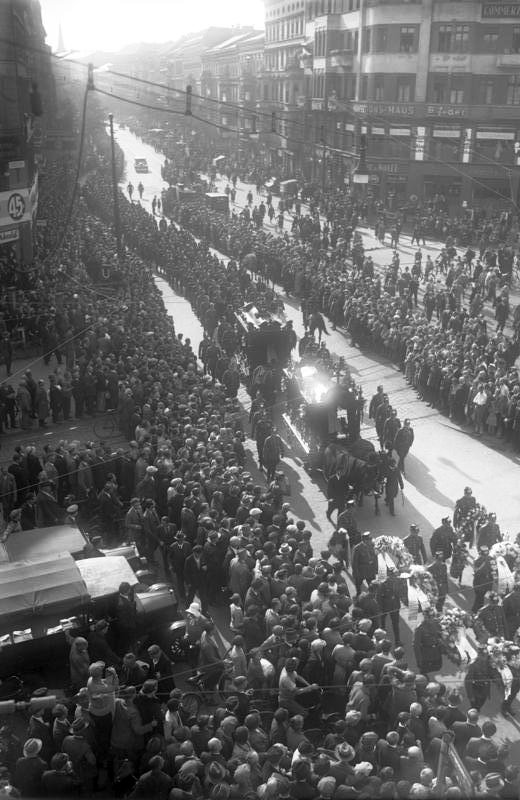
The funeral of Paul Anlauf and Franz Lenck was attended by thousands of Berliners.

On 9 August 1931 a double homicide took place in Berlin, Weimar Germany, when Berlin police captains Paul Anlauf and Franz Lenck were assassinated by two members of the Parteiselbstschutz, the paramilitary wing of the Communist Party of Germany (KPD), on the orders of Walter Ulbricht, the regional KPD leader (and future premier of East Germany). The two murderers were Erich Mielke and Erich Ziemer. Mielke later became the head of the Stasi, the secret police of East Germany; he was not tried and convicted of the murders until 1993.

== Planning and execution ==
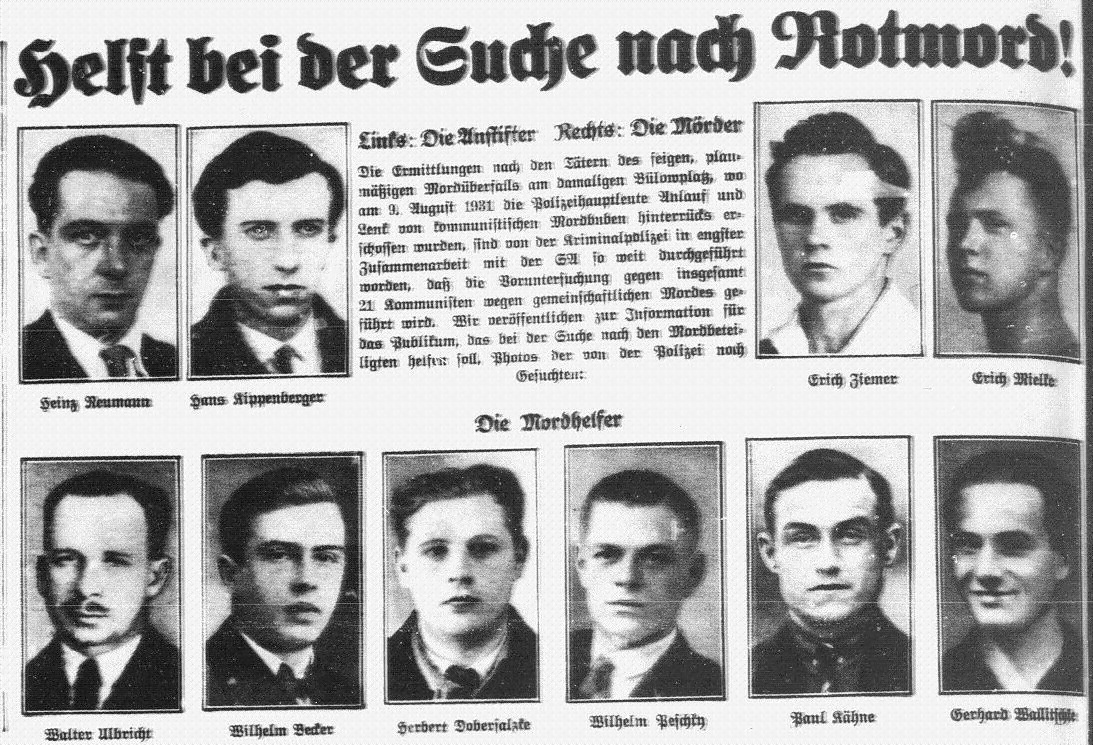
"Help in the search for the Red Murderers!" A 'wanted' poster published by the Berlin Police in September 1933, following the murders. Erich Mielke is on the far right in the top row. Ziemer is to the left of Mielke. Walter Ulbricht is on the far left in the bottom row.

During the last days of the Weimar Republic, Berlin's contingent of the Communist Party of Germany (KPD) had a policy of assassinating a Berlin police officer in retaliation for every KPD member assassinated by the police. On 2 August 1931, KPD Reichstag members Heinz Neumann and Hans Kippenberger received a dressing-down from Walter Ulbricht, the KPD's leader in the Berlin-Brandenburg region. Enraged by police interference and by Neumann and Kippenberger's failure to follow the policy, Ulbricht snarled, "At home in Saxony we would have done something about the police a long time ago. Here in Berlin we will not fool around much longer. Soon we will hit the police in the head."

As a result of Ulbricht's words, Kippenberger and Neumann decided to assassinate Captain Paul Anlauf, the forty-two-year-old commander of the Berlin Police's Seventh Precinct. Captain Anlauf, a widower with three daughters, had been nicknamed Schweinebacke, or "Pig Cheek" by the KPD. According to John Koehler:

Of all the policemen in strife-torn Berlin, the reds hated Anlauf the most. His precinct included the area around KPD headquarters, which made it the most dangerous in the city. The captain almost always led the riot squads that broke up illegal rallies of the Communist Party.

On the morning of Sunday, 9 August 1931, Kippenberger and Neumann gave a final briefing to the hit team in a room at the Lassant beer hall. Two young members of the Parteiselbstschutz (part of the Antimilitärischer Apparat, the intelligence arm of the KPD), Erich Mielke and Erich Ziemer, were selected as the shooters. During the meeting, Max Matern gave a Luger pistol to a fellow lookout and said, "Now we're getting serious... We're going to give Schweinebacke something to remember us by." Kippenberger then asked Mielke and Ziemer, "Are you sure that you are ready to shoot Schweinebacke?" Mielke responded that he had seen Captain Anlauf many times during police searches of Party Headquarters. Kippenberger then instructed them to wait at a nearby beer hall which would permit them to overlook the entire Bülowplatz. He further reminded them that Anlauf was accompanied everywhere by Senior Sergeant Max Willig, whom the KPD had nicknamed "Hussar". Kippenberger concluded, "When you spot Schweinebacke and Hussar, you take care of them." Mielke and Ziemer were informed that, after the assassinations were completed, a diversion would assist in their escape. They were then to return to their homes and await further instructions.

That evening, Captain Anlauf was lured to Bülowplatz by a violent rally demanding the dissolution of the Prussian parliament. According to Koehler:

As was often the case when it came to battling the dominant SPD, the KPD and the Nazis had combined forces during the pre-plebiscite campaign. At one point in this particular campaign, Nazi propaganda chief Joseph Goebbels even shared a speaker's platform with KPD agitator Walter Ulbricht. Both parties wanted the parliament dissolved because they were hoping that new elections would oust the SPD, the sworn enemy of all radicals. That fact explained why the atmosphere was particularly volatile this Sunday.

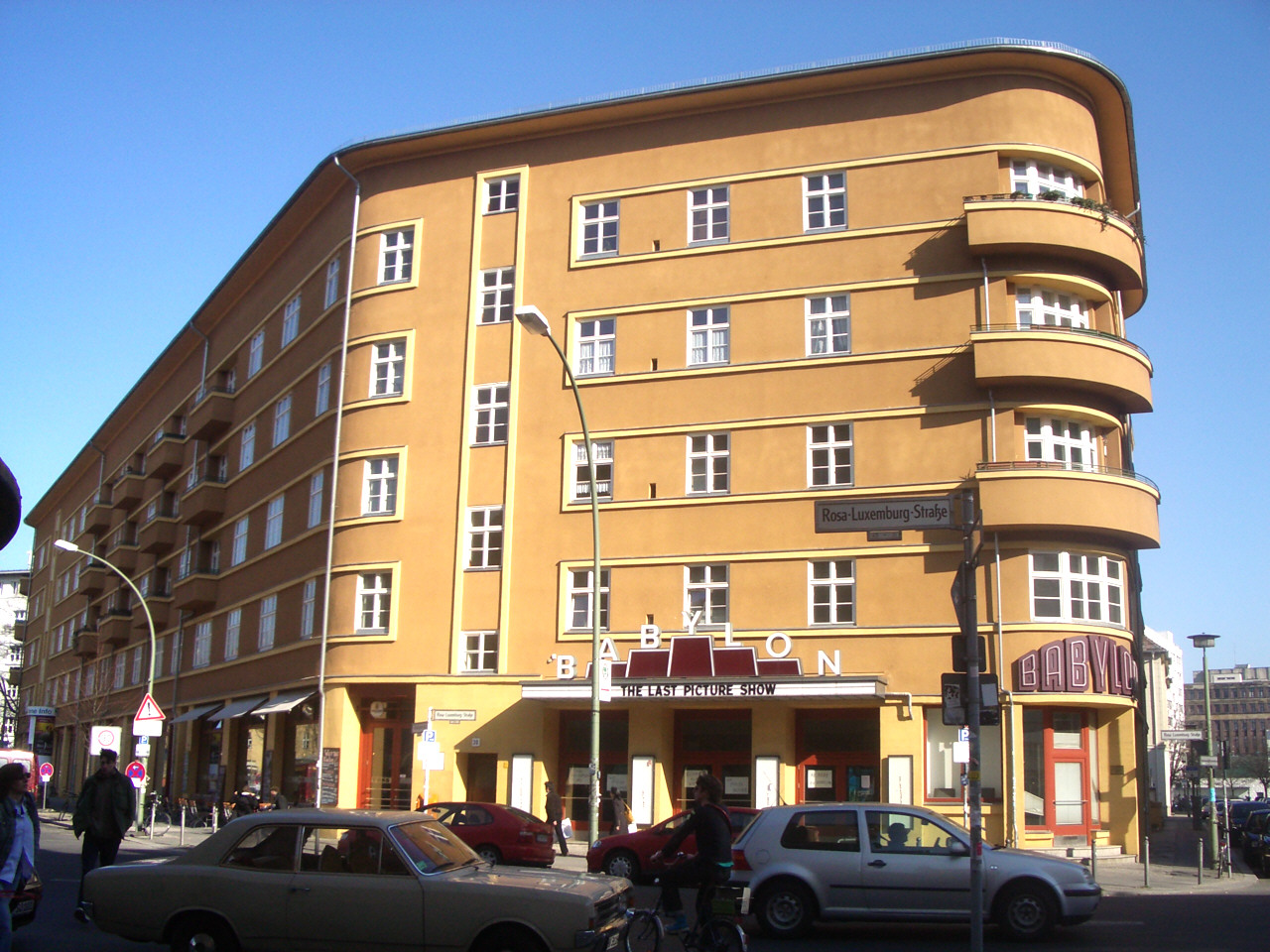
The "Babylon Cinema", the site of the assassinations of Anlauf and Lenck, as it appears today

At eight o'clock that evening, Mielke and Ziemer spotted Captain Anlauf, Sergeant Willig, and Captain Franz Lenck walking in front of the Babylon Cinema, which was located at the corner of Bülowplatz and Kaiser-Wilhelm-Straße. As they reached the door of the movie house, the policemen heard someone scream "Schweinebacke!"

As Captain Anlauf turned towards the sound, Mielke and Ziemer opened fire at point blank range. Sergeant Willig was wounded in the left arm and the stomach. However, he managed to draw his Luger and fired a full magazine at the assailants. Captain Franz Lenck was shot in the chest and fell dead in front of the entrance. Willig crawled over to Captain Anlauf, who had taken two bullets in the neck. Before he died, the Captain gasped, "Wiedersehen... Gruss..." ("So Long... Goodbye...").

Meanwhile, Mielke and Ziemer made their escape by running into the movie theater and out an emergency exit. They tossed their pistols over a fence, where they were later found by detectives from Ernst Gennat's elite Mordkommission. Mielke and Ziemer then returned to their homes.

== Aftermath ==
According to John Koehler:

Kippenberger was alarmed when word reached him that Sergeant Willig had survived the shooting. Not knowing whether the sergeant could talk and identify the attackers, Kippenberger was taking no chances. He directed a runner to summon Mielke and Ziemer to his apartment at 74 Bellermannstrasse, only a few minutes walk from where the two lived. When the assassins arrived, Kippenberger told them the news and ordered them to leave Berlin at once. The parliamentarian's wife Thea, an unemployed schoolteacher and as staunch a Communist Party member as her husband, shepherded the young murderers to the Belgian border. Agents of the Communist International (Comintern) in the port city of Antwerp supplied them with money and forged passports. Aboard a merchant ship, they sailed for Leningrad. When their ship docked, they were met by another Comintern representative, who escorted them to Moscow.

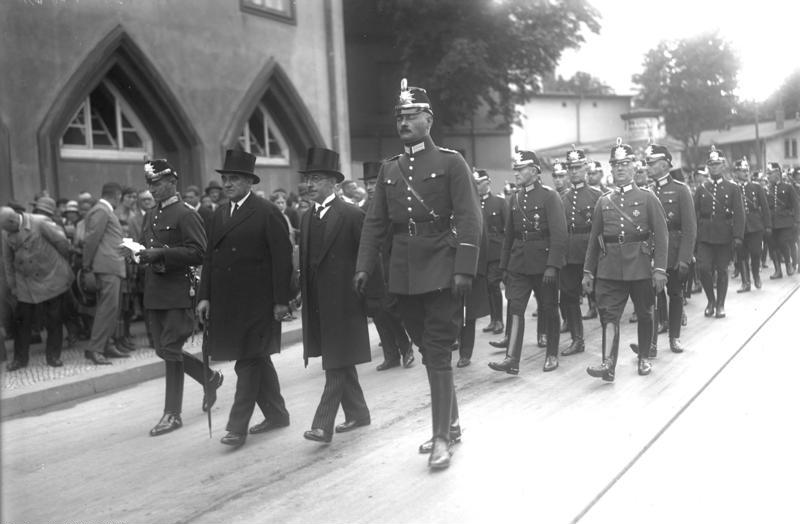
The funeral of the murdered police officers. In front Magnus Heimannsberg, Albert Grzesinski and Bernhard Weiß

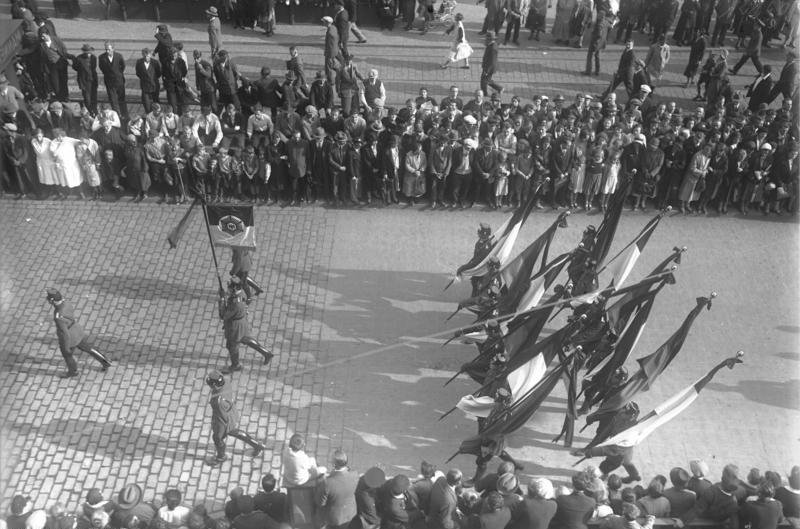
The flag company with the standard of the Schutzpolizei at the funeral of the murdered police officers

Thousands of Berliners attended the funeral of the two police officers. Captain Anlauf's wife had died three weeks earlier of kidney failure. The KPD's murder of Anlauf thus left their three daughters as orphans. In the aftermath, Captain Anlauf's oldest daughter was forced to drastically rush her planned wedding in order to keep her sisters out of an orphanage. Captain Franz Lenck was survived by his wife. Senior Sergeant Max Willig was hospitalized for 14 weeks, but made a full recovery and returned to active duty. In recognition for Willig's courage, the Berlin Police promoted him to Lieutenant.

After the murders, the act was celebrated at the Lichtenberger Hof, a favorite beer hall of the Roter Frontkämpferbund, where Mielke boasted: "Today we celebrate a job that I pulled!" (German: "Heute wird ein Ding gefeiert, das ich gedreht habe!")

According to Koehler:

In mid-March 1933, while attending the Lenin School, Mielke received word from his OGPU sponsors that Berlin police had arrested Max Thunert, one of the conspirators in the Anlauf and Lenck murders. Within days, fifteen other members of the assassination team were in custody. Mielke had to wait six more months before the details of the police action against his Berlin comrades reached Moscow. On 14 September 1933, Berlin newspapers reported that all fifteen had confessed to their roles in the murders. Arrest warrants were issued for ten others who had fled, including Mielke, Ziemer, Ulbricht, Kippenberger, and Neumann.

Koehler also stated:

Defenders of Mielke later claimed that confessions had been obtained under torture by the Nazi Gestapo. However, all suspects were in the custody of the regular Berlin city criminal investigation bureau, most of whose detectives were SPD members. Some of the suspects had been nabbed by Nazi SA men and probably beaten before they were turned over to police. In the 1993 trial of Mielke, the court gave the defense the benefit of the doubt and threw out a number of suspect confessions.

On 19 June 1934, the 15 conspirators were convicted of murder. The three deemed most culpable, Michael Klause, Max Matern, and Friedrich Bröde, were sentenced to death. Their co-defendants received sentences ranging from nine months to fifteen years incarceration at hard labor. Klause's sentence was commuted to life in prison based upon his cooperation. Bröde hanged himself in his cell on 19 March 1935. As a result, only Matern was left to be guillotined on 22 May 1935. Matern was subsequently glorified as a martyr by KPD and East German propaganda. Erich Ziemer was officially killed in action while serving as an agent in the Servicio de Información Militar, the secret police of the Second Spanish Republic. Neumann and Kippenberger ultimately fled to the Soviet Union after their involvement in the killings was revealed. Both were arrested, tortured, and executed by the NKVD during Joseph Stalin's Great Purge.

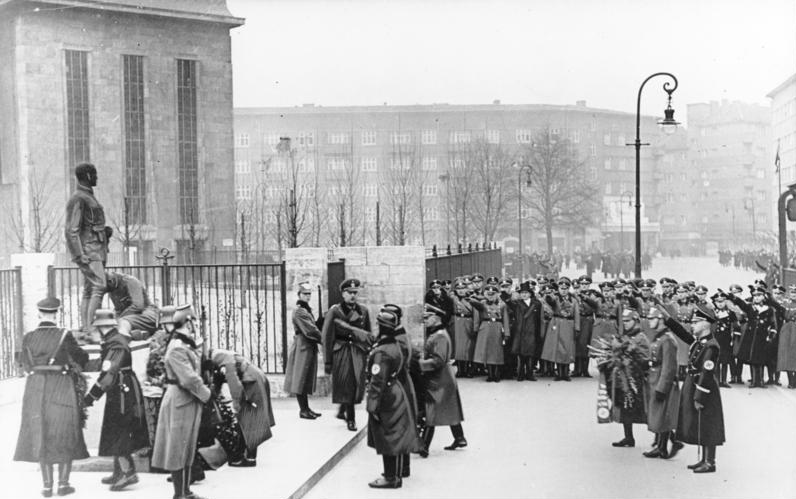
German policemen lay a wreath on the monument to Captains Anlauf and Lenck during the Day of the German Police, 16 January 1937. Despite the fact that Captains Anlauf and Lenck were members of the SPD, the Nazi salute is given by many of those present. In 1951, Mielke ordered the demolition of the monument.

A monument, created by Hans Dammann, was erected to commemorate Anlauf and Lenck at the former Bülowplatz, then renamed Horst-Wessel-Platz, in 1934, and was opened with a ceremony on 29 September that year.

== Ghosts of Bülowplatz ==
The last survivor of the hit squad, Mielke, went on to lead the East German secret police, or Stasi, between 1957 and 1989.

In February 1992, Mielke was put on trial for the murders of Captains Anlauf and Lenck as well as the attempted murder of Senior Sergeant Willig. The evidence for Mielke's guilt was drawn from the original police files, the 1934 trial transcripts, and a handwritten memoir in which Mielke had admitted that "the Bülowplatz Affair" had been his reason for fleeing Germany. All had been found in Mielke's house safe during a police search in 1990. Mielke was believed to have kept the files for purposes of "blackmailing Honecker and other East German leaders." Former Associated Press reporter and White House Press Secretary John Koehler also testified about how Mielke had boasted of his involvement in the Bülowplatz murders during a confrontation at Leipzig in 1965.

During his trial, Mielke appeared increasingly senile, admitting his identity but otherwise remaining silent, taking naps, and did not show much interest in the proceedings. In a widely publicized incident, Mielke appeared to mistake the presiding judge for a prison barber. When a journalist for Der Spiegel attempted to interview him in Plötzensee Prison, Mielke responded "I want to go back to my bed" (German: "Ich möchte in mein Bett zurück"). Opinion was divided whether Mielke was suffering from senile dementia or was pretending in order to evade prosecution.

After twenty months of one-and-a-half-hour daily sessions, Erich Mielke was convicted of two counts of murder and one of attempted murder. On 26 October 1993, a panel of three judges and two jurors sentenced him to six years' imprisonment. In pronouncing sentence, Judge Theodor Seidel, told Mielke that he "will go down in history as one of the most fearsome dictators and police ministers of the 20th century."

After being paroled due to his advanced age and poor mental health, Mielke died on 21 May 2000, aged 92, in a Berlin nursing home. On 8 June 2000, flowers and wreaths left on his grave were found ripped apart and the grave defaced. The perpetrators of this vandalism were never caught.

== Resources ==
- Koehler, John O. (1999). Stasi: The Inside Story of the East German Secret Police. West View Press. ISBN 0-8133-3409-8.
- Kießling, Wolfgang (1998). Leistner ist Mielke. Schatten einer gefälschten Biographie (in German). Berlin: Aufbau Taschenbuch Verlag. ISBN 3-7466-8036-0.
