= Bernhard Weiß (police executive) =

German lawyer and police chief (1880–1951)

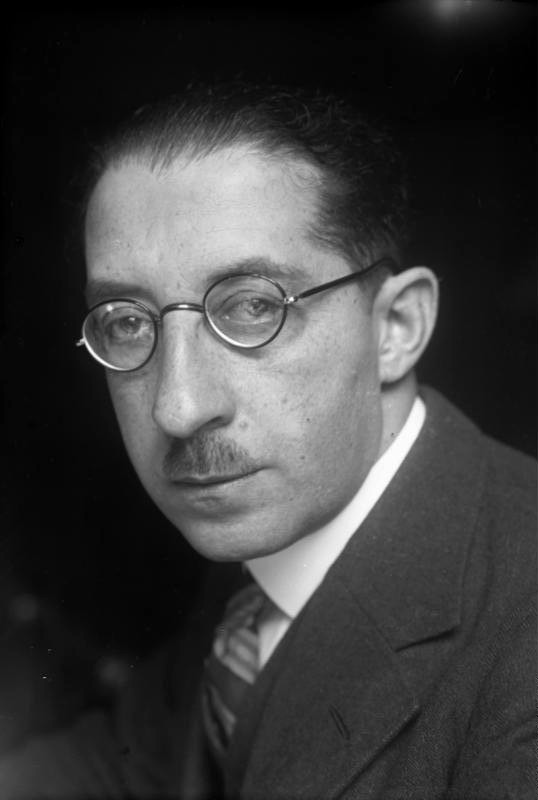
Bernhard Weiss

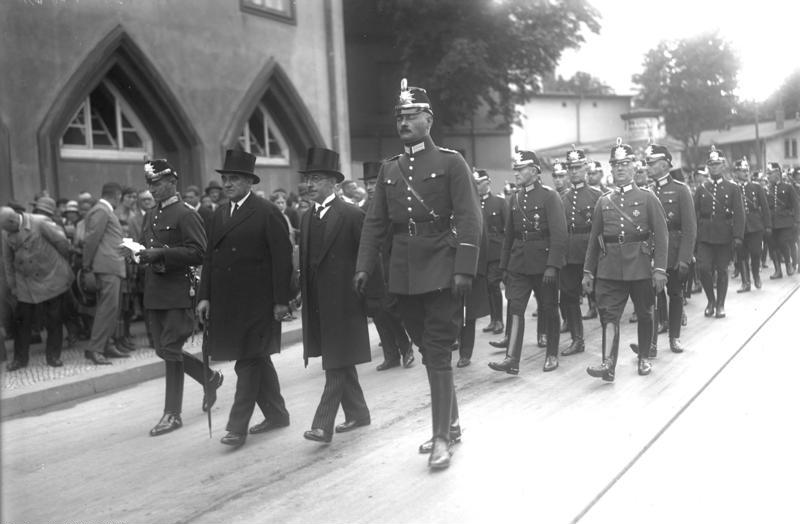
Bernhard Weiss (center) with Magnus Heimannsberg (left), and Albert Grzesinski (right) at the funeral of murdered police officers Paul Anlauf and Franz Lenck, 1931

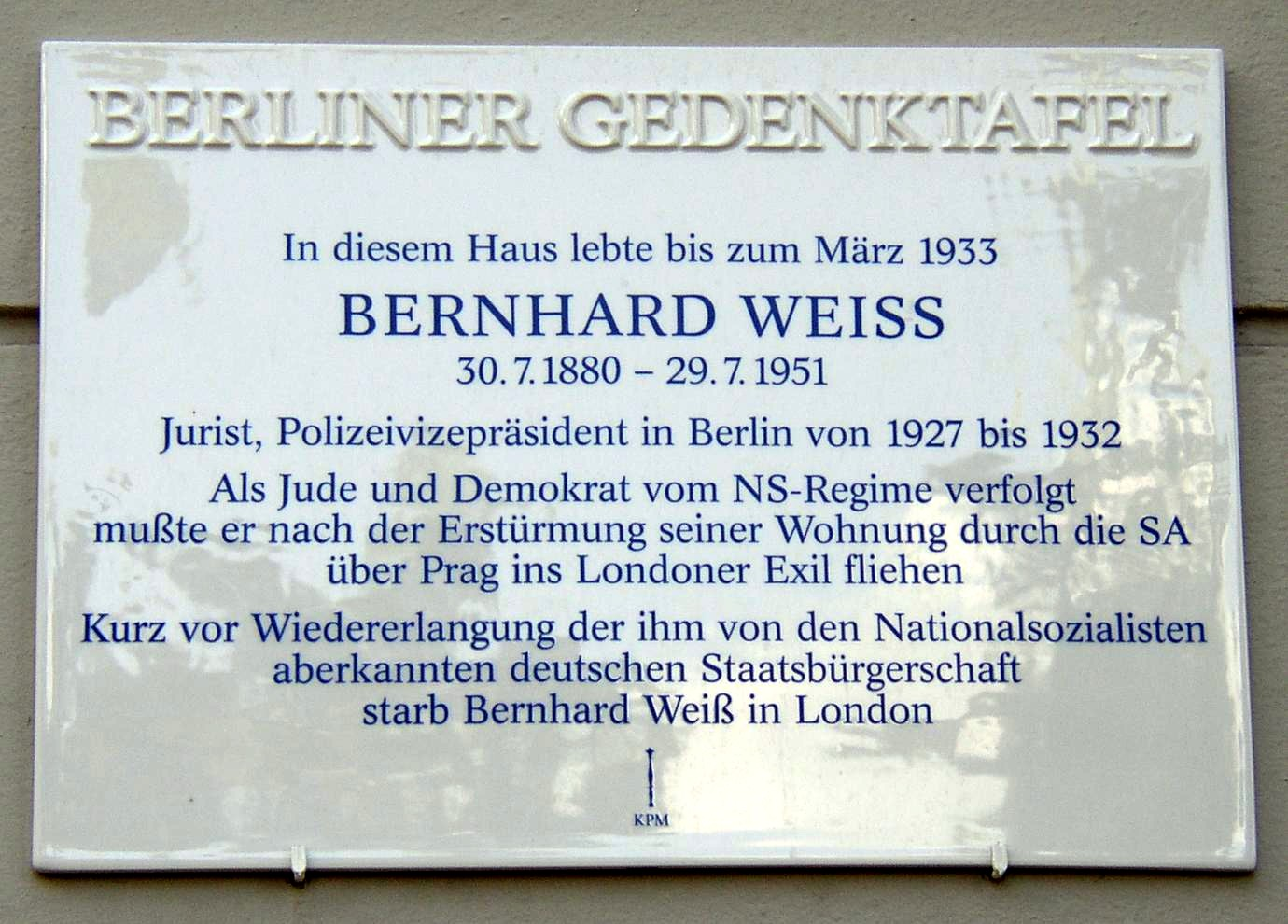
Memorial Plaque in Berlin-Charlottenburg

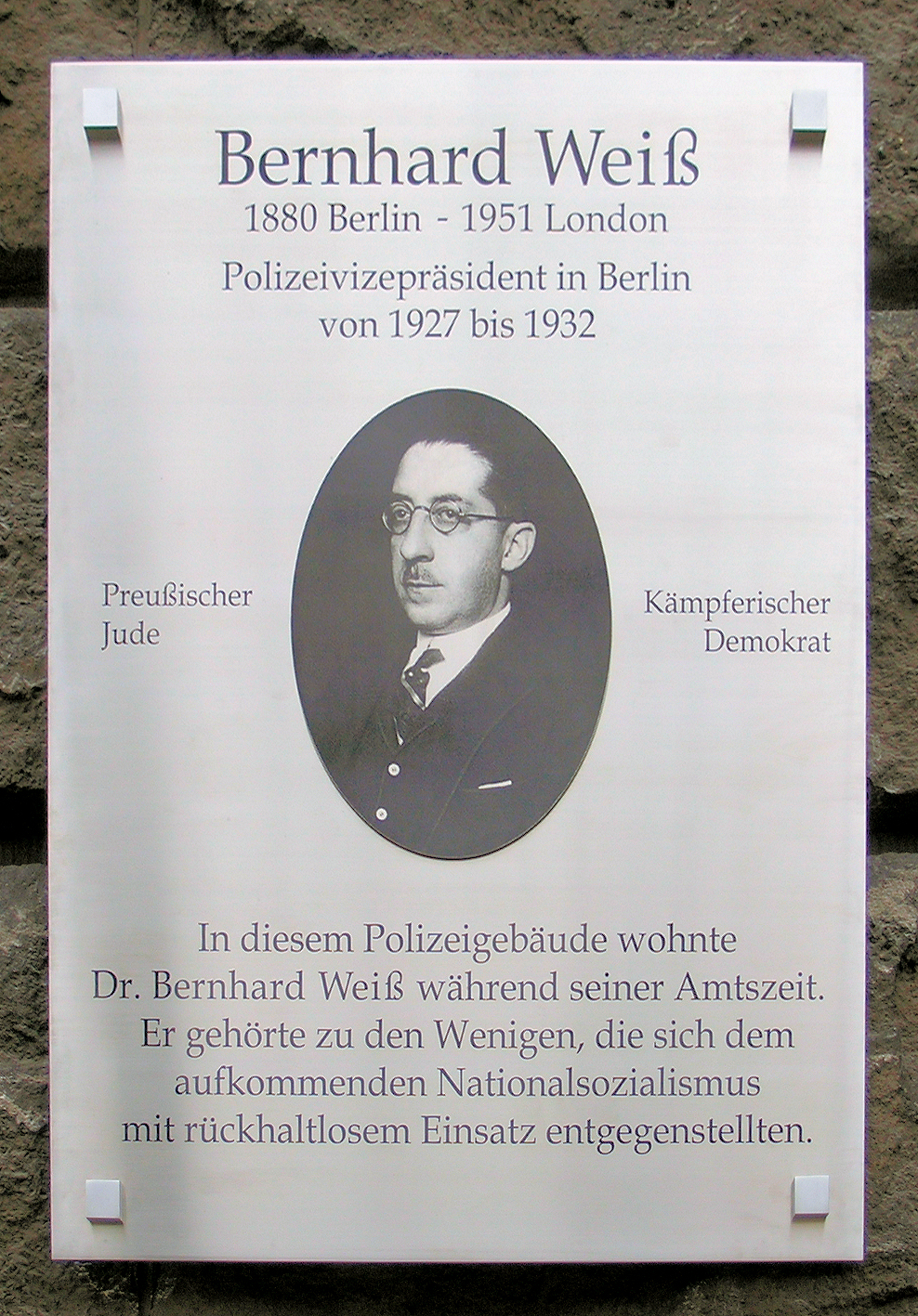
Memorial Plaque at Weiss's home at Kaiserdamm 1, in Berlin-Charlottenburg

Bernhard Weiss (30 July 1880 – 29 July 1951) was a German lawyer and Vice President of the Berlin police during the Weimar Republic. A member of the liberal Deutsche Demokratische Partei, Weiss was known as a key player in the political tensions during the Weimar Republic and a staunch defender of parliamentary democracy against extremists on the left and right.

== Early life ==
Born in Berlin, German Empire into a prominent, liberal Jewish family, Weiss earned a doctorate of law after studying law at the Friedrich Wilhelm University of Berlin, the Ludwig-Maximilians-Universität München, the University of Freiburg, and the University of Würzburg.

In 1904, Weiss volunteered to undergo military training and was commissioned as a reserve officer in the Royal Bavarian Army, since as a Jew, he was not accepted in the Prussian Army. During the First World War, he was promoted to the rank of Rittmeister (captain). Weiss was the officer in charge of a medical company and was awarded the Iron Cross First Class for his services. His three brothers and a cousin also fought in the war. One was killed and another seriously injured.

Active in the Jewish community of Berlin, Weiss was a board member of the (reform) rabbinical seminary and a member of the Centralverein deutscher Staatsbürger jüdischen Glaubens (Central Union of German Citizens of Jewish Belief), the organization dedicated to protecting the civil and social rights of Jews in Germany while at the same time cultivating their German identity.

Weiss made a name for himself as a lawyer and judge before being the first Jew to enter the civil service of pre-Weimar Germany.

== Deputy Chief of the Berlin Criminal Police ==
In 1918, Weiss was appointed Deputy Chief of the Berlin Criminal Police, the Kripo, and became its head in 1925.

In 1920, he was made head of the Political Police and was appointed Vice President of the entire Berlin police force in 1927.

Weiss was a member of the liberal Deutsche Demokratische Partei (German Democratic Party). He played a central role during the political tension in the Weimar Republic, and was a fierce defender of the democratic republic against right-wing and left-wing extremists. The constitutional Weimar Republic was for Germany a radical change from the previous authoritarian regime. From the outset, the Weimar Republic was attacked from both extremes of the political spectrum. Weiss devoted himself to making the Kripo an institution which would defend parliamentary democracy. He was responsible for producing evidence of the subversive activities of the Russian trade delegation in Berlin.

Walther Rathenau, the Jewish industrialist and politician who served Weimar governments in several capacities including that of Foreign Minister was assassinated in 1922, two months after the signing of the Treaty of Rapallo. Weiss was closely involved in the successful hunt for Rathenau's murderers. He was always concerned with the struggles against both the communists and the brownshirts and ordered the confiscation of weapons found at their meetings.

In 1927, Weiss ordered the shutting down of the Berlin branch of the Nazi party and in the same year had 500 of their members arrested for belonging to an illegal organization when they returned from a rally in Nuremberg.

On 12 May 1932, he led a group of police to restore order in the Reichstag building on the request of its president, Paul Löbe, after Nazi deputies assaulted journalist Helmuth Klotz there during the Röhm scandal. Nazi deputies shouted antisemitic slurs at Weiss.

== Confrontations with Joseph Goebbels ==
While in office, Weiss was the target of a constant campaign of vilification organized by Joseph Goebbels, then a prominent Nazi activist, later the Reich Minister of Propaganda. Goebbels nicknamed Weiss "Isidore" and the Weimar Republic as "The Jew's Republic".

Weiss sued Goebbels for libel and won his case. Goebbels did not refrain and Weiss was not intimidated, which led to Weiss suing Goebbels as many as 40-60 times, he won over two dozen libel suits against him and his newspaper Der Angriff. On several occasions, Weiss also prevented Goebbels from speaking at Nazi meetings. Dr. Wilhelm Arnold Drews, former Prussian Minister of the Interior who appointed Weiss, said in 1932, towards the end of Weiss' career: "when we decided to appoint for the Home Service a Jew who was not baptized, we knew that the first had to be the best. It was you I chose, and I am glad to say that you lived up to our expectations."

Franz von Papen, Chancellor of Germany in 1932 and Vice-Chancellor when Adolf Hitler came to power, had both Weiss and his superior arrested, albeit for one day only.

== Weiss's escape to the United Kingdom ==
Weiss finally decided to flee Germany just a few days before Adolf Hitler was made Chancellor. Weiss's police force was ordered to arrest their former Deputy Chief and Hermann Göring offered to pay a reward for anyone who assisted in his capture. The police came looking for Weiss while he and his daughter Hilda were at his siblings' home. They had to bury Weiss in the basement under the coal stack to prevent them from discovering him. They attempted to take Hilda, but her aunt and uncle claimed she was their daughter and the police left. A friend came to Weiss's assistance and drove him out of the country to Czechoslovakia. Weiss then went to the United Kingdom where he opened a printing and stationery business and lived out the remainder of his life.

After his escape, Weiss was subsequently deprived of his German citizenship. In 1951, shortly before becoming a German citizen again, he died of cancer in London.

Weiss's widow, Lotte Weiss (née Buss), returned to live in Berlin immediately after her husband's death. She died in Berlin in 1952.

== Legacy ==
"He was a man of extremes, a Jew imbibing Prussian values, small in stature, large in responsible behaviour and a staunch democrat," wrote Uwe Dannenbaum in an article in the German newspaper Die Welt to mark the naming of the forecourt of the Friedrichstrasse railway station in Berlin in honour of the former police chief.

The film "The Man who chased Goebbels" (2005) by Reiner Mathias Brueckner portrays Weiss as a resolute defender of the republican order.

In 2007, the German Federation of Jewish soldiers established an award in his honour, the Bernhard Weiss Medal, to be awarded to fellow Germans who work for understanding and tolerance.

The forecourt at the Friedrichstrasse station in Berlin and the Alexanderplatzstrasse in central Berlin were named after Bernhard Weiss. A plaque has been erected outside the Berlin house at Steinplatz 310623 Berlin where he lived.

Weiss is Bernie Gunther's boss in many of the detective stories written by Philip Kerr, and particularly in his posthumous novel, Metropolis (2019). In his A Quiet Flame (2008) Kerr has Weiss taking refuge in the Chinese embassy at the time of the Reichstag fire, and then removed by Gunther to the sanctuary of the Hotel Adlon.

Weiss appears in the Gereon Rath series of detective novels set in Berlin by Volker Kutscher.

== Literature ==
- Michael Berger: Bernhard Weiß, preußischer Jude und Offizier. In: Eisernes Kreuz und Davidstern. Die Geschichte Jüdischer Soldaten in Deutschen Armeen. trafo verlag, Berlin 2006, ISBN 3-89626-476-1, p. 203–207.
- Michael Berger: Dr. Bernhard Weiß. Sein Kampf für Demokratie und Rechtsstaat in der Weimarer Republik. In: Eisernes Kreuz – Doppeladler – Davidstern. Juden in deutschen und österreichisch-ungarischen Armeen. Der Militärdienst jüdischer Soldaten durch zwei Jahrhunderte. trafo verlag, Berlin 2010, ISBN 978-3-89626-962-1, p. 146–150.
- Dietz Bering: Kampf um Namen. Bernhard Weiß gegen Joseph Goebbels. Klett-Cotta, Stuttgart 1991.
- Joachim Rott: Bernhard Weiß (1880–1951). Hentrich & Hentrich, Berlin 2008, ISBN 3-938485-54-X.
- Bjoern Weigel: Bernhard Weiß. In: Wolfgang Benz (Hrsg.): Handbuch des Antisemitismus. Judenfeindschaft in Geschichte und Gegenwart. Band 2: Personen. de Gruyter/Saur, Berlin 2009, ISBN 978-3-598-24072-0, p. 880–882.
