= Kino Babylon =

Cinema in Mitte, Berlin, Germany

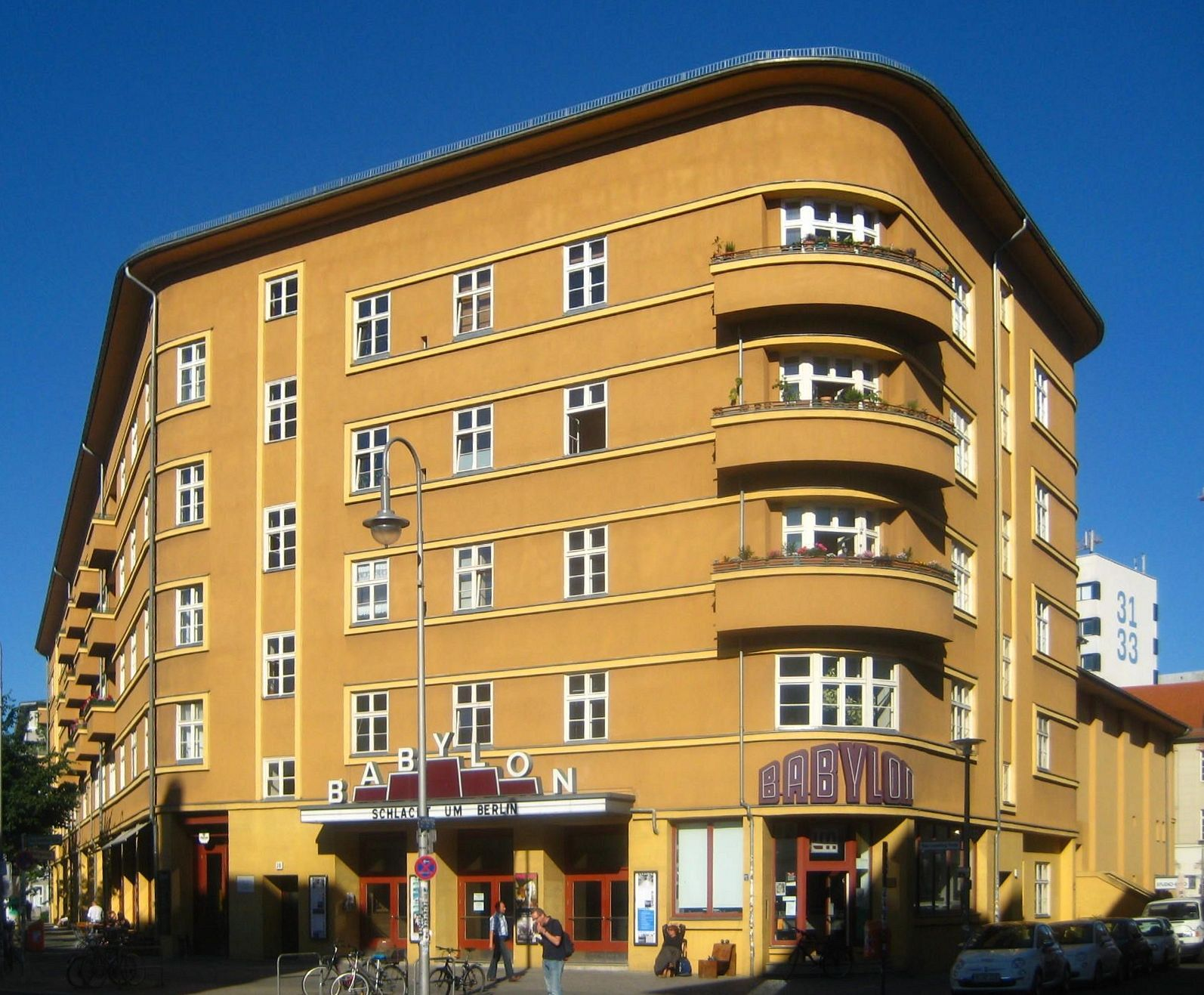
- The Babylon seen from the intersection of Hirtenstraße and Rosa-Luxemburg-Straße
- Interactive map of Kino Babylon
- Location: Rosa-Luxemburg-Straße 30; Berlin, Germany
- Coordinates: 52°31′33″N 13°24′41″E
- Owner: Neue Babylon Berlin GmbH
- Capacity: 520
- Type: Film theatre

Construction
- Built: 1928–29
- Opened: 11 April 1929
- Renovated: 1999–2001

Website
- www.babylonberlin.de

The Kino Babylon is a cinema in the Mitte neighbourhood of Berlin and part of a listed building complex at Rosa-Luxemburg-Platz opposite the Volksbühne theatre. The building was erected 1928–29. It was designed by the architect Hans Poelzig in the Neue Sachlichkeit style. In 1948 the theatre was heavily renovated and served afterward as a speciality cinema for the German Democratic Republic (East Germany). After the auditorium was closed due to risk of collapse, it was restored between 1999 and 2001 in accordance with conservation guidelines. In 2002 the restoration was awarded the "German Award for Monument Protection".

Since 2001 the Babylon has primarily served as revival house as well as a venue for film festivals, musical and literary cultural events. It was a Berlin International Film Festival venue from 2008 to 2010. The cinema was originally host to a single screen with 1200 seats. This has since been split into three screens, with each now seating 500, 68 and 43 people respectively.

== Architecture and construction (1927–1929) ==
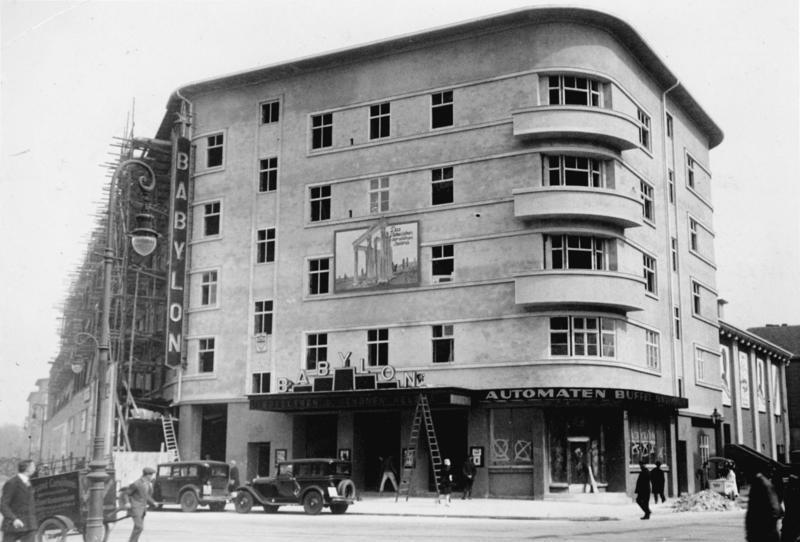
Kino Babylon, 1929

The building contractor Alfred Schrobsdorff (1861–1940) contracted Hans Poelzig to design eight blocks at Bülowplatz, today Rosa-Luxemburg-Platz, between 1927 and 1929. The completed blocks included 170 apartments and 80 shops. The block where the Babylon is located has the form of a triangle along Hirtenstraße, Kleine Alexanderstraße and Weydingerstraße, with the main cinema entrance at "Rosa-Luxemburg-Straße 30." This was the only block of the Poelzig-designed neighbourhood that survived World War II completely intact.

The building is strongly structured horizontally by rows of windows forming stripes and a wide overhanging moulding at the roof plate. The front is ochre-coloured plaster, with stripes painted on plaster in a light yellow shade.

Following Neue Sachlichkeit design principles, the interior design was characterized by economical use of materials and utilisation of the emotional impact of colour and form:

From a spacious, in grey, red and yellow kept vestibule, from where two broad stairs lead upwards to the rood loft, one gets to the imposing auditorium, that is given a warm and cosy mood without many extravagant decorative forms. Wall and ceiling are painted in a shaded yellow, the gallery niche and the stalls are painted red and contrast with a narrow copper-coloured band, the balustrade of the seats is blue. The seats are covered with velvet of the same colour. The wooden working of the doors and the grilles of the heating and ventilation system are painted in red.

— Walter Curt Behrendt, Die Baugilde, 9/1927

Poelzig also worked as set designer and architect for film and theatre of the 1920s. The most important film in collaboration with him was The Golem: How He Came into the World (1920) by Paul Wegener and Carl Boese. In addition to the Babylon, Poelzig designed two other cinemas; the "Capitol am Zoo" (1924–26) in Berlin and the "Kino Deli" (1926/1927) in Wrocław, now in Poland, but at that time it was part of Germany and known as Breslau.

== History until restoration (1929–1999) ==
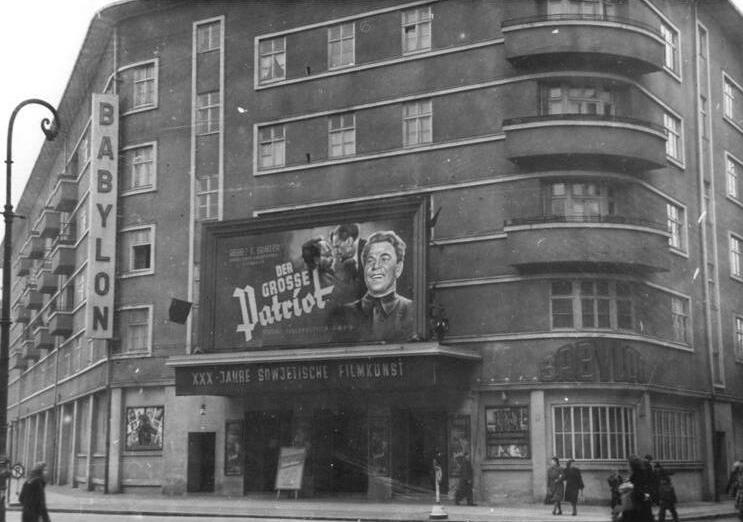
Kino Babylon, 1949

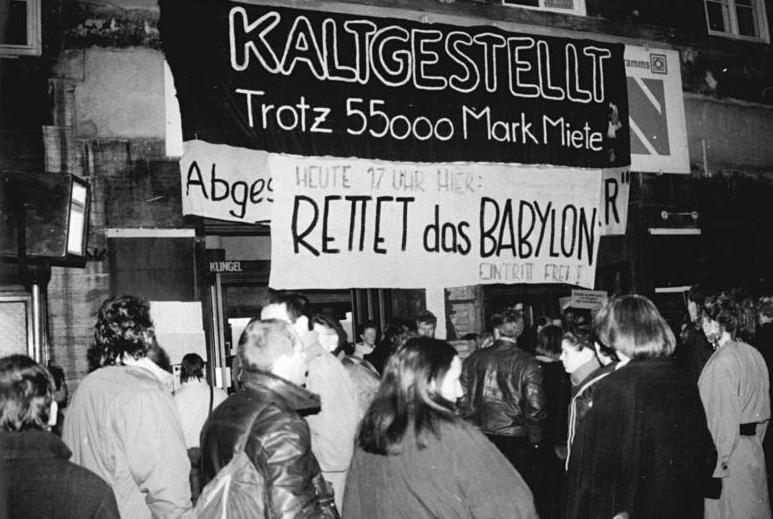
Demonstration against the closure of the cinema, 9 January 1990

In 1929 the Babylon opened as a silent film cinema with an orchestra pit and a cinema organ for musical accompaniment. During the 1948 renovation the orchestra pit was closed and the organ dismantled. One of the Babylon's projectionists, Rudolf Lunau, was a member of an illegal resistance cell of the Communist Party of Germany from 1933 until his arrest in 1934. He held meetings in "his" projection room, where he also hid opponents of the regime who went underground. At the beginning of the 1980s a metal plaque was placed in the foyer of the cinema to commemorate him.

After the Second World War the Babylon, then in the Soviet occupation zone, reopened on 18 May 1948 as a première theatre under direction of the Sovexportfilm agency in Germany. From 1949 until 1989, under East German rule, the Kino Babylon showed specialist films, for example, screening films from the State Film Archive of the GDR and state film and television programme-makers. From 1984 to 1989, amongst other offerings, it showed documentary films made by the state-owned DEFA studios. In 1993 the auditorium had to be closed by the building authorities because it was in danger of collapsing. As a result, the foyer of the cinema was converted into a temporary stage with 68 seats.

== Restoration (1999–2001) ==
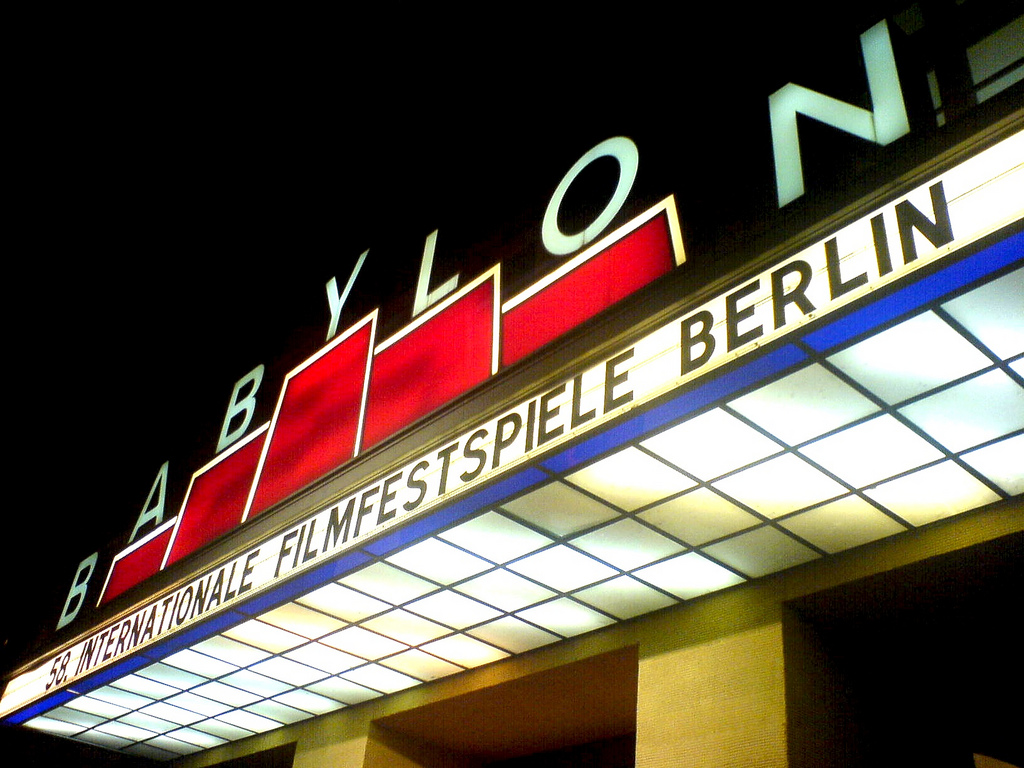
Entrance during the Berlinale, February 2008

The two-year redevelopment of the Babylon began in 1999. It cost ten million Marks and was mainly funded by the German government. Lottery development funds of two million Euros were given for the seats and technical equipment. The roof and the ceiling of the large auditorium were refurbished. Wooden joists in the ceiling, which were no longer able to support the weight, were replaced by steel girders and a new roof was erected over them. The front of the building was also restored.

The aim of the restoration was not to return the building to how it looked at a particular point in time, but to keep various elements from throughout the building's history. The foyer was returned to how it was when the building opened in 1928 and the auditorium was renovated to its 1948 style, with plush seating and stucco and gilded details. The building was originally used as both a cinema and a theatre and therefore had a back stage area behind the screen. This was where new smaller auditorium was built as part of the restoration. The orchestra pit of the large auditorium was restored, so that a chamber orchestra can play live music during screenings of silent films. In 1999, the 70-year-old J. D. Philipps cinema organ was restored. It is the only cinema organ in Germany that is still played in its original location.

In May 2001 the reopening of the auditorium took place with the film Othello by Orson Welles. In 2002 the "Berlin film art Babylon" association was awarded the "Silver Hemisphere" by the German Foundation for Monument Protection. The architects Joachim Roemer and Klaus Meyer-Rogge were honoured for saving a "key building of cinema architecture".

The restored cinema organ was relaunched on 26 May 2001 at a screening of The Golem: How He Came into the World. This was followed by a series of silent film concerts with the pianist Stephan von Bothmer.

== Film festivals ==
The Babylon was a Berlin International Film Festival (Berlinale) venue from 2008 (when it hosted its new "Generation14plus" event) to 2010, but has not been listed as such since 2011.

The cinema has hosted, and continues to host, several other film festivals, including the Berlin Independent Film Festival, the Türkisches Film Festival Berlin, and the Berlin Documentary Film Festival (DocBerlin),

The theater also continues host political programs such as

- December 2017 show for Ken Jebsen
- February 2020 screening of Vaxxed 2
- November 2017 and May 2025 shows with Daniele Ganser
- October 2025 Panel discussion about "War and Peace" with Holger Friedrich, Kay-Achim Schönbach, Michael von der Schulenburg, Martin Sonneborn, and Florian Warweg.

== Dispute (2009) ==
In 2009 some employees, who were members of the anarcho-syndicalist Free Workers' Union (FAU), sought higher wages and better working conditions. At the end of July 2009 the Berlin section of the FAU called for a boycott of the cinema. The Ver.di trade union signed a collective agreement with the employees starting on 1 January 2010. In 2009 the operator of the cinema instigated a legal dispute with the FAU, regarding its right to designate itself as a trade union. In October 2009, the Berlin-Brandenburg employment court decided that the FAU had the right to negotiate pay settlements. A temporary injunction, imposed by the Berlin high court in December 2009, forbade the FAU Berlin from calling itself a trade union until further notice. This was overturned by the Supreme Court in June 2010.
