= Rosa-Luxemburg-Platz station =

Station of the Berlin U-Bahn

Rosa-Luxemburg-Platz
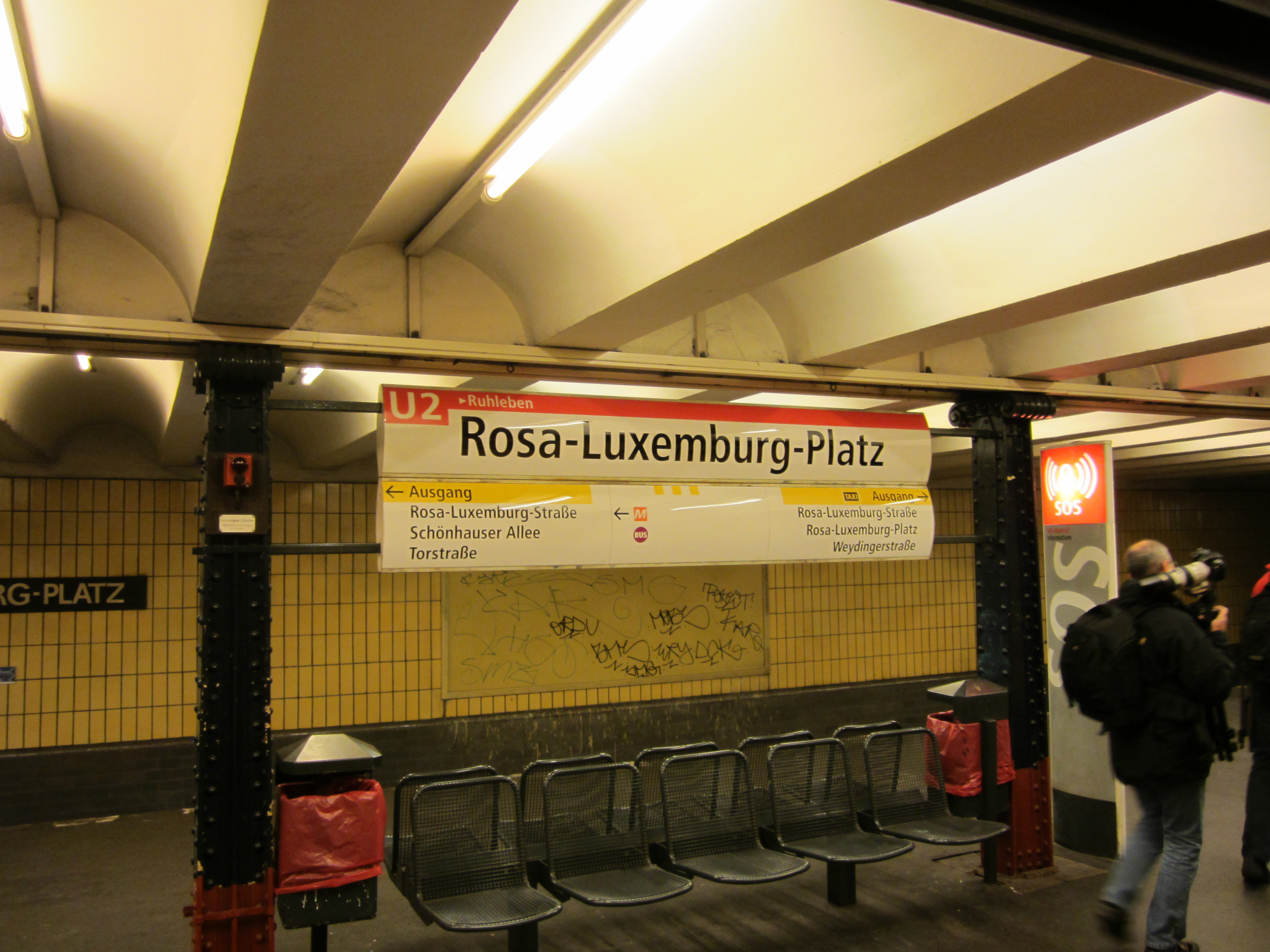
- Station sign

General information
- Location: Berlin; Germany
- Coordinates: 52°31′39″N 13°24′38″E
- Owner: BVG
- Operator: BVG
- Platforms: 1 island platform
- Tracks: 2
- Train operators: U-Bahn Berlin
- Connections: N2

Construction
- Structure type: Underground
- Parking: No
- Cycle facilities: Yes
- Accessible: No

Other information
- Station code: Sz
- Fare zone: VBB: Berlin A/5555

History
- Opened: 27 July 1913; 113 years ago

Services
Preceding station	Berlin U-Bahn	Following station
Alexanderplatz towards Ruhleben	U2	Senefelderplatz towards Pankow
Route map
Location
- Location within Berlin Location within Germany Location within Europe

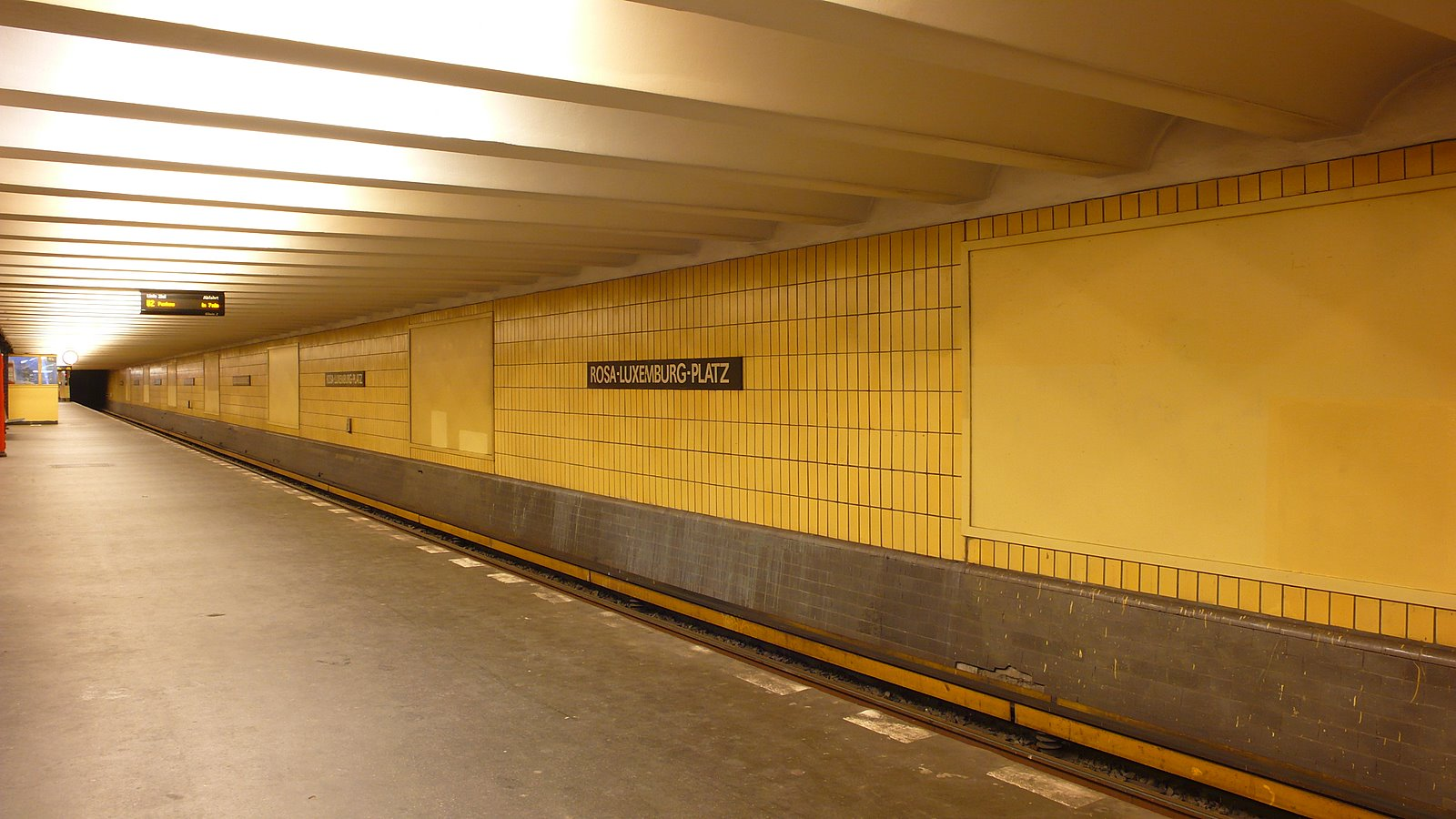
Platform view

Rosa-Luxemburg-Platz is a Berlin U-Bahn station located on the U2. It was formerly called Schönhauser Tor and is located at the foot of Schönhauser Allee, at the corner of Torstraße. The color of the station is yellow.

== History ==
Built in 1913 and designed by Alfred Grenander, the station bears its original name of "Schönhauser Tor" (English: Schönhausen Gate). In 1934 the name was changed to "Horst-Wessel-Platz" (English: Horst Wessel Square), named after the Nazi Party stormtrooper Horst Wessel who died on 23 February 1930.

On 16 April 1945, this station was totally destroyed in Battle of Berlin. After the war in 1945 the name was reverted to its original. In 1950 it was renamed to Luxemburgplatz (Luxemburg Square) and finally in 1978 it was renamed to Rosa-Luxemburg-Platz to avoid confusion with the country. Rosa-Luxemburg-Platz was named after the Polish-German socialist, Rosa Luxemburg in 1969.

== Specifications ==
The station is 813 meters from the Alexanderplatz and 595 meters from the Senefelderplatz stations respectively. The central platform is 7.6 meters wide and 110.1 meters long, while the hall is 2.7 meters high. Due to its small depth beneath the pavement of four meters, it is classified as an Unterpflasterbahn Station. A lift was added to the station in 2023 to improve accessibility.
