= Karl-Liebknecht-Haus =

Headquarters of German political party The Left

Coordinates: 52°31′34″N 13°24′47″E

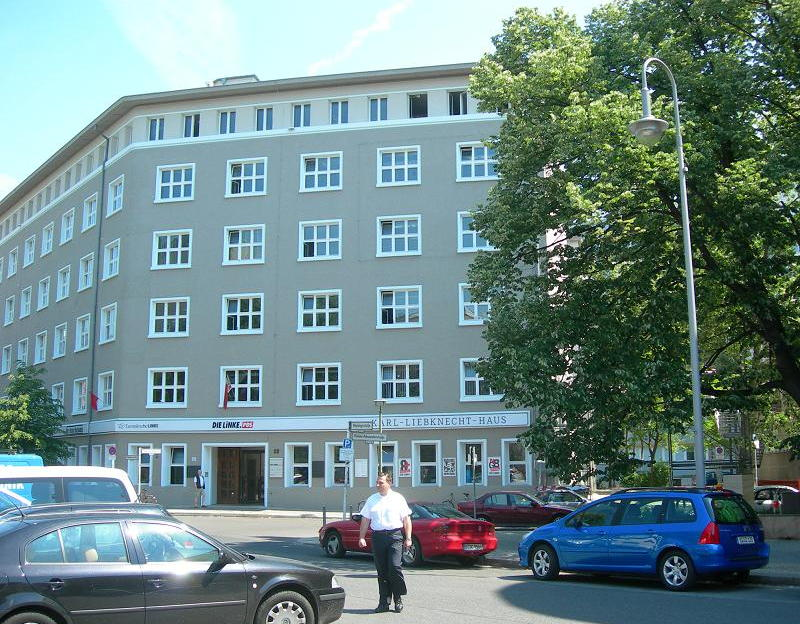
Karl-Liebknecht-Haus in 2007

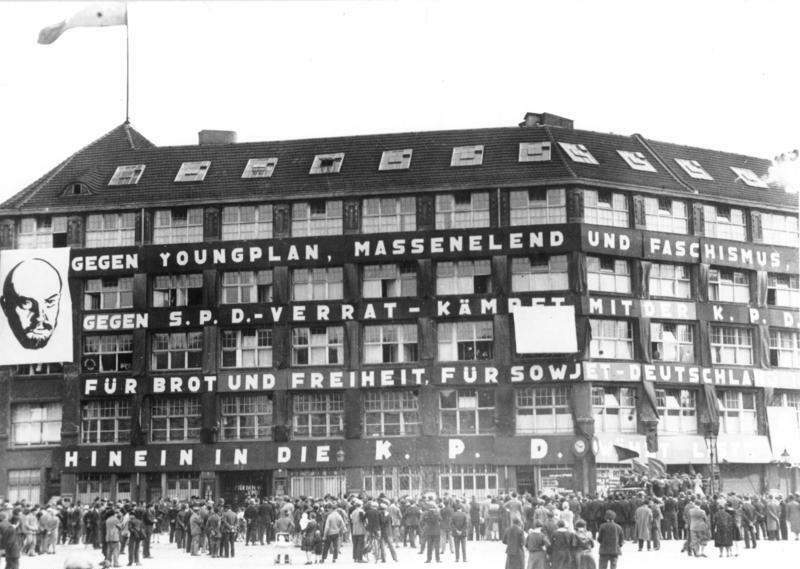
Karl-Liebknecht-Haus in 1930

The Karl-Liebknecht-Haus or Karl Liebknecht House is the headquarters of the party The Left in Germany. It is located between Alexanderplatz and Rosa-Luxemburg-Platz in Berlin-Mitte.

Constructed in 1912 as a factory, the building was purchased by the Communist Party of Germany (Kommunistische Partei Deutschlands, KPD) in 1926. It became the seat of its Central Committee and was named in honor of Karl Liebknecht, the KPD leader who was murdered by a paramilitary unit in January 1919. After Adolf Hitler was appointed as German chancellor, the Berlin police raided the headquarters, and by March 1, the Nazi swastika flag was flying over the building. Renamed the Horst Wessel House, the building at first served as a district police station and detention center in which Jews and political opponents were tortured. In 1935, the finance department of the state of Prussia moved into the building.

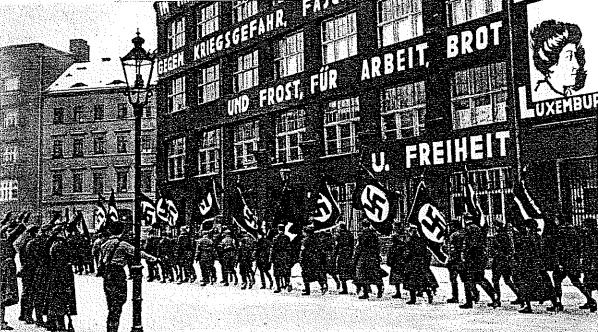
The house was occupied by the NSDAP.

Severely damaged during World War II, the building was repaired in 1948, and the name "Karl Liebknecht House" restored. It housed the East German Institute for Marxism-Leninism after 1950.

The building became the headquarters for the Party of Democratic Socialism (PDS), the reformed successor of East Germany's former ruling party, in May 1990. In 2005, the PDS was renamed "The Left Party PDS" in preparation for its merger with the Party of Social Justice-Electoral Alternative (WASG). The building continues to serve as the headquarters of the new party, which is called simply "The Left" (Die Linke) after the merger was completed in June 2007.
