= Magnus Heimannsberg =

German police officer

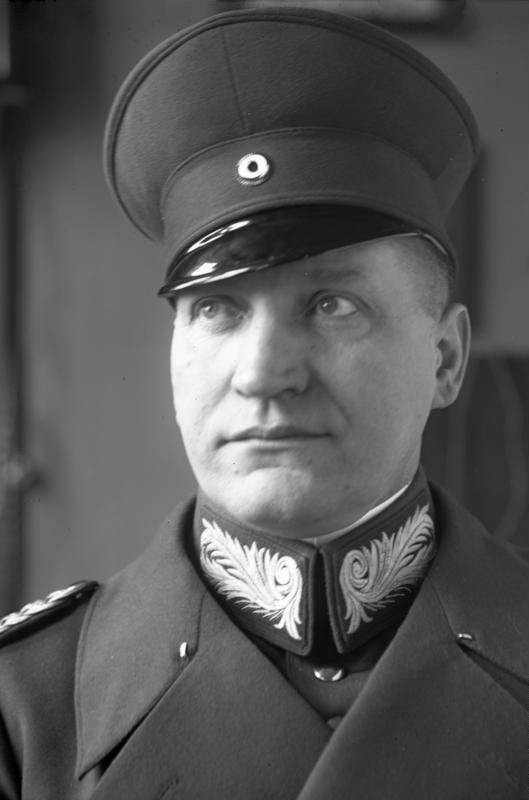
Heimannsberg (1931)

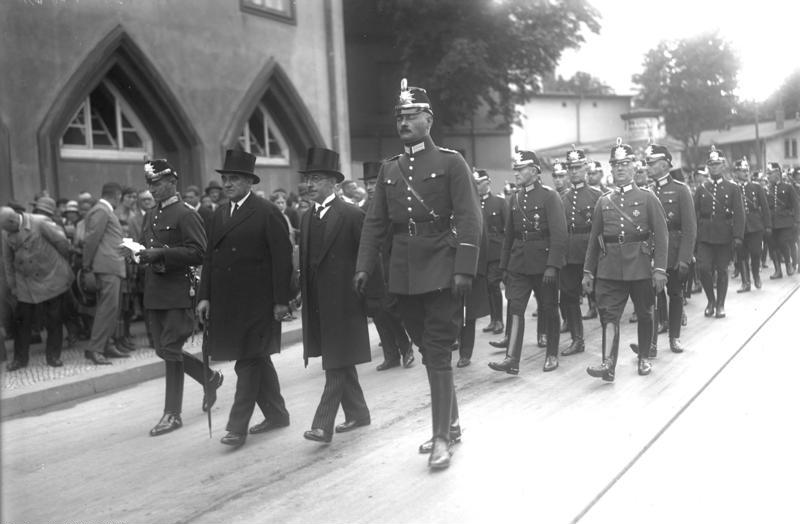
Heimannsberg during the funeral of murdered police officers Paul Anlauf and Franz Lenck in 1931

Magnus Heimannsberg (15 August 1881 – 10 May 1962) was the commander of the Berlin Schutzpolizei during the Weimar Republic, and played a pivotal role in protecting the republic against political extremists to the right and left (i.e., against Nazis and Communists). Appointed chief of all uniformed Berlin Police in 1927, he was a rare case of a German police leader who had worked his way up from constable to the top. Hailed as an exemplar of a "new breed of people's police officers," he led repeated interventions in street protests and riots aimed at disrupting the rule of law. Enormously popular with patrolmen, he spoke out against threats to the republic at a time when many other police leaders were preparing for a Nazi takeover. He was illegally removed from his position following the dismissal of the Prussian government in the July 1932 Preußenschlag, and was briefly imprisoned by the Nazis both in 1933 and 1944. After the Second World War, he was appointed head of police in Greater Hesse by the Americans. He was President of Police in the Hessian capital Wiesbaden from 1948 until his retirement.

== Literature ==
- Hsi-Huey Liang: Die Berliner Polizei in der Weimarer Republik. Berlin 1977
