= Rosa-Luxemburg-Straße (Berlin) =

Street in Berlin, Germany

Coordinates: 52°31′36″N 13°24′40″E

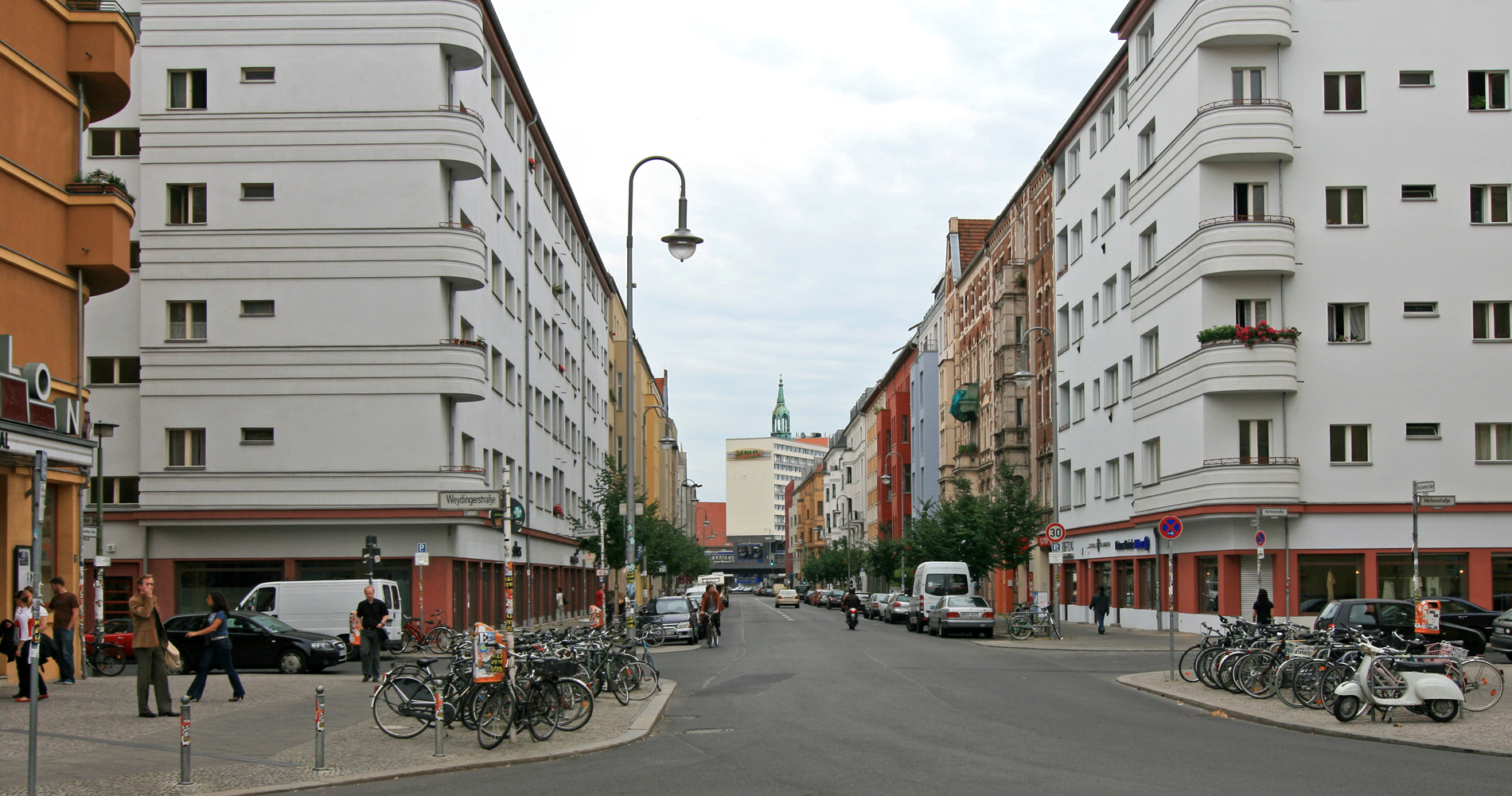
- Rosa-Luxemburg-Straße looking west from the square
- Interactive map of Rosa-Luxemburg-Straße
- Former name: Kaiser-Wilhelm-Straße
- Namesake: Rosa Luxemburg
- Type: Street

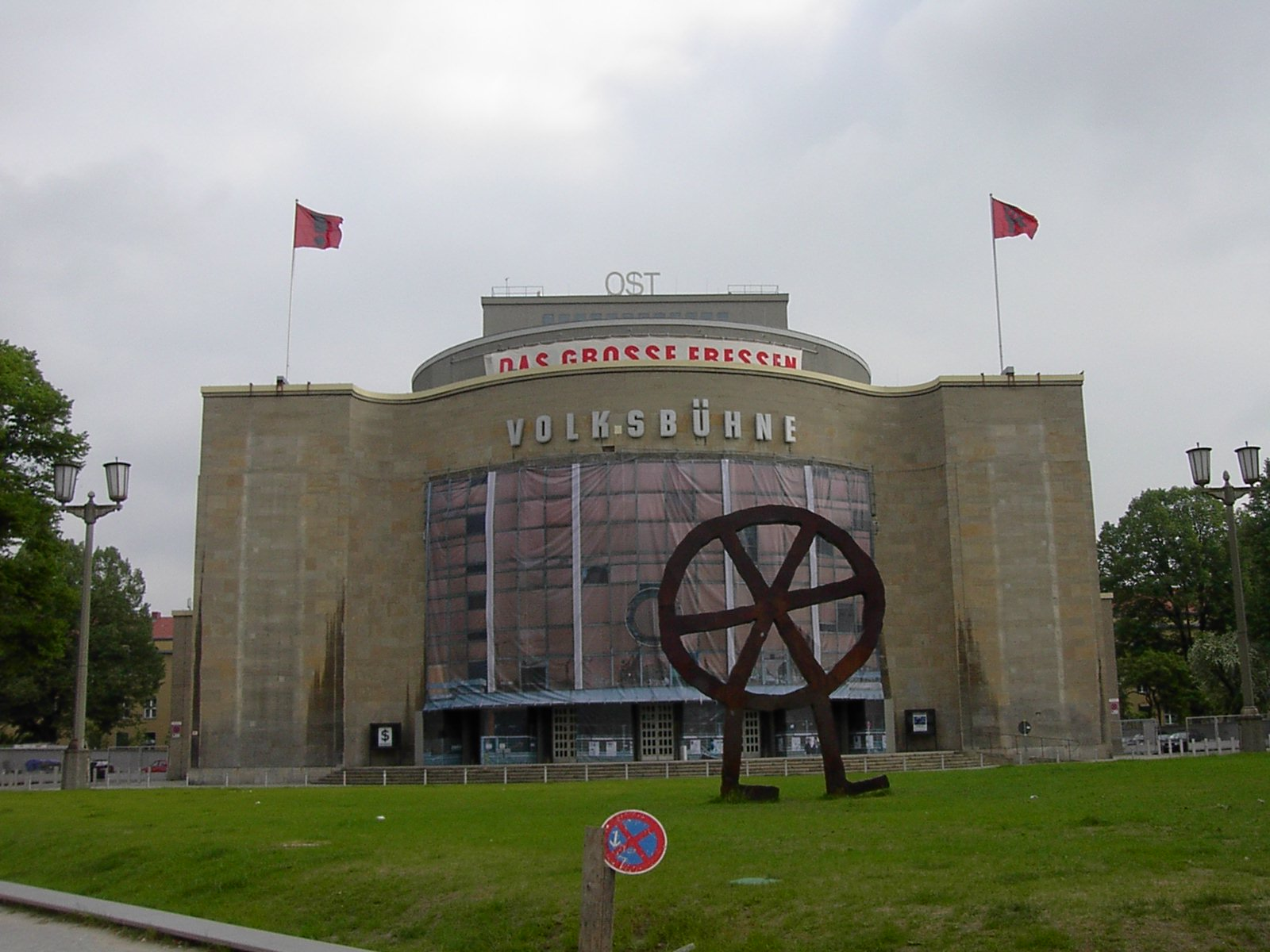
The Volksbühne at Rosa-Luxemburg-Platz

Rosa-Luxemburg-Straße is a street in central Berlin, the capital of Germany. The street runs north from Dircksenstraße in the inner eastern part of the city, to Torstraße where it becomes Schönhauser Allee. The best-known building on Rosa-Luxemburg-Straße is the Volksbühne ("people's theatre") at Rosa-Luxemburg-Platz (which was called Bülowplatz before World War II and Horst-Wessel-Platz during the Nazi period).

Before World War II, Rosa-Luxemburg-Straße was not a separate street, but a continuation of Kaiser-Wilhelm-Straße, the rest of which is now called Karl-Liebknecht-Straße. During the years of the German Democratic Republic it was named for Rosa Luxemburg, a leading Marxist theoretician and one of the leaders of the Spartacist League, who was killed following the unsuccessful Communist Spartacist uprising in Berlin in 1919. It is one of the few streets in East Berlin named for a prominent Communist that has retained its name following the reunification of Germany in 1990.
