= Rosa-Luxemburg-Platz =

Square in Berlin-Mitte, Germany

Coordinates: 52°31′37″N 13°24′40″E

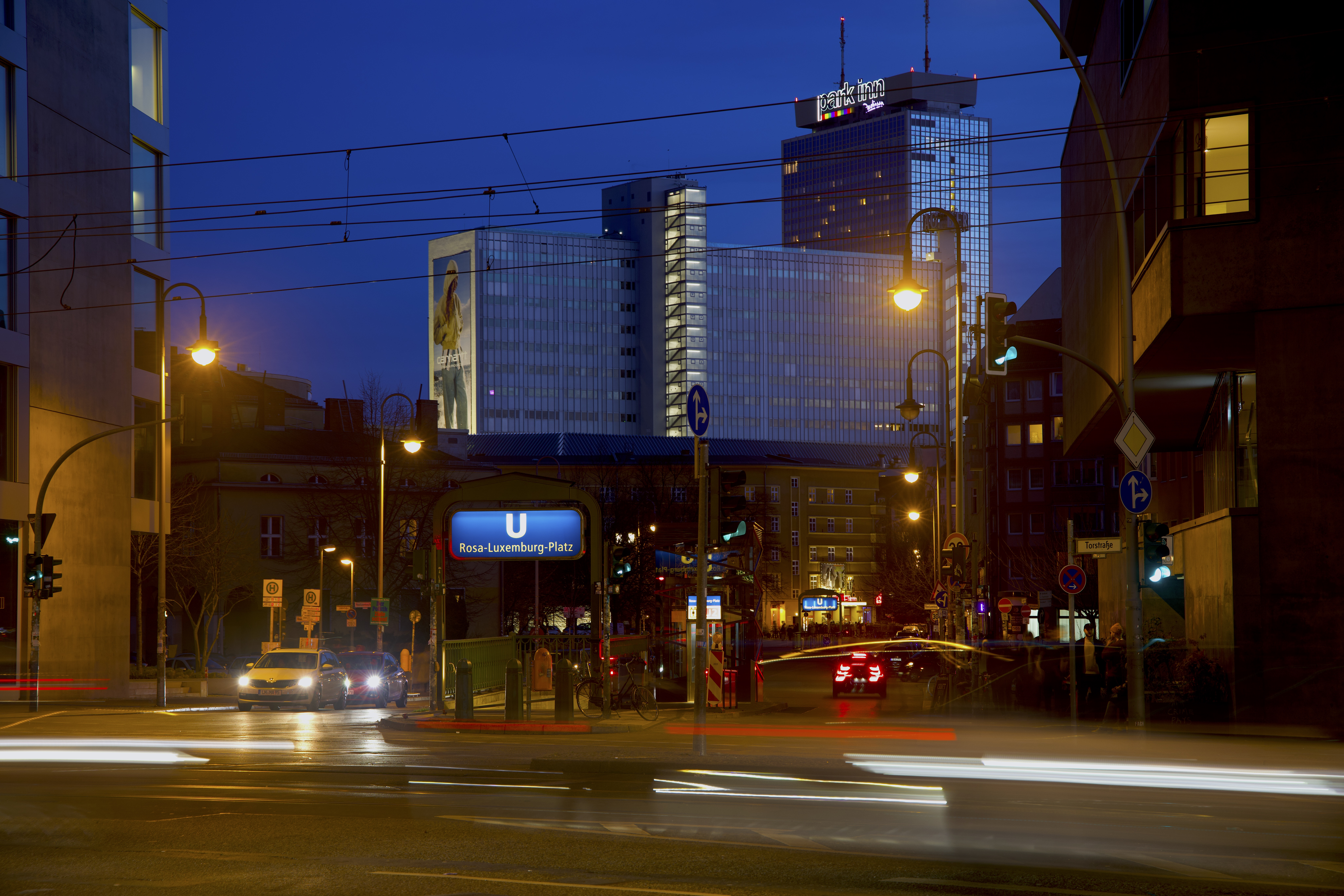
- Entrance to Rosa-Luxemburg-Platz U-Bahn station at night
- Interactive map of Rosa-Luxemburg-Platz
- Former names: Babelsberger Platz (1907–1910); Bülowplatz (1910–1933); Horst-Wessel-Platz (1933–1945); Liebknechtplatz (1945–1947); Luxemburgplatz (1947–1969)
- Type: Town square
- Area: Mitte
- Location: Rosa-Luxemburg-Straße
- Nearest metro station: Rosa-Luxemburg-Platz

Construction
- Commissioned: 1905

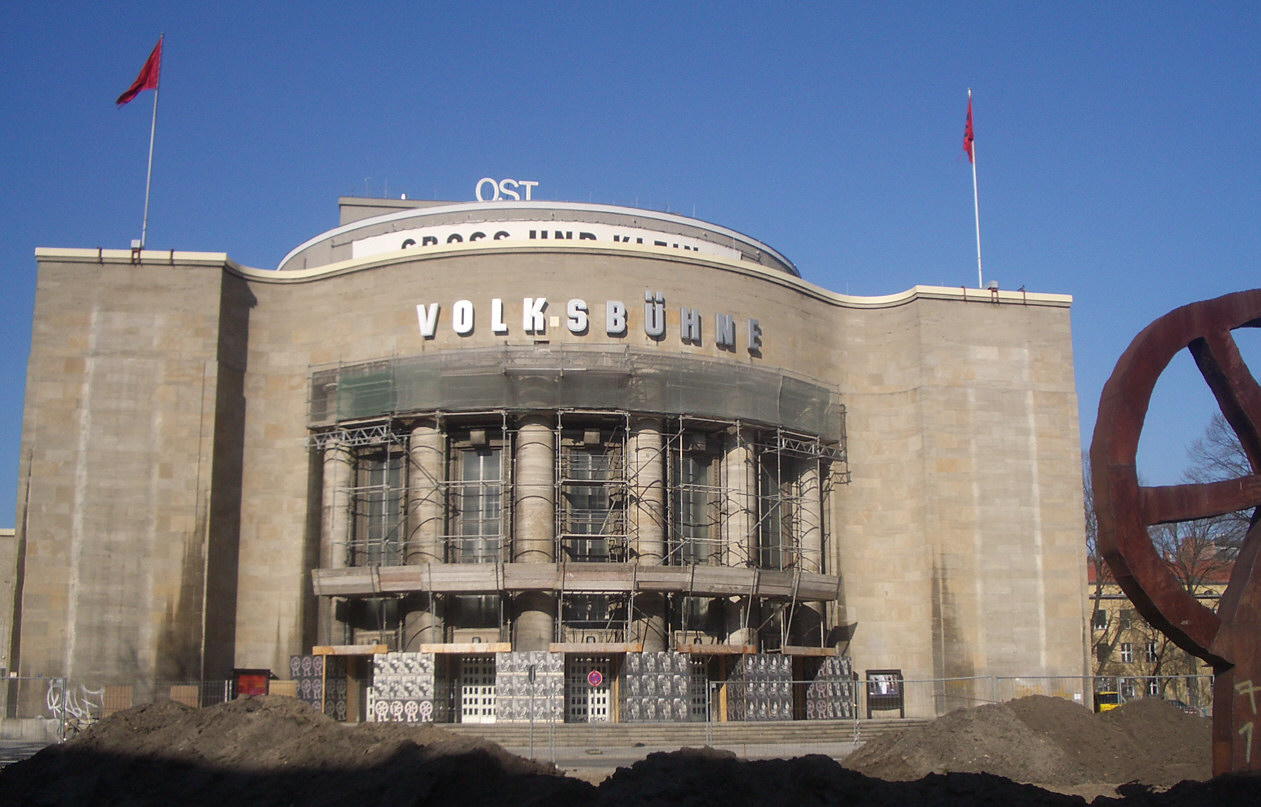
Volksbühne, erected 1914. Architect: Oskar Kaufmann (rebuilt 1954 following a World War II bombardment.)

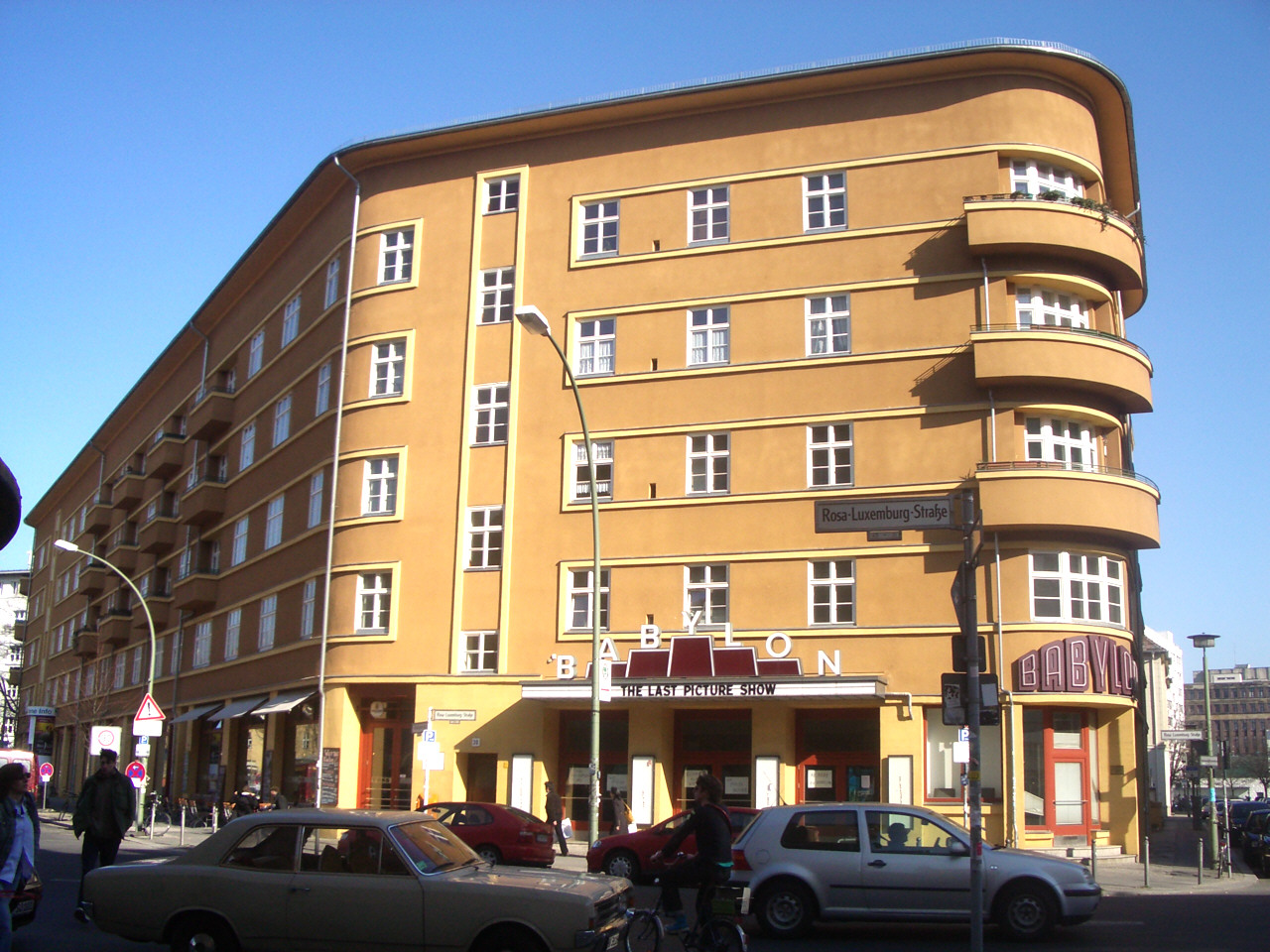
Babylon cinema. Architect: Hans Poelzig

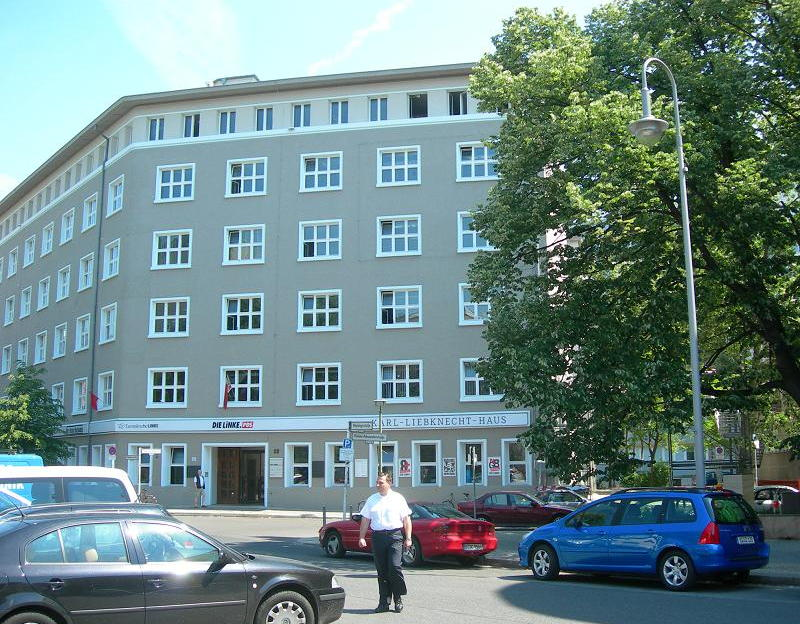
Karl-Liebknecht-Haus, headquarters of the German Left Party in 2007

Rosa-Luxemburg-Platz, formerly the Bülowplatz, is a square in Berlin-Mitte, Germany.

== History ==
The square is dominated by the Volksbühne (the "People's Theatre", built 1913-14) and by the Karl-Liebknecht-Haus, the headquarters of the German Left Party. The party's predecessor, the Communist Party of Germany (KPD), opened its headquarters on the square in 1926. The square was also home to the headquarters of Die Rote Fahne. Prior to 1933 it was considered the centre of German communism, with the writer Erich Weinert penning an ode in Berlin dialect to its unique character:

Ich komme uff'n Bülowplatz
und denke, wat is los?
der hat ja Polizeibesatz
Hier is 'ne Staatsaktion, mein Schatz!
Hier jibt's Zussammenstoss.

The square was previously named Babelsberger Platz (1907–1910) and Bülowplatz (1910–1933), and was the focus of one of the last mass demonstrations in Berlin against the Nazi Party on January 25, 1933—five days before Adolf Hitler was appointed German Chancellor. Later that year, with the rise of the Third Reich, it was renamed Horst-Wessel-Platz (1933–1945) after National Socialist martyr Horst Wessel. Following the fall of Berlin and Soviet occupation, the square, then part of communist-controlled East Berlin, was renamed Liebknechtplatz (1945–1947) after German communist Karl Liebknecht. It was then renamed Luxemburgplatz (1947–1969) after communist leader Rosa Luxemburg, until it was given the name Rosa-Luxemburg-Platz by the East German regime in 1969.

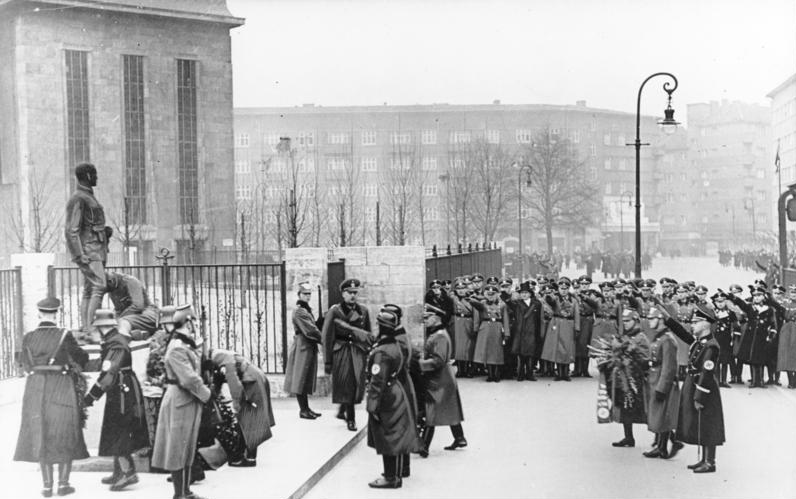
German policemen lay a wreath on the monument to Captains Anlauf and Lenck during the Day of the German Police, January 16, 1937. In 1951, Erich Mielke, one of the murderers, ordered the demolition of the monument.

The square is noted as the scene of the murders of Paul Anlauf and Franz Lenck, police captains who were the victims of a double homicide in 1931 at the hands of members of the KPD. A monument created by Hans Dammann commemorating Anlauf and Lenck was erected in the square in 1934; although a metal statue of Anlauf and Lenck was melted down during the Second World War as part of a metal recycling campaign ("Metallspende des deutschen Volkes"), the rest of the monument was destroyed in 1950 on the orders of Erich Mielke, one of the murderers, who was by then a member of the Central Committee of the Socialist Unity Party of Germany and a State Secretary in the newly formed Ministry of State Security.
