= Leow =

Leow is a surname. Notable people with the surname include:

- Julian Leow Beng Kim (born 1964), Malaysian prelate of the Catholic Church
- June Leow (born 1964), Malaysian politician
- Willy Leow (1887–1937), German communist politician and activist
- Philip Leow (born 1996), Guyanese-American businessman
