= Helene Overlach =

German politician (1894–1983)

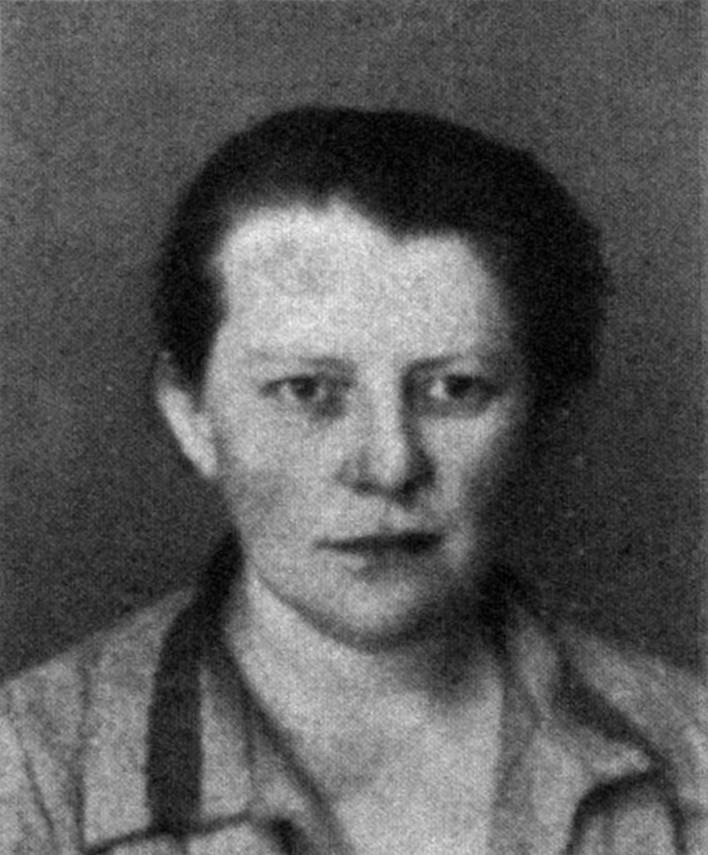
- Overlach c. 1928

Member of the Reichstag for Düsseldorf East
- In office 1 July 1928 – 28 February 1933
- Preceded by: Multi-member district
- Succeeded by: Constituency abolished

Personal details
- Born: 10 July 1894 Greiz, Principality of Reuss-Greiz, German Empire
- Died: 7 August 1983 (aged 89) East Berlin, East Germany
- Party: KPD (1920–1946); SED (after 1946)
- Children: Hanna
- Parent: Martin Overlach (father)
- Occupation: Politician; Activist; Party Functionary; Journalist; Education Administrator
- Central institution membership: 1929–1932: Candidate member, KPD Politburo; 1927–1935: Full member, KPD Central Committee

Helene Overlach (19 July 1894 – 7 August 1983) was a German Communist party official and politician. Unusually for a woman at that time, between 1928 and 1933 she served as a member of the German parliament ("Reichstag") in Berlin, representing Electoral District 22 (Düsseldorf East). During the Hitler years her relatively high political profile before 1933 earned her the close attention of the security services. She survived, despite spending much of the time during those twelve years in prisons and concentration camps: her health was badly affected.

== Biography ==
=== Provenance and early years ===
Helene Overlach was born in Greiz, a small manufacturing town in the hill country south of Leipzig. She was the third of her parents' four recorded children. Martin Overlach, her father, worked as a doctor. Despite being an unusually liberal minded man, happy alike to treat the urban poor and members of the family of the local prince, Martin Overlach was not politically involved. In 1904 the family relocated, like hundreds of others at this time, to Berlin. As a girl Helene Overlach attended school locally. Her father's death in 1912 left the family in financial difficulties and she was obliged to take a full-time office job. She then went on to complete a commercial apprenticeship during 1915/16. Following the outbreak of war in the late summer of 1914 she had, in addition, volunteered as a nursing auxiliary at one of the city's improvised military hospitals. In 1915 one of her brothers died as a result of war injuries sustained at the front.

=== Communist ===
It is not clear how politically active Helene Overlach had been in 1914, but by the time the war ended four years later she was committed to the political left, which in Germany at the time correlated with uncompromising anti-militarism and opposition to the war. The war had been conducted for and by imperialists, while the workers had paid the price in blood and impoverishment, according to a political pamphlet she came across in 1917 which turned out to have been produced by a (still virtually unknown) Russian Marxist identifying himself as Vladimir Lenin. As the German emperor abdicated and headed abroad, hundreds of thousands of Germans would have agreed. In 1920 Helene Overlach became a member of the Young Communists ("Kommunistischer Jugendverband Deutschlands" / KJVD) which had grown out of the Free Socialist Youth ("Freie sozialistische Jugend" / FSJ) organisation which she had joined some months earlier. During the first part of 1919 she supported herself by working as a teacher at a Berlin business school, but in October of that year she relocated to Munich where she worked as a typist in a lawyer's office. Her stay in Munich seems to have been brief, since according to at least one source, during 1920 she joined the Communist Party itself, not in Munich but as a member of the party's regional party group, far to the north, in the Hamburg-Wasserkante region. In 1921 she also took a job with the party, working as a typist-secretary at the young party's main office in Berlin. During this period she worked for a time with Wilhelm Pieck, a clever and ambitious politician who would emerge nearly thirty years later as the first president of the German Democratic Republic (East Germany). Overlach continued to be employed as a typist-secretary by the Communist Party until 1925. This included some time during 1922/23 based in Düsseldorf at the party's main office for the heavily industrialised western region, where she worked principally for party comrade Walter Stoecker.

=== Party journalist ===
Although her typing and secretarial were evidently more noteworthy and valued by the party in the 1920s than equivalent abilities would have become a century later, Helene Overlach also found time to branch out into politicised journalism. Form 1924 she worked as an editor on the "Ruhr Echo", a party newspaper produced in Essen. Shortly after that she worked for several months as editor in chief at another regional party newspaper, the Haniver-based "Niedersächsische Arbeiterzeitung". Around this time she is also identified as a contributing editor on the "Schlesische Arbeiter-Zeitung" ("Silesian Workers' Newspaper"), a party regional newspaper produced in Breslau (as Wrocław was known) before 1945).

=== Party networking and party promotions ===
Helene Overlach's work at the heart of the party bureaucracy meant that she came to know leading party members, several of whom appear to have been impressed by her. One particularly memorable encounter involved Klara Zetkin, already by this time an iconic figure for many on the German left. During 1923 Helene Overlach was sent to meet Zetkin at Hamm railway station, a short distance to the north-east of Essen. The entire region was under French military occupation at the time. Evidently the military authorities somehow found out about the presence of two high level German communists at the station. Klara Zetkin and Helene Overlach were both arrested by a French soldier and detained for several hours. It was an unusual first meeting.

In 1925 Overlach became deputy chair ("Zweite Vorsitzende") of the newly launched national "Rote Frauen und Mädchenbund" (loosely, "Red Women's and Girls' Fighter Alliance"), the belatedly created female counterpart of a communist paramilitary organisation formed (for men) a year earlier. The organisation's chairwoman was the same Klara Zetkin whom Overlach had met at Hamm railway station two years earlier. Several sources stress that Overlach was the RFMB's "de facto" leader, while Zetkin's role was strictly nominal. (Zetkin was semi-retired by this time, spending much of her time in Moscow and, according to at least one source, "infirm".)

The appointment represented a major party promotion. Overlach's selection was almost certainly connected with her unfailing support for her party comrade Ernst Thälmann, whose own star was also in the ascendancy: supported by Party General Secretary Stalin, Thälmann took over as party leader in Germany later that same year. Overlach's progression from party official to the lower echelons of the German party leadership team will also have benefitted from her having impressed Klara Zetkin, who lived during this time in Moscow and enjoyed cordial relations with the Soviet party leadership.

At the Party Congress in 1927 and again in 1929 Helene Overlach was elected to membership of the powerful Party Central Committee. In 1928 she took charge of the Central Committee "Women's Department" ("...die Leitung der Frauenabteilung im Apparat des ZK"), a position in which she served until 1931 (when she left Germany to undertake a period of study in Moscow). In 1929 she was listed as a candidate for membership of the party politburo, which under a conventional Leninist party structure would have represented a further major promotion. However, in the Communist Party of Germany during the 1920s and 1930s the politburo remains a somewhat shadowy body: on the one hand there is no report in sources accessed of Overlach having made the final step from candidature to membership of it. On the other hand, there is at least one reference to her having resigned from the Politburo in 1932.

=== Reichstag ===
In May 1928 Helene Overlach stood successfully for election to the German national parliament ("Reichstag"): she represented Electoral District 22 (Düsseldorf East). For Communist members, including Helene Overlach, Reichstag membership came with membership of the Bund der Freunde der Sowjetunion ("Association of Friends of the Soviet Union" / BdFSU)), which had been set up on 4 November 1928 in the context of Party Leader Thälmann's strategy of moving closer to the Soviet Communist Party (in the process further isolating the Communist Party from potential political allies in Germany).

Overlach remained a member of the Reichstag from May 1928, through three more general elections, until March 1933, despite being out of the country for much of the time. The Great Depression as an aftermath of the Wall Street crash was a period of high unemployment and intensifying political polarisation in Germany: Overlach was badly injured in a street demonstration in 1930. After this there are no further references in sources accessed to the RFMB of which she had been deputy chair, and she probably stepped back from her political work while she recovered. The birth of her daughter Hanna around this time also provides context for her (temporary) disappearance from the political scene. Between Autumn/Fall 1931 and the middle of 1932 she undertook (political) education with the "Comintern" in Moscow.

During her time in Moscow Overlach was invited, on returning west, to undertake research into the extent and nature of party work undertaken by women in France and England. According to one source, while carrying out this instruction she met several western communist leaders including Maurice Thorez and Harry Pollitt. Meanwhile, the Reichstag was still more polarised and, after the elections of 1932, deadlocked. Between them the National Socialist Party and Communist Party controlled more than 50% of the votes, but the democratic parties were fragmented there was no question, of the anti-democratic parties governing in coalition either with one another or with some broad coalition of democratic parties or with each other. During 1932/33 Overlach's political and organisational skill were increasingly diverted to her work with "Internationale Arbeiter-Hilfe" (loosely, "Workers' International Relief" / IAH), a Moscow sponsored welfare organisation. She was also actively engaged, as "women's leader" ("...als Frauenleiterin"), with the "Revolutionäre Gewerkschafts Opposition" (literally "Revolutionary Trades Union Opposition" / RGO), another communist backed political movement operating to extend party support and control among German workers. In her Rhineland political base she was also involved with the German branch of the "Rote Hilfe" ("Red Aid ") organisation which operated, with party backing across the overlapping frontiers between workers' welfare and politics.

=== Hitler years ===
In January 1933, exploiting the parliamentary deadlock, the National Socialists took power. They lost little time in transforming Germany into a one-party dictatorship. Communist Party membership or activity was banned and many high-profile communists fled abroad, mostly ending up in Paris or Moscow. Others were arrested in the wake of the Reichstag fire of February 1933 which the new government blamed with implausible immediacy on "communists". There were some, however, who remained in Germany and at this stage retained their liberty, while continuing to undertake their political activities "underground". Although her name is included on an "arrest list" dated 28 February 1933, Helene Overlach was one of these. Pseudonyms under which she operated included "Frieda", "Klara" and "Frau Teschmer". In July 1933 she was still "working illegally" in the Ruhr region, notably in the industrially crucial city of Essen which had its own active underground Communist network, for "Rote Hilfe". According to another source she worked at this time - also "illegally" in the Ruhr region - as a "party instructor "for the RGO, later becoming regional leader ("Beszirksleiterin") for "Rote Hilfe". Along with her political activity, by the end of 1939 she had also successfully arranged for her daughter, by this time aged around 8, to be taken to Switzerland where the child was safely out of the way until 1942, when the Swiss authorities deported her back to Germany.

Helene Overlach's arrest took place in Essen on 23 December 1933. Eight months of investigative and preventive detention followed. In August 1934 she faced the District High Court in Hamm. Overlach was convicted under the usual charge, for non-Nazi political activists, of "preparing to commit High Treason" ("Vorbereitung zum Hochverrat") and sentenced to a three-year prison term which was still the maximum sentence available to the court for this charge at this stage. Time already spent in detention was off-set against the overall sentence in the usual way: between December 1933 and December 1936 she experienced the insides of the "castle penitentiary" at Ziegenhain, the "Gotteszell" detention centre (in a converted monastery) at Schwäbisch Gmünd and the women's prison at Aichach. It was at Aichach that she completed her sentence in December 1936. She now, according to at least one source, told the authorities that she remained a "convinced communist". Instead of being released she was taken into protective custody.

She was transferred, initially, to the concentration camp at Moringen. By 1938 she had been transferred again, this time to Lichtenburg. During the five years from 1933 until 1938 Helene Overlach survived her detention, but her health deteriorated significantly. There are suggestions that her release came in May or June 1938 only because the security services were convinced that she was too ill with heart disease to present a security threat. She supported herself by working as a typist between 1939 and 1941. She joined the government backed "Deutsche Arbeitsfront" ("... Labour Front") and "Nationalsozialistische Volkswohlfahrt" (loosely, "National Socialist People's Welfare" organisation). She was kept under close surveillance, and required to sign in at the local police station every three days. Between 1941 and 1944 she worked as a commercial school and technical school teacher.

On 20 July 1944 an assassination attempt on the leader came close to succeeding. Hitler survived, but the confidence of the ruling cabal was badly shaken. The government responded by digging out for retribution a list of several thousand people who had been politically active before 1933. High-profile members of the Communist Party and Social Democratic Party featured disproportionately. The "Aktion Gitter" list was badly out of date. Many of the communist party activists listed were dead. Many more were in Moscow. But Helene Overlach was alive in Berlin: the security services had no trouble locating her. Overnight, on 22/23 August 1944, an estimated 5,000 were arrested across Germany: most were promptly delivered to the closest concentration camp. Helene Overlach was one of the women taken to Ravensbrück concentration camp, a short distance to the north of Berlin.

=== Ravensbrück ===
The camp, by this stage, was desperately overcrowded: Typhus was rife. Helene Overlach was still not physically robust, and her health now deteriorated alarmingly. The slaughter of war had left Germany particularly short of able-bodied workers, with the result that more and more of the daily administrative work in the concentration camps was undertaken by selected inmates. Early in 1945, with Overlach appearing unlikely to survive, comrade inmates arranged for Helene Overlach and one other German communist to be included in a batch of Polish prisoners being sent to Sweden (which was neutral in the war) for release, under an arrangement that appears to have been connected with the "White Buses" scheme recently negotiated by the Swedish Red Cross. Her comrades also found a way to arrange a false name and the identity papers necessary for Overlach to remain undetected among the Polish women. Although there was no longer any doubt that the end of the war was imminent, as the buses transporting the women left Ravensbrück on 25 April 1945, fighting around Berlin was still intense. They nevertheless arrived in Malmö on 1 May 1945. The batch of inmates for release that included Overlach and her comrade had been transported not by bus but by train: when the Polish women noticed that there were two Germans concealed among them, they wanted to throw "the fascists" off, but they were somehow dissuaded.

The immediate aftermath of war was a chaotic time, especially in what remained of Germany: normally reliable sources differ significantly about Helene Overlach's stay in Sweden. One states that following her arrival in southern Sweden she was interned until July 1945: she then, in August 1945, returned to Berlin. Elsewhere it is recorded that in of before June 1945 she had settled in Västerås, a manufacturing city a short distance to the west of Stockholm: she remained in Sweden for nearly a year. It seems most likely, that having in most respects recovered her health, she returned to Berlin in April 1946, and was again reunited with her daughter Hanna, by now aged not quite fifteen.

=== Soviet occupation zone / German Democratic Republic ===
While the eastern third of pre-war Germany had now become part of Poland, the western two thirds were placed under military occupation, divided into four different occupation zones. The Ruhr region in which Overlach had been based during the 1930s was taken under British control. The eastern part of Berlin to which Overlach now returned was now, for most purposes, administered as part of the Soviet occupation zone. Overlach worked in what later became known as East Berlin in a succession of senior positions in education administration, early on becoming head of the section dealing with girls' vocational education. Directly after the war Berlin was not formally divided administratively: most of the physical divisions which would later divide the city were only set in place, progressively, during the 1950s. The city administration ("Magistrat") that operated until 1948 appointed Overlach as "Hauptreferentin" covering "Greater Berlin", making her responsible for commercial education in Berlin's business-oriented girls' schools ("...gewerblichen Mädchenberufsschule"). In 1950 she accepted a university-level job at the Pedagogical Academy as professor of business teacher training. Between 1952 and 1954 she headed the Institute for Training Teachers in Vocational Subjects ("Institut für Berufsschullehrerausbildung").

In October 1949 the Soviet occupation zone was relaunched as the Soviet sponsored German Democratic Republic (East Germany). Her high political profile before 1933 along with the quantity and quality of state honours that she received in later life have led commentators to question why she never returned to the political mainstream in East Germany. The increasingly precarious state of her health may provide a partial explanation. But it also became clear, over time, that the group of 30 men who flew into Berlin from Moscow at the end of April 1945 under the leadership of Walter Ulbricht had arrived with their own meticulously prepared nation building programme. There was little space in the Ulbricht Plan for comrades who had not shared Ulbricht's Moscow exile. During the 1950s those few political figures who rose to prominence in the party central leadership team, such as Paul Merker, who had survived the war years somewhere other than the Soviet Union, found themselves more than averagely likely to fall victim to the leader's permanent mistrustfulness. Helene Overlach had not been to Moscow since 1932. Simply by having spent the Hitler years in Germany and then surviving the experience, she risked becoming an object of suspicion among politically ambitious comrades taking their lead from Ulbricht.

At the end of 1954 Helene Overlach, now aged 60, was driven by serious heart disease to retire from her professional roles. She died in East Berlin on 7 August 1983.

== Awards and honours (selection) ==
- 1955 Clara Zetkin Medal
- 1955 Patriotic Order of Merit in silver
- 1964 Patriotic Order of Merit in gold
- 1969 Patriotic Order of Merit, gold clasp
- 1974 Order of Karl Marx
