= Roter Frontkämpferbund =

German far-left paramilitary organization

- Logo
- Other name: Rotfrontkämpferbund
- Leaders: Ernst Thälmann; Willy Leow
- Dates active: July 1924–May 14, 1929
- Country: Germany
- Allegiance: Communist Party of Germany
- Group: Rote Jungfront
- Newspaper: Rote Front
- Ideology: Communism; Luxemburgism (1919–1928); Marxism–Leninism (from 1928)
- Political position: Far-left
- Status: Dissolved
- Size: 130,000 (1929 est.)

The Roter Frontkämpferbund (German: [ˈʁoːtɐ ˈfʁɔntˌkɛmpfɐbʊnt], translated as "Alliance of Red Front-Fighters" or "Red Front Fighters' League"), usually called the Rotfrontkämpferbund (RFB), was a legally registered far-left paramilitary organization affiliated with the Communist Party of Germany (KPD) during the Weimar Republic. The RFB was banned in 1929 after violent clashes during illegal May Day demonstrations in Berlin, after which it mostly ceased operating, although small scale Underground Activities continued.

The first local branches of the RFB were established in July 1924. The group's inaugural nationwide meeting was held in February 1925 in Berlin, where Ernst Thälmann was elected to lead the federal committee. Die Rote Front ('The Red Front') was the newspaper of the RFB. The greeting of "Rot Front!" ('Red Front!') while giving a clenched fist salute gave rise to the expression Rotfront, often used among friends and foes to refer to the organization instead of its full title. The clenched fist "protecting the friend, fighting off the enemy" (German: "schützend den Freund, abwehrend den Feind") was the symbol of the RFB, used on all its insignia, and its registered trademark from 1 March 1926. In May 1926, during a flag parade, activists used the salute and banner display as a sign of rallying to the movement and international solidarity; the event included the ceremonial presentation of a flag donated by Moscow trade-unions.

== History ==
=== Formation ===
The KPD depended on the Proletarian Hundreds (German: Proletarische Hundertschaften) to protect their meetings and demonstrations, but this organization was banned in 1923. This left the KPD's political activities exposed to attacks from the police and right-wing paramilitary organizations such as the nationalist Der Stahlhelm and the Nazi Sturmabteilung (SA). The ninth national conference of the KPD in April 1924 decided to form a new defense organization. It was given the name Roter Frontkämpfer-Bund, with the intent of attracting non-Communist workers as well.

Then in Halle on 11 May 1924, police fired on a demonstration; eight workers were killed and 16 seriously wounded. The KPD announced the formation of the RFB to all its local branches, and soon the first local RFB groups were formed. Most of these first RFB units were located in industrial cities, seaports, and other traditional strongholds of the working class.

=== Development ===
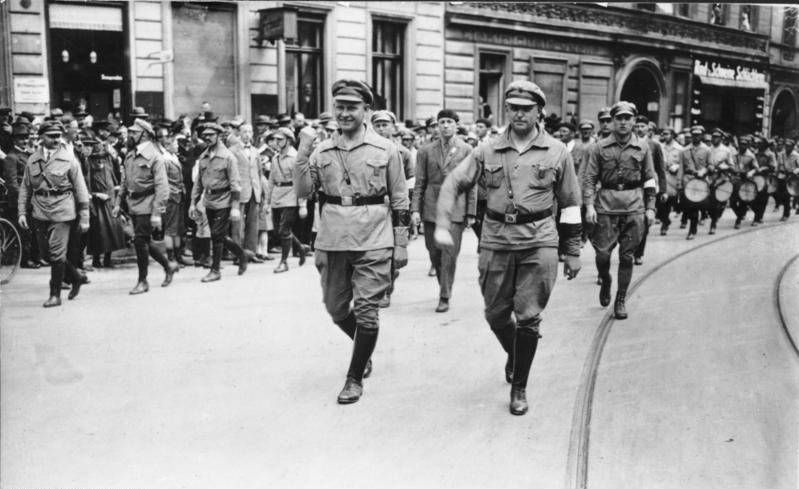
RFB leaders Ernst Thälmann (left) and Willy Leow (right) in Berlin, June 1927

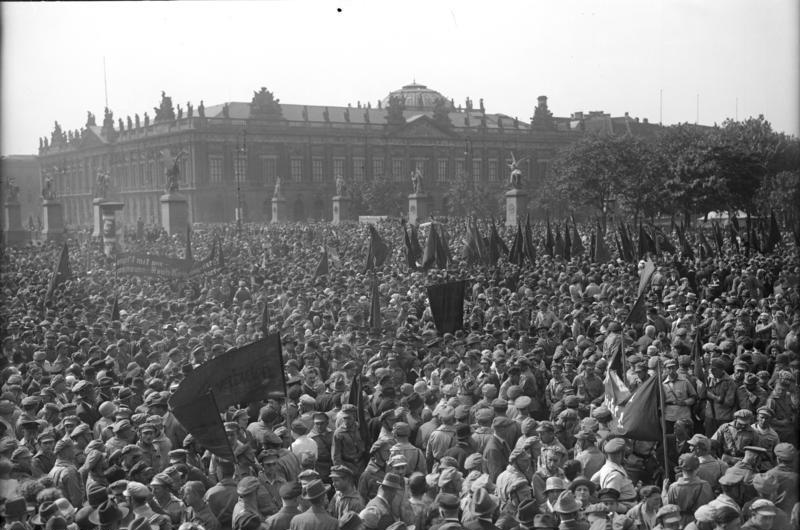
Assembly of the Roter Frontkämpferbund in Lustgarten, May 1928

Over the years the RFB engaged more and more in violent street fights with the police, the SA, and other political rivals. In 1929, the RFB participated in bloody protests after International Workers' Day was banned in Berlin during what became known as Blutmai (Bloody May). More than 30 innocents were shot and killed by the police. The RFB was banned and all its assets confiscated by the government. At the time of the ban, the RFB had close to 130,000 members. Some of them continued their activities illegally or in local successor organizations such as the Kampfbund gegen den Faschismus (English: Fighting-Alliance Against Fascism), but these never reached the scale the RFB had before the ban. Others retired from the political scene.

=== Under the Third Reich ===
After the Nazi takeover in 1933, former RFB members were among the first arrested and incarcerated in Nazi concentration camps. The Nazis sought revenge on their former rivals and many of the RFB died in the Nazi prisons.

Of those who survived or avoided arrest, many followed the call of the Second Spanish Republic during the Spanish Civil War (1936–39). They joined the Centuria Thälmann of the International Brigades to fight against the Nationalist rebels. During World War II former Red Front fighters fought in the Soviet Red Army against Nazi Germany.

=== After the war ===
After World War II, former RFB members such as Erich Honecker and Erich Mielke were actively involved in the creation of the first police and military units of the German Democratic Republic (GDR; East Germany). The Arbeiterkampfgruppen (English: Combat Groups of the Working Class) and the Nationale Volksarmee (English: National People's Army) claimed to carry on the traditions of the RFB, while the Federal Republic of Germany in West Germany enforced the ban of 1929 and prosecuted former Red Front fighters who admitted to their RFB activities.

== Membership and organisation ==
=== Members ===
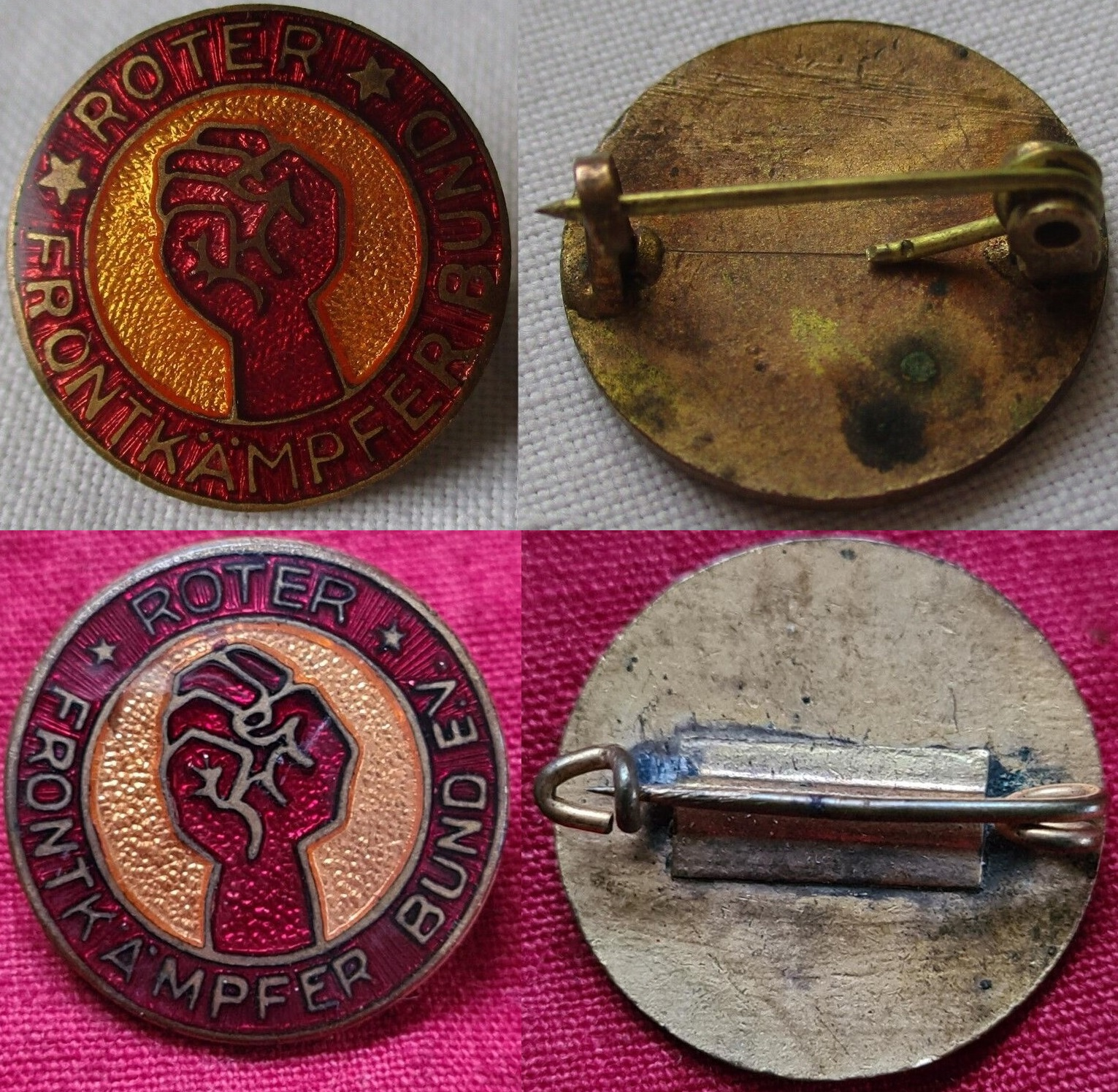
RFB membership badges of the 1924 pattern (above) and of the 1926 pattern (below)

While many RFB groups were led by KPD members, most Red Front fighters were not party members. There exists claims of Social Democrats and Zentrum Members in the RFB, though there is no real proof to back that claim outside of KPD-Successor organisations.

The only Person known by name which was both SPD and RFB member was Hermann Schulze, although he had already left the SPD before becoming a RFB member.

98% of the RFB belonged to the working class and only 1% had received a higher education. A large part of the RFB were veterans of World War I and some had been actively involved in the November Revolution of 1918.

The number of members grew constantly, peaking with close to 130,000 members at the time of the ban in 1929.

- April 1925: 40,450 members in 558 local groups (49% non-party members)
- June 1925: 51,630 members in 826 local groups (53% non-party members)
- February 1926: 68,392 members in 1,120 local groups (55% non-party members)

At the time of the ban in 1929, only 30% of the RFB were actually KPD members. 70% were non-party or members of other parties.

=== Sections ===
For its younger members (between the ages of 16 and 21), the RFB formed the Roter Jungsturm (English: Red Young Storm). It was renamed Rote Jungfront (RJ) (English: Red Young Front) in 1925 to avoid similarities with the Nazi Jungsturm and to underline their goal of a united front. 40% of local RFB groups had a section of the RJ.

Sailors of the Imperial German Navy had a major role in the November Revolution of 1918. To commemorate this, in May 1925 the RFB founded the Rote Marine (RM) (English: Red Navy) with sections in all major port cities. The RM was also considered an elite unit.

From 1925 the female members were organized in the Roter Frauen und Mädchen Bund (RFMB) (English: Alliance of Red Women and Girls). The federal leaders were Clara Zetkin and Helene Overlach. At the 1929 ban, the RFMB had about 4,000 members.

=== Organizational structure ===
RFB Pirna

The RFB's structure was a bottom to top organization. The local groups elected the regional leadership and the regional leaders elected the federal committee.

- 1. Bundesführung (English: Federal Committee)
- 2. Gauführung (English: Regional Committee)
- 3. Ortsgruppe (X Abteilungen, English: Local Group (with several battalions, depending on the member strength of the local group))

3.1. Abteilung (X Kameradschaften, English: Battalion made up of X "Comradeships")
3.2. Kameradschaft (3 Züge, c. 100 men, English: Comradeship made up of 3 Platoons, approx. 100 men)
3.3. Zug (4 Gruppen, c. 35 men + 1 Zugführer, English: Platoon made up of 4 Groups, approx. 35 men plus 1 platoon leader)
3.4. Gruppe (8 men + 1 Gruppenführer, English: Group made up of 8 men plus 1 group leader)

=== Bundesführung ===
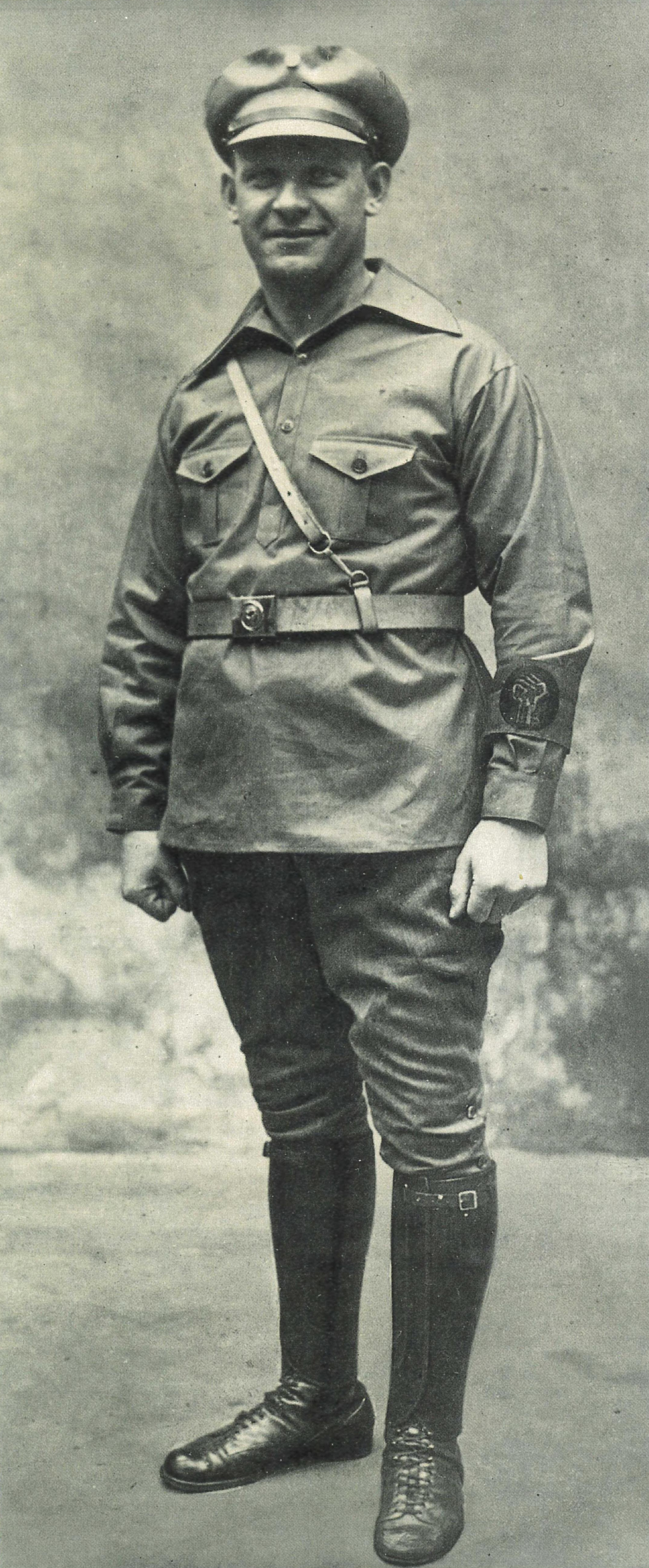
Ernst Thälmann in RFB uniform

The Bundesführung or "Federal Committee" included:

- Ernst Thälmann (1. Federal Leader)
- Willy Leow (2. Federal Leader, Organizational and Technical Manager)
- Alfred Oelßner (Treasurer)
- Ernst Schneller
- Hans Jendretzky
- Fritz Selbmann
- Werner Jurr
- Albert Schreiner (Chief Editor Rote Front)
- Curt Steinbrecher

=== RFB-Gaue ===
The RFB-Gaue or Regional sections of the RFB included:

- Wasserkante
- Thüringen (Thuringia)
- Berlin-Brandenburg
- Magdeburg-Anhalt
- Halle-Merseburg
- Niedersachsen (Lower Saxony)
- Nordwest (Northwest)
- Ruhrgebiet (Ruhr district)
- Niederrhein (Lower Rhine)
- Mittelrhein (Middle Rhine)
- Hessen-Waldeck (Hesse-Waldeck)
- Hessen-Frankfurt (Hesse-Frankfurt)
- Saargebiet (Saar district)
- Baden
- Württemberg
- Pommern (Pomerania)
- Ostpreußen (East Prussia)
- Oberschlesien (Upper Silesia)
- Schlesien (Silesia)
- Erzgebirge-Vogtland
- Mecklenburg
- Ostsachsen (East Saxony)
- Westsachsen (West Saxony)
- Nord-Bayern (North Bavaria)
- Süd-Bayern (South Bavaria)

Plans to form local RFB groups in the cities of Nuremberg and Munich in 1925 were banned by the state of Bavaria. Until 1928 there were no official RFB groups in Bavaria. Only after the end of the ban of the local group Dortmund by the Reichsgericht on April 2, 1928, RFB groups could at least formally be founded also in Bavaria. But there was a constant threat of a ban on events, especially since Bavaria had been pressing for a nationwide ban of RFB since the decision of the Reichsgericht. On April 13, 1928, after the formation of the Bund on Reich level, Jakob Boulanger founded an RFB-Gau Nordbayern with subsequent local groups in Nuremberg, Würzburg, Aschaffenburg, Sulzbach, Bamberg, Hof and Bayreuth. In the summer of 1928, 14 local groups with 800 members, 350 of them in Nuremberg were registered.

== Activities ==
=== "Protection and Security" ===
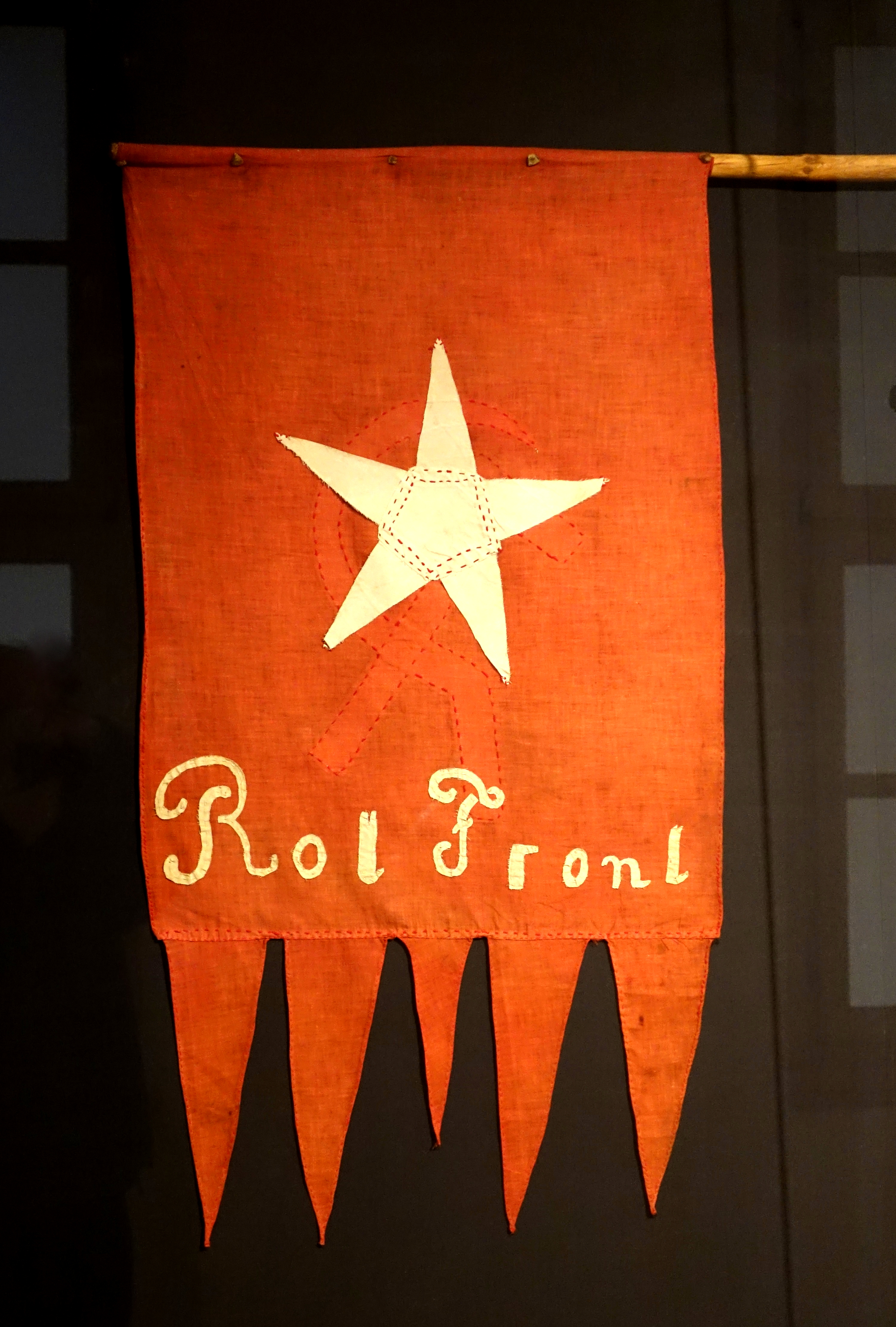
Roter Frontkämpferbund standard, c. 1925

A large part of the RFB activities were directed at supporting the political propaganda work of the KPD, the Rote Hilfe (English: Red Help), and other proletarian organizations such as workers unions. In most cases they provided security services for the various events but also participated in active agitation. The RFB engaged in acts of violence against the police which tried to enforce various bans and their political rivals who tried to illegally disrupt their rallies.

Numerous events ended in mass brawls between the police and the RFB, leaving injured on both sides and in some cases dead.

Arrested RFB members could depend on the Rote Hilfe for legal support and also, in case of sentencing to prison, for financial support of their families while they were unable to work.

Until the RFB was banned, its rivalry with the other paramilitarys such as the Nazi SA, the conservative Stahlhelm, and the republican Reichsbanner grew constantly and violence intensified. Since the strategy of the SA was to fight and provoke, violent encounters between the RFB and SA soon became a part of everyday life. The SA achieved some strength in working-class districts, although these areas supported either the SPD or the KPD but not the "brown" Nazi Party the SA stood for.

The RFB members also fought to stop landlords from evicting tenants.

=== "Social Justice and Peace" ===
Its statutes defined the RFB as anti-militarist, and therefore it opposed German re-armament. For instance, the RFB along other organizations like the SPD protested against the spending of billions of Reichsmarks on "pocket battleships", and demanded the money go instead to relieve poverty.

Most RFB public actions were directed against the Weimar government and its involvement with powerful German industrialists. The RFB demanded the preservation of peace and denounced perceived plans for a new war. Most of the RFB also supported the KPD's program of Soviet-style Communism. The RFB therefore was soon considered an "enemy of the state", leading to several temporary bans of its announced parades and meetings.

Other RFB events included propaganda marches in rural areas to get poor farmers and agricultural workers to join their cause.

== See also ==
- Roter Soldatenbund
- Proletarische Hundertschaften
- Kampfbund gegen den Faschismus
- Antimilitärischer Apparat
- Parteiselbstschutz
- Deutsche Tscheka
- Antifaschistische Aktion
