= Rosa Thälmann =

German communist (1890–1962)

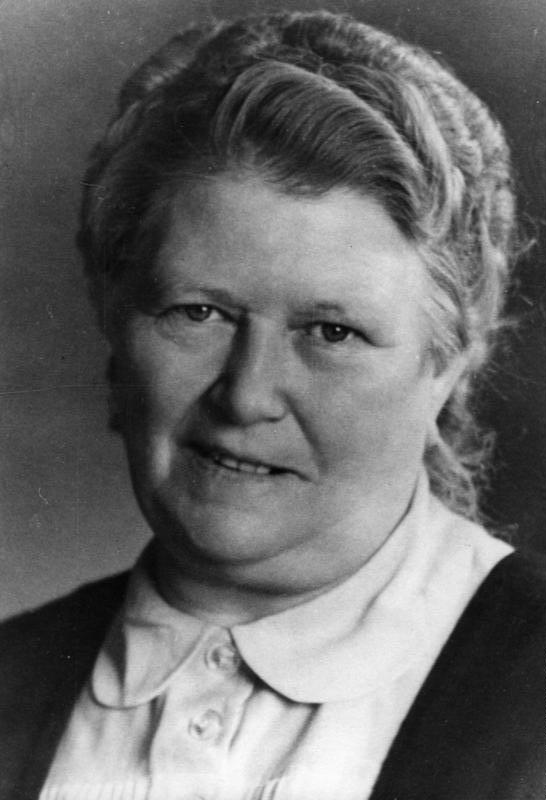
- Thälmann in 1951
- Born: Rosa Koch; 27 March 1890; Bargfeld-Stegen, Germany
- Died: 21 September 1962 (aged 72); Berlin, Germany
- Resting place: Gedenkstätte der Sozialisten
- Citizenship: German Democratic Republic
- Political party: Communist Party of Germany; Socialist Unity Party of Germany
- Spouse: Ernst Thälmann (m. 1915; died 1944)

Rosa Thälmann, née Rosa Koch (27 March 1890 – 21 September 1962), was a German communist politician and the wife of Ernst Thälmann, who was the leader of the Communist Party of Germany (KPD) from 1925 to 1933. They had a daughter named Irma in 1919. Thälmann's husband was arrested by the Nazis in 1933 and held in solitary confinement in Buchenwald concentration camp. In 1944, Thälmann and her daughter were arrested and taken to Ravensbrück concentration camp. Irma was later transferred to the Neubrandenburg subcamp. While they were imprisoned, Ernst Thälmann was murdered by the Nazis in August 1944. In 1945, Thälmann was subjected to a death march but was able to escape, and her daughter was liberated by the Red Army. In 1953, Thälmann was awarded the Order of Karl Marx. She also served as a deputy for the Socialist Unity Party of Germany (SED) in the Volkskammer.
