= Willy Leow =

German politician (1887–1937)

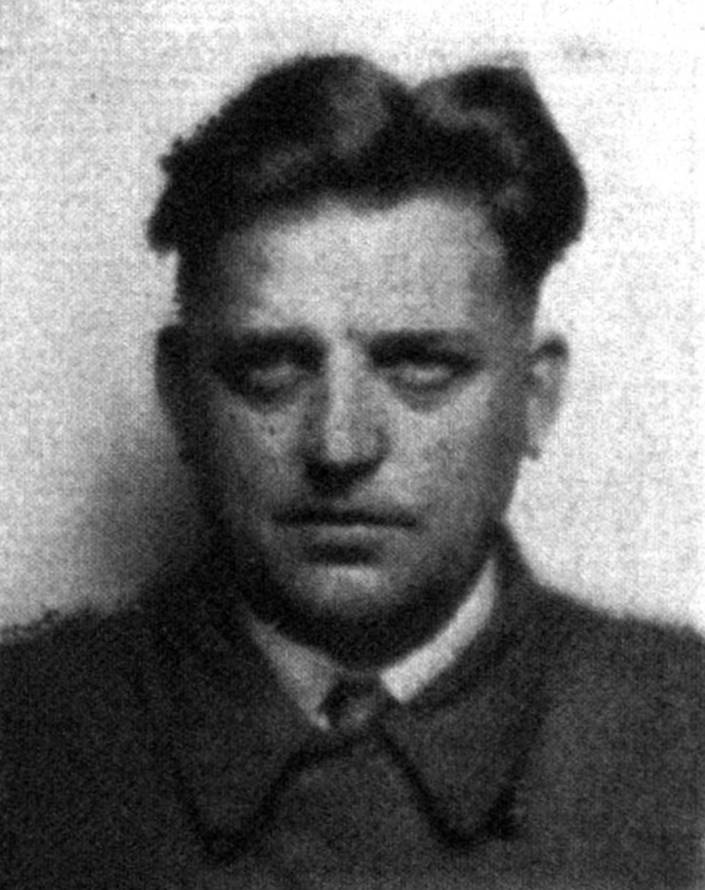
- Leow c. 1930

Second Chairman of the Roter Frontkämpferbund
- In office 1 February 1925 – 14 May 1929
- Chairman: Ernst Thälmann
- Preceded by: Position established
- Succeeded by: Position abolished

Member of the Reichstag for East Prussia
- In office 13 June 1928 – 28 February 1933
- Preceded by: Multi-member district
- Succeeded by: Constituency abolished

Personal details
- Born: 25 January 1887 Brandenburg an der Havel, Province of Brandenburg, Kingdom of Prussia, German Empire
- Died: 3 October 1937 (aged 50) Soviet Union
- Cause of death: Firing squad
- Party: SPD (1904–1916); USPD (1917–1919); KPD (after 1919)
- Occupation: Woodworker; Politician; Activist
- Central institution membership: 1929–1935: Full member, KPD Central Committee; 1927–1929: Candidate member, KPD Central Committee

Willy Leow (25 January 1887 – 3 October 1937) was a German communist politician and activist. He was the de facto leader of the Roter Frontkämpferbund, the paramilitary of the Communist Party of Germany, from 1925 to 1929. He also served in the Reichstag from 1928 to 1933.

== Life ==
Willy Leow attended elementary school in Brandenburg an der Havel. He learned carpentry and was taught at the Workers' Educational School in Berlin. In January 1904, Leow became a member of the German Wood Workers' Union. In the same year Leow joined the Social Democratic Party (SPD), which he belonged to until 1916. In 1917, Leow participated in the foundation of the Spartacus League and briefly belonged to the Independent Social Democratic Party of Germany. He was arrested in April 1918 along with Leo Jogiches, Willi Budich, and others, and was not freed until the German Revolution that November. He became a founding member of the Communist Party of Germany (KPD) in 1919.

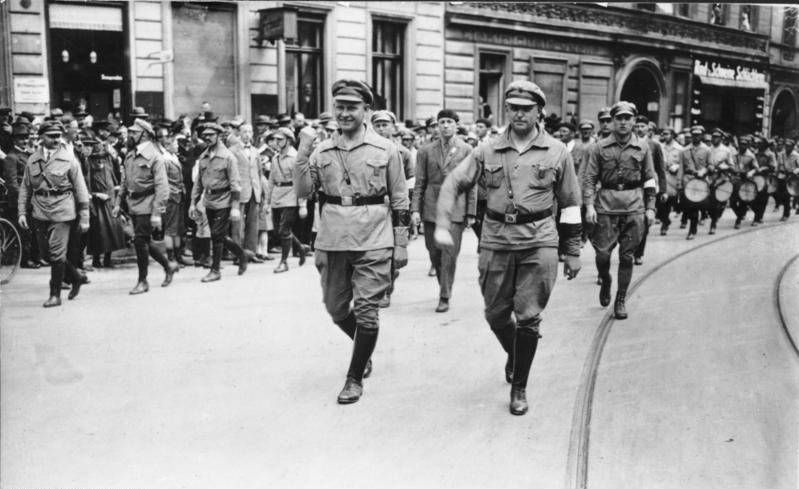
RFB leaders Ernst Thälmann (left) and Willy Leow (right) in Berlin, June 1927

In the early 1920s, Leow was secretary of the party's Berlin-Northwest district and subsequently doorman at the Karl-Liebknecht-Haus, the party headquarters. In February 1925, Leow was elected Second Chairman of the Roter Frontkämpferbund (RFB), a KPD paramilitary and defense organization. After Ernst Thälmann, the RFB's First Chairman, became leader of the KPD that September, Leow effectively took over as head of the RFB. He was often seen marching alongside Thälmann and other prominent KPD and RFB activists. In 1928, Leow was elected to the Reichstag, where he served until 1933.

After the Nazi seizure of power Leow fled abroad, living in the Soviet Union by 1935. He worked as an editor and head of the German state publishing house in the Volga German Autonomous Soviet Socialist Republic. In 1936, he was arrested during the Stalinist purges and sentenced to death on 3 October 1937 for "organizing a Trotskyist-terrorist group" by the Military Collegium of the Supreme Court of the Soviet Union. He was executed by firing squad.

== Legacy ==
In the German Democratic Republic, Leow was subjected to damnatio memoriae. Traces of his existence were systematically removed from published documents and photographic reproductions. Leow was airbrushed out of a widely reproduced photograph showing him alongside Ernst Thälmann during a RFB rally in the 1920s. The reason for this practice was that the arrest and execution of a German communist and refugee from fascism like Leow in the Soviet Union was incompatible with the GDR's historical narrative, and therefore he could not be mentioned in any publication.
