= Ernst Thälmann =

German communist politician (1886–1944)

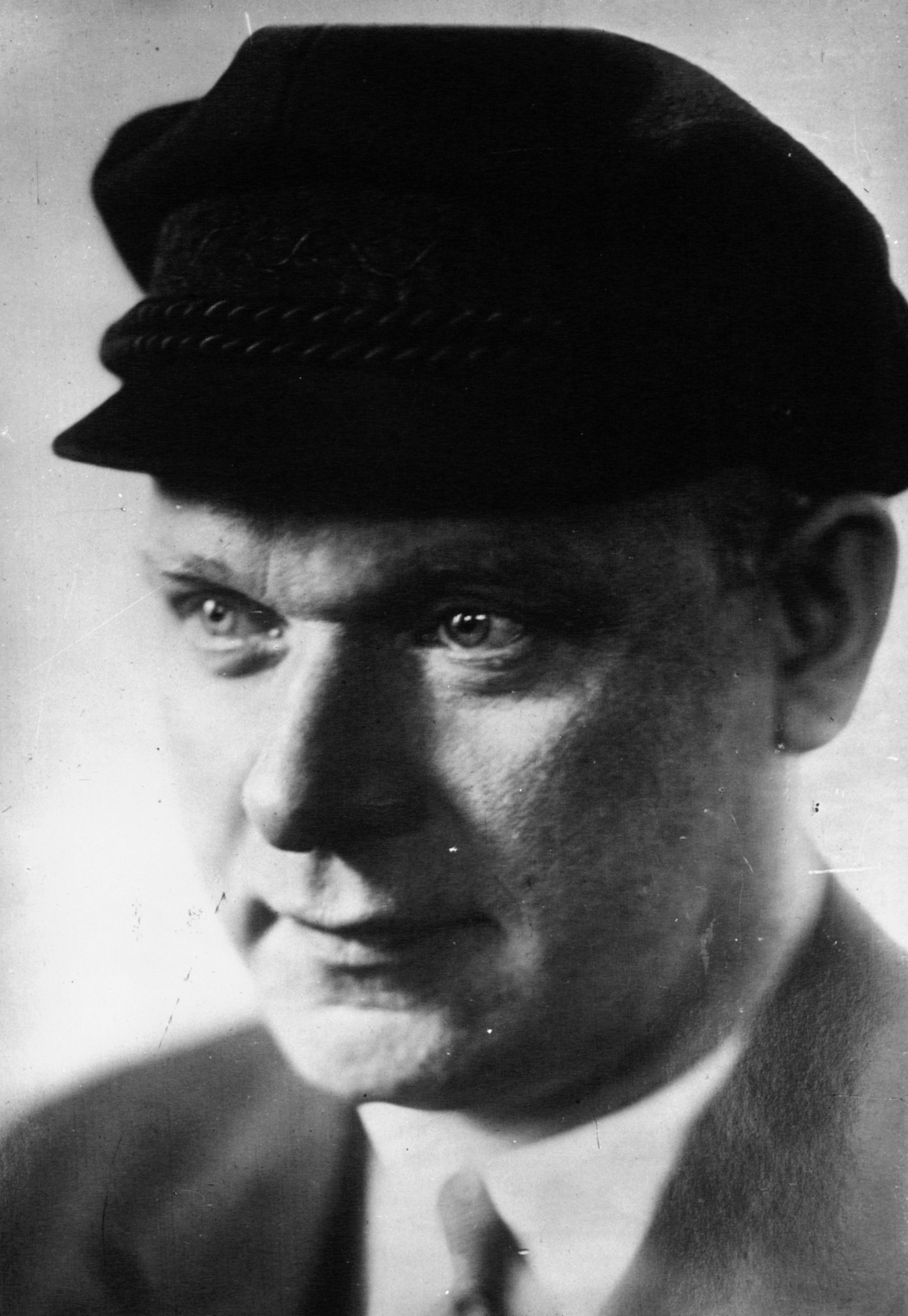
- Thälmann in 1932

Chairman of the Communist Party of Germany
- In office 1 September 1925 – 3 March 1933
- Preceded by: Ruth Fischer
- Succeeded by: John Schehr

Chairman of the Roter Frontkämpferbund
- In office 1 February 1925 – 14 May 1929
- Second Chairman: Willy Leow
- Preceded by: Position established
- Succeeded by: Position abolished

Member of the Reichstag for Hamburg
- In office 27 May 1924 – 28 February 1933
- Preceded by: Multi-member district
- Succeeded by: Constituency abolished

Personal details
- Born: 16 April 1886 Hamburg, Germany
- Died: 18 August 1944 (aged 58) Buchenwald concentration camp, Germany
- Party: KPD (1920–1944)
- Other political affiliations: USPD (1917–1920); SPD (1903–1917)
- Spouse: Rosa Koch (m. 1915)
- Children: Irma
- Occupation: Dockworker; Politician

Military service
- Allegiance: German Empire; Revolutionaries
- Years of service: 1915–1918; 1923
- Battles/wars: World War I; Western Front; Second Battle of Champagne; Battle of the Somme; Battle of Arras; Second Battle of the Aisne; Battle of Cambrai; Battle of Soissons; Hamburg Uprising
- Awards: Iron Cross Second Class; Hanseatic Cross; Wound Badge
- Central institution membership: 1924–1933: Full member, KPD Politburo; 1923–1939: Full member, KPD Central Committee (Note: Zentrale until 1925); 1920–1925: Member, KPD Central Commission; Other offices held: 1924–1925: Deputy Chairman, Communist Party of Germany; 1919–1933: Member, Hamburg Parliament

Ernst Johannes Fritz Thälmann (Note: Thälmann sometimes spelled Thaelmann) (German: [ɛʁnst ˈtɛːlman]; 16 April 1886 – 18 August 1944) was a German communist politician, revolutionary, and leader of the Communist Party of Germany (KPD) from 1925 to 1933.

A committed communist, Thälmann sought to overthrow the Weimar Republic, especially during the instability of its final years, and to replace it with a socialist state based on Marxism-Leninism. Under his leadership, the KPD became intimately associated with the government of the Soviet Union and the policies of Joseph Stalin. The KPD under Thälmann's leadership regarded the Social Democratic Party (SPD) as an adversary and the party adopted the position that the social democrats were "social fascists". Both the SPD and KPD were already previously split on many key issues, however, this new stance clarified it was impossible for the two parties to form a united front against the Nazi Party.

Thälmann was leader of the paramilitary Roter Frontkämpferbund. After the Nazi regime began, he was arrested by the Gestapo in 1933 and held in solitary confinement for eleven years. Stalin and Vyacheslav Molotov originally sought Thälmann's release; after the Molotov–Ribbentrop Pact, efforts to that end were abandoned, while Thälmann's party rival Walter Ulbricht ignored requests to plead on his behalf. Thälmann was shot dead on Adolf Hitler's personal order in Buchenwald concentration camp in 1944.

== Early life, family, and education ==
Thälmann was born in Hamburg on 16 April 1886, His parents, Johannes "Jan" Thälmann (11 April 1857, Weddern (Holstein) – 31 October 1933), a farmworker, and Mary-Magdalene (née Kohpeiss; 8 November 1857, Kirchwerder – 9 March 1927), married in 1884 in Hamburg. They had no party affiliation; in contrast to his father, his mother was deeply religious. After his birth, his parents took over a pub near the Port of Hamburg. On 4 April 1887, his sister Frieda was born (died 8 July 1967 in Hamburg). In March 1892, Thälmann's parents were convicted and sentenced to two years in prison because they had fenced stolen goods or had taken them for debt payment.

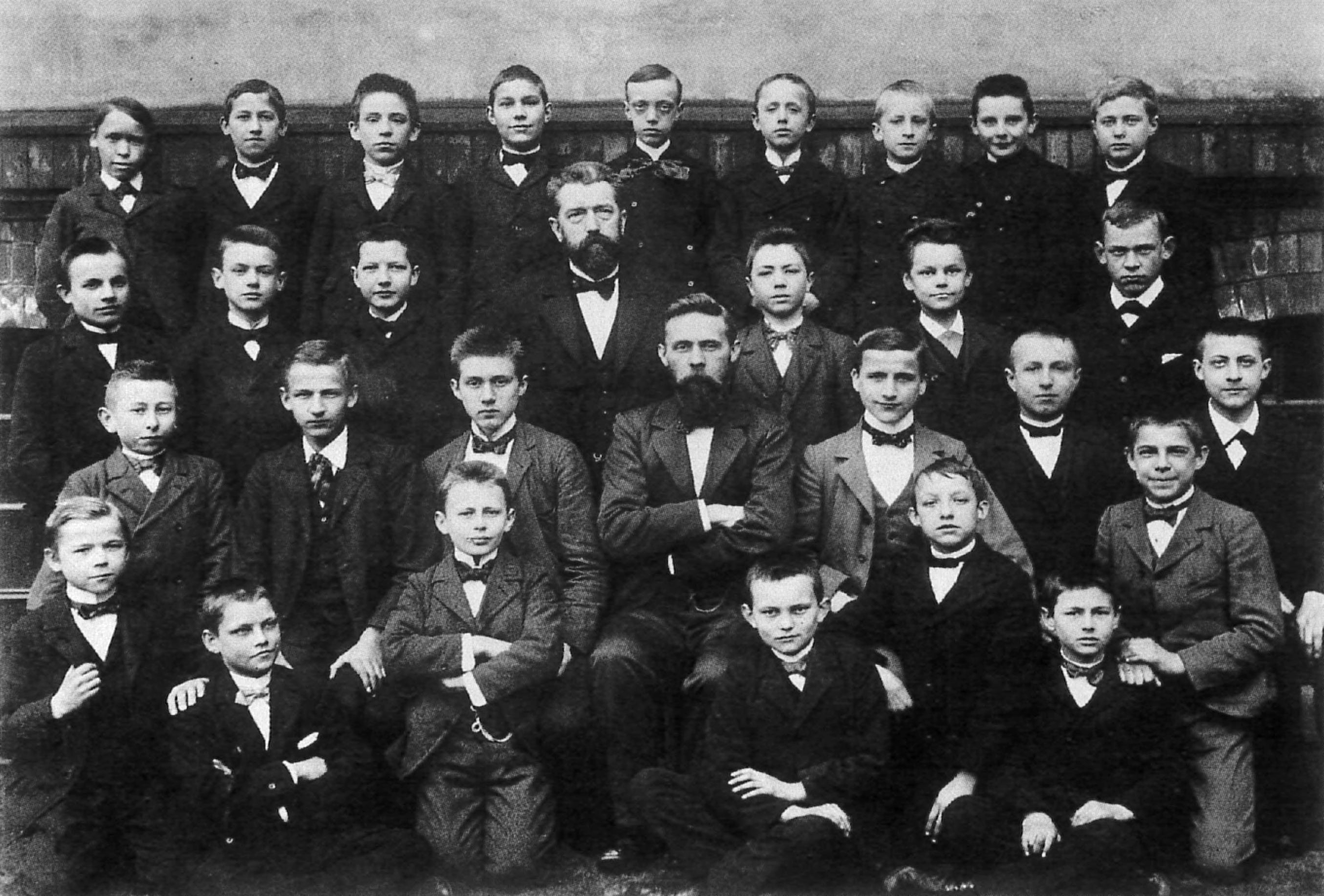
Thälmann (second row from the top, far right) at Volksschule c. 1900

Thälmann and his sister Frieda were placed in separate foster families. Thälmann's parents were released early, his mother in May, and his father in October 1893. His parents' offense was used 36 years later in the campaign against him. From 1893 to 1900, Thälmann attended elementary school. He later described history, natural history, folklore, mathematics, gymnastics, and sports as his favorite subjects; he did not like religion. In the mid-1890s, his parents opened a vegetable, coal and wagon shop in Eilbek, a suburb of Hamburg. The young Thälmann worked in the business after school and did his schoolwork in the morning before classes started. Despite this burden, Thälmann was a good student who enjoyed learning. He wanted to become a teacher or to learn a trade but his parents refused to lend him financial support. He had to continue working in his parents' business, causing much sorrow and conflict with his parents. As a result, he sought a job as an unskilled worker in the port. The ten-year-old Thälmann came in contact with the port workers on strike from November 1896 till February 1897 in the bitter labor dispute known as the Hamburg Docker's Strike 1896–1897.

== Leaving home, World War I, and desertion ==
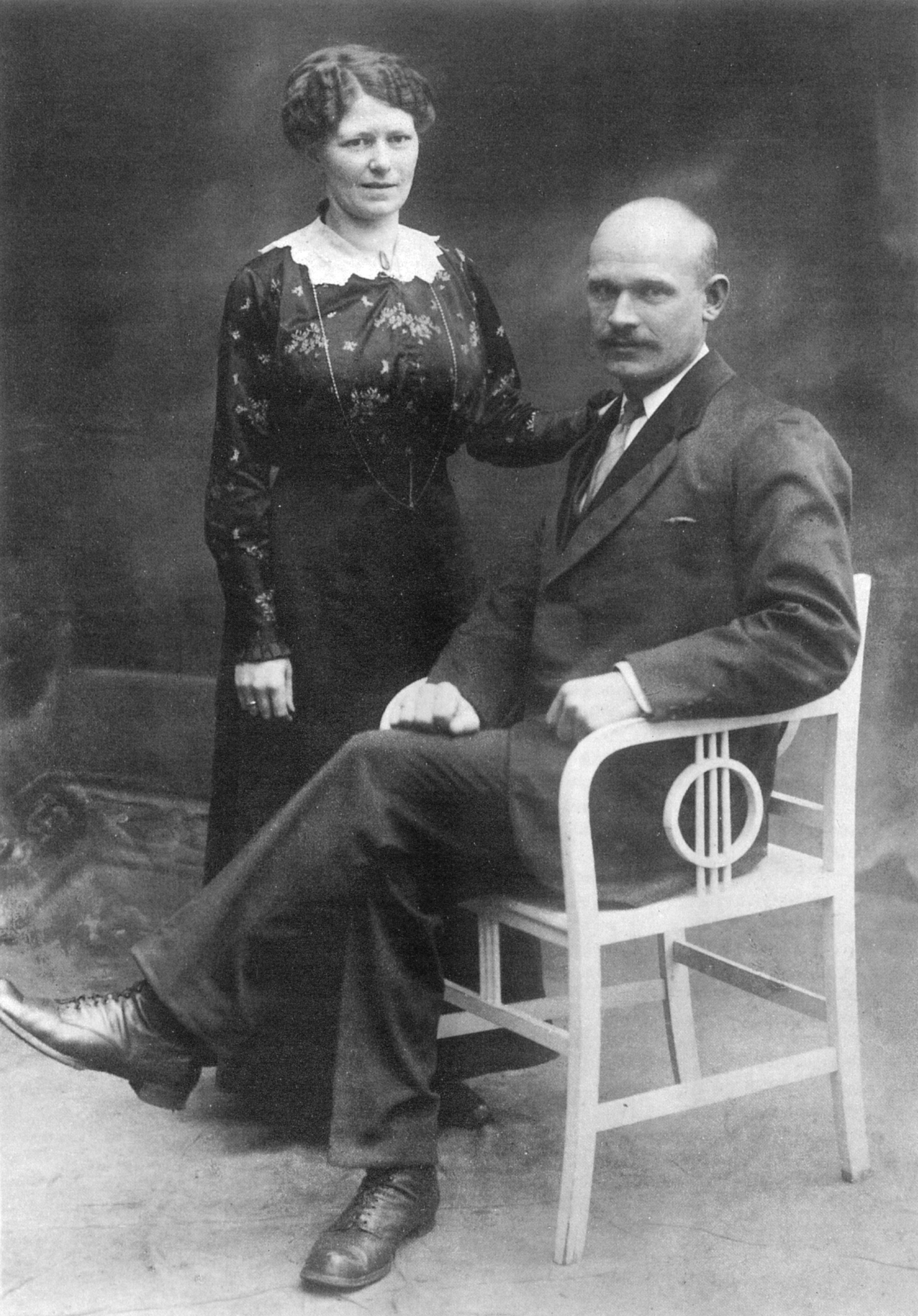
Thälmann and his wife Rosa, 1915

At the beginning of 1902, Thälmann left home. He first lived in an emergency shelter, later in a basement apartment, and in 1904 he was a fireman on the steam-powered freight ship AMERIKA, which also traveled to the United States. He became a Social Democratic Party (SPD) member in 1903. On 1 February 1904, at age 17, he joined the Central Union of Trade, Transport and Traffic Workers of Germany and ascended to the chairman of the Department Carters. In 1913, he supported a call of Rosa Luxemburg for a mass strike as a means of action of the SPD to enforce political demands. From 1913 to 1914, he worked for a laundry as a coachman. In January 1915, one day before he was called up for military service in World War I, Thälmann married Rosa Koch. He was posted to the artillery on the western front, where he stayed until the end of the war, taking part in the Battle of Champagne (1915–1916), the Battle of the Somme (1916), the Battle of Arras (1917), the Second Battle of the Aisne (1917), the Battle of Cambrai (1917), and the Battle of Soissons (1918). For his service, Thälmann received the Iron cross Second Class, the Hanseatic Cross and Wound Badge (twice).

Towards the end of 1917, Thälmann became a member of the Independent Social Democratic Party of Germany (USPD). In late October 1918, while on home leave from the front, Thälmann deserted together with four fellow soldiers. On 9 November 1918, he wrote in his diary on the Western Front that he "did a bunk from the Front with 4 comrades at 2 o'clock."

== Kommunistische Partei Deutschlands (KPD) ==
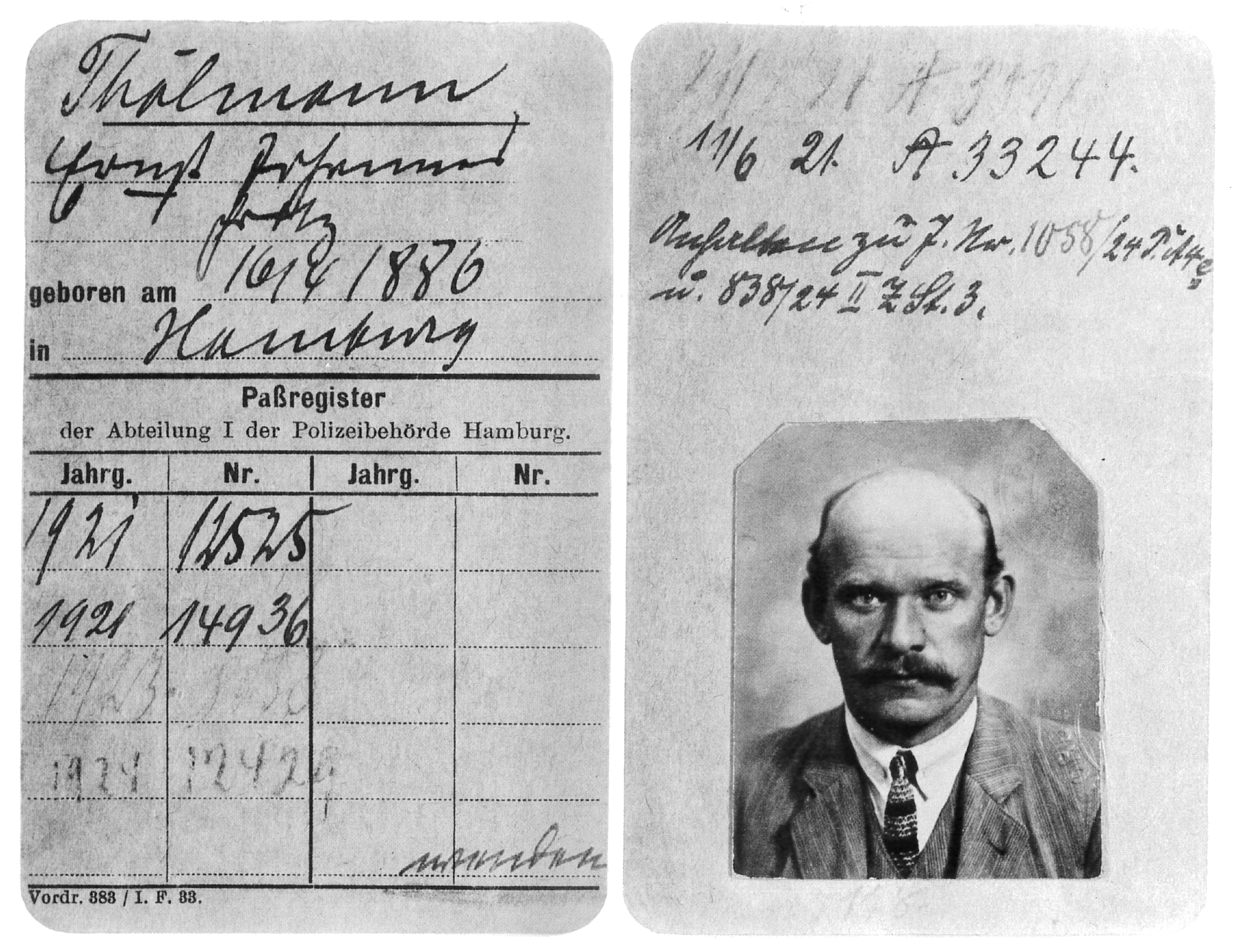
Thälmann's first foreign passport, 1921

After his desertion, Thälmann was active in the German Revolution of 1918–1919 in Hamburg that began on 29 October 1918. From March 1919, he was chairman of the USPD in Hamburg, a member of the Hamburg Parliament, and worked as a relief worker in the Hamburg city park before taking up a well-paying job at the employment office. There, he rose to the rank of Inspector. When the USPD split over the question whether to join the Communist International (Comintern), Thälmann sided with the pro-communist faction which merged with the KPD in November 1920, and in the following December he was elected to the KPD's Central Committee. In March 1921, he was fired from his job at the employment office due to his political activities. That summer Thälmann was a representative of the KPD to the 3rd Congress of the Comintern in Moscow and met Vladimir Lenin personally.

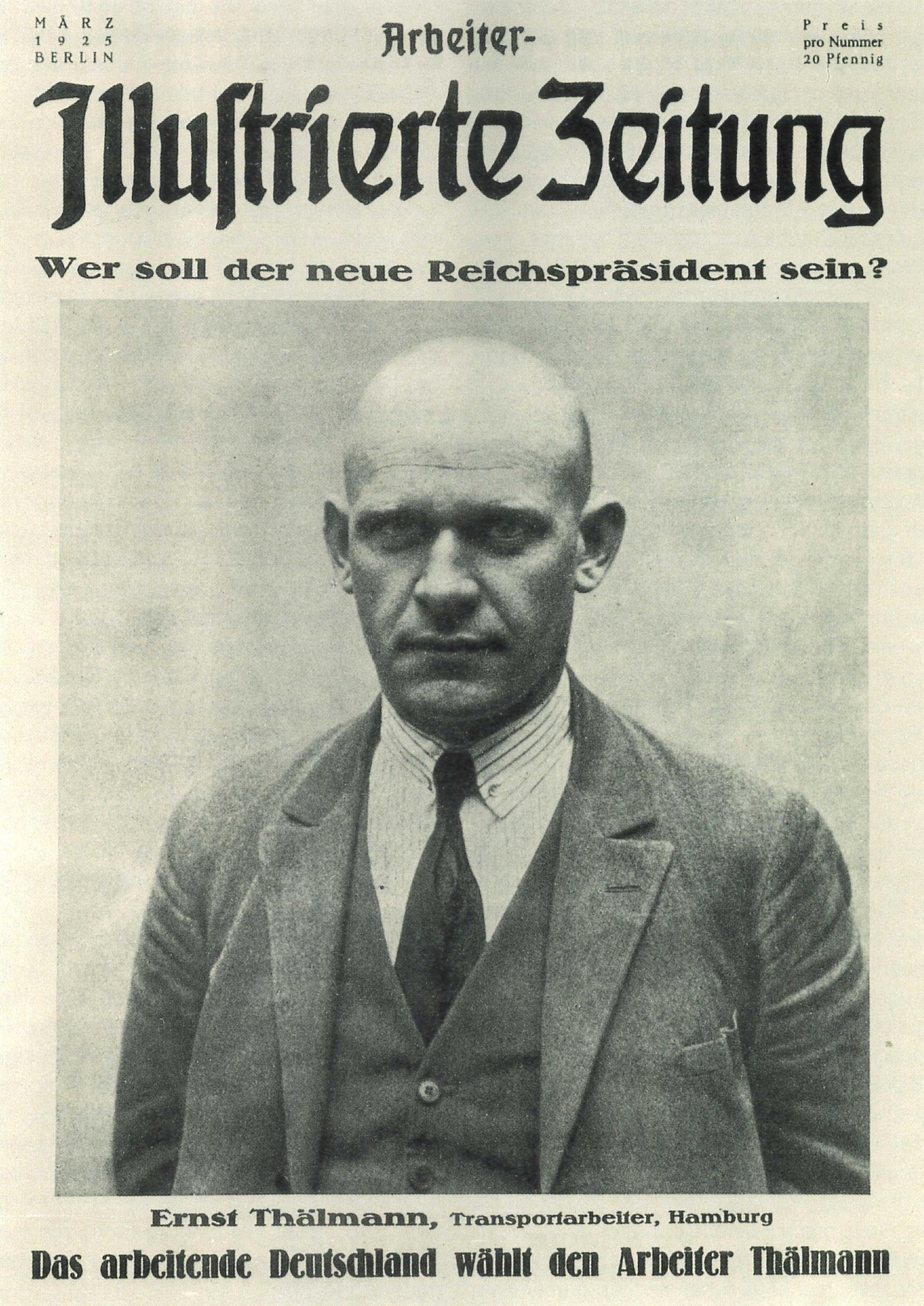
Thälmann on the cover of Arbeiter-Illustrierte-Zeitung, March 1925

In June 1922, terrorists from the ultranationalist group Organisation Consul threw a hand grenade into his ground floor flat; the assassination attempt failed and he survived. Thälmann helped to organise the Hamburg Uprising of October 1923; as this failed, Thälmann was forced to go in hiding. After Lenin's death in late January 1924, Thälmann visited Moscow and maintained a guard of honour at his bier. From February 1924, he was deputy chairman of the KPD and from May 1924 he was also a Reichstag member. At the 5th Congress of the Comintern in July 1924, he was elected to the Comintern executive committee and a short time later to its steering committee. In February 1925, he became chairman of the KPD's paramilitary organisation, the Roter Frontkämpferbund (RFB); this organisation was banned by the governing SPD in 1929 after the events of Blutmai ("Bloody May"). In September 1925, Thälmann became chairman of the KPD and thus a candidate for the German Presidency. Thälmann's candidacy in the second round of the presidential election split the centre-left vote, ensuring that the conservative Paul von Hindenburg defeated the Centre Party's Wilhelm Marx.

In October 1926, Thälmann supported the dockers' strike in his home town of Hamburg. He saw this as an act of solidarity with the British miners' strike which had started on 1 May, although that strike had been profitable for the Hamburg Docks as an alternative supplier of coal.

=== KPD vs. SPD ===
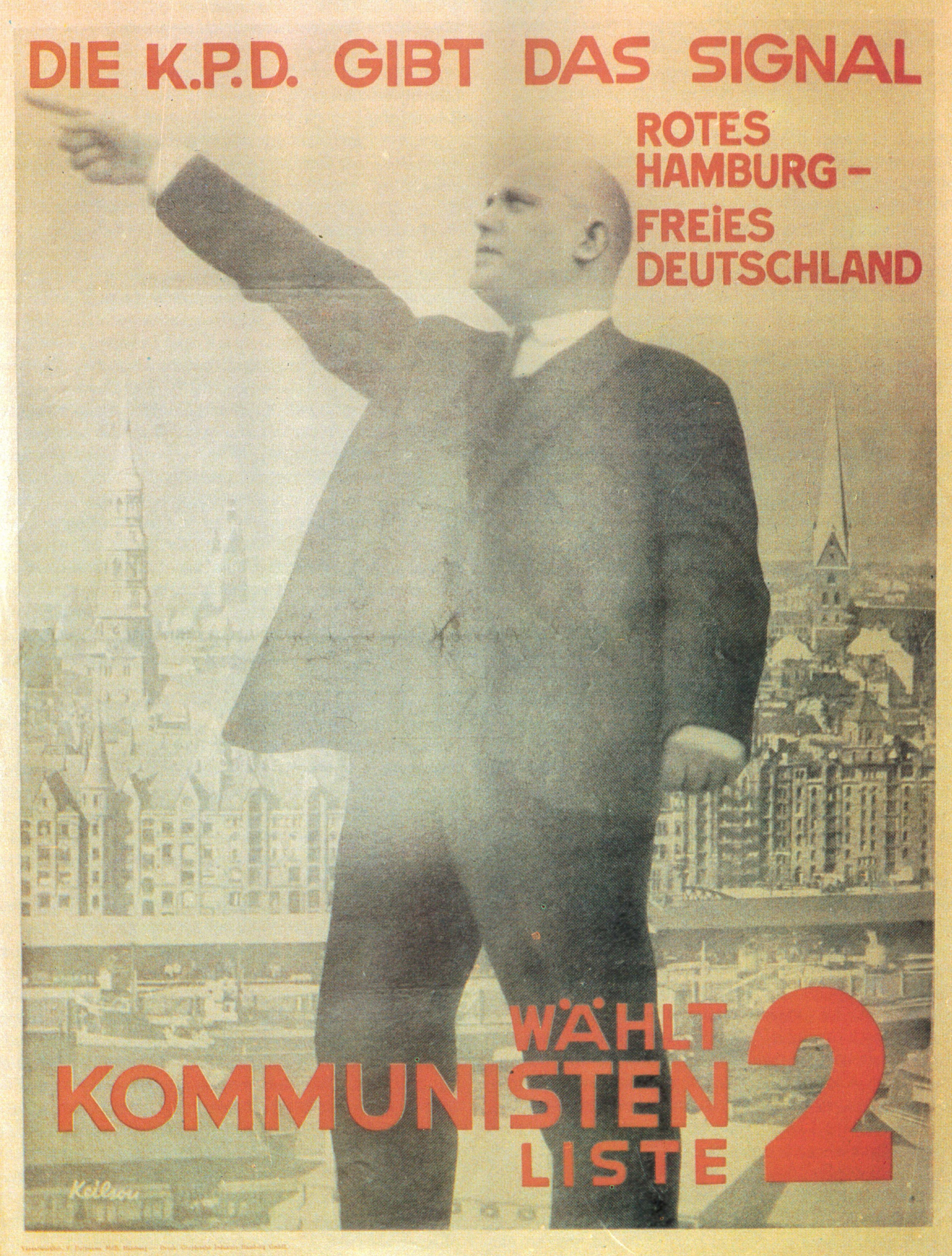
Thälmann on an election poster, 1932

After the Revolution of 1918 and during the Spartacist uprising, the government ordered the suppression of the revolt and the extrajudicial murders of KPD leaders Rosa Luxemburg and Karl Liebknecht by members of the Freikorps. That same year, the German Army under orders of the SPD-led republic government used military force against the Bavarian Soviet Republic. In 1920, there was a fierce suppression of the Ruhr uprising. At the 12th party congress of the KPD in June 1929 in Berlin-Wedding, Thälmann adopted a policy of confrontation with the SPD. This followed the events of "Bloody May", in which 32 people were killed by the police in an attempt to suppress demonstrations, which had been banned by the Interior Minister and SPD member Carl Severing.

Thälmann's KPD thus fought the SPD as one of their main political enemy, seeing it as a Bourgeoisie party, acting according to the Comintern policy, which declared social democrats to be "social fascists". This made it difficult for the two leftist parties to work together against the emergence of Adolf Hitler. The KPD under Thälmann declared that "fighting fascism means fighting the SPD just as much as it means fighting Hitler and the parties of Brüning." Thälmann declared in December 1931 that "some Nazi trees must not be allowed to overshadow a forest" of social democrats. This attitude was challenged by the Conciliator faction in 1928 and the "Neumann Group" in 1932, but Thälmann purged both from the party with Soviet support.

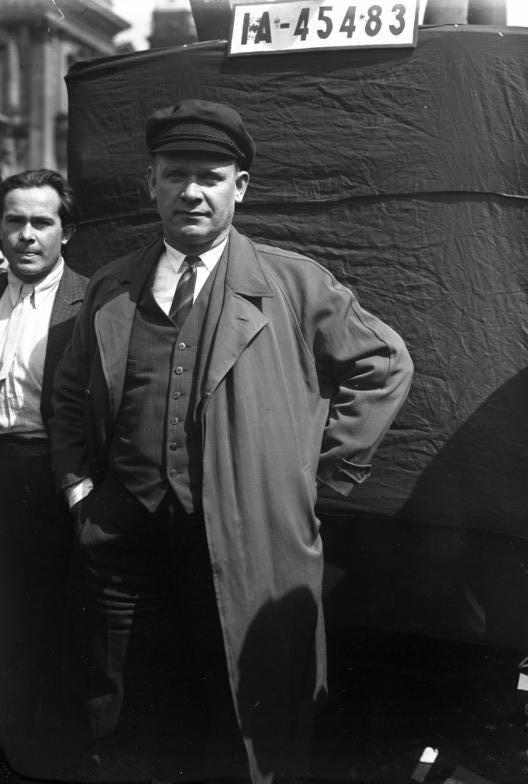
Thälmann campaigning for president, 1932

By 1927, Karl Kilbom, the Comintern representative to Germany, had started to combat this uncooperative tendency within the KPD but found Stalin machinating against his efforts. In March 1932, Thälmann was once again a candidate for the German Presidency against the incumbent Paul von Hindenburg and Hitler. The KPD's slogan was "A vote for Hindenburg is a vote for Hitler; a vote for Hitler is a vote for war". Thälmann returned as a candidate in the second round of the election, as it was permitted by the German electoral law; his vote count lessened from 4,983,000 (13.2%) in the first round to 3,707,000 (10.2%) in the second.

After the Nazis came to power in January 1933, Thälmann proposed that the SPD and KPD should organise a general strike to topple Hitler's rule. This was rejected by the SPD. In February 1933, a Central Committee meeting of the then already banned KPD took place at the "Sporthaus Ziegenhals" in Königs Wusterhausen, near Berlin, where Thälmann had called for the violent overthrow of Hitler's government. The Comintern's guidelines on social democracy as "social fascism" remained in force until 1935, when the Comintern officially switched to endorsing a "popular front" of socialists, liberals, and even conservatives against the fascist threat—an attempt to win over the leftist elements of the National Socialist German Workers' Party (NSDAP), especially the Storm Division (SA), who largely came from a working-class background and supported socialist economic policies. By that time, Hitler had risen to power to establish Nazi Germany and the KPD had been largely destroyed.

== Imprisonment and execution ==
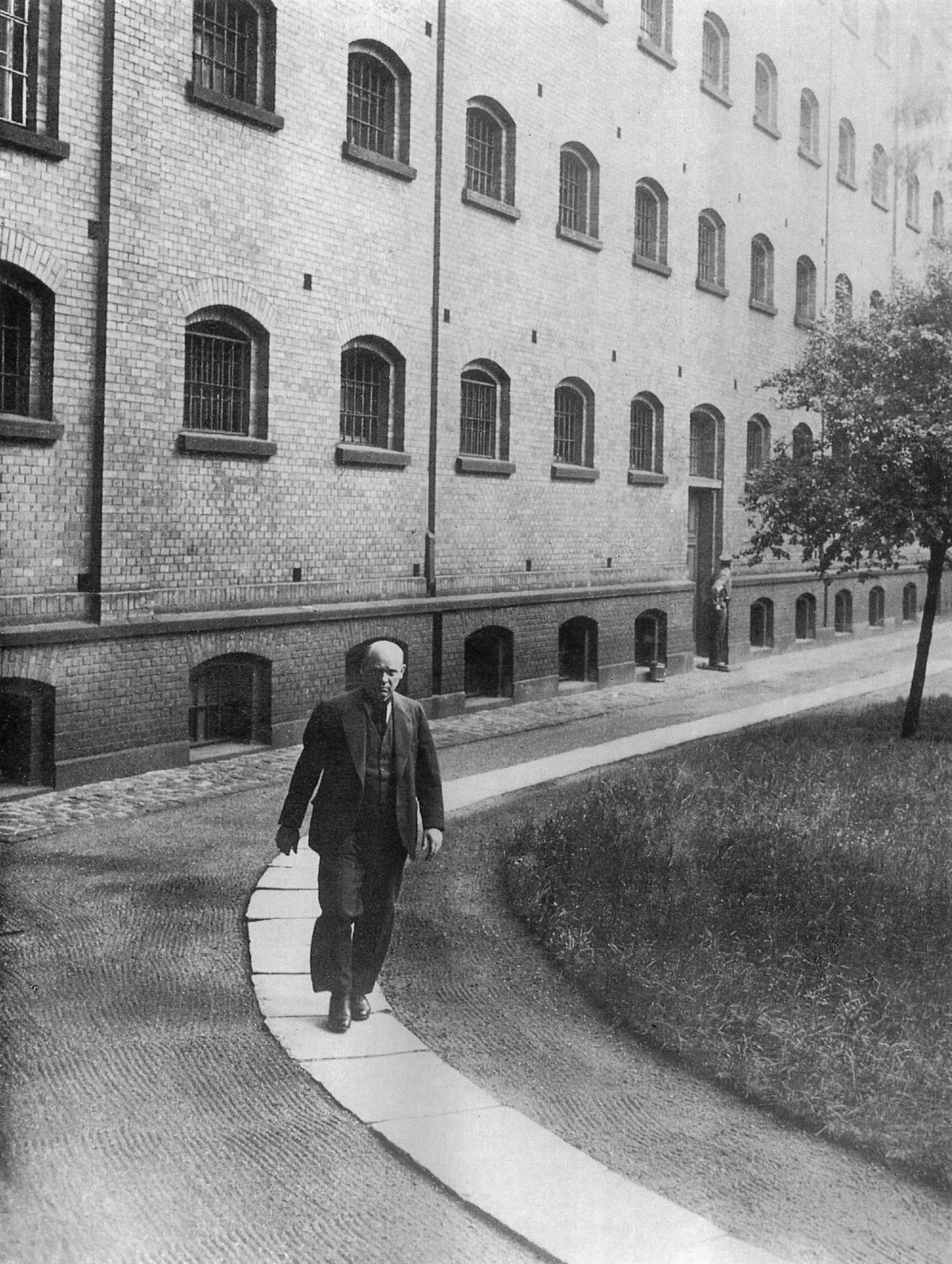
Thälmann in the courtyard of the Berlin-Moabit prison, May 1934

After the Reichstag Fire on 27 February 1933, the Nazi regime targeted members of the KPD and other left-wing opponents of it in a new wave of violence and arrests. Although having gone underground yet again, Thälmann was arrested and imprisoned together with his personal secretary Werner Hirsch on the afternoon of 3 March 1933. Eight officers of Police Station 121 arrested Thälmann at his supposed safehouse, the home of Hans and Martha Kluczynski in Berlin-Charlottenburg. Although the main police informant was a neighbor of the Kluczynskis, Hermann Hilliges, at least four other people informed the police of the connection between the Kluczynskis and Thälmann in the days before his arrest. Thälmann had used the home occasionally for several years, but started fully residing there in January 1933. Although it was not among the six illegal residences that the KPD had carefully prepared for Thälmann, it was not considered known to the police.

During imprisonment, Thälmann managed to smuggle out detailed notes about his treatment. He wrote that he was asked to inform on imprisoned comrades and to give the police details on various "political activities", which he refused. According to Thälmann, he recognized a number of his interrogators as former members of the Social Democrat politician Carl Severing's Political Police, who he had dealt with during the Weimar Republic. He wrote that his interrogators began with a "good guy" approach, before knocking his teeth out. According to Thälmann's notes, they then attempted hypnotism, unsuccessfully. Finally, they whipped him. He wrote: "[...] the actual high point of this drama was the final act. They ordered me to take off my pants and then two men grabbed me by the back of the neck and placed me across a footstool. A uniformed Gestapo officer with a whip of hippopotamus hide in his hand then beat my buttocks with measured strokes. Driven wild with pain I repeatedly screamed at the top of my lungs. Then they held my mouth shut for a while and hit me in the face, and with a whip across the chest and back. I then collapsed, rolled on the floor, always kept my face down and no longer replied to any of their questions."

Fellow German communist Wilhelm Pieck had managed to escape to the Soviet Union and in July 1936 issued a statement calling for the release of Thälmann. He stated: "If we succeeded in raising a tremendous storm of protest throughout the world, it will be possible to break down the prison walls and as in the case of Dimitrov, deliver Thälmann from the clutches of the Fascist hangmen. The fact that Ernst Thälmann has got to spend his fiftieth birthday in the gaols of Hitler-Fascism is an urgent reminder to all the anti-Fascists of the whole world that they must intensify to the utmost their campaign for the release of Thälmann and the many thousands of imprisoned victims of the White Terror." After the German–Soviet Non-Aggression Pact in 1939 and Germany's and the Soviet Union's joint invasion of Poland — and despite Thälmann's loyalty to Stalin during his time leading the KPD — Moscow pragmatically replaced a slogan for the 1939 International Youth Day, "Long live Comrade Thälmann!", with "Long live the wise foreign policy of the Soviet Union, guided by Comrade Stalin's instructions."

Thälmann spent over eleven years in solitary confinement. In August 1944, he was transferred from Bautzen prison to Buchenwald concentration camp. That month, Heinrich Himmler took notes during a conversation with Hitler saying: "Thälmann must be executed." A fellow Buchenwald prisoner, Marian Zgoda, recalls hearing the shooting of Thälmann on the 18th—four days after Himmler's curt annotation. After he was shot on Hitler's personal order, his body was immediately cremated. Shortly after, the Nazis announced that Thälmann had died in an Allied bombing raid on 23 August, together with Rudolf Breitscheid.

== Legacy ==
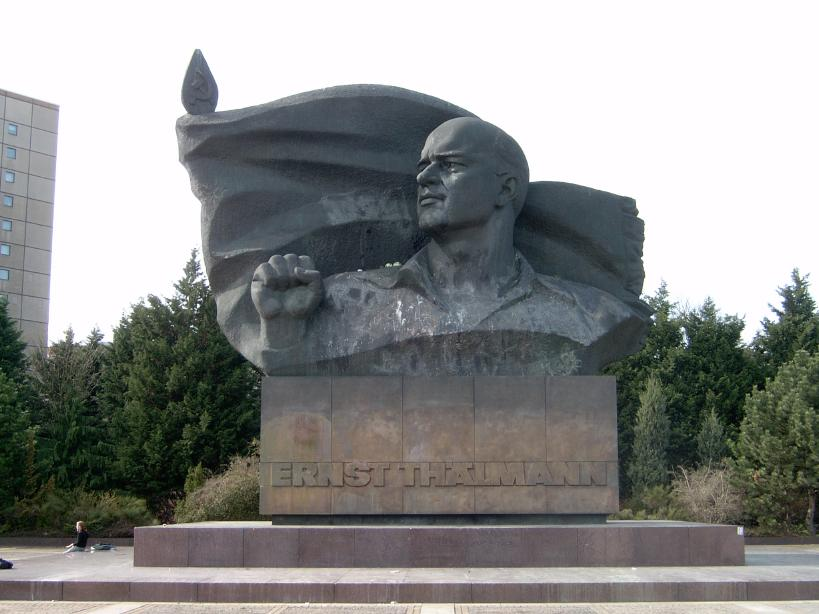
The Ernst Thälmann Monument was erected in 1986 in the Ernst-Thälmann-Park, Berlin.

During the Spanish Civil War, several units of German Republican volunteers (notably the Thälmann Battalion of the International Brigades) were named in his honour. During World War II, Yugoslavia's leader Tito organized a company of Danube Swabians and Wehrmacht defectors as the Ernst Thälmann Company to fight the Germans.

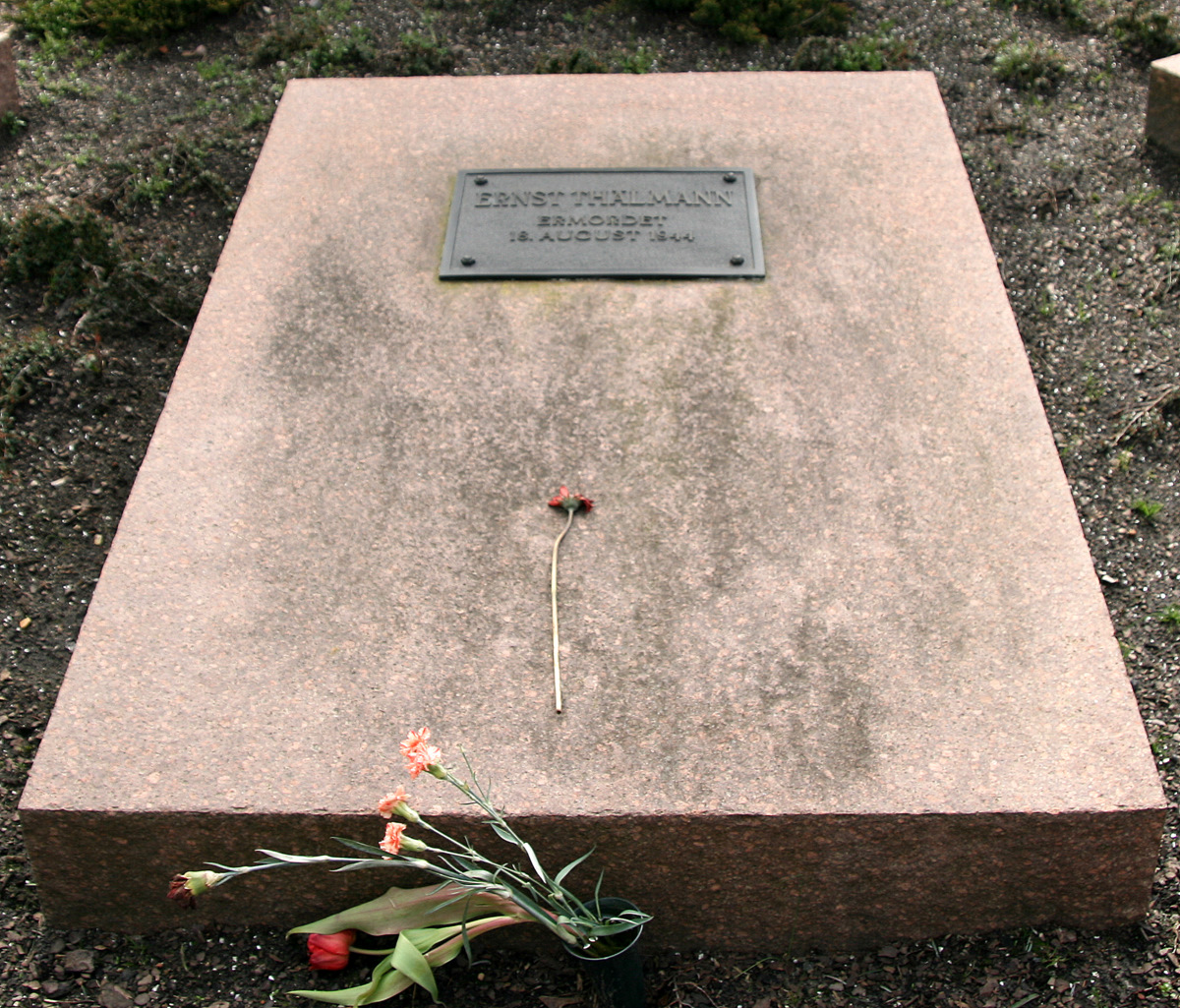
Thälmann's symbolic grave at the Memorial to the Socialists in Berlin

In 1935, the former town of Ostheim in Ukraine was renamed Telmanove (Donetsk Oblast). After 1945, Thälmann and other leading communists who had been murdered, such as Rosa Luxemburg and Karl Liebknecht, were widely honoured in East Germany, with many schools, streets, factories, and the like named after them. Thälmann, like Luxemburg and Liebknecht, was honoured with a symbolic grave at the Memorial to the Socialists (German: Gedenkstätte der Sozialisten) in the Friedrichsfelde Central Cemetery, Berlin. Many of these names were changed after German reunification; streets and squares named after Thälmann remain in Berlin, Hamburg, Greifswald, and Frankfurt an der Oder. The East German pioneer organisation was named the Ernst Thälmann Pioneer Organisation in his memory. Members pledged that "Ernst Thälmann is my role model ... I promise to learn to work and fight [struggle] as Ernst Thälmann teaches."

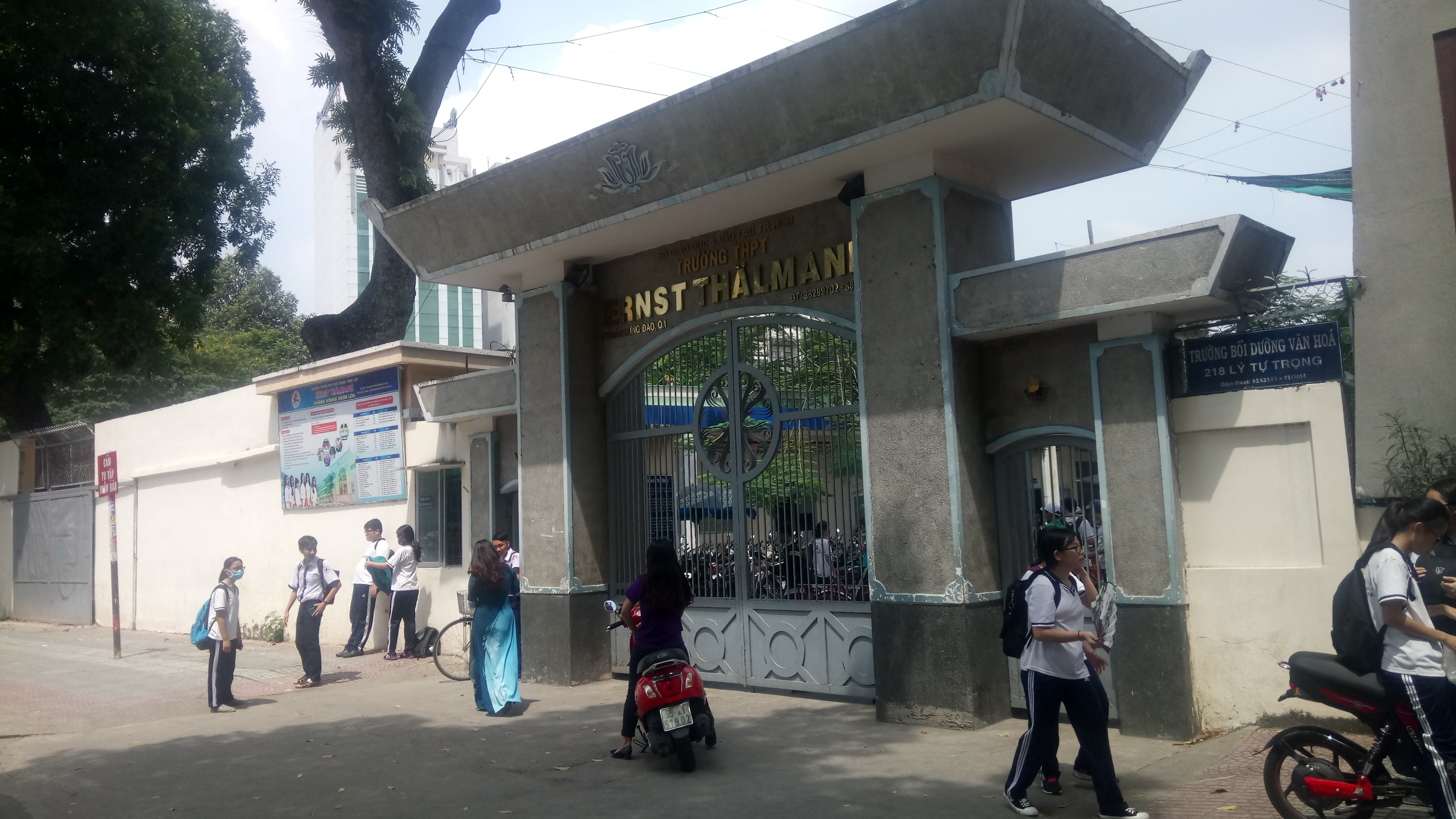
Trường THPT Ernst Thälmann (Ernst Thälmann High School) in Bến Thành, Ho Chi Minh City

In the 1950s, a two-part East German film, Ernst Thälmann, was produced. In 1972, Cuba named a small island, Cayo Ernesto Thaelmann, after him, and was seen as Cuba's gift to East Germany, which was not mentioned in the documents that incorporated East Germany into reunified Germany, leading to the urban legend that the German Democratic Republic still exists on the island. One of the main traffic arteries of Soviet Riga was named Ernsta Tēlmaņa iela after him on completion in 1981; however, soon after Latvia had regained independence in 1991 it was renamed Kārļa Ulmaņa gatve, after pre-World War II prime minister Kārlis Ulmanis. In Ho Chi Minh City, a highschool, THPT Ernst Thalmann (Ten-lơ-man) was named after him. The VEB Ernst Thälmann Waffenfabrik, an East German weapons factory in Suhl (formerly Simson), was named after Thälmann (until 1990). In Ulaanbaatar, a primary school's namesake was given after Ernst Thälmann, which is still in operation. The British Communist composer and activist Cornelius Cardew named his Thälmann Variations for piano in Thälmann's memory.

== Writings (selection) ==
- Ernst Thälmann, Der Kampf um die Gewerkschaftseinheit und die deutsche Arbeiterklasse. Referat und Schlußwort auf dem 10. Parteitag der KPD (in German), Berlin: Vereinigung Internationaler Verlagsanstalten
- Ernst Thälmann, Wedding gegen Magdeburg (revolutionärer Befreiungskampf oder kapitalistische Sklaverei) (in German), Berlin: Internationaler Arbeiter-Verlag
- Ernst Thälmann, Katastrophe oder Sozialismus? Ernst Thälmanns Kampfruf gegen die Notverordnungen (in German), Berlin: Internationaler Arbeiter-Verlag
- Ernst Thälmann, Ernst Thälmann und die Jugendpolitik der KPD (in German), Berlin: Verlag Junge Welt
- Ernst Thälmann (1996), An Stalin. Briefe aus dem Zuchthaus 1939 bis 1941 (in German), Berlin: Karl Dietz Verlag, ISBN 3-320-01927-9

== Films ==
- Ernst Thälmann – Sohn seiner Klasse, 1954, DDR.
- Ernst Thälmann — Führer seiner Klasse, 1955, DDR.
- Ernst Thälmann, 1986 DFF TV film, DDR.

== See also ==
- Ernst Thälmann Island

== Bibliography ==
- Biography of Ernst Thälmann on the website of the Deutsches Historisches Museum (in German)
- Lemmons, Russel (2013). Hitler's Rival: Ernst Thälmann in Myth and Memory. University Press of Kentucky.
