= Heinz Neumann =

German politician and journalist

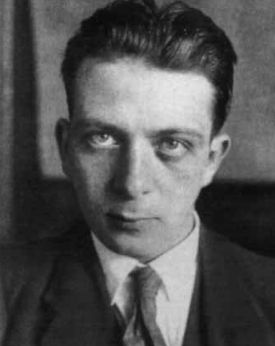
- Neumann c. 1930

Member of the Reichstag for Potsdam I
- In office 14 September 1930 – 6 November 1932
- Preceded by: Multi-member district
- Succeeded by: Multi-member district

Personal details
- Born: 6 July 1902 Berlin, Province of Brandenburg, Kingdom of Prussia, German Empire
- Died: 26 November 1937 (aged 35) Moscow, Soviet Union
- Cause of death: Execution by shooting
- Party: KPD (after 1920)
- Domestic partner: Margarete Buber-Neumann
- Children: Barbara (stepdaughter); Judith (stepdaughter)
- Occupation: Journalist; Politician; Revolutionary

Military service
- Allegiance: Revolutionaries; Canton Soviet
- Branch/service: Antimilitärischer Apparat; Red Guard
- Years of service: 1923; 1927
- Battles/wars: Hamburg Uprising; Guangzhou Uprising
- Central institution membership: 1929–1932: Full member, KPD Politburo; 1929–1932: Full member, KPD Central Committee; 1927–1929: Candidate member, KPD Central Committee

Heinz Neumann (6 July 1902 – 26 November 1937) was a German politician from the Communist Party (KPD) and a journalist. He was a member of the Communist International, editor in chief of the party newspaper Die Rote Fahne and a member of the Reichstag. He was one of the many victims to Stalin's Great Purge.

== Biography ==
Born in Berlin into a middle-class family, Neumann studied philology and came into contact with Marxist ideas. In 1920, he was admitted into the Communist Party by Ernst Reuter, then General Secretary. August Thalheimer took him under his wing. Neumann began writing editorials for various KPD newspapers in 1921. He dropped out of university in 1922 and became editor of the Rote Fahne (Red Flag). He was arrested and spent six months in prison, during which he took up Russian and learned it so well that he could speak to Soviet party officials without an interpreter. In 1922, he met Joseph Stalin on a trip and spoke to him in Russian. From that point until 1932, he was a strong supporter of Stalin.

Marx and Engels on Revolution in America by Heinz Neumann, 1925

He first belonged to the left wing of the KPD, led by Ruth Fischer. In 1923, he aligned himself with Arthur Ewert and Gerhart Eisler and became the political leader of the "Middle Group" in the party's Mecklenburg district. He participated in the Hamburg Uprising as a member of the party's Antimilitärischer Apparat and in 1924 had to flee to Vienna from where he was expelled to the Soviet Union in 1925. There, he succeeded Iwan Katz as Communist Party representative to the Comintern. From July to December 1927, he represented the Comintern in China. Working with Georgian communist Vissarion Lominadze, he helped Chinese communists organise the Guangzhou Uprising on 11 December 1927. The rebellion was a complete failure and resulted in great casualties. The Chinese communist leader Zhang Guotao blamed Neumann for that and claimed that the German had insisted that Guangzhou should be held at all cost against a National Revolutionary Army counter-offensive although that was not feasible for the local communists.

Neumann went back to Germany in 1928 and after the Wittorf Affair became one of the most important politicians of the KPD. He was considered the major theoretician of the party and became editor in chief of the Rote Fahne. As the chief ideologist, he was responsible for the ultra-left policies, the Revolutionäre Gewerkschafts Opposition and the social fascism policy, which were aimed mainly at toppling the ruling SPD. At the same time, he encouraged fighting the Nazis whenever expedient and coined the slogan Schlagt die Faschisten, wo ihr sie trefft! ("Beat the fascists wherever you meet them!"), which was valid until 1932.

Along with fellow Reichstag deputy Hans Kippenberger, Neumann was the leader of the KPD's paramilitary wing, the Parteiselbstschutz (Party Self-Defence Unit, a part of the AM-Apparat). As such, Neumann had a major role in planning the 1931 assassination of Paul Anlauf and Franz Lenck, both of whom were SPD members and Precinct Captains in the Berlin Police. However, Neumann's partner at the time, Margarete Buber-Neumann, denied any such involvement: "Heinz Neumann was an opponent of individual terror and had nothing to do with the KPD's terror apparatus."

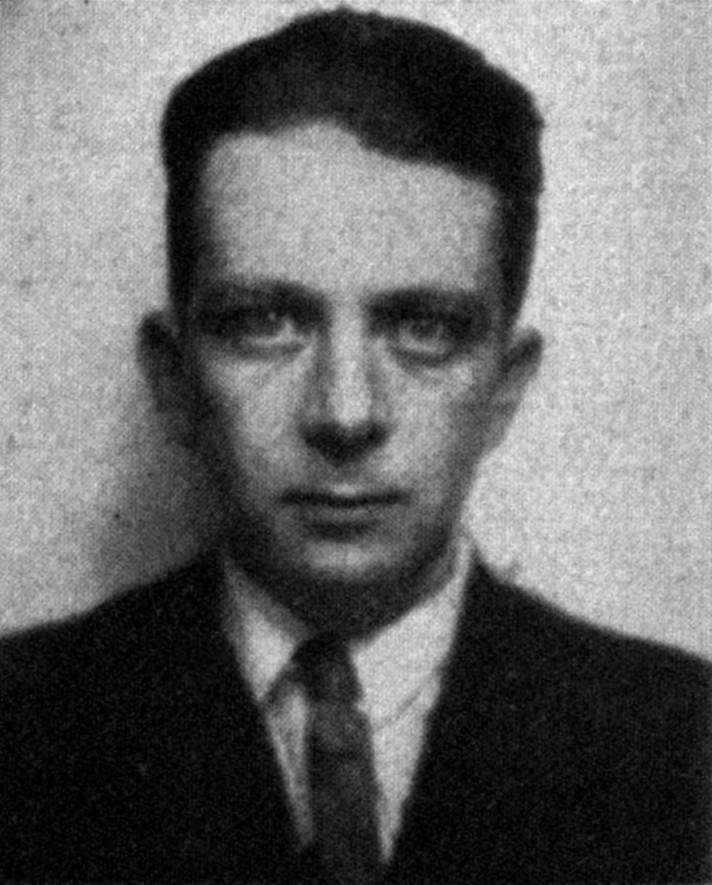
Neumann's official Reichstag portrait, 1930

Elected to the Reichstag in 1930, in 1931, Neumann began to disagree openly with both Stalin and the KPD leader, Ernst Thälmann. Neumann felt that by focusing exclusively on toppling the ruling SPD, the KPD was underestimating the growing threat posed by the Nazi Party, with which the KPD was often allying itself against the SPD. In retaliation for his dissenting stance, Neumann's motion was defeated and in April 1932 he was relieved of all his party functions; in November he even lost his seat in the Reichstag.

Other members of the so-called "Neumann Group" included Politburo members Hermann Remmele, Leo Flieg and Franz Dahlem, Central Committee members Willi Münzenberg, Friedrich Lux and Josef Schlaffer, Baden-Palatinate political leader Karl Fischer, Berlin-Brandenberg organizational leader Albert Kuntz, illegal RFB first secretary Paul Hornick, Women's Section head Roberta Gropper, Central Committee technical secretary Willi Mielenz, KJVD leaders Kurt Müller, Alfred Hiller, Ernst Bertram, Bruno Dubber and Franz Fischer, and Die Rote Fahne editor Alexander Abusch and deputy editor Albert Norden, most of whom were also punished.

Neumann was sent to the Second Spanish Republic to represent the Comintern and then lived illegally in Switzerland. In September 1933, the public prosecutor of Berlin, based on the confessions of 15 of his co-conspirators, charged Neumann with first-degree murder for his involvement in the murders of Captains Anlauf and Lenck.

In January 1934, while still a fugitive from the German police, Neumann was accused of having tried to split the KPD and was forced to write a criticism and self-criticism. In late 1934, he was arrested in Zurich by the Swiss immigration authorities and was imprisoned for six months after which he was expelled. He was sent to the Soviet Union, where he fell victim to the Great Purge.

== Death ==
Heinz Neumann was arrested by the NKVD on 27 April 1937. On November 26, 1937, he was sentenced to death by the Military Collegium of the Supreme Court of the Soviet Union. He was shot on the same day.

== Personal life ==
Heinz Neumann began dating Margarete Buber-Neumann in 1929 and later lived in unmarried union with her. After he disappeared in the Great Purge, she was also arrested and served time in the Gulag.

After the German-Soviet Pact, Buber-Neumann was handed over to the Nazi Gestapo, along with many other KPD members whom Stalin had sent to the Gulag. After her return to Germany, Buber-Neumann was imprisoned by the Nazis in Ravensbrück concentration camp but survived to write her memoirs of both the Gulag and the German death camps. After her release, Buber-Neumann spent the remainder of her life as an outspoken believer in the moral equivalency of Nazism and communism. She died in 1989, just days before the fall of the Berlin Wall.

== Works ==
- Die vaterländischen Mörder Deutschlands. Bayern in der kleinen Entente. Das Ergebnis des Münchener Hochverratsprozesses. Berlin 1923 (with Karl Frank)
- Maslows Offensive gegen den Leninismus. Kritische Bemerkungen zur Parteidiskussion. Hamburg 1925
- Was ist Bolschewisierung? Hamburg 1925
- Der ultralinke Menschewismus. Berlin 1926
- J. W. Stalin. Hamburg 1930
- Durch rote Einheit zur Macht. Heinz Neumanns Abrechnung mit der Politik des sozialdemokratischen Parteivorstandes. Berlin 1931
- Prestes, der Freiheitsheld von Brasilien. Moskau 1936.

== Bibliography ==
- Tsin, Michael T. W. (2002). Nation, Governance, and Modernity in China: Canton, 1900-1927. Stanford, California: Stanford University Press.
