= Troika (European group) =

The European Commission, the European Central Bank and the International Monetary Fund

The Troika is a term used to refer to the single decision group created by three entities, the European Commission (EC), the European Central Bank (ECB) and the International Monetary Fund (IMF). It was formed due to the European debt crisis as an ad hoc authority with a mandate to manage the bailouts of Cyprus, Greece, Ireland and Portugal, in the aftermath of their prospective insolvency caused by the 2008 financial crisis.

Earlier, "troika" had been used as the designation of a triumvirate that represented the European Union in its foreign relations, in particular concerning its common foreign and security policy (CFSP), until the Treaty of Lisbon was ratified in 2009.

== Background of the financial crisis bailout troika ==
=== Role of the Troika ===
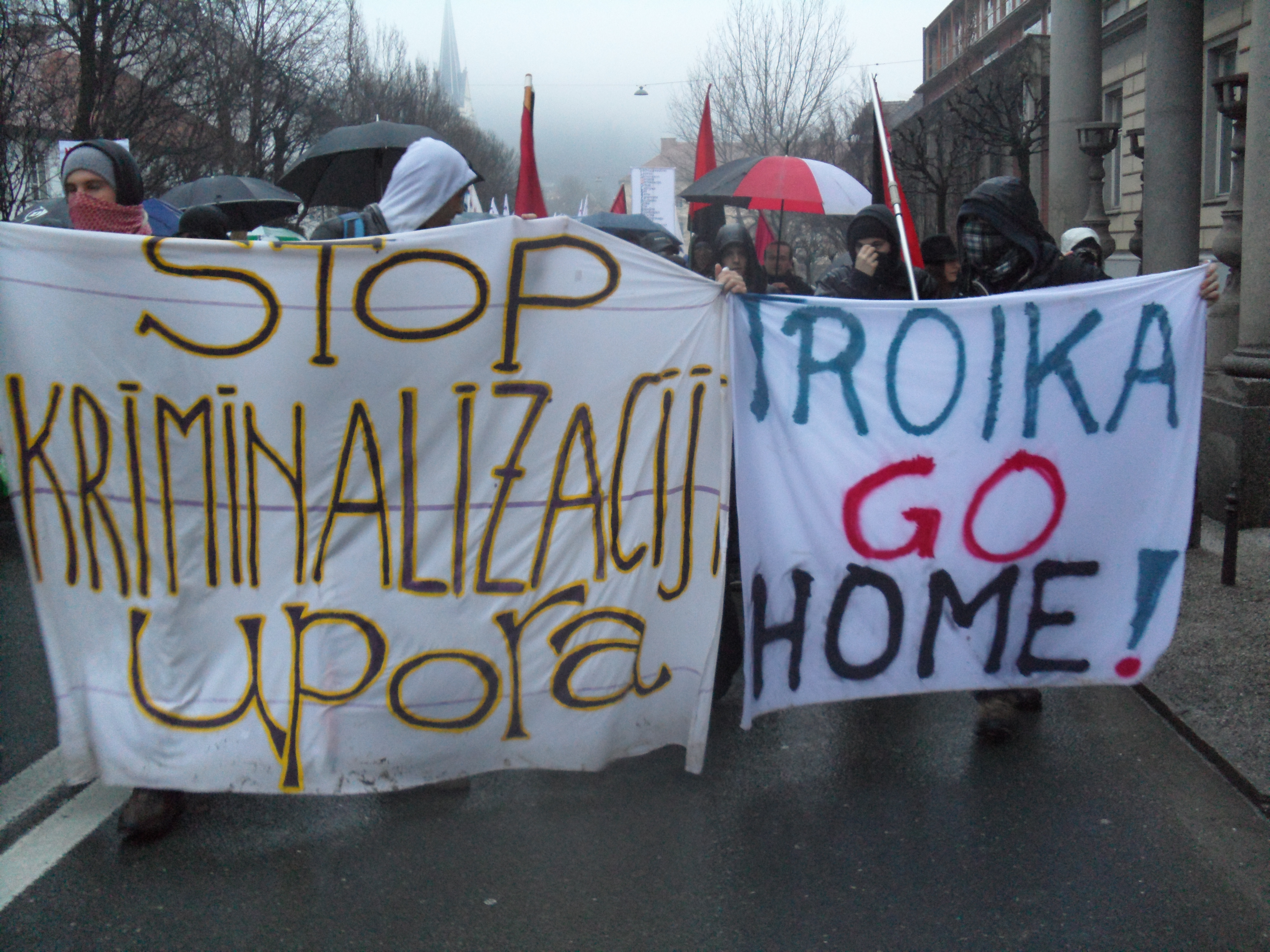
2013 protests against the Troika in Slovenia

The term Troika has been widely used in Greece, Cyprus (Greek: τρόικα), Ireland, Portugal, and Spain to refer to the consortium of the European Commission, the European Central Bank and the International Monetary Fund that provided a bailout to these states since 2010, and the financial measures and government policies that the three institutions have demanded to be implemented in return by Greece and the other nations concerned. Slovenia barely avoided intervention by the Troika in 2013, thanks to the loan of EUR 1.5 billion from PIMCO. These institutions had wide influence and increased their power over time. They implemented a strong austerity program for the adjustment of Greek fiscal measures. The political impact of the austerity imposed on countries of the EU periphery, which were confronted with significant debt, led to "a predominant economic and social dislocation".

=== Economic adjustment programmes ===
The origin of the European Troika can be traced back to the Greek loan package of May 2010 and the EFSF. The work of the three members were distinct: the IMF co-financed the loans for Greece, the ECB focused its competences on the banking system and the Commission worked on economic reforms with the IMF. The "Troika solution" was controversial in the solution to the euro area crisis following the Lisbon Treaty, as supranational organizations increased their presence among the institutional landscape of the European Union. At this time, the EU was more technocratic and emphasised the controlling aspect of the Troika mechanism. During the crisis period, Germany played a dominant role and took power to rebalance its national interests. The European strategy was implemented with the goal of reducing the Greek fiscal deficit from 15% to 5%. In 2015, the GDP of Greece remained stagnant compared to 2009, and the loans appeared to be insufficient to achieve the fiscal goals fixed by the Troika: 90% of the amount paid interest.

For Cyprus, Greece (thrice), Ireland and Portugal, the European Commission, the ECB and the IMF agreed on Memoranda of Understanding with the relevant governments in a three-year financial aid programme on the condition of far-reaching austerity measures to be imposed on their societies in order to cut government expenditure.

For details in each case, see

- Economic Adjustment Programme for Cyprus
- First Economic Adjustment Programme for Greece
- Second Economic Adjustment Programme for Greece
- Third Economic Adjustment Programme for Greece
- Economic Adjustment Programme for Ireland
- Economic Adjustment Programme for Portugal

=== Evolution ===
Social benefits and wages could not be sustained due to the crisis. With a deteriorating social situation and weak domestic production, growth of Greek debt overtook the GDP rate. For the creditor countries, one of the most important conditions for the bailout was the liberalisation of production and the labour market in Greece. Reforms taken in a context of fiscal austerity can have negative effects without short-term improvement.

== Institutions involved ==
The term troika has its origins in the Russian word for a three-horse carriage, but it is also used to describe an informal alliance between three actors. In the context of the euro area crisis, the term "Troika" refers to the cooperation between three actors: the European Commission, the European Central Bank (ECB) and the International Monetary Fund (IMF).

The Troika set out the conditions under which financial assistance, or promises of assistance, would be approved to European countries in financial difficulties. When the three organisations offered assistance, the necessary measures and reforms were imposed in the form of a Memorandum of Understanding between the Troika and the Member States concerned.

The legal basis for the action taken by the Commission and the ECB is considered debatable. The creation of this mechanism was due to a political and legal gap in the Treaty of Maastricht. Article 125 TFEU together with article 123 TFEU prevents countries of the eurozone with financial problems from being supported by other stakeholders, like the European Central Bank, European Union institutions or other Eurozone countries within the Monetary Union. Therefore, the competences of the Troika originated in a statement taken by the Heads of State and Government of the EU member states to establish a joint programme and to provide conditional bilateral loans to Greece. The Troika falls outside the scope of European law.

The Troika can be considered as a working group in charge of negotiating financial assistance programmes with indebted Eurozone countries. Apart from that, it also carries out evaluations of the implementation level of the programme. The financial assistance in itself is provided by special mechanisms, such as the European Financial Stability Facility (EFSF), the European Financial Stabilisation Mechanism (EFSM) and the European Stability Mechanism (ESM). These financial programmes are concluded outside the European Treaties, and thus outside of the jurisdiction of EU law. However, all EU institutions should act in accordance with the Rule of Law, even when exercising authority outside of the Treaties.

=== International Monetary Fund ===
A role for the International Monetary Fund (IMF) as a member of the Troika was not considered at the time. Firstly, this organisation is an "outsider"; it is not an institution of the European Union. A second objection was that relying on the IMF's help was an admission of failure of the Eurozone, and a dent in confidence in the euro. In the months leading up to the euro area crisis, the IMF already had concerns that countries in the European periphery would be a potential threat to the other major financial markets in Europe via their commercial banks' balance sheet exposures. When the first effects of the crisis emerged in Greece, the IMF was kept at a distance. The EU saw this as an internal matter and wanted to resolve it internally, yet the IMF was pulled in eventually. It was seen as a reliable, neutral organisation that had expertise in helping highly indebted countries. The IMF was responsible, together with the finance ministers, for the decision-making in the financial programmes.

=== European Commission ===
The role of the European Commission within the European Troika was to participate in the Troika negotiations and the periodical supervising exercises on behalf of the Eurozone Member States that provided the loans to the Eurozone (EZ) countries in financial need. This function raised some concerns with the 'independent' function of the European Commission within the EU's political framework. According to article 17 of the TEU "the Commission has to act completely independent in carrying out its responsibilities, and they shall refrain from any action incompatible with their duties or the performance of their tasks."

The fact that the Commission was acting on behalf of the member states in the case of financial assistance programs was far removed from its political role. The question remains as to how the Commission can reconcile its task within the EU and within the Troika. By acting on behalf of some Member States, the Commission is departing from its independent position.

=== European Central Bank ===
Formally the European Central Bank (ECB) does not participate in the decision-making of the programme, these decisions are taken by the IMF and the Finance ministers of the Member States. The role of the ECB can be divided into three groups: A first aspect is the role of verbal interventions addressed to distressed Member States and financial markets. Its second role is the one where the ECB changes collateral policy and large-scale medium-term liquidity creation to encourage markets to invest in higher-yielding government bonds. Its third and most controversial role is the one where the ECB launches the Securities Market Programme, a kind of shaping programme that targets fiscal adjustment and structural reforms in the fiscal policy of individual member states. The ECB also provides advice and expertise on a broad range of issues relevant to the monetary policy and the financial stability of the eurozone countries.

== Criticism ==
The consequences of the decisions taken by the European Troika resulted in many critics both within the European institutions and at national levels. The European Parliament was excluded from negotiations and therefore decided to establish a special committee of inquiry led by the Austrian centre-right MEP Othmar Karas in order to analyse the level of the Troika's accountability. According to the findings of the committee, the Troika's members had highly asymmetric distribution of responsibilities. In addition, differing mandates together with varying negotiation and decision-making structures only led to more divisions and made it difficult to find a common approach. The British MEP Sharon Bowles observed that the response to the crisis lacked transparency and even credibility. In fact, the Troika had questionable legal basis at all because it was established as an emergency solution. German politician Norbert Lammert stated that in his view it was incorrect to discuss the lack of democratic legitimacy of the Troika since the adjustment programmes had been approved by the parliaments of Ireland, Portugal, Cyprus and Greece; however, the parliaments did not know the implications when they approved the programmes.

The Troika interventions generated long-lasting political damage not only for the European Union but also for the member states themselves. Many European citizens claimed that the budget cuts resulted in the EZ's longest recession since the creation of the Euro single currency in 1999. During that period, the efficiency of the Troika was another cause of concern but the ECB president Jean-Claude Trichet tried to reassure people and highlighted the fact that "if nothing had been done for Greece, the impact of the crisis would have been undeniably worse for this country". As it turned out, the Troika underestimated the impact of austerity policies on economic growth.

Another problem was in the different philosophies in relation to economic policy across the EC, the ECB and the IMF according to the European Commissioner in charge of economic and monetary affairs Olli Rehn. Whereas the IMF advocated for more robust debt relief, the EU insisted on more limited options. The European institutions prioritised the maintenance of cohesion and protection of their own rules. Also, the members of the Troika could not agree upon potential risks of financial spillovers across member states of the EZ. For the European institutions, this was a very sensitive topic; this is why the objective was to avoid debt restructuring. If the Troika had paid more attention to cross-country spillovers and deteriorating conditions, the consequences could have been less harmful.

The academic community criticised the Troika, accusing it of having immense power and pursuing an approach of fiscal conservatism. Scholars such as Kevin Featherstone, Judith Clifton, Daniel Diaz-Fuentes and Ana Lara Gómez came to the conclusion that austerity policies in Greece were more harsh than in Ireland, emphasising political and socio-economic consequences, specifically unemployment, emigration, and deterioration of citizens' physical and mental health. Other critics of the Troika included Yanis Varoufakis, a former Greek finance minister; German writer and publisher of Die Gazette Fritz R. Glunk; and Noam Chomsky.

== Earlier troika (Common foreign and security policy) ==
This term was used in the European Union when referring to a triumvirate composed of the Foreign Affairs Minister of the Member State holding the (rotating) Presidency of the Council of Ministers, the Secretary-General of the Council of the European Union (who also held the post of High Representative of the Common Foreign and Security Policy), and the European Commissioner for External Relations. The "troïka" represented the European Union in external relations that fell within the scope of the common foreign and security policy (CFSP).

With the 2009 ratification of the Lisbon Treaty, the post of Secretary-General of the Council was separated from the post of High Representative for the CFSP, which then assumed the responsibilities of the European Commissioner for External Relations. Since only two of the original posts making up the troika still exist, the definition of a triumvirate is no longer met.

== See also ==
- European debt crisis
- 2012–13 Cypriot financial crisis
- Greek government-debt crisis
- Post-2008 Irish banking crisis
- 2010–14 Portuguese financial crisis
