= Joseph Agassi =

Israeli academic (1927–2023)

- יוסף אגסי
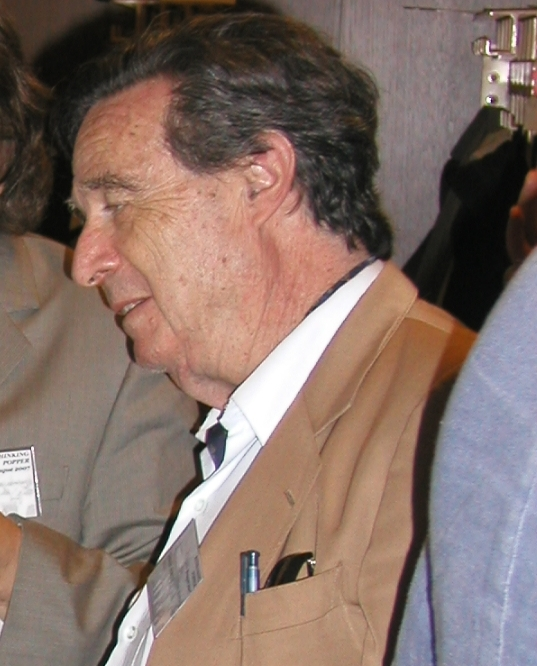
- Agassi in 2007
- Born: Joseph Birnbaum; 7 May 1927; Jerusalem, Mandatory Palestine
- Died: 22 January 2023 (aged 95); Herzliya, Israel
- Spouse: Judith Buber Agassi

Joseph Agassi (/ˈæɡəsi/; Hebrew: יוסף אגסי; born Joseph Birnbaum; 7 May 1927 – 22 January 2023) was an Israeli academic with contributions in logic, scientific method, and philosophy. He studied under Karl Popper at the London School of Economics, where he completed his PhD in 1956 with a dissertation titled The Function of Interpretations in Physics.

Agassi taught in the Department of Philosophy of the University of Hong Kong from 1960 to 1963. He later taught at the University of Illinois, Boston University, and York University in Canada. He had dual appointments in the last positions with Tel Aviv University.

== Personal life and death ==
Agassi was born into a Haredi family who lived in Jerusalem's Buchari neighborhood. In his youth studied in the Mercaz haRav yeshiva in Jerusalem. Later he left religious life.

He was married to Judith Buber Agassi – Martin Buber's granddaughter – from 1949 until her death in 2018. Together they had two children, Tirzah, who died of cancer in March 2008, and Aaron. Agassi resided in Herzliya, Israel. Tirzah's name, when she was a child, was often used by Popper in his dictum "Write it for Tirzah!" to explain his view that everyone has the duty to write in a clearly and easily understandable language. Agassi died on 22 January 2023, at the age of 95.

== Philosophy ==
Agassi's prime interest was in science, metaphysics, and politics. He took it that philosophy is nothing if not rationalist. For over fifty years he studied the rationality of science, metaphysics, and democratic politics.

An advocate of Popper's philosophy with variations, Agassi ignored many of the problems that concern some philosophers of science, chiefly that of theory choice. The problems of the philosophy of technology engaged him, including the problem of choosing scientific theories and ideas worthy of application and implementation.

== Israeli politics ==
Agassi had expressed criticism against the settler movement and advocated for Israel to "separate" from the worldwide Jewish community:

The flimsy excuse – the notion that Israel belongs to the Jewish people and not to the Israeli nation – is the very threat to its independence. It is therefore imperative that Israel should recognize its nation as separate and different from the Jewish people.

He was close to Hillel Kook who advocated severely limiting the Right of Return, forming a "Hebrew Nation" and creation of a Constitution already in 1948. Agassi was very much influenced by these views.

== Global politics ==
Agassi had written widely on global politics and on the methodology to implement global politics. His methodology was consistently procedural, without having requests for systematic procedures. His demands from those who design global politics are minimalist: small methodological changes may lead to large-scale achievements.

Agassi also proposed to bring global problems to public agendas for discussions in different forums, in particular in workshops where discussions are held with an agreed-upon agenda: the agenda, said Agassi, should be discussed and set by the participants prior to the discussion.

== Publications ==
=== Books in English ===
- Towards an Historiography of Science, History and Theory, Beiheft 2, 1963; facsimile reprint, Middletown: Wesleyan University Press, 1967.
- The Continuing Revolution: A History of Physics From The Greeks to Einstein, New York: McGraw Hill, 1968.
- Faraday as a Natural Philosopher, Chicago, Chicago University Press, 1971.
- Science in Flux, Boston Studies in the Philosophy of Science, Dordrecht, Reidel, 28, 1975.
- (with Yehuda Fried) Paranoia: A Study in Diagnosis, Boston Studies in the Philosophy of Science, 50, 1976.
- Towards a Rational Philosophical Anthropology, The Hague: Martinus Nijhoff, 1977.
- Science and Society: Studies in the Sociology of Science, Boston Studies, 65, 1981.
- (with Yehuda Fried) Psychiatry as Medicine, Dordrecht: Kluwer, 1983.
- Technology: Philosophical and Social Aspects, Dordrecht: Kluwer, 1985.
- The Gentle Art of Philosophical Polemics: Selected Reviews and Comments, LaSalle IL: Open Court, 1988.
- (with Nathaniel Laor) Diagnosis: Philosophical and Medical Perspectives, Dordrecht: Kluwer, 1990.
- The Siblinghood of Humanity: Introduction to Philosophy, Delmar NY: Caravan Press, 1990, 1991.
- Radiation Theory and the Quantum Revolution, Basel: Birkhäuser, 1993.
- A Philosopher's Apprentice: In Karl Popper's Workshop, Series in the Philosophy of Karl R. Popper and Critical Rationalism, Amsterdam and Atlanta GA: Editions Rodopi, 1993. Second edition, 2008. Contents
- Liberal Nationalism for Israel: Towards an Israeli National Identity, Jerusalem and New York: Gefen. Translation from the Hebrew book of 1984.
- Science and Culture, Boston Studies in the Philosophy of Science, 231, 2003.
- (with I. C. Jarvie) A Critical Rationalist Aesthetics, Series in the Philosophy of Karl R. Popper and Critical Rationalism, Amsterdam: Rodopi, 2008.
- (with Abraham Meidan) Philosophy from a Skeptical Perspective, NY and Cambridge: Cambridge University Press, 2008.
- Science and Its History: A Reassessment of the Historiography of Science, Boston Studies in the Philosophy of Science, 253, 2008. (This includes a corrected reprint of Towards an Historiography of Science, History and Theory)
- The Philosophy of Practical Affairs: An Introduction, Lexington Books, November 14, 2022.
- (with Uri Weiss) Games to Play and Games not to Play, Studies in Systems, Decision and Control (SSDC, volume 469), Springer, Springer Nature, 2023.

=== Books in Hebrew ===
- Letters to My Sister Concerning Contemporary Philosophy, Omer: Sarah Batz, 1976 1977. New enlarged edition, Tel-Aviv, Yedioth Aharonoth Books and Chemed Books, 2000.
- (with Dov Rappel) Philosophy of Education: A Philosophical Dialogue, Israeli Ministry of Defense, 1979.
- Between Faith and Nationality: Towards an Israeli National Identity, Tel-Aviv: Papirus, Tel-Aviv University, 1984. Second Edition, Revised and enlarged, 1993. English translation, 1999.
- (with Moshe Berent, and Judith Buber Agassi), Israeli National Awareness, Discussion Paper No. 11–88, 1988. Sapir Center for Development, Tel-Aviv University.
- Albert Einstein: Unity and Diversity, Israeli Ministry of Defense, 1989, 1994, and 2000.
- The Philosophy of Technology, Israeli Ministry of Defense, 1990.
- J. A., Judith Buber Agassi and Moshe Berent, Who is an Israeli? Rehovot: Kivunim, 1991. A variant of the Discussion Paper.
- The History of Modern Philosophy from Bacon to Kant (1600–1800): An Introduction. Tel-Aviv: Ramot, Tel-Aviv University, 1993 and reprints.
- An Introduction to Modern Philosophy, Israeli Ministry of Defense, 1996.
- (With Yeshayahu Leibowitz) Chemi Ben-Noon, editor, Conversations Concerning the Philosophy of Science, Israeli Ministry of Defense, 1996.
- (With Yeshayahu Leibowitz) Chemi Ben-Noon, editor, The Limits of Reason: Thought, Science and Religion; Yeshayahu Leibowitz and Joseph Agassi in Conversation, Jerusalem: Keter, 1997.
- (with Abraham Meidan) Beg to Differ: The Logic of Disputes and Argumentation, Springer, 2016

=== Books in Italian ===
- Scienza, metodolgia e societá, edited by Michael Segre, Roma: Luiss Edizioni, 2000. 186 pp.
- Michael Segre, Accademia e società, Conversazioni con Joseph Agassi, Rubbatino Editore, 2004, 129 pages.
- Joseph Agassi, La filosofia e l'individuo – Come un filosofo della scienza vede la vita, Di Renzo Editore, Roma, 2005

=== Books edited ===
- Psychiatric Diagnosis: Proceedings of an International Interdisciplinary Interschool Symposium, Bielefeld Universität, 1978, Philadelphia: Balaban Intl. Science Service, 1981. 184 pp.
- (With Robert S. Cohen), Scientific Philosophy Today: Essays in Honor of Mario Bunge, Boston Studies in the Philosophy of Science, 67, 1982. 503 pp.
- (With I. C. Jarvie), Rationality: The Critical View, Dordrecht: Kluwer, 1987. xi+462 pp.
- Hebrew Translation of Karl Popper's The Open Society and Its Enemies, Jerusalem, Shalem Publications, forthcoming, 2005.

=== Online papers ===
- A Note on Smith's Term "Naturalism"
- Anthropomorphism in Science
- Brainwashing
- Bye Bye Weber
- Can Adults Become Genuinely Bilingual?
- Causality and Medicine
- Deception: A View from the Rationalist Perspective
- Deconstructing Post-Modernism: Gellner and Crocodile Dundee
- Dissertation without tears
- Halakha and Agada
- Israeli Judaism
- Jacob Katz on Jewish Social History
- Karl Popper
- Leibniz's Place in the History of Physics
- Let a Thousand Flowers Bloom: Popper's Popular Critics
- Liberal Forensic Medicine
- Liberal Nationalism for Israel
- Liberal Nationalism (Chapters from the book in Russian)
- Movies Seen Many Times
- Neo-Classical Economics as 18th Century Theory of Man
- One Palestine
- On the Limits of Scientific Explanation: Hempel and Evans-Pritchard
- On the open grave of Hillel Kook
- Prescriptions for Responsible Psychiatry
- Quanta in Context
- Rights and Reason
- Science Education Without Pressure
- Scientific Literacy
- Summary of AFOS Workshop, 1994
- Tautology and Testability in Economics
- Technology: Philosophical and Social Aspects The Gro
- Brundtland Report (1987) Or, The Logic of Awesome Decisions
- The Heuristic Bent
- The Interface of Philosophy and Physics
- The Ivory Tower and the Seat of Power
- The Lakatosian Revolution
- The Last Refuge of the Scoundrel
- The Novelty of Chomsky's Theories
- Theoretical Bias in Evidence: a Historical Sketch
- The Philosophy of Science Today
- The Role of the Philosopher among the Scientists: Nuisance or Necessity?
- The Theory and Practice of the Welfare State
- To Save Verisimilitude
- Training to Survive the Hazard Called Education
- Variations on the Liar's Paradox
- Verisimilitude
- Who Discovered Boyle's Law?
