= Young Communist League of Germany =

Political youth organisation in early 20th-century Germany

- Founded: 1920
- Headquarters: Germany
- Ideology: Communism

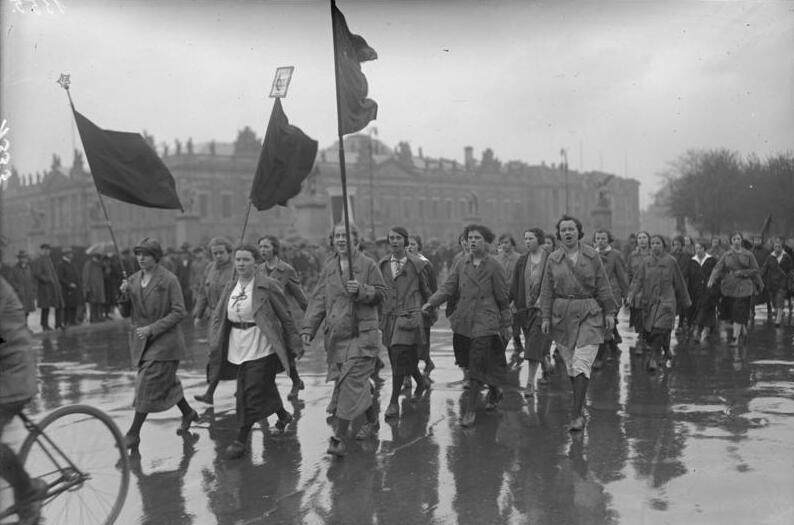
Communist youth marching in 1925 May Day rally in Berlin.

The Young Communist League of Germany (Kommunistischer Jugendverband Deutschlands, abbreviated KJVD) was a political youth organization in Germany.

== History ==
The KJVD was formed in 1920 from the Free Socialist Youth (Freie Sozialistische Jugend) of the Communist Party of Germany, A prior youth wing had been formed in October 1918, with the support from the Spartacus League (Spartakusbund). It was unable to attract new members and its membership peaked in the last years of the Weimar Republic with 35,000 and 50,000 members. However, those who did join were commonly children of communist parents that were extremely devoted to the Communist Party.

Their activities included selling party newspapers, painting slogans, gluing posters, collecting dues and taking part in agitation. They also made up the voice choruses for Communist songs at demonstrations and other events. The KJVD had its own publishing house, the "Young Guard". The KJVD followed the Communist Party propaganda of attacking the Social Democratic Party of Germany as a proponent of "social fascism" resulting in hostility toward the Social Democrats becoming a feature of the KJVD.

Political rifts between the KJVD and its parent organization, the Communist Party, appeared, including support by members of the KJVD for the young Communist intellectual Heinz Neumann who advocated increased use of physical violence against political enemies, including the Nazis.

The future leader of East Germany, Erich Honecker was a member of the KJVD and became the KJVD leader of Saarland in 1931.

After the majority of the Independent Social Democratic Party of Germany joined the Communist Party of Germany at the end of 1920, the Independents' Socialist Workers Youth group followed suit and merged with the Communist Party's youth organization which in 1925, became known as the Young Communists League.

The central organ of KJVD was Die Arbeit, which was published illegally.

== Legacy ==
In 2002 the KPD (1990) established their youth organisation, also calling it the KJVD.

== Leadership ==
List of Chairmen of the KJVD
No.	Portrait	Name	Term of office		
No.	Portrait	Name	Took office	Left office	Time in office
1	Richard Gyptner	Richard Gyptner	12 September 1920	10 April 1924	3 years, 6 months, 29 days
2	Hermann Jacobs	Hermann Jacobs	10 April 1924	22 May 1925	1 year, 1 month, 12 days
3	Conrad Blenkle	Conrad Blenkle	22 May 1925	11 November 1928	3 years, 5 months, 20 days
4	Walter Häbich	Walter Häbich	11 November 1928	c. 12 June 1929	c. 7 months, 1 day
5	Kurt Müller	Kurt Müller	c. 12 June 1929	June 1931	c. 2 years
6	Artur Becker	Artur Becker	June 1931	February 1932	8 months
7	Alfred Hiller	Alfred Hiller	February 1932	October 1932	8 months
8	Fritz Große	Fritz Große	October 1932	August 1934	1 year, 10 months
9	Gabo Lewin	Gabo Lewin	August 1934	February 1935	6 months

== See also ==
- Young Communist League of Germany (Opposition)
