= Roberta Gropper =

German political activist (1897–1993)

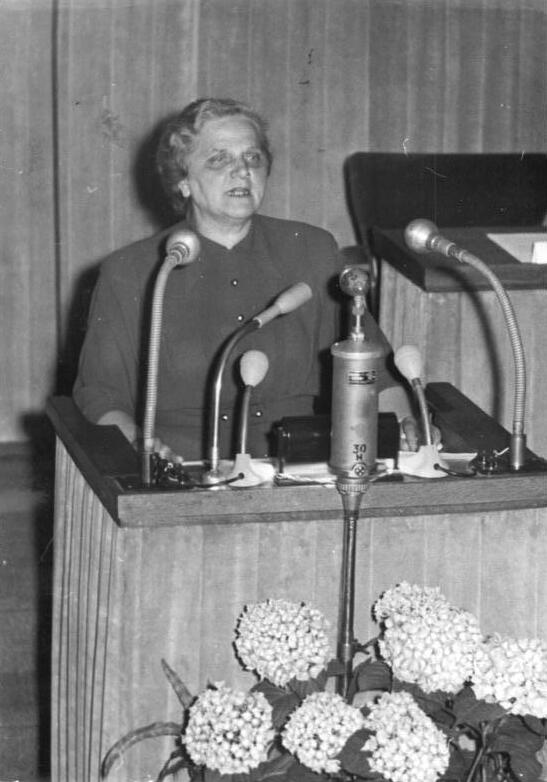
- Roberta Gropper addressing the Volkskammer

Member of the Volkskammer
- In office 1950–1981
- Parliamentary group: DFD
- Constituency: Berlin

Member of the Reichstag
- In office 1930 – July 1932
- Parliamentary group: KPD
- Constituency: Berlin

Personal details
- Born: August 16, 1897 Memmingen, German Empire
- Died: February 1, 1993 (aged 95) Berlin, Germany
- Party: USPD (1917–1919); KPD (1919–1946); SED (1946–1989)
- Spouse: Paul Langner (d. 1935)
- Occupation: Political activist, cigarette factory worker
- Awards: Order of Karl Marx (1962); Patriotic Order of Merit in Gold (1967)

Roberta Gropper (16 August 1897 - 1 February 1993) was a German Communist political activist who became a member of the Reichstag (national parliament) in 1930. In 1934 she fled to the Soviet Union where she fell victim to party factionalism and spent more than three years in a concentration camp: this was followed by a Siberian exile. She was able to return to Berlin in 1947 and became a mainstream politician in the German Democratic Republic (East Germany).

== Life ==
=== Early years ===
Roberta Gropper was born in Memmingen, a mid-sized town in the hills to the south of Ulm. Her father was a weaver. In 1905 the family moved to Ulm, and it was here than between 1911 and 1924 Roberta Gropper was employed in a cigarette factory. In 1915 she joined a worker's youth (Arbeiterjugend) organisation, and became a member of a trades union in 1918. She was 20 in 1917, when the Social Democratic Party split, largely because of disagreements in respect of support for the government over the war, and she joined the breakaway Independent Social Democratic Party (Unabhängige Sozialdemokratische Partei Deutschlands / USPD). In the revolutionary turmoil that followed the end of the war she was a member of the Workers' council in Ulm. In 1919 Gropper was a founder member of the local Communist party in Ulm.

=== Communist activism ===
In 1924 she became treasurer and in 1925 leader of the women's section of the party regional leadership team (Bezirksleitung) for the Württemberg party, based in Stuttgart. It was here that she got to know the editor in chief of the "Workers' Newspaper" (Arbeiterzeitung), Paul Langner, whom she later married. In 1927 she attended, as a Württemberg delegate, the Eleventh Party Congress, held that year in Essen. At the end of 1927, with her husband, she moved to Mannheim, joining the party's regional leadership team for the Rhenish Palatinate. She worked as leader of the women's section and as a typist. The two of them then moved again, in Autumn 1928, to Gleiwitz in the Upper Silesia region, where they undertook equivalent party responsibilities. In June 1929 she moved to Berlin, working as a typist in the large permanent Soviet Trade Delegation and in the Information Department of the German Communist Party. In the summer of 1930 she became head of the women's section for the regional leadership team in Berlin-Brandenburg, after which she headed up the Women's Section of the Party Central Committee till June 1932. The period was one of continuing factionalism within the German Communist Party, which directly mirrored the power struggle that had been unfolding in Moscow during which Stalin was able to remove opponents from positions of influence. In Berlin Gropper was released from her party duties because she was a member of the Neumann-Remmele faction, which had opposed the pro-Stalin elements in the party. She continued to work as an instructor for the Party Central Committee, however.

Along with her party work, between 1930 and July 1932 she represented her Berlin electoral district in the Reichstag (national legislature). The political backdrop changed dramatically in January 1933 when the Nazis took power and converted Germany into a one-party dictatorship. Political activity (except in support of the Nazi party) became illegal. Her husband was arrested on 1 March 1933, and spent the next year or so in "protective custody". Roberta Gropper continued to work, now illegally, for the Communist Party in Germany till May 1934, when she emigrated to Paris, using the cover name "Paula Brenner". By February 1935, travelling via Stockholm and Copenhagen, she had reached the Soviet Union, joining her husband who had been there since August 1934.

=== Moscow ===
In Moscow Gropper worked for the Workers International Relief (Internationale Arbeiterhilfe) welfare organisation. She received a further blow, however, in May 1935 when her husband died. For a period after this Roberta Gropper was without work. She then took work as a contributing editor. However, in November 1937 she was arrested by the NKVD and sentenced to three and a half years in a concentration camp. Frequent politically motivated arrests were a feature of life in Moscow at this time. Gropper's crime was membership of an "anti-Soviet grouping". This referred to her association five years earlier with Neumann and Remmele which was newly relevant since they, too, had ended up as political refugees in Moscow where they fell victim to the dictator's paranoia. (Hermann Neumann was sentenced to death and shot on 26 November 1937: Hermann Remmele would meet the same fate on 7 March 1939.) One of Gropper's fellow internees in the concentration camp was a comrade from the past, Margarete Buber-Neumann, now a widow, who also survived the camp experience, and later wrote a memoire of life in the camp entitled Als Gefangene bei Stalin und Hitler ("As prisoners of Stalin and Hitler"). The book contains an interesting insight involving Gropper, who was asked by her friend whether they should tell people abroad what was going on in the Soviet Union once they were released. Gropper replied that it was their duty not to do that: "you should on no account rob the workers of their illusions nor of their hope!" ("...das unsere Pflicht sei«, sagte Gropper: »Um Gottes willen, tue das nicht! Du darfst den Arbeitern nicht ihre Illusionen, nicht ihre Hoffnung rauben!«").

=== Internal exile ===
By the time she was released, the Soviet Union and Germany were at war, although until June 1941 the two governments considered themselves, at least officially, to be on the same side. On her release, Roberta Gropper took work as a proofreader with the "Red Flag" newspaper in the Volga German Autonomous Soviet Socialist Republic. However, shortly after this the German army invaded the Soviet Union. The Volga Autonomous Republic was "formally extinguished" in September 1941, which was also the month in which Gropper, like thousands of members of the German-speaking ethnic minority in the territory, was "formally banned". For the next six years she survived in Siberia, supporting herself with domestic work and dress making.

=== Soviet occupation zone ===
She returned to Berlin in 1947. War had ended in May 1945, and a large part of what had been central Germany was being administered as the Soviet occupation zone. Gropper lost no time in joining the recently formed Socialist Unity Party (Sozialistische Einheitspartei Deutschlands / SED), which was well on its way to becoming the ruling party in a new kind of German one-party dictatorship. She took a post as an instructor in the Women's Department of the "Parteivorstand" (precursor to the powerful Party Central Committee). She was promoted in 1949 to the post of party "Women's Secretary" for the important Greater Berlin district.

=== German Democratic Republic ===
1949 was also the year in which the Soviet occupation zone was relaunched, formally in October, as the Soviet sponsored German Democratic Republic, a separated German state with its political institutions consciously modeled on those of the Soviet Union. Between 1949 and 1952 Roberta Gropper served as the Berlin area chair of the Berlin region Democratic Women's League (Demokratischer Frauenbund Deutschlands / DFD). The DFD was an officially mandated "mass organisation" which, under the Leninist constitutional structure being applied, would receive a predetermined fixed quota of seats in the National parliament (Volkskammer). It was not as a representative of the SED (party) but as the Berlin representative of the DFD that between 1950 and 1981 Roberta Gropper sat as a member of the Volkskammer. In addition, for many years she held a senior political position within the Berlin region Trades Union Federation. She was also reported in 1962 chairing the commission on Social Security.

She died in Berlin on 1 February 1993.

== Awards and honours ==
- 1958 Patriotic Order of Merit in silver
- 1962 Order of Karl Marx
- 1967 Patriotic Order of Merit in gold
