= Moshe Berent =

Israeli political scientist

- משה ברנט
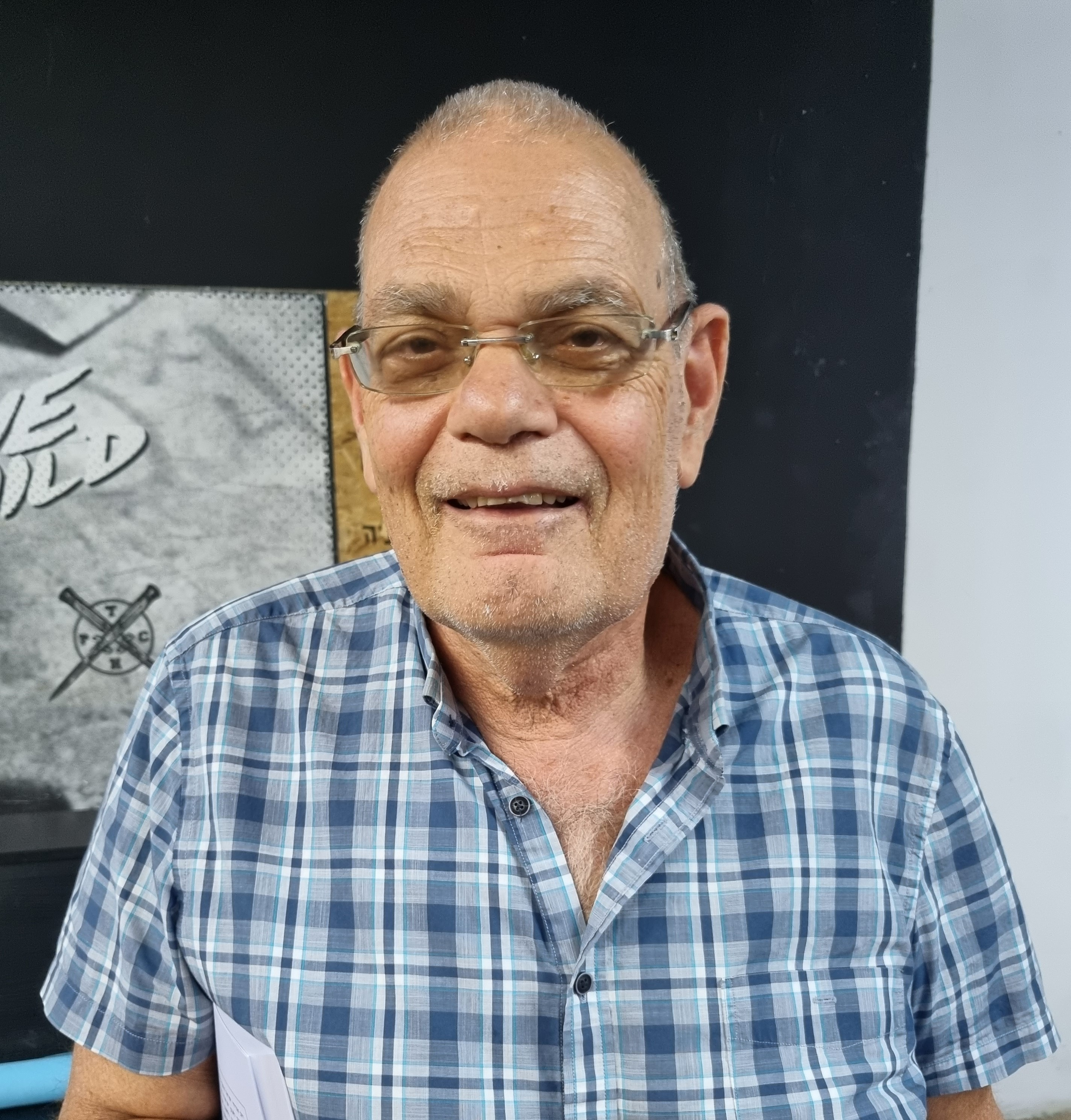
- Born: February 2, 1954 (age 72)
- Citizenship: Israel
- Education: Technion, Tel Aviv University, University of Cambridge
- Known for: Israeli National Identity research, Ancient Greece research
- Scientific career
- Fields: Political Science, Sociology
- Workplaces: Open University of Israel
- Academic advisors: Ernest Gellner

Moshe Berent (Hebrew: משה ברנט; born February 2, 1954) is a former Lecturer (retired) in the Department of Sociology, Political Science and Communication at the Open University of Israel.

== Education ==
Berent received a Bachelor's Degree in Electrical Engineering from Technion in Haifa, Master's Degree in Philosophy under Prof. Joseph Agassi at Tel Aviv University, and a Ph.D. in Comparative Political History from the University of Cambridge. Berent's mentors include the sociologist and researcher of nationalism Ernest Gellner.

Berent's research interests include Ancient Greece and Israeli national identity.

== Books ==
- Moshe Berent, Joseph Agassi, Judith Buber Agassi, Israeli National Consciousness, Pinchas Sapir Development Center, 1988.
- Moshe Berent, Joseph Agassi, Judith Buber Agassi, Who is an Israelite, Kivunim, 1991.
- Moshe Berent, A Nation Like All Nations: Towards the Establishment of an Israeli Republic, Israel Academic Press 2015 (translated from the 2009 Hebrew edition by Carmel Publishing House).
- Moshe Berent, The Jewish Cause: An Introduction to a Different Israeli History, Carmel Publishing, 2019.

== Articles ==
- Moshe Berent, Conscription of Arabs in the Army as a National Interest, on the Open University website, 2012.
- Stateless Polis: A Response to Criticism Social Evolution and History, Volume 5, Number 1. March 2006, pp. 141–163
- Greece: a polis without a state, in The Early State: Its Alternatives and Analogues, edited by Leonid E. Grinin et al. (Volgograd, Russia, 2004) p. 364-387.
- Philosopher of the "State of God" or a communitarian? Review of "Philosophical Theory of the State" and related essays. Bernard Bosanquet, edited by Gerald F. Gaus and William Sweet (Chicago, 2001). European Heritage 9.4 (2004) 533-535
- Consensus Politics and the Modern State (with Keith Sutherland), in Keith Sutherland (Editor), Rape the Constitution? (Torverton, 2000)
- Anthropology and the Classics: War, Violence, and the Stateless Polis, Classical Quarterly 50.1 (2000), 257–289.
- Stasis, or the Greek Invention of Politics History of Political Thought, XIX, 3 (1998), pp. 331–362.
- Stateless polis, towards a new anthropological model of the ancient Greek community.
