= Judith Buber Agassi =

Israeli sociologist

Judith Buber Agassi (Hebrew: יהודית בובר אגסי; 17 June 1924 – 15 July 2018) was a German-born Israeli social scientist, who wrote about women, work and the experience of those imprisoned in Ravensbrück concentration camp. She also edited the work of her mother Margarete Buber-Neumann and her grandfather Martin Buber.

== Life ==
Judith Buber was born in Heppenheim, Germany on 17 June 1924, at the house of her grandparents, Paula and Martin Buber. Her parents, Rafael Buber and his first wife, Margarete, lived there for a year, along with Judith's older sister Barbara. After the couple divorced, Rafael was awarded custody and the girls were raised at their grandparents' home in Heppenheim. She migrated to Jerusalem in March 1938. Margarette later entered into a domestic partnership with Communist functionary Heinz Neumann.

She was educated at Beth Hakerem High School and the Hebrew University of Jerusalem, graduating in 1951 with an MA in history. In 1949 she married the philosopher Joseph Agassi. She earned her doctorate at the London School of Economics in 1960, with a thesis on local government and parliamentary democracy.

Her mother Margarete Buber-Neumann spent four years as a political prisoner in Ravensbrück concentration camp. Neumann was purged by Stalin in 1937. Judith Buber Agassi spent years interviewing women who had survived the camp, and recovered the identities of over 16,000 prisoners.

== Works ==
- Mass media in Indonesia, 1969
- The characteristics of typical women's jobs and the attitudes of women to those jobs: a comparative multinational study, 1978
- Women on the job: the attitudes of women to their work, 1979 ISBN 978-0-669-02829-4
- Comparing the work attitudes of women and men, 1982 ISBN 978-0-669-04657-1
- The Redesign of working time: promise or threat?, 1989
- (ed.) Plädoyer für Freiheit und Menschlichkeit: Vorträge aus 35 Jahren by Margarete Buber-Neumann, 1999
- (ed.) Martin Buber on psychology and psychotherapy: essays, letters, and dialogue by Martin Buber, 1999
- The Jewish women prisoners of Ravensbrück: who were they?, 2006
- (ed.) Schriften zur Psychologie und Psychotherapie by Martin Buber, 2008
- The Jewish women prisoners of Ravensbruck: who were they?, 2012
