= Margarete Buber-Neumann =

German writer (1901–1989)

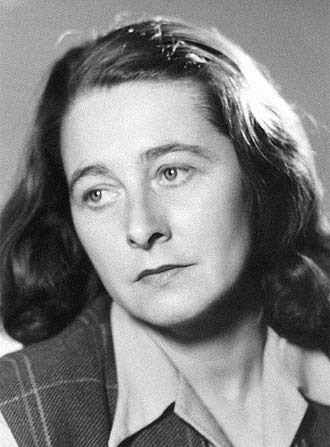
- Buber-Neumann, c. 1930
- Born: Margarete Thüring; 21 October 1901; Potsdam, Kingdom of Prussia, German Empire
- Died: 6 November 1989 (aged 88); Frankfurt am Main, West Germany
- Other names: Grete Buber; Greta Buber-Neumann; Margarete Buber; Margaret Buber Neumann
- Citizenship: West Germany
- Occupation: Writer
- Years active: 1921–1978
- Known for: Witness to concentration camps in Nazi Germany and Stalinist USSR during WWII
- Notable work: Under Two Dictators (1949)
- Political party: KPD (1926–1937), CDU (1975–1988)
- Spouse(s): Rafael Buber, Helmuth Faust
- Partner: Heinz Neumann
- Children: Barbara Goldschmidt and Judith Buber Agassi
- Relatives: Martin Buber (father in-law)
- Awards: Bundesverdienstkreuz (1980)

Margarete Buber-Neumann (née Thüring; 21 October 1901 – 6 November 1989) was a German writer. As a senior Communist Party of Germany member and Gulag survivor, she was turned into a staunch anti-communist. She wrote the famous memoir Under Two Dictators, which begins with her arrest in Moscow during Joseph Stalin's Great Purge, followed by her imprisonment as a political prisoner in both the Soviet Gulag and the Nazi concentration camp system, after she was handed over by the NKVD to the Gestapo during World War II.

Buber-Neumann was also known for having testified in the so-called "Trial of the Century" about the Kravchenko Affair in France. In 1980, she was awarded the Great Cross of Merit of West Germany.

== Background ==
Margarete Thüring was born on 21 October 1901, in Potsdam, German Empire. Her father, Heinrich Thüring (1866–1942), was a master brewer; her mother was Else Merten (1871–1960). She had four siblings: Lisette (known as "Babette"), Gertrud ("Trude"), and two brothers, Heinrich and Hans. (Note: In 1920, Buber-Neumann's sister, Babette Thüring, had married Fritz Gross of Vienna, who moved to Germany after World War I and became a member of the Comminst Party of Germany. They had a son in 1923 and separated. Babette retained her married name of "Babette Gross" for the rest of her life. (Fritz Gross moved to England in the 1930s, helped refugees during World War II and died in 1946 with a considerable corpus of mostly-unpublished work.) Gross then became the common-law spouse of Willi Münzenberg. Koestler would remain a friend after both he and Buber-Neumann had left the party. As "Babette Gross", Buber-Neuman's sister later wrote a biography of Münzenberg.) She disliked the militarism of German culture in her youth and the way that her father was awe-struck by officers of Potsdam's large Imperial German Army garrison. He was a "tyrant" while her mother was "well-read and liberal."

== Education and activism ==
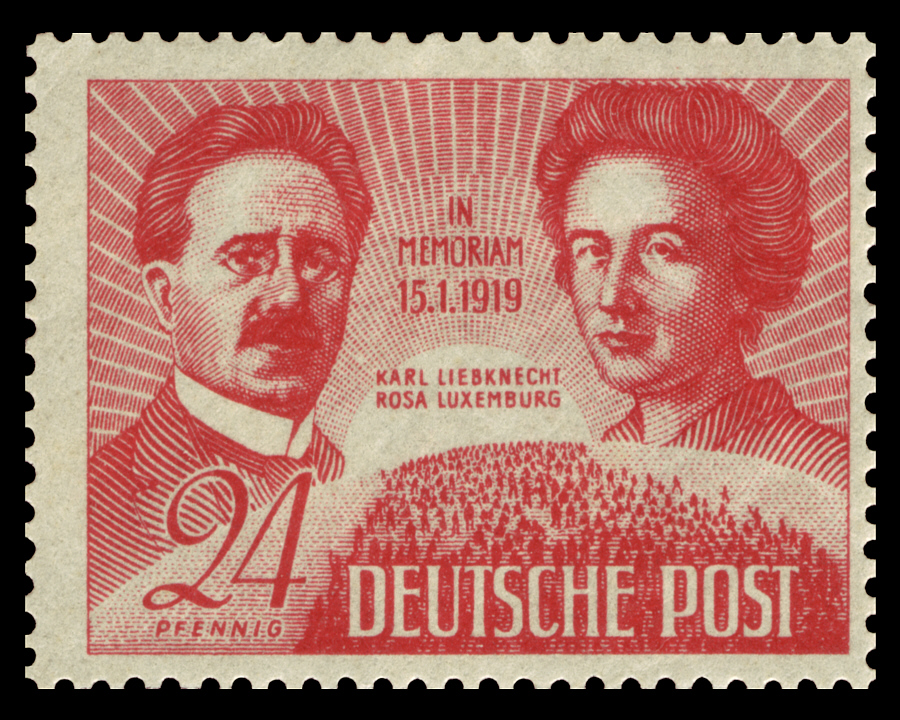
East German stamp of 1949 commemorating the murders of Karl Liebknecht and Rosa Luxemburg.

In 1919, Buber-Neumann enrolled at Pestalozzi-Fröbel Haus in Berlin to learn to teach kindergarten. In 1921, she attended a memorial for Karl Liebknecht and Rosa Luxemburg. She sought to become a member of groups of kindred spirits to fight injustice.

Also in 1921, she joined the Socialist Youth League of Germany. In 1926, she joined the Communist Party of Germany. Buber-Neumann developed an interest in literature and Expressionist paintings.

== Personal life ==
In 1921 or 1922, Margarete Thüring married Rafael Buber, the communist son of the philosopher Martin Buber with whom she had two daughters: Barbara and Judith. She lived on Babelsberger Strasse, where she took in communists like the Dimitroff couple, who were evading police.

Following her divorce in 1929, she lived in an unmarried union with Heinz Neumann, the Comintern representative to Germany. He criticized Stalin's German policy in the 1930s, which led to his arrest and execution in the Great Purge. She married Helmuth Faust after she went to live in Frankfurt am Main; they divorced.

Her daughters lived with her and then with their paternal grandparents. Because they were part Jewish, they left Nazi-controlled Europe for Palestine.

== Career ==
She obtained a job as an editor for Inprecor, the International Press Correspondence. (Note: Inprecor is a contraction of International Press Correspondence.) In 1931 and 1932, the Neumanns visited the Soviet Union twice and then Spain, where they reorganized the Spanish Communist Party. In November 1933, Neumann received a recall from Moscow but instead left for Zürich, Switzerland. They were both deported to the Soviet Union in June 1935. They were watched by guards during their stay at the Hotel Lux, in Moscow, (Note: DNB states that she and Neumann moved emigrated to the Soviet Union in May 1935.) where they worked as translators.

== Internment ==
Map of Soviet Gulag prison camps (1923–1961)

On 27 April 1937, while living at Moscow's Hotel Lux, Heinz Neumann was arrested as part of Joseph Stalin's Great Purge. Buber-Neumann never learned in her lifetime that her husband was executed on 26 November 1937. On 19 June 1938, she was arrested for "counter-revolutionary organization and agitation against the Soviet state". She was held at the Lubianka Prison, then at Butyrka Prison, and was sent to labour camps in Karaganda and then in Burma, both in Kazakhstan.

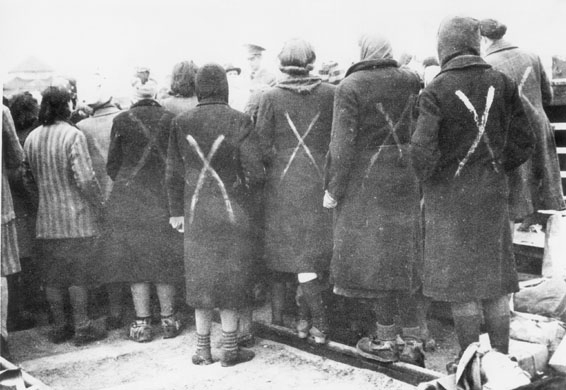
Surviving female prisoners gathered when the Red Cross arrived at Ravensbrück (April 1945)

In February 1940, she was handed over to the Gestapo, as part of the NKVD-Gestapo co-operation that was initiated by the Stalin-Hitler Pact (Molotov–Ribbentrop Pact). She was sent to Germany, along with some other Soviet political prisoners, including Betty Olberg, a wife of a German communist who was executed in 1936. (Note: In the transit in Moscow on her way to Germany, she met Carola Neher. They were to be transferred to Germany together, but for unknown reasons, Neher was turned back to the Gulag, where she died in 1942.) During the train ride, she had not known the plans and was crestfallen when she learned that she was not being freed.

She was then detained with other "political prisoners" in Ravensbrück concentration camp, where she became friends with Orli Wald and Milena Jesenská. The conditions were especially inhumane, and many women died of starvation, disease and extermination. She worked long days of forced labour. Buber-Neumann was unpopular with most of the women, as communist inmates, who were influential in the camp, disapproved of her testifying to the hardships that she had endured in the Soviet Union. Her existence improved when she had the companionship of Jesenská.

She later wrote:

The SS had no fabric for the production of new prison clothing. Instead they drove truckloads of coats, dresses, underwear and shoes that had once belonged to those gassed in the east, to Ravensbrück.... The clothes of the people were sorted, and at first crosses were cut out, and fabric of another color sewn underneath. The prisoners walked around like sheep marked for slaughter. The crosses would impede escape. Later they spared themselves this cumbersome procedure and painted with oil paint broad, white crosses on the coats.

— Fånge hos Hitler och Stalin (1949)

Buber-Neumann worked in a clerical capacity in the Siemens plant attached to the camp and later as secretary to a camp official, SS-Oberaufseherin Johanna Langefeld. She remained in the camp until the end of World War II. On April 21, 1945, Buber was released with 60 other women with freedom papers. Seeking to avoid the advancing Soviet troops, she made it to Hanover, Germany, where she sent a telegram to her daughters in Palestine.

== Under Two Dictators ==
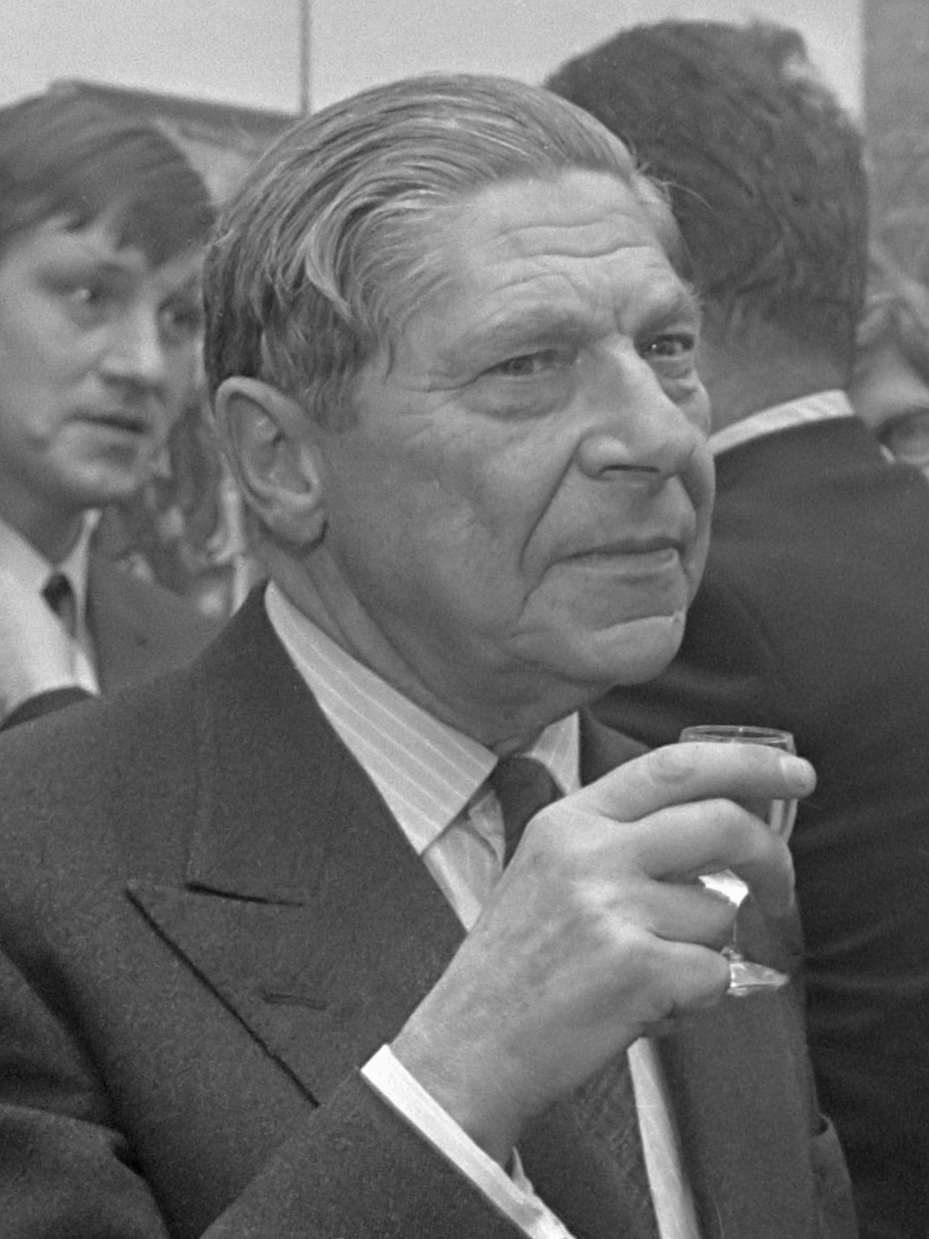
Arthur Koestler urged Buber-Neumann to write her memoir Under Two Dictators (photo from 1969)

After World War II, Buber-Neumann accepted an invitation by the International Rescue and Relief Committee to live in Sweden, where she lived and worked for three years. In 1948, she published Als Gefangene bei Stalin und Hitler (published in German and Swedish and the following year in French and English as Under Two Dictators: Prisoner of Stalin and Hitler) in 1949. At the urging of her friend Arthur Koestler, she gave an account of her years in both Gulags and Nazi concentration camps. Die Gazette said of these works that "they shook up the post-war generation in West Germany because they reported for the first time and in great detail on the camps of the Soviet gulag".

== Kravchenko Affair ==
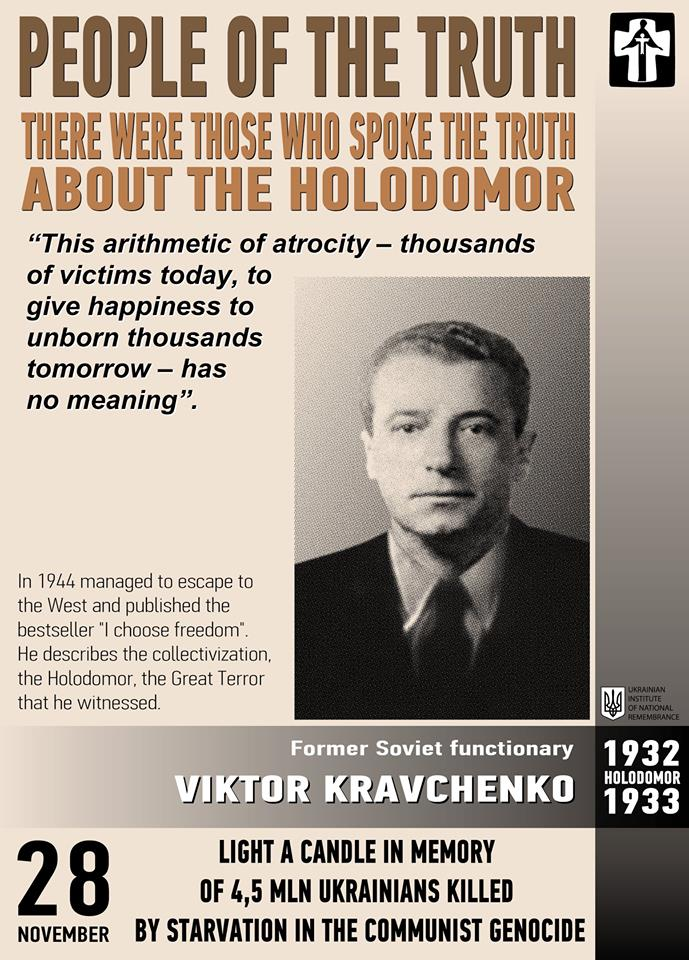
Poster featuring Victor Kravchenko (undated)

On 23 February 1949, Buber-Neumann testified in Paris in support of Victor Kravchenko, a Soviet defector who was suing Les Lettres Françaises, a French magazine connected with the Communist Party of France, for libel after it had accused him of fabricating his account of Soviet labour camps. Buber-Neumann corroborated Kravchenko's account in great detail and so contributed to his victory in the case.

== Anti-communism ==
In 1950, Buber-Neumann returned to Germany and settled in Frankfurt am Main as a staunch anti-communist. She continued to write for the next three decades. She joined the anti-communist Congress for Cultural Freedom with Arthur Koestler, Bertrand Russell, Karl Jaspers, Jacques Maritain, Raymond Aron, A. J. Ayer, Ignazio Silone, Nicola Chiaromonte and Sidney Hook.

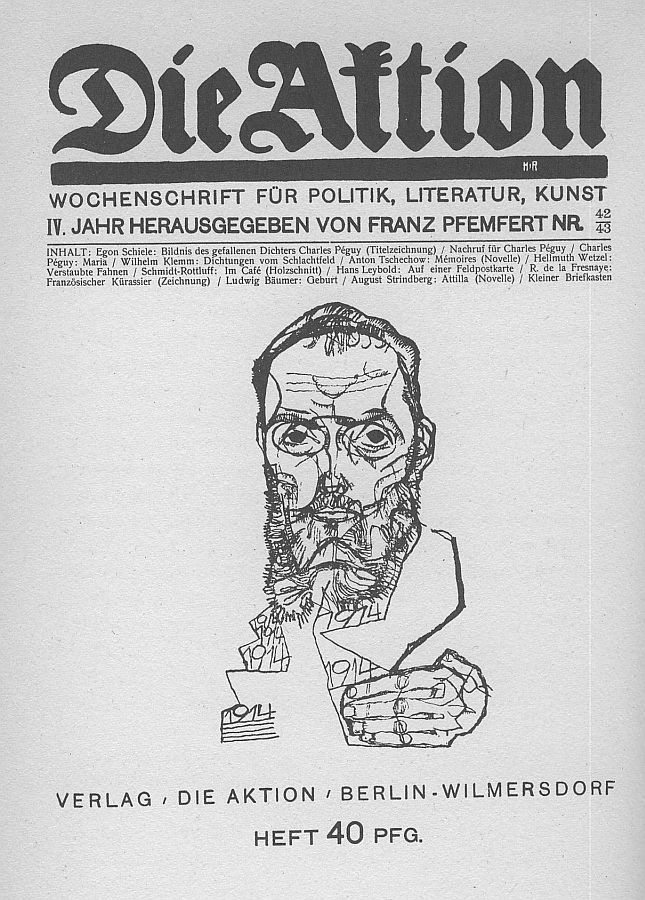
Front page from Die Aktion that portrays Charles Péguy by Egon Schiele (October 1914)

In 1951, she became editor of the political journal Die Aktion. In 1957, she published Von Potsdam nach Moskau: Stationen eines Irrweges ("From Potsdam to Moscow: Stations of an Erring Way"). In 1959, Koestler asked her to join him at his home in Alpbach to meet Whittaker Chambers and his wife, Esther Shemitz, while they were visiting Europe. On 24 June 1959, Chambers wrote in a letter:

Then K had the idea to wire Greta Buber-Neumann: 'Komme schleunigst. Gute Weine. Außerdem, Whittaker C.'... There we sat and talked, not merely about the experiences of our life... We realized that, of our particular breed, the old activists, we are almost the only survivors – the old activists who were articulate, consequent revolutionists, and not merely agents.

In 1963, she published a biography of her Ravensbrück friend Milena Jesenská Kafkas Freundin Milena. In 1976, she published Die erloschene Flamme: Schicksale meiner Zeit (The Extinct Flame: Fates of My Time) in which she argued that Nazism and communism are practically the same.

Regarding Communism and Nazism, Buber-Neumann wrote:

Between the misdeeds of Hitler and those of Stalin, in my opinion, there exists only a quantitative difference.... I don't know if the Communist idea, if its theory, already contained a basic fault or if only the Soviet practice under Stalin betrayed the original idea and established in the Soviet Union a kind of Fascism.

— Under Two Dictators

== Later years and death ==
Buber-Neumann became a political conservative and joined the Christian Democratic Union (CDU) in 1975. In 1980, Buber-Neumann received the Great Cross of Merit of the Federal Republic of Germany. She died at age 88 on November 6, 1989, in Frankfurt am Main, three days before the fall of the Berlin Wall.

== Legacy ==
The poet Adeline Baldacchino wrote:

Margarete Buber-Neumann had the sad privilege to span the 20th century as the only person to have testified publicly in writing about the experience of both Soviet and Nazi camps. The young and fervent communist, accused of "deviationism" by Stalinist powers, survived three years of the Siberian Gulag only to be deported to Ravensbrück after the German-Soviet pact for five years. She would survive to tell, tirelessly, without bitterness and without illusions, what power does to those who hold it and to those whom it holds. (Note: Original quote: "Margarete Buber-Neumann traverse le XXe siècle avec un bien triste privilège : elle est la seule à avoir publiquement témoigné par écrit de sa double expérience des camps soviétiques et nazis. La jeune et fervente communiste, accusée de « déviationnisme » par le pouvoir stalinien, survit à trois ans de Goulag sibérien pour se retrouver déportée à Ravensbrück après le pacte germano-soviétique, pendant cinq ans. Elle survivra pour raconter, inlassablement, sans amertume et sans illusions, ce que le pouvoir fait de ceux qui le détiennent et à ceux qu’il détient.")

The historian Tony Judt called her among "the most interesting political writers, social commentators, or public moralists of the age" in a list that includes Émile Zola, Václav Havel, Karl Kraus, Alva Myrdal, and Sidney Hook. Judt wrote that she had written one of the best accounts by an ex-communist and listed her among Albert Camus, Ignazio Silone, Manès Sperber, Arthur Koestler, Jorge Semprún, Wolfgang Leonhard and Claude Roy.

The writer Camila Loew chose Buber-Neumann along with Ruth Klüger, Marguerite Duras and Charlotte Delbo as "main witnesses" to "reflect on the relationship between history and literature, or between the materiality of pain (the experience of [the] body) and its representation in text."

== Works ==
Her works have been translated into many languages.

- Fånge hos Hitler och Stalin: Als Gefangene bei Stalin und Hitler. Natur och kultur. 1948. LCCN 50027706.
  - Als Gefangene bei Stalin und Hitler. Verlag der Zwölf. 1948. LCCN 49029725.
  - Déportée en Sibérie. Baconnière. 1949. LCCN 50015683.
  - Under Two Dictators. Gollancz (UK), Dodd, Mead & Company (US). 1949. LCCN 49006527.
- Von Potsdam nach Moskau: Stationen eines Irrweges (1957)
- Kafkas Freundin Milena – Mistress to Kafka: the life and death of Milena; introduction by Arthur Koestler (1966)
  - Milena: The Tragic Story of Kafka's Great Love. Arcade. Archived from the original on 13 May 2018.
- Kommunistische Untergrund. Ein Beitrag zur Geschichte der kommunistischen Geheimarbeit (1970)
- Dokumentation einer Manipulation (1972)
- Freiheit, du bist wieder mein ...: d. Kraft zu überleben (1978)
- Plädoyer für Freiheit und Menschlichkeit: Vorträge aus 35 Jahren – Janine Platten und Judith Buber Agassi (2000)
