= Albert Kuntz =

German goldsmith, soldier, communist, and concentration-camp victim

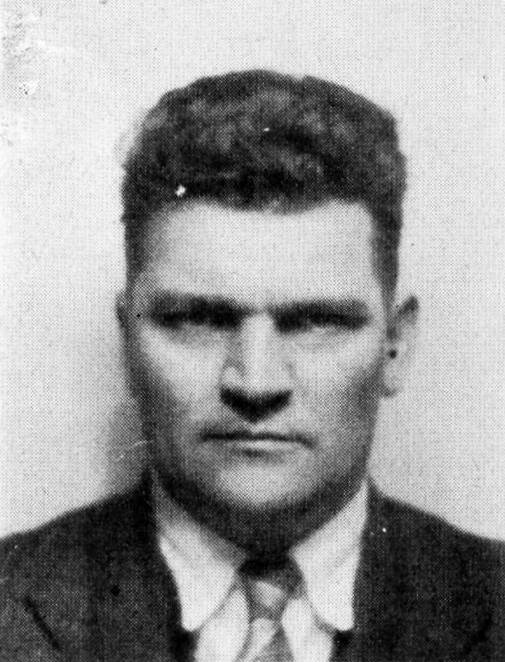
- Kuntz c. 1932

Member of the Landtag of Prussia for Potsdam I
- In office 25 May 1932 – 31 March 1933
- Preceded by: Multi-member district
- Succeeded by: Constituency abolished

Personal details
- Born: 4 December 1896 Bennewitz bei Wurzen, Kingdom of Saxony, German Empire
- Died: 22 January 1945 (aged 48) Mittelbau-Dora concentration camp, Thuringia, Nazi Germany
- Party: USPD (before 1919); KPD (after 1919)

Military service
- Allegiance: German Empire
- Branch/service: Imperial German Army
- Years of service: 1916–1918
- Battles/wars: World War I
- Central institution membership: 1929–1933: Candidate member, KPD Central Committee; Other offices held: 1930–1932: Organizational Leader, Berlin-Brandenberg KPD; 1928–1930, 1932–1933: Political Leader, Hesse-Frankfurt KPD; 1926–1928: Organizational Leader, Hesse-Frankfurt KPD; 1923–1925: Organizational Leader, West Saxony KPD

Albert Kuntz (4 December 1896 – 22 January 1945) was a German goldsmith, soldier, communist and concentration camp victim. A soldier in the First World War, Kuntz rose to become an elected representative of the Communist Party of Germany in the Prussian Landtag. In 1933 he was arrested by the Gestapo, and sent to a succession of prisons and concentration camps. He died in January 1945 at the Mittelbau-Dora concentration camp, where he had been organizing the sabotage of the V-2 rocket production line. Following his death, he was revered as an anti-fascist hero in East Germany.

== Early life ==
Born in Bennewitz in 1896, Kuntz' first profession was as a goldsmith. In 1916 he enlisted in the German army, fighting at the front, where he was wounded. Following this he joined the German Socialist Party, and then the Communist Party of Germany (KPD) in 1919.

== Communist Party ==
In 1919 he co-founded a local group of the KPD in Wurzen, and became a city councillor there in 1921.

In 1923 he became a full-time KPD functionary in Leipzig, as the organizational manager for west Saxony. In 1924 he was sentenced to eight months' imprisonment for violating the peace, which was later suspended. After working in Chemnitz in 1925–26, he went in 1926 as a functionary to the KPD district leadership in Hesse-Frankfurt. In October 1928 he took over the leadership of the Hesse-Frankfurt district as political leader.

In 1929 he was appointed a candidate member of the Central Committee, which sent him to the International Lenin School in Moscow in 1930. After a nine-month stay there, in late 1930 he became organizational leader of the Berlin-Brandenburg district leadership of the KPD, serving in that position until his dismissal in 1932 for supporting Heinz Neumann in challenging party leader Ernst Thälmann. In April of the same year Kuntz was elected to the Prussian Landtag, the parliament of the Free State of Prussia. From June 1932 until his arrest in 1933, he worked as the political leader of the Hesse-Frankfurt party district.

== Imprisonment and death ==
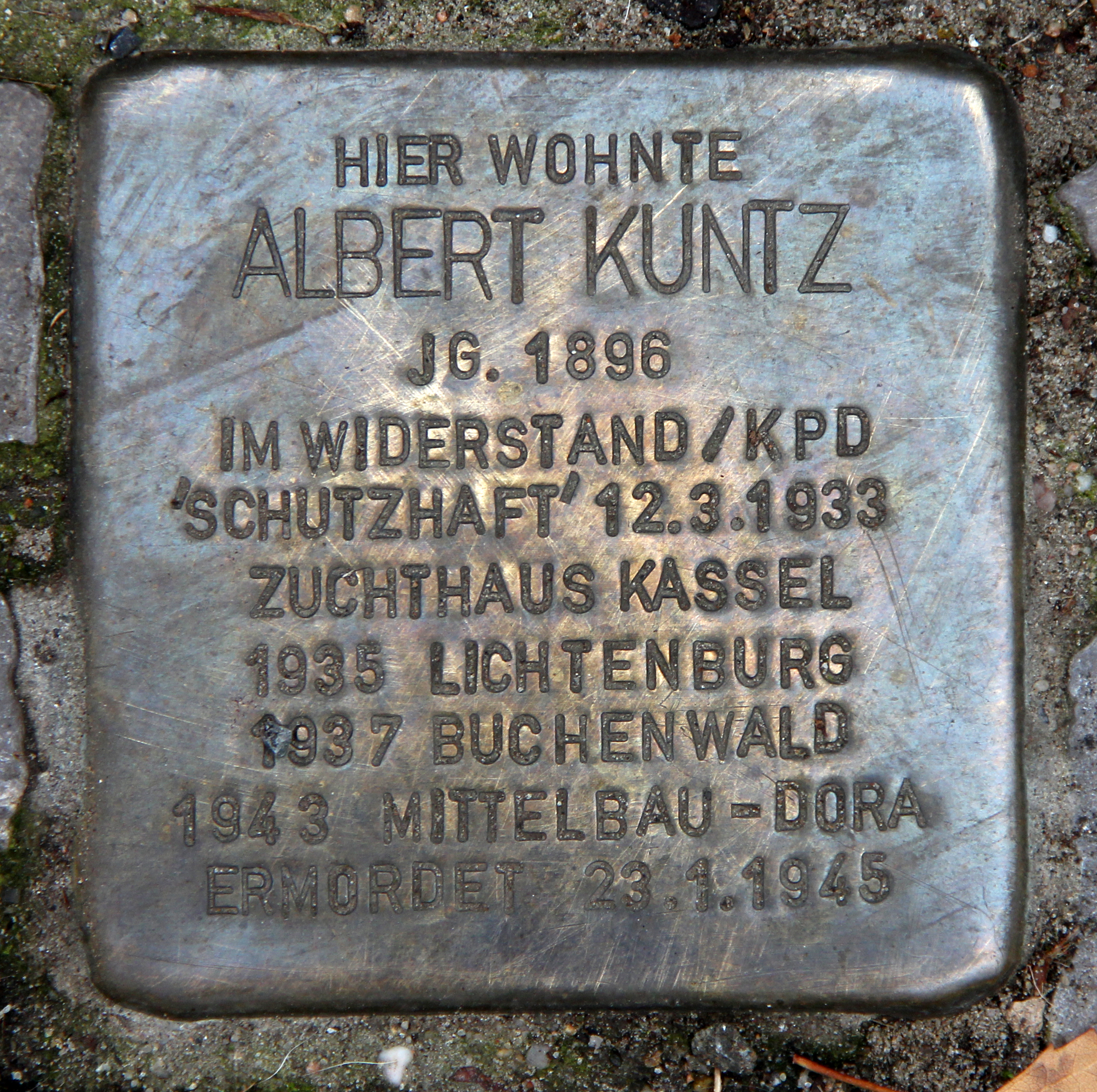
Stolperstein at Kuntz' residence, Afrikanische Str 140, Wedding, Berlin.

Kuntz was arrested on 12 March 1933 by the Gestapo, who attempted to prosecute him for the deaths of German officers. At the time of his arrest, Kuntz was living at Afrikanische Straße 140 in Berlin-Wedding, according to a stolperstein installed there. He was sentenced to three years in prison. From 1933 to 1935 he was held in the Kassel prison.

From 1935 to 1937, he was held in the Lichtenburg concentration camp. At each of the concentration camps where he was held, he was used by the camp administration to organize construction activities. At Lichtenberg, he worked on the construction of heating and bathing systems. From 1937 to 1943, he was a prisoner of the Buchenwald concentration camp. There, he became the responsible person for irrigation and drainage. At both camps, he organized secret meetings of the Communist party, together with Theodor Neubauer and Walter Stoecker.

In 1943 he was moved from Buchenwald to the nearby Mittelbau-Dora concentration camp, where he would stay until his death in 1945. As a prisoner he was a bauleiter, or construction supervisor, under the direction of the camp Nazi commandant SS-Sturmbannführer Otto Förschner. A political prisoner, he wore the red triangle badge to signify this status. While at Dora-Mittelbau, he organized a group to sabotage the V-2 rockets that were being produced in underground galleries at the camp.

In December 1944 the Mittelbau-Dora guards began a round up of suspected saboteurs. Kuntz was interrogated and tortured; he died on the night of 22–23 January 1945 in his cell there. According to Buchenwald Memorial, he was "found hanged in his cell" but "the exact circumstances of his death were never clarified".

== Legacy ==
As a communist leader presumed to have been murdered by the Nazis, Kuntz was highly regarded in communist East Germany, where children were taught to revere Kuntz as an anti-fascist resistance fighter and hero. A memorial to his death was erected at Station Square, Nordhausen at the end of 1946. His name was frequently applied to buildings, streets and schools:

- A school in Nordhausen, the Grundschule Albert Kuntz, bears his name.
- A helicopter squadron, Hubschrauberstaffel 16 Albert Kuntz, was named after him.
- In Berlin, the street Albert-Kuntz-Strasse was named after him.
- The Albert Kuntz Sports Park in Nordhausen is named after him.
- In Havana, Cuba, the cookie factory Fábrica de Galletas Albert Kuntz bearing his name was inaugurated by Che Guevera in 1962.

In 1958, the DDR issued a stamp in his honour.

== Personal life ==
Kuntz was married at the time of his arrest. His wife Ellen, (née Geissler, born 2 February 1898) remained in Berlin during his incarceration. She died on 21 May 1986.

== Bibliography ==
- Wolfgang Kießling: Stark und voller Hoffnung, Leben und Kampf von Albert Kuntz. Berlin 1964.
- Wolfgang Kießling: Albert Kuntz. In: Wurzen 961–1961. Festschrift zur Tausendjahrfeier, Wurzen 1961, S. 120–144.
- Leo Kuntz, Leopoldine Kuntz, Hannelore und Götz Dieckmann (Hrsg.): Albert Kuntz „Liebste Ellen …“ Briefe aus der Nazihaft 1933–1944. Berlin 2005.
- Olaf Mussmann: Albert Kuntz (1896–1945) – heldenhafter Widerstandskämpfer gegen den Nationalsozialismus oder opportunistischer Überlebensstratege.
- Lutz Niethammer (Hrsg.): Der „gesäuberte“ Antifaschismus. Die SED und die roten Kapos von Buchenwald. Berlin 1994, wiederholte Aufl., u. a. Akademie, Berlin 2005.
- Kuntz, Albert. Biographical database (in German)
