= Barbara Goldschmidt =

Israeli painter

- ברברה גולדשמידט
- Born: 1921; Germany
- Died: March 7, 2013 (aged 91–92); Jerusalem, Israel
- Education: Bezalel Academy of Arts and Design
- Occupation: Painter
- Spouse: Zeev Goldschmidt
- Children: Tamar Goldschmidt, Gideon Goldschmidt
- Parent(s): Margarete Buber-Neumann, Rafael Buber
- Relatives: Martin Buber (grandfather) Paula Buber (grandmother)

Barbara Goldschmidt (Hebrew: ברברה גולדשמידט; 1921 - March 7, 2013) was a German-Israeli painter. Born in Germany, she emigrated to Mandatory Palestine in 1938 and attended the Bezalel Academy of Arts and Design. She is the daughter of the communist author Margarete Buber-Neumann and Raphael Buber, and was raised by her paternal grandparents, Martin Buber and Paula Winkler, with whom she lived in Jerusalem with her husband and two children until 1965. She is known for her characteristically bold portraits of women.
