= Martin Buber =

Austrian-Israeli philosopher (1878–1965)

- מרטין בובר
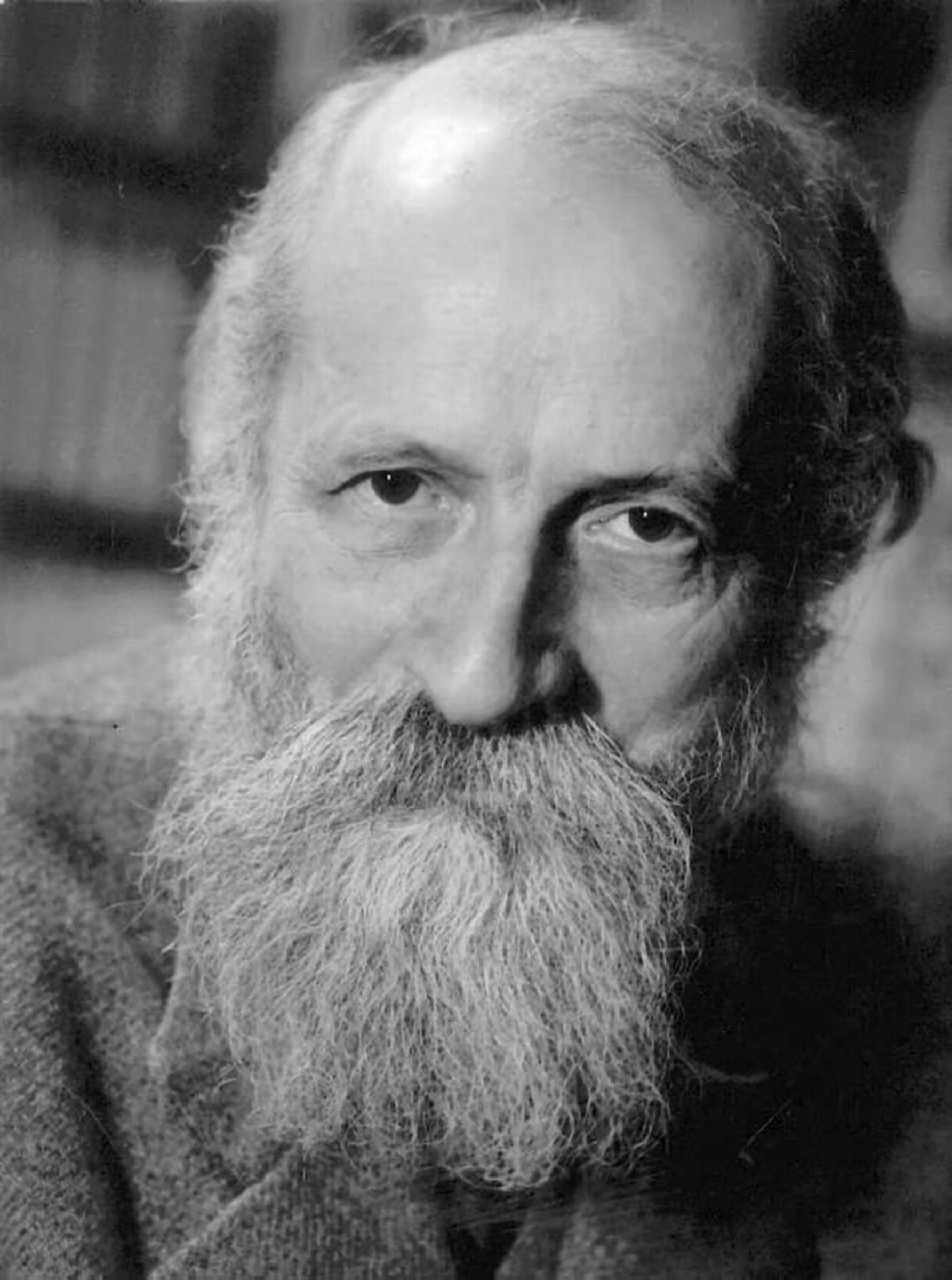
- Born: 8 February 1878; Vienna, Austria-Hungary
- Died: 13 June 1965 (aged 87); Jerusalem, Israel
- Relatives: Judith Buber Agassi

Education
- Education: University of Vienna; University of Leipzig; University of Zurich; University of Berlin
- Academic advisor: Wilhelm Dilthey

Philosophical work
- Era: 20th-century philosophy
- Region: Western philosophy
- School: Continental philosophy Existentialism; Neo-Hasidism
- Institutions: University of Frankfurt am Main; Hebrew University of Jerusalem
- Doctoral students: Shmuel Eisenstadt
- Notable students: Amitai Etzioni
- Main interests: Ontology; philosophical anthropology
- Notable ideas: Ich-Du (I–Thou) and Ich-Es (I–It); Philosophy of dialogue

Signature
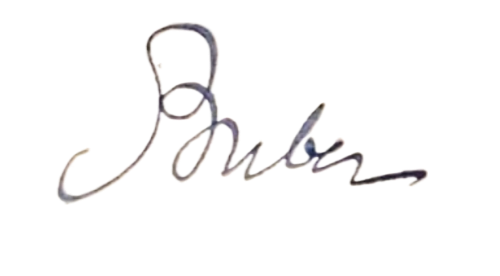

Martin Buber (German: [ˈmaʁtiːn ˈbuːbɐ]; Hebrew: מרטין בובר; Yiddish: מארטין בובער; 8 February 1878 – 13 June 1965) was an Austrian-Israeli philosopher best known for his philosophy of dialogue, a form of existentialism centered on the distinction between the I–Thou relationship and the I–It relationship.

Born in Vienna, Buber came from a family of observant Jews, but broke with Jewish custom to pursue secular studies in philosophy. He produced writings about Zionism and worked with various bodies within the Zionist movement extensively over a nearly 50-year period spanning his time in Europe and the Near East. In 1923, Buber wrote his famous essay on existence, Ich und Du (later translated into English as I and Thou), and in 1925 he began translating the Hebrew Bible into the German language.

He was nominated for the Nobel Prize in Literature ten times, and the Nobel Peace Prize seven times.

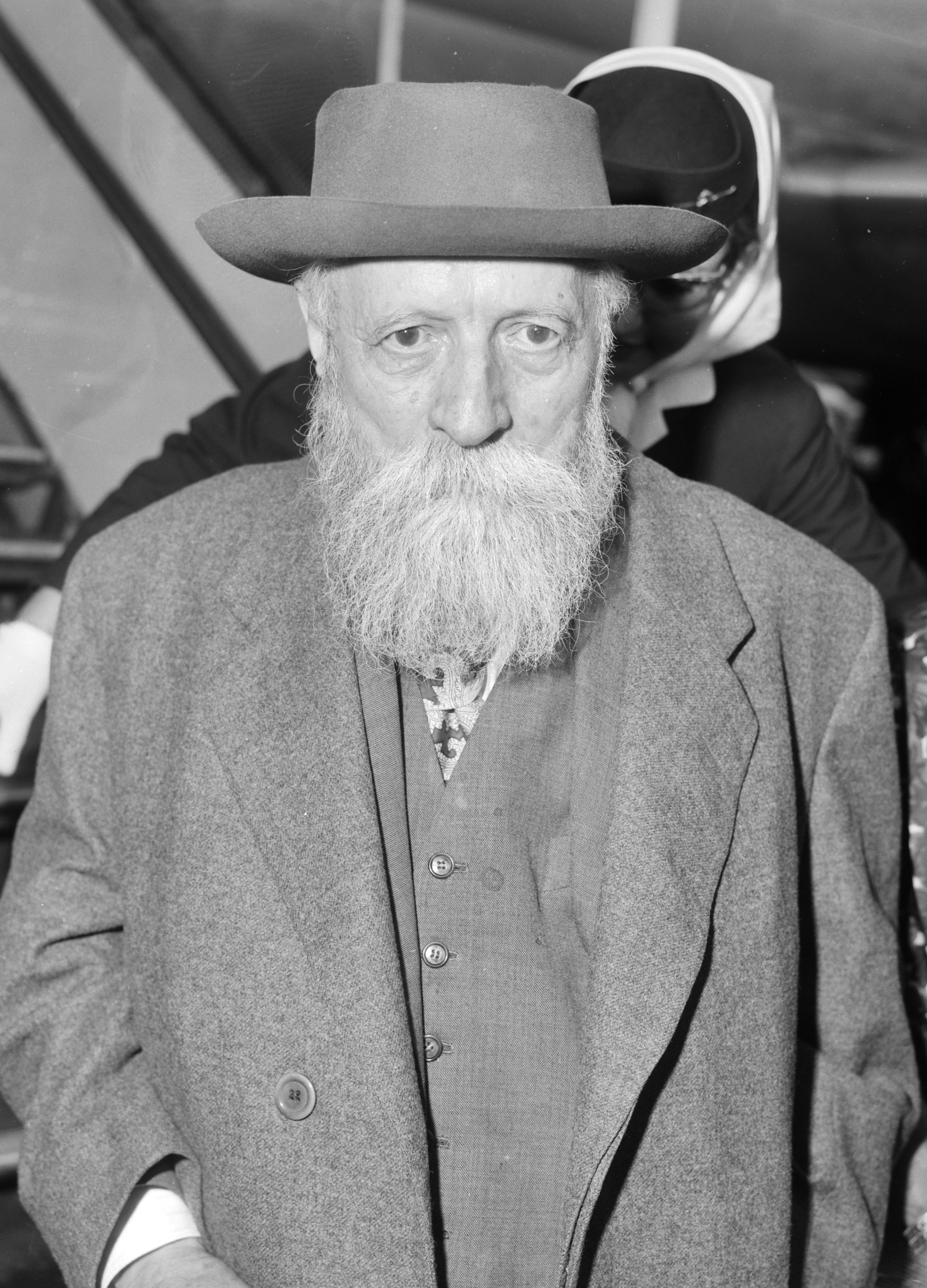
Buber in 1963

== Biography ==
Martin (Hebrew name: מָרְדֳּכַי, Mordechai) Buber was born in Vienna to an Orthodox Jewish family. Buber was a direct descendant of the 16th-century rabbi Meir Katzenellenbogen, known as the Maharam (מהר״ם), the Hebrew acronym for “Morreinu , HaRav (the Rabbi), Meir”, of Padua. Karl Marx is another notable relative. After the divorce of his parents when he was three years old, he was raised by his grandfather in Lemberg (now Lviv in Ukraine). His grandfather, Solomon Buber, was a scholar of Midrash and Rabbinic Literature. At home, Buber spoke Yiddish and German. In 1892, Buber returned to his father's house in Lemberg.

Despite Buber's putative connection to the Davidic line as a descendant of Katzenellenbogen, a personal religious crisis led him to break with Jewish religious customs. He began reading Immanuel Kant, Søren Kierkegaard, and Friedrich Nietzsche. The latter two, in particular, inspired him to pursue studies in philosophy. In 1896, Buber went to study in Vienna (philosophy, art history, German studies, philology).

In 1898, he joined the Zionist movement, participating in congresses and organizational work. In 1899, while studying in Zürich, Buber met his future wife, Paula Winkler, a "brilliant Catholic writer from a Bavarian peasant family" who in 1901 left the Catholic Church and in 1907 converted to Judaism.

Buber, initially, supported and celebrated the Great War as a "world historical mission" for Germany along with Jewish intellectuals to civilize the Near East. Some researchers believe that while in Vienna during and after World War I, he was influenced by the writings of Jacob L. Moreno, particularly the use of the term ‘encounter’.

In 1930, Buber became an honorary professor at the University of Frankfurt am Main, but resigned from his professorship in protest immediately after Adolf Hitler came to power in 1933. He then founded the Central Office for Jewish Adult Education, which became an increasingly important body as the German government forbade Jews from public education. In 1938, Buber left Germany and settled in Jerusalem, Mandatory Palestine, receiving a professorship at Hebrew University and lecturing in anthropology and introductory sociology. In 1947, he was forced to flee his home in Abu Tor, Jerusalem, due to the advance of the Arab Liberation Army. After the creation of the state of Israel in 1948, Buber became the best known Israeli philosopher.

Buber and Paula had two children: a son, Rafael Buber, and a daughter, Eva Strauss-Steinitz. They helped raise their granddaughters Barbara Goldschmidt (1921–2013) and Judith Buber Agassi (1924–2018), born by their son Rafael's marriage to Margarete Buber-Neumann. Buber's wife Paula Winkler died in 1958 in Venice, and he died at his home in the Talbiya neighborhood of Jerusalem on 13 June 1965.

== Major themes ==
Buber's evocative, sometimes poetic, writing style marked the major themes in his work: the retelling of Hasidic and Chinese tales, Biblical commentary, and metaphysical dialogue. A cultural Zionist, Buber was active in the Jewish and educational communities of Germany and Israel. He was also a staunch supporter of a binational solution in Palestine, and, after the establishment of the Jewish state of Israel, of a regional federation of Israel and Arab states. His influence extends across the humanities, particularly in the fields of social psychology, social philosophy, and religious existentialism.

Buber's attitude toward Zionism was tied to his desire to promote a vision of "Hebrew humanism". According to Laurence J. Silberstein, the terminology of "Hebrew humanism" was coined to "distinguish [Buber's] form of nationalism from that of the official Zionist movement" and to point to how "Israel's problem was but a distinct form of the universal human problem. Accordingly, the task of Israel as a distinct nation was inexorably linked to the task of humanity in general".

== Zionist views ==
=== Pre-1915: Early engagement with Zionism ===
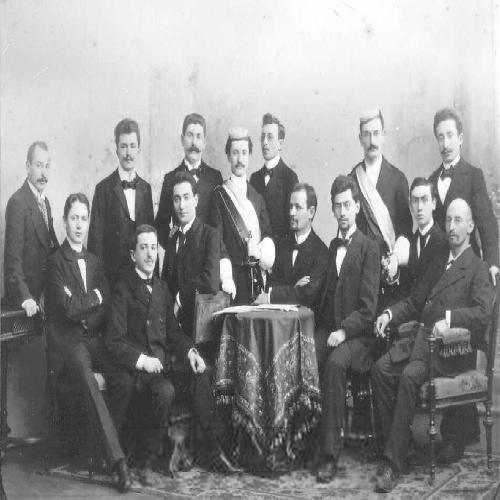
The Jewish Student Association in Leipzig with Buber in the center (1899)

Approaching Zionism from his own personal viewpoint, a young Buber disagreed with Theodor Herzl about their respective positions on Zionism. Herzl did not envision Zionism as a movement with religious objectives. In contrast, Buber believed the potential of Zionism was for social and spiritual enrichment. For example, Buber argued that following the formation of the Israeli state, there would need to be reforms to Judaism: "We need someone who would do for Judaism what Pope John XXIII has done for the Catholic Church". Herzl and Buber would continue, in mutual respect and disagreement, to work towards their respective goals for the rest of their lives. In 1902, Buber became the editor of the weekly Die Welt, the central organ of the Zionist movement. However, a year later he became involved with the Jewish Hasidic movement. Buber admired how the Hasidic communities actualized their religion in daily life and culture. In stark contrast to the busy Zionist organizations, which were always mulling political concerns, the Hasidim were focused on the values which Buber had long advocated for Zionism to adopt. In 1904, he withdrew from much of his Zionist organizational work, and devoted himself to study and writing, as in that same year, he published his thesis, Beiträge zur Geschichte des Individuationsproblems, on Jakob Böhme and Nikolaus Cusanus.

In a 1910 essay entitled "He and We", Buber established himself and Herzl (who had died in 1904) as diametrically opposed in their perspectives on Zionism. Buber described Herzl by saying, "The impulse of the elementally active person (Elementaraktiver) to act is so strong that it prevents him from acquiring knowledge for the sake of knowledge," and, according to Buber, when a person like Herzl is aware of his Jewishness, "In him awakens the will to help the Jews to whom he belongs, to lead the where they can experience freedom and security. Now he does what his will tells him. He does not see anything else." In that same essay, Buber would draw a parallel between Herzl and Baal Shem Tov, the founder of Hasidism, arguing that both seek to reinstate the Jewish people, the difference coming in their approaches; Herzl affecting change indirectly via history whereas Baal Shem Tov sought to achieve improvement directly through religion.

=== 1915–38: Further development ===
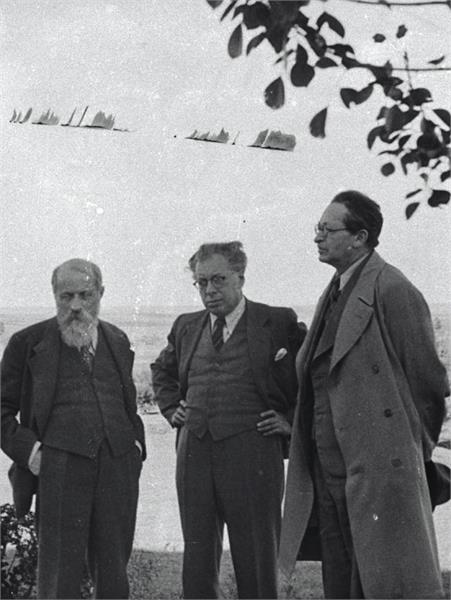
Martin Buber, Yitzhak Ben Zvi, and Leo Herman in Jerusalem (1915)

Buber produced multiple writings on Zionism and nationalism during this period, expanding upon broader ideas related to Zionism. In light of the outbreak of WWI, Buber engaged in debates with fellow German philosopher Hermann Cohen in 1915 on the nature of nationalism and Zionism. Whereas Cohen, whose argument was based in messianic principles, believed that a Jewish minority was essential to a broader German national identity, Buber argued that, "Judaism may well be taken up in messianic humanity, to be melted into it; we do not, however, consider that the Jewish people must disappear among contemporary humanity so that a messianic humanity might arise."

Buber continued to explore and develop his views on Zionism in these years. One such notable piece of writing is a letter to a professor entitled "Concepts and Reality" in 1916. In this letter, Buber addresses the issues of nationalism, Messianism, and Hebrew within the Zionist movement of the period. Buber argued that nationalism is not a natural phenomenon, and that Zionism is a movement centered around religiosity, not nationalism. However, according to Buber, the messianic movement within Zionism is obscured by those in liberal Jewish and anti-Zionist circles, who argue that Messianism necessitates a diaspora. On the importance of the Hebrew language, Buber believed, "Hebrew is not first and foremost a vernacular but the single language that can fully absorb and express the sublime values of Judaism."

In the early 1920s, Martin Buber started advocating a binational Jewish-Arab state, stating that the Jewish people should proclaim "its desire to live in peace and brotherhood with the Arab people, and to develop the common homeland into a republic in which both peoples will have the possibility of free development."

Buber rejected the idea of Zionism as just another national movement, and wanted instead to see the creation of an exemplary society; a society which would not be characterized by Jewish domination of the Arabs. He was influenced by cultural Zionist Ahad Ha'am. Buber believed that it was necessary for the Zionist movement to reach a consensus with the Arabs even at the cost of the Jews remaining a minority in the country. In 1925, he, alongside his friend Judah Magnes, was involved in the creation of the organization Brit Shalom (Covenant of Peace), which advocated the creation of a binational state, and throughout the rest of his life, he hoped and believed that Jews and Arabs one day would live in peace in a joint nation.

In a 1929 essay entitled "The National Home and National Policy in Palestine," Buber explores Jewish right to the land of Israel before engaging with the question of Jewish-Arab relations. According to Buber, the Zionist right to establish a country in Israel originates from their ancient, ancestral connection to the land, the fact that Jews have worked to cultivate the land in recent years, and the future prospect that a Jewish state offers as both a cultural center for Judaism and a model for creating a new social organization, referencing the emergence of kibbutzim. Buber goes on to discuss, broadly, the necessity for injustice in order to survive, and focuses it to the Zionist perspective by writing, "It is indeed true that there can be no life without injustice. The fact that there is no living creature that can live and thrive without destroying another existing organism has a symbolic significance as regards our human life. But the human aspect of life begins the moment we say to ourselves: We will not do more injustice to others than we are forced to do to exist." Buber then uses this perspective to argue in favor of Binationalism as means to establish a combination of potential coexistence and national independence.

=== Post 1938: Zionist views from Israel and post-Independence Zionism ===
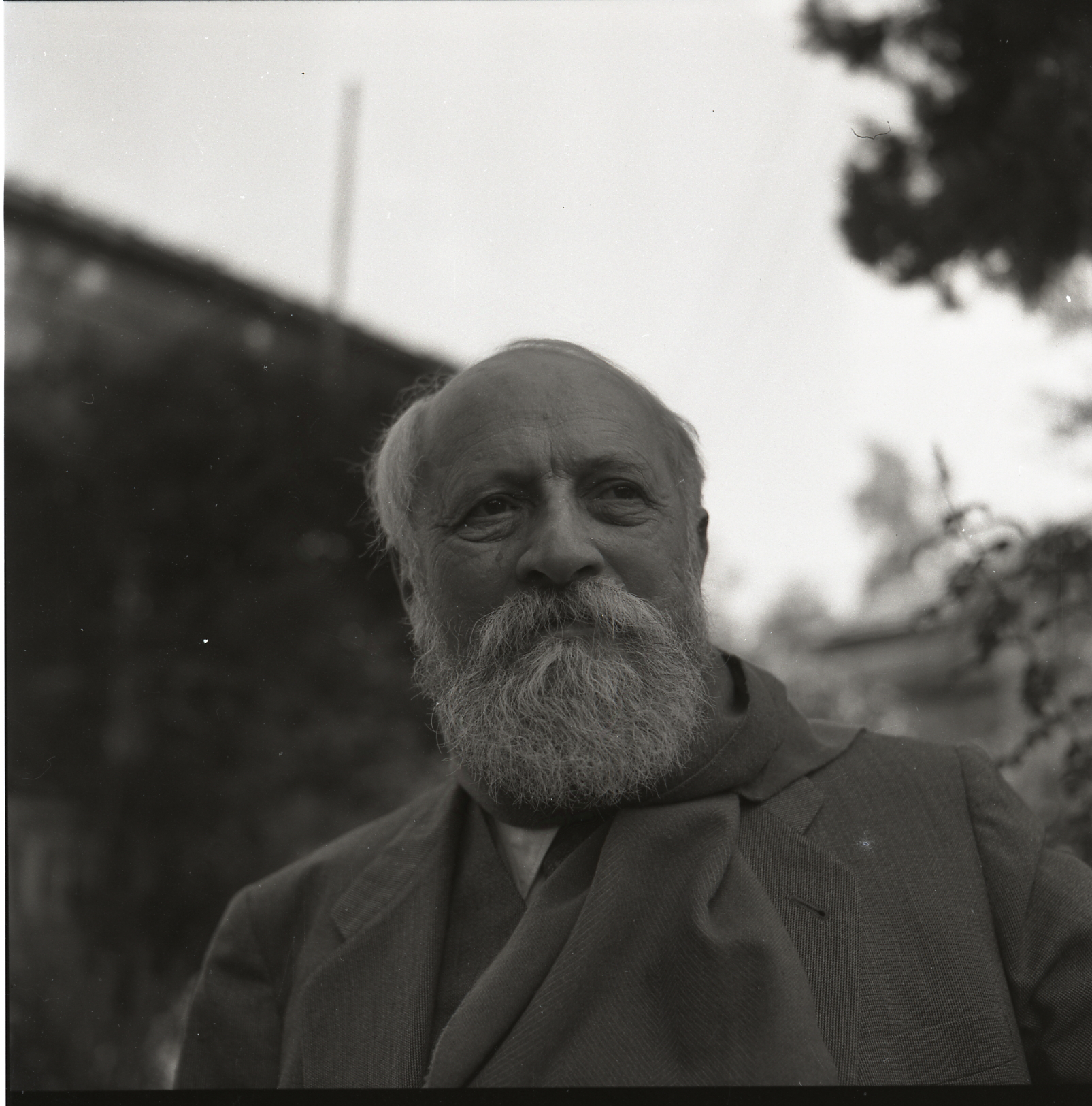
Martin Buber in Israel (1962)

Living and writing in Jerusalem, Buber increased his political involvement, and continued to develop his ideas on Zionism. In 1942, he co‑founded the Ihud party, which advocated a bi-nationalist program. Nevertheless, he was connected with decades of friendship to Zionists and philosophers such as Chaim Weizmann, Max Brod, Hugo Bergmann, and Felix Weltsch, who were close friends of his from old European times in Prague, Berlin, and Vienna to the Jerusalem of the 1940s through the 1960s.

Buber evaluated the competing strains of cultural and political Zionism from a somewhat teleological perspective in a 1948 piece "Zionism and Zionism". He summarizes these two competing perspectives as, on the one hand, "returning and restoring the true Israel, whose spirit and life would once again no longer exist beside each other," and, on the other hand, as a process of "normalization," and that to be "normal," a "nation needs a land, a language, and independence. Thus, one must only go and acquire those commodities, and the rest will take care of itself." According to Buber, as Jews and Israel succeed at being a "normal nation," the drive for a spiritual and cultural rebirth is lost, and the war being waged over political structure threatens to become a war for survival. After the establishment of Israel in 1948, Buber advocated Israel's participation in a federation of "Near East" states wider than just Palestine. Buber outlines this concept in "Zionism and Zionism". For Buber, Israel has the potential to serve as an example for the "Near East" as, in his Binationalist perspective, two independent nations, could each maintain their own cultural identity, "but both united in the enterprise of developing their common homeland and in the federal management of shared matters. On the strength of that covenant we wish to return once more to the union of Near Eastern nations, to build an economy integrated in that of the Near East, to carry out policies in the framework of the life of the Near East, and, God willing, to send the "living idea" forth to the world from the Near East once again." During this same time period Buber remained critical of many policies and leaders of the new Israeli government. He was particularly vocal about the treatment of Arab refugees, and was unafraid to criticize top leadership like David Ben-Gurion, the first Prime Minister.

== Literary and academic career ==
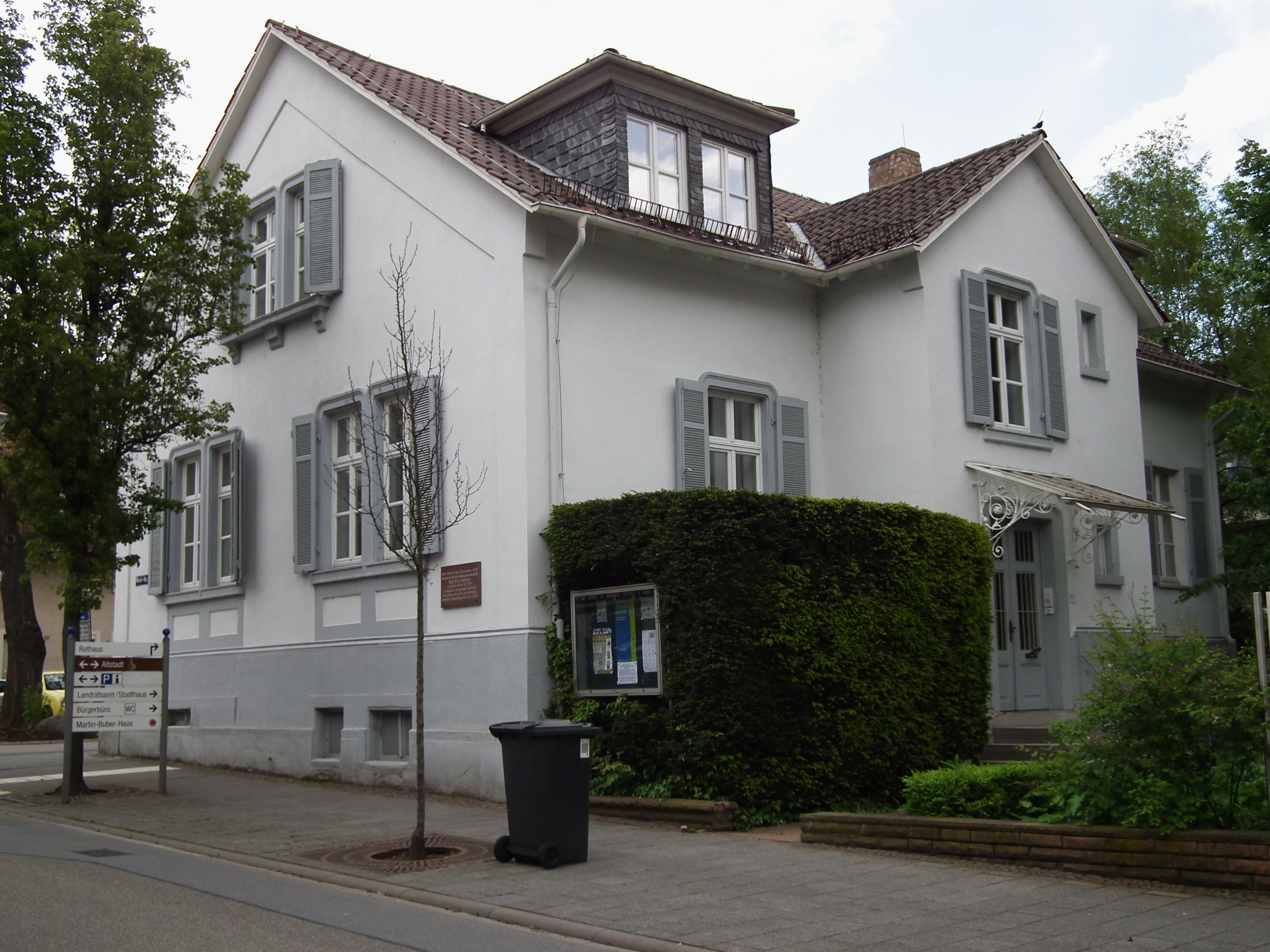
Martin Buber's house (1916–38) in Heppenheim, Germany. Now the headquarters of the ICCJ.

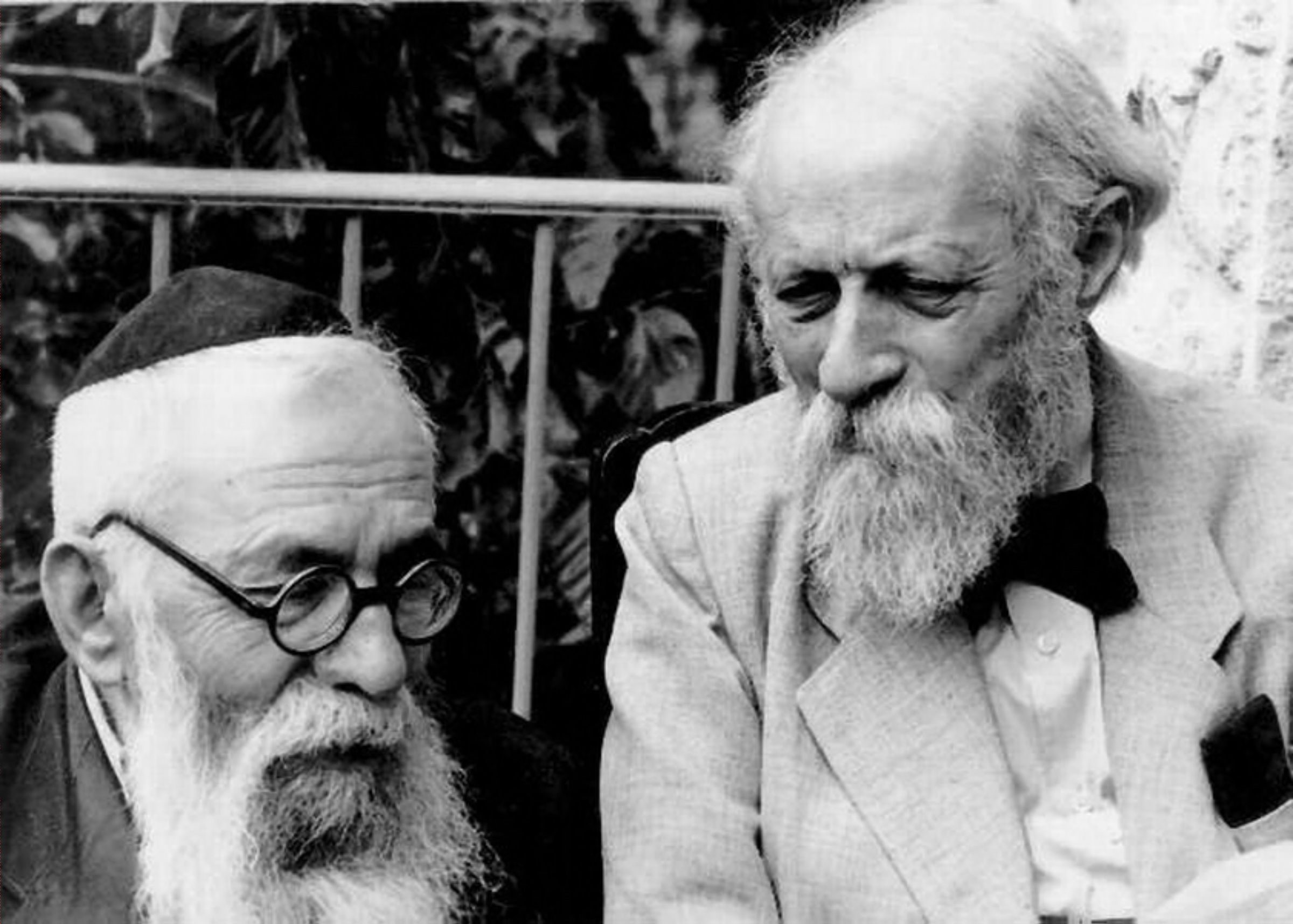
Martin Buber and Rabbi Binyamin in Palestine (1920–30)

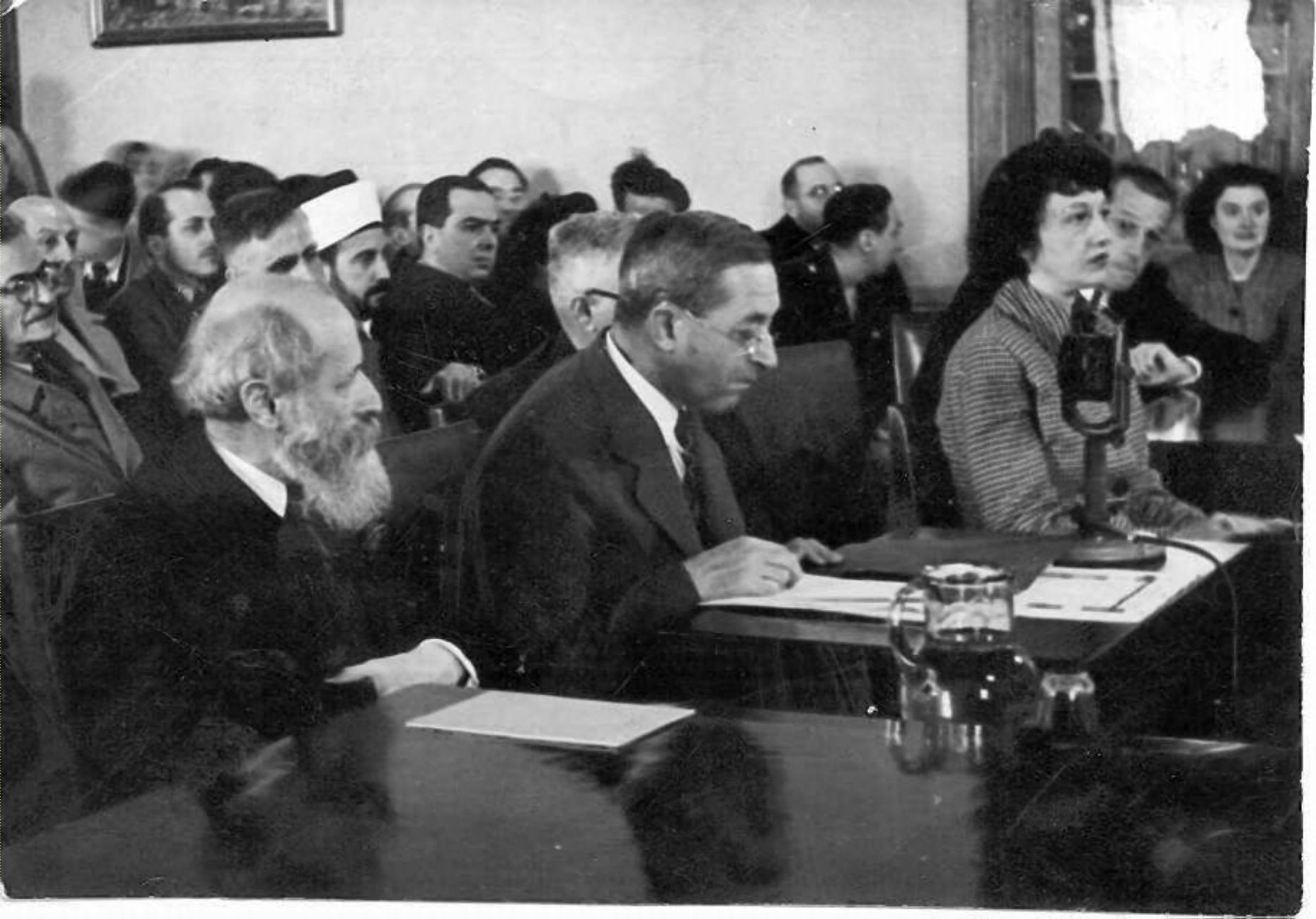
Buber (left) and Judah Leon Magnes testifying before the Anglo-American Committee of Inquiry in Jerusalem (1946)

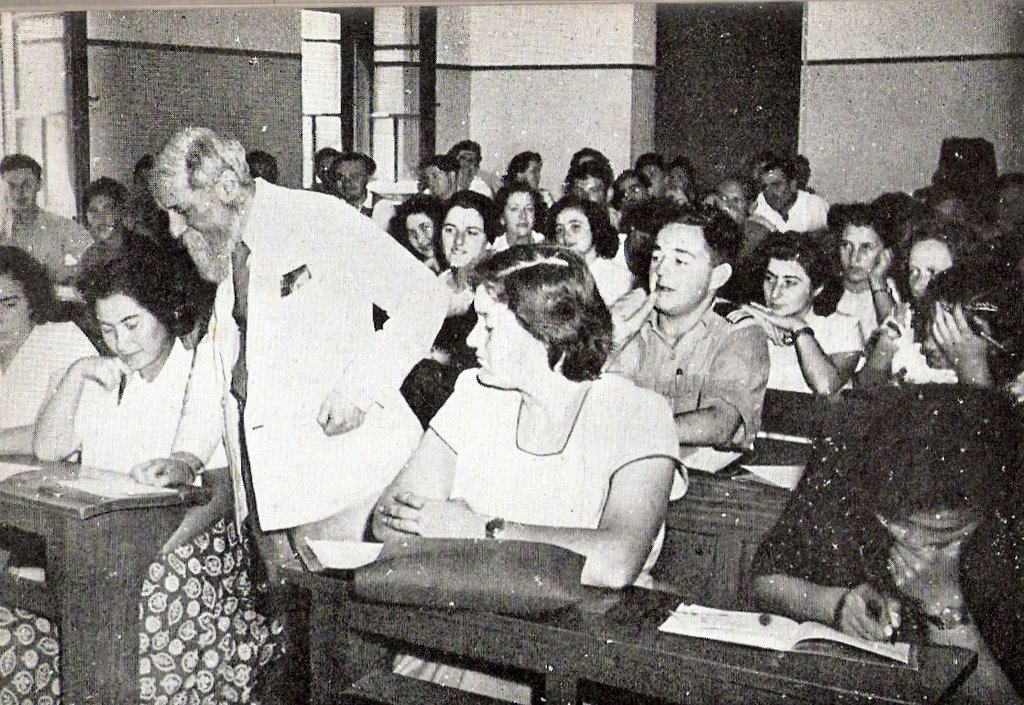
Buber in the Jewish Quarter in Jerusalem, prior to 1948

From 1905 he worked for the publishing house Rütten & Loening as a lecturer; there he initiated and supervised the completion of the social psychological monograph series Die Gesellschaft.

From 1906 until 1914, Buber published editions of Hasidic, mystical, and mythic texts from Jewish and world sources. In 1916, he moved from Berlin to Heppenheim.

During World War I, he helped establish the Jewish National Committee to improve the condition of Eastern European Jews. During that period he became the editor of Der Jude (German for "The Jew"), a Jewish monthly (until 1924). In 1921, Buber began his close relationship with Franz Rosenzweig. In 1922, he and Rosenzweig co-operated in Rosenzweig's House of Jewish Learning, known in Germany as Lehrhaus.

In 1923, Buber wrote his famous essay on existence, Ich und Du (later translated into English as I and Thou). Though he edited the work later in his life, he refused to make substantial changes. In 1925, he began, in conjunction with Franz Rosenzweig, translating the Hebrew Bible into German (Die Schrift). He himself called this translation Verdeutschung ("Germanification"), since it does not always use literary German language, but instead attempts to find new dynamic (often newly invented) equivalent phrasing to respect the multivalent Hebrew original. Between 1926 and 1930, Buber co-edited the quarterly Die Kreatur ("The Creature").

In 1930, Buber became an honorary professor at the University of Frankfurt am Main. He resigned in protest from his professorship immediately after Adolf Hitler came to power in 1933. On October 4, 1933, the Nazi authorities forbade him to lecture. In 1935, he was expelled from the Reich Chamber of Literature. He then founded the Central Office for Jewish Adult Education, which became an increasingly important body, as the German government forbade Jews to attend public education. The Nazi administration increasingly obstructed this body.

Finally, in 1938, Buber left Germany, and settled in Jerusalem, then capital of Mandate Palestine. He received a professorship at Hebrew University, there lecturing in anthropology and introductory sociology. The lectures he gave during the first semester were published in the book The problem of man (Das Problem des Menschen); in these lectures he discusses how the question "What is Man?" became the central one in philosophical anthropology. He participated in the discussion of the Jews' problems in Palestine and of the Arab question – working out of his Biblical, philosophic, and Hasidic work.

He became a member of the group Ihud, which aimed at a bi-national state for Arabs and Jews in Palestine. Such a binational confederation was viewed by Buber as a more proper fulfillment of Zionism than a solely Jewish state. In 1949, he published his work Paths in Utopia, in which he detailed his communitarian socialist views and his theory of the "dialogical community" founded upon interpersonal "dialogical relationships".

After World War II, Buber began lecture tours in Europe and the United States. In 1952, he argued with Jung over the existence of God.

== Philosophy ==
Buber is famous for his thesis of dialogical existence, as he described in the book I and Thou. However, his work dealt with a range of issues including religious consciousness, modernity, the concept of evil, ethics, education, and Biblical hermeneutics.

Buber rejected the label of "philosopher" or "theologian", claiming he was not interested in ideas, only personal experience, and could not discuss God, but only relationships to God.

Politically, Buber's social philosophy on points of prefiguration aligns with that of anarchism, though Buber explicitly disavowed the affiliation in his lifetime and justified the existence of a state under limited conditions.

=== Dialogue and existence ===
In I and Thou, Buber introduced his thesis on human existence. Inspired by Feuerbach's The Essence of Christianity and Kierkegaard's Single One, Buber worked upon the premise of existence as encounter. He explained this philosophy using the word pairs of Ich-Du and Ich-Es to categorize the modes of consciousness, interaction, and being through which an individual engages with other individuals, inanimate objects, and all reality in general. Philosophically, these word pairs express complex ideas about modes of being—particularly how a person exists and actualizes that existence. As Buber argues in I and Thou, a person is at all times engaged with the world in one of these modes.

The generic motif Buber employs to describe the dual modes of being is one of dialogue (Ich-Du) and monologue (Ich-Es). The concept of communication, particularly language-oriented communication, is used both in describing dialogue/monologue through metaphors and expressing the interpersonal nature of human existence.

==== Ich-Du ====
Ich‑Du ("I‑Thou" or "I‑You" – 'you' in a very personal, connected sense. 'Du' in German means 'you', but is generally only used to a closely-connected person, such as a close relative) is a relationship that stresses the mutual, holistic existence of two beings. It is a concrete encounter, because these beings meet one another in their authentic existence, without any qualification or objectification of one another. Even imagination and ideas do not play a role in this relation. In an I–Thou encounter, infinity and universality are made actual (rather than being merely concepts). Buber stressed that an Ich‑Du relationship lacks any composition (e. g., structure) and communicates no content (e. g., information). Despite the fact that Ich‑Du cannot be proven to happen as an event (e. g., it cannot be measured), Buber stressed that it is real and perceivable. A variety of examples are used to illustrate Ich‑Du relationships in daily life—two lovers, an observer and a cat, the author and a tree, and two strangers on a train. Common English words used to describe the Ich‑Du relationship include encounter, meeting, dialogue, mutuality, and exchange.

One key Ich‑Du relationship Buber identified was that which can exist between a human being and God. Buber argued that this is the only way in which it is possible to interact with God, and that an Ich‑Du relationship with anything or anyone connects in some way with the eternal relation to God.

To create this I–Thou relationship with God, a person has to be open to the idea of such a relationship, but not actively pursue it. The pursuit of such a relation creates qualities associated with It‑ness, and so would prevent an I‑You relation, limiting it to I‑It. Buber claims that if we are open to the I–Thou, God eventually comes to us in response to our welcome. Also, because the God Buber describes is completely devoid of qualities, this I–Thou relationship lasts as long as the individual wills it. When the individual finally returns to the I‑It way of relating, this acts as a barrier to deeper relationship and community.

==== Ich-Es ====
The Ich-Es ("I‑It") relationship is nearly the opposite of Ich‑Du. Whereas in Ich‑Du the two beings encounter one another, in an Ich‑Es relationship the beings do not actually meet. Instead, the "I" confronts and qualifies an idea, or conceptualization, of the being in its presence and treats that being as an object. All such objects are considered merely mental representations, created and sustained by the individual mind. This is based partly on Kant's theory of phenomenon, in that these objects reside in the cognitive agent's mind, existing only as thoughts. Therefore, the Ich‑Es relationship is in fact a relationship with oneself; it is not a dialogue, but a monologue.

In the Ich-Es relationship, an individual treats other things, people, etc., as objects to be used and experienced. Essentially, this form of objectivity relates to the world in terms of the self – how an object can serve the individual's interest.

Buber argued that human life consists of an oscillation between Ich‑Du and Ich‑Es, and that in fact Ich‑Du experiences are rather few and far between. In diagnosing the various perceived ills of modernity (e. g., isolation, dehumanization, etc.), Buber believed that the expansion of a purely analytic, material view of existence was at heart an advocation of Ich‑Es relations - even between human beings. Buber argued that this paradigm devalued not only existents, but the meaning of all existence.

== Students and colleagues ==
Buber was a sort of mentor figure in the lives of Gershom Scholem and Walter Benjamin, the 'Kabbalist of the Holy City' and the 'Marxist Rabbi' of Berlin during the era leading up to, overlapping with proceeding after the Holocaust (Benjamin died during his escape from Europe, but Buber retained contact with Scholem after the war).

While his relationship with these two was sometimes unilaterally contentious (with the students occasionally attacking or critiquing their patron somewhat viciously) Buber acted as an impresario, publisher and by various means as one of the great sponsors of their careers and growing reputations. Scholem was to be amongst the friends and interested parties who helped attend to and orchestrate Buber's eventual emigration to Palestine from the very beginning stages of that discussion during the rise of Hitler. They corresponded also in regards to their work with Brit Shalom, an early think-tank that was tasked with figuring out the dynamics of two-state solution to be brokered between Israel and Palestine more than twenty years before Israel became a nation state—and also about a great many issues regarding their shared interest in ancient, sacred and often mystical Jewish literature whilst keeping tabs likewise on mutual acquaintances and important publications in their fields of interest. Scholem dedicated his bibliography of the Zohar to Buber.

== Hasidism and mysticism ==
Buber was a scholar, interpreter, and translator of Hasidic lore. He viewed Hasidism as a source of cultural renewal for Judaism, frequently citing examples from the Hasidic tradition that emphasized community, interpersonal life, and meaning in everyday activities (e.g., a worker's relation to his tools). The Hasidic ideal, according to Buber, emphasized a life lived in the unconditional presence of God, with no distinct separation between daily habits and religious experience. This was a major influence on Buber's philosophy of anthropology, which held that the basis of human existence is dialogical.

In 1906, Buber published Die Geschichten des Rabbi Nachman, a collection of the tales of Rabbi Nachman of Breslov, a renowned Hasidic rebbe, as interpreted and retold in a Neo-Hasidic fashion by Buber. Two years later, Buber published Die Legende des Baalschem (stories of the Baal Shem Tov), the founder of Hasidism.

== Awards and recognition ==
- In 1951, Buber received the Goethe award of the University of Hamburg.
- In 1953, he received the Peace Prize of the German Book Trade.
- In 1958, he was awarded the Israel Prize in the humanities.
- In 1961, he was awarded the Bialik Prize for Jewish thought.
- In 1963, he won the Erasmus Prize in Amsterdam.

== Published works ==
=== In English ===
- 1937, I and Thou, transl. by Ronald Gregor Smith, Edinburgh: T. and T. Clark. 2nd Edition New York: Scribners, 1958. 1st Scribner Classics ed. New York, NY: Scribner, 2000, c1986
- 1952, Eclipse of God, New York: Harper and Bros. 2nd Edition Westport, Conn.: Greenwood Press, 1977.
- 1952, Good & Evil, New York: Scribner
- 1957, Pointing the Way, transl. Maurice Friedman, New York: Harper, 1957, 2nd Edition New York: Schocken, 1974.
- 1960, The Origin and Meaning of Hasidism, transl. M. Friedman, New York: Horizon Press.
- 1964, Daniel: Dialogues on Realization, New York, Holt, Rinehart and Winston.
- 1965, The Knowledge of Man, transl. Ronald Gregor Smith and Maurice Friedman, New York: Harper & Row. 2nd Edition New York, 1966.
- 1966, The Way of Response: Martin Buber; Selections from his Writings, edited by N. N. Glatzer. New York: Schocken Books.
- 1967a, A Believing Humanism: My Testament, translation of Nachlese (Heidelberg 1965) by M. Friedman, New York: Simon and Schuster.
- 1967b, On Judaism, edited by Nahum Glatzer and transl. by Eva Jospe and others, New York: Schocken Books.
- 1968, On the Bible: Eighteen Studies, edited by Nahum Glatzer, New York: Schocken Books.
- 1970a, I and Thou, a new translation with a prologue “I and you” and notes by Walter Kaufmann, New York: Scribner's Sons.
- 1970b, Mamre: Essays in Religion, translated by Greta Hort, Westport, Conn.: Greenwood Press.
- 1970c, Martin Buber and the Theater, Including Martin Buber's “Mystery Play” Elijah, edited and translated with three introductory essays by Maurice Friedman, New York, Funk &Wagnalls.
- 1972, Encounter: Autobiographical Fragments. La Salle, Ill.: Open Court.
- 1973a, On Zion: the History of an Idea, with a new foreword by Nahum N. Glatzer, Translated from the German by Stanley Godman, New York: Schocken Books.
- 1973b, Meetings, edited with an introduction and bibliography by Maurice Friedman, La Salle, Ill.: Open Court Pub. Co. 3rd ed. London, New York: Routledge, 2002.
- 1983, A Land of Two Peoples: Martin Buber on Jews and Arabs, edited with commentary by Paul R. Mendes-Flohr, New York: Oxford University Press. 2nd Edition Gloucester, Mass.: *Peter Smith, 1994
- 1985, Ecstatic Confessions, edited by Paul Mendes-Flohr, translated by Esther Cameron, San Francisco: Harper & Row.
- 1991a, Chinese Tales: Zhuangzi, Sayings and Parables and Chinese Ghost and Love stories, translated by Alex Page, with an introduction by Irene Eber, Atlantic Highlands, N.J.: Humanities Press International.
- 1991b, Tales of the Hasidim, foreword by Chaim Potok, New York: Schocken Books, distributed by Pantheon.
- 1992, On Intersubjectivity and Cultural Creativity, edited and with an introduction by S.N. Eisenstadt, Chicago: University of Chicago Press.
- 1994, Scripture and Translation, Martin Buber and Franz Rosenzweig, translated by Lawrence Rosenwald with Everett Fox. Bloomington: Indiana University Press.
- 1996, Paths in Utopia, translated by R.F. Hull. Syracuse: Syracuse University Press.
- 1999a, The First Buber: Youthful Zionist Writings of Martin Buber, edited and translated from the German by Gilya G. Schmidt, Syracuse, N.Y.: Syracuse University Press.
- 1999b, Martin Buber on Psychology and Psychotherapy: Essays, Letters, and Dialogue, edited by Judith Buber Agassi, with a foreword by Paul Roazin, New York: Syracuse University Press.
- 1999c, Gog and Magog: A Novel, translated from the German by Ludwig Lewisohn, Syracuse, NY: Syracuse University Press.
- 2002a, The Legend of the Baal-Shem, translated by Maurice Friedman, London: Routledge.
- 2002b, Between Man and Man, translated by Ronald Gregor-Smith, with an introduction by Maurice Friedman, London, New York: Routledge.
- 2002c, The Way of Man: According to the Teaching of Hasidim, London: Routledge.
- 2002d, The Martin Buber Reader: Essential Writings, edited by Asher D. Biemann, New York: Palgrave Macmillan.
- 2002e, Ten Rungs: Collected Hasidic Sayings, translated by Olga Marx, London: Routledge.
- 2003, Two Types of Faith, translated by Norman P. Goldhawk with an afterword by David Flusser, Syracuse, N.Y.: Syracuse University Press.

=== Original writings (German) ===
- Die Geschichten des Rabbi Nachman (1906)
- Die fünfzigste Pforte (1907)
- Die Legende des Baalschem (1908)
- Ekstatische Konfessionen (1909)
- Chinesische Geister- und Liebesgeschichten (1911)
- Daniel – Gespräche von der Verwirklichung (1913)
- Die jüdische Bewegung – gesammelte Aufsätze und Ansprachen 1900–1915 (1916)
- Vom Geist des Judentums – Reden und Geleitworte (1916)
- Die Rede, die Lehre und das Lied – drei Beispiele (1917)
- Ereignisse und Begegnungen (1917)
- Der grosse Maggid und seine Nachfolge (1922)
- Reden über das Judentum (1923)
- Ich und Du (1923)
  - Translation: I and Thou by Walter Kaufmann (Touchstone: 1970)
- Das Verborgene Licht (1924)
- Die chassidischen Bücher (1928)
- Aus unbekannten Schriften (1928)
- Zwiesprache (1932)
- Kampf um Israel – Reden und Schriften 1921–1932 (1933)
- Hundert chassidische Geschichten (1933)
- Die Troestung Israels : aus Jeschajahu, Kapitel 40 bis 55 (1933); with Franz Rosenzweig
- Erzählungen von Engeln, Geistern und Dämonen (1934)
- Das Buch der Preisungen (1935); with Franz Rosenzweig
- Deutung des Chassidismus – drei Versuche (1935)
- Die Josefslegende in aquarellierten Zeichnungen eines unbekannten russischen Juden der Biedermeierzeit (1935)
- Die Schrift und ihre Verdeutschung (1936); with Franz Rosenzweig
- Aus Tiefen rufe ich Dich – dreiundzwanzig Psalmen in der Urschrift (1936)
- Das Kommende : Untersuchungen zur Entstehungsgeschichte des Messianischen Glaubens – 1. Königtum Gottes (1936 ?)
- Die Stunde und die Erkenntnis – Reden und Aufsätze 1933–1935 (1936)
- Zion als Ziel und als Aufgabe – Gedanken aus drei Jahrzehnten – mit einer Rede über Nationalismus als Anhang (1936)
- Worte an die Jugend (1938)
- Moseh (1945)
- Dialogisches Leben – gesammelte philosophische und pädagogische Schriften (1947)
- Der Weg des Menschen : nach der chassidischen Lehre (1948)
- Das Problem des Menschen (1948, Hebrew text 1942)
- Die Erzählungen der Chassidim (1949)
- Gog und Magog – eine Chronik (1949, Hebrew text 1943)
- Israel und Palästina – zur Geschichte einer Idee (1950, Hebrew text 1944)
- Der Glaube der Propheten (1950)
- Pfade in Utopia (1950)
- Zwei Glaubensweisen (1950)
- Urdistanz und Beziehung (1951)
- Der utopische Sozialismus (1952)
- Bilder von Gut und Böse (1952)
- Die Chassidische Botschaft (1952)
- Recht und Unrecht – Deutung einiger Psalmen (1952)
- An der Wende – Reden über das Judentum (1952)
- Zwischen Gesellschaft und Staat (1952)
- Das echte Gespräch und die Möglichkeiten des Friedens (1953)
- Einsichten : aus den Schriften gesammelt (1953)
- Reden über Erziehung (1953)
- Gottesfinsternis – Betrachtungen zur Beziehung zwischen Religion und Philosophie (1953)
  - Translation Eclipse of God: Studies in the Relation Between Religion and Philosophy (Harper and Row: 1952)
- Hinweise – gesammelte Essays (1953)
- Die fünf Bücher der Weisung – Zu einer neuen Verdeutschung der Schrift (1954); with Franz Rosenzweig
- Die Schriften über das dialogische Prinzip (Ich und Du, Zwiesprache, Die Frage an den Einzelnen, Elemente des Zwischenmenschlichen) (1954)
- Sehertum – Anfang und Ausgang (1955)
- Der Mensch und sein Gebild (1955)
- Schuld und Schuldgefühle (1958)
- Begegnung – autobiographische Fragmente (1960)
- Logos : zwei Reden (1962)
- Nachlese (1965)

Chinesische Geister- und Liebesgeschichten included the first German translation ever made of Strange Stories from a Chinese Studio. Alex Page translated the Chinesische Geister- und Liebesgeschichten as "Chinese Tales", published in 1991 by Humanities Press.

=== Collected works ===
Werke 3 volumes (1962–1964)

- I Schriften zur Philosophie (1962)
- II Schriften zur Bibel (1964)
- III Schriften zum Chassidismus (1963)

Martin Buber Werkausgabe (MBW). Berliner Akademie der Wissenschaften / Israel Academy of Sciences and Humanities, ed. Paul Mendes-Flohr & Peter Schäfer with Martina Urban; 21 volumes planned (2001–)

=== Correspondence ===
Briefwechsel aus sieben Jahrzehnten 1897–1965 (1972–1975)

- I : 1897–1918 (1972)
- II : 1918–1938 (1973)
- III : 1938–1965 (1975)

Several of his original writings, including his personal archives, are preserved in the National Library of Israel, formerly the Jewish National and University Library, located on the campus of the Hebrew University of Jerusalem

== See also ==
- Existential therapy
- Guilt
- Humanistic psychology
- Intersubjectivity
- Contextual therapy
- André Neher
- List of Israel Prize recipients
- List of Bialik Prize recipients
- Jewish existentialism

== Sources ==
Biographies

- Biemann, Asher D., ed. (2002). The Martin Buber Reader: Essential Writings. Palgrave Macmillan US. ISBN 978-0-312-24051-6. LCCN 2002016924. OCLC 48877750.
- Buber, Martin (1996). Paths in Utopia. Syracuse University Press. ISBN 978-0-8156-0421-1.
- Zink, Wolfgang (1978), Martin Buber – 1878/1978
- Coen, Clara Levi (1991), Martin Buber
- Friedman, Maurice (1981), Martin Buber's Life and Work: The Early Years, 1878–1923
- Friedman, Maurice (1983), Martin Buber's Life and Work: The Middle Years, 1923–1945
- Friedman, Maurice (1984), Martin Buber's Life and Work: The Later Years, 1945–1965
- Bourel, Dominique (2015), Martin Buber: Sentinelle de l'humanité
- Mendes-Flohr, Paul (2019), Martin Buber: A Life of Faith and Dissent, Yale University Press, ISBN 9780300245233
