= Kurt Müller (politician) =

German Politician

Kurt Müller (1903–1990) was the deputy chairman of the Communist Party of Germany (German: Kommunistische Partei Deutschlands; KPD). He was one of the victims of the Stalinist purges in the early 1950s. Müller was arrested in East Germany in March 1950. He traveled from West Germany, believing he would be attending an important meeting, only to be accused of being an enemy agent and Trotskyite. While in Soviet custody, he was interrogated by the Stasi chief Erich Mielke, and spent six years imprisoned in the Sachsenhausen camp, the former Nazi concentration camp which continued operating as NKVD special camp Nr. 7 under NKVD control in the Soviet Occupation Zone.

Müller wrote to Otto Grotewohl complaining about physical abuse and conditions in the prison. He protested his innocence and accused his interrogators, including Mielke, of breaking the constitutional laws of the German Democratic Republic (East Germany).

Müller was not the inspiration for the anti-Nazi character Kurt Muller from Lillian Hellman's play Watch on the Rhine (upon which the 1943 film is based); that character was based the Soviet spy Otto Katz.
