= Die Gazette =

Die Gazette (English: The Gazette) is a political culture magazine from Munich. It has appeared online since 1998 and printed since 2004.

It was published by Fritz R. Glunk from 1998 to 2014. The printed edition included 6,800 copies in 2014, according to the publisher.

The authors of Die Gazette include Carl Amery, Giscard d'Estaing, Rita Süssmuth, Uri Avnery, Christian Ude and Seyran Ates.
