= Greek austerity packages =

Austerity measures passed by Greek government

This article details the fourteen austerity packages passed by the Government of Greece between 2010 and 2017. These austerity measures were a result of the Greek government-debt crisis and other economic factors. All of the legislation listed remains in force.

== Background ==
Membership in the European Monetary Union (EMU) has posed problems for some social classes, like the working class in Germany, and also on a countrywide scale for some EU members. Greece is in the latter category, along with Portugal, Ireland and Spain, presenting the problem of sovereign default, sometimes also called a "sovereign debt crisis". This situation originated with the tenuous integration of the periphery countries of the European Union into the eurozone and was made worse by the Great Recession. Austerity was one of the policy measures available to governments to manage the economic downturn. Greek withdrawal from the eurozone is another alternative or institutional reform of the eurozone.

== 2010 ==
=== February ===
First austerity package

Hellenic Republic
- Territorial extent: Greece
- Enacted by: Hellenic Parliament
- Commenced: 9 February 2010
- Introduced by: Government of Greece
- Status: In force

The first austerity package was the first in a row of countermeasures to counter the Greek government-debt crisis. It was approved by the Hellenic Parliament in early 2010.

The purpose was to reduce the budget deficit. These measures preceded the First Economic Adjustment Programme for Greece known as "memorandum". It emerged after a promise by the Greek prime minister in the World Economic Forum of Davos, Switzerland to take measures to reduce the country's deficit. The package was implemented on 9 February 2010 and was expected to save €0.8 billion. It included a freeze in the salaries of all government employees, a 10% cut in bonuses, as well as cuts in overtime workers, public employees and work-related travel.

=== March ===
Second austerity package
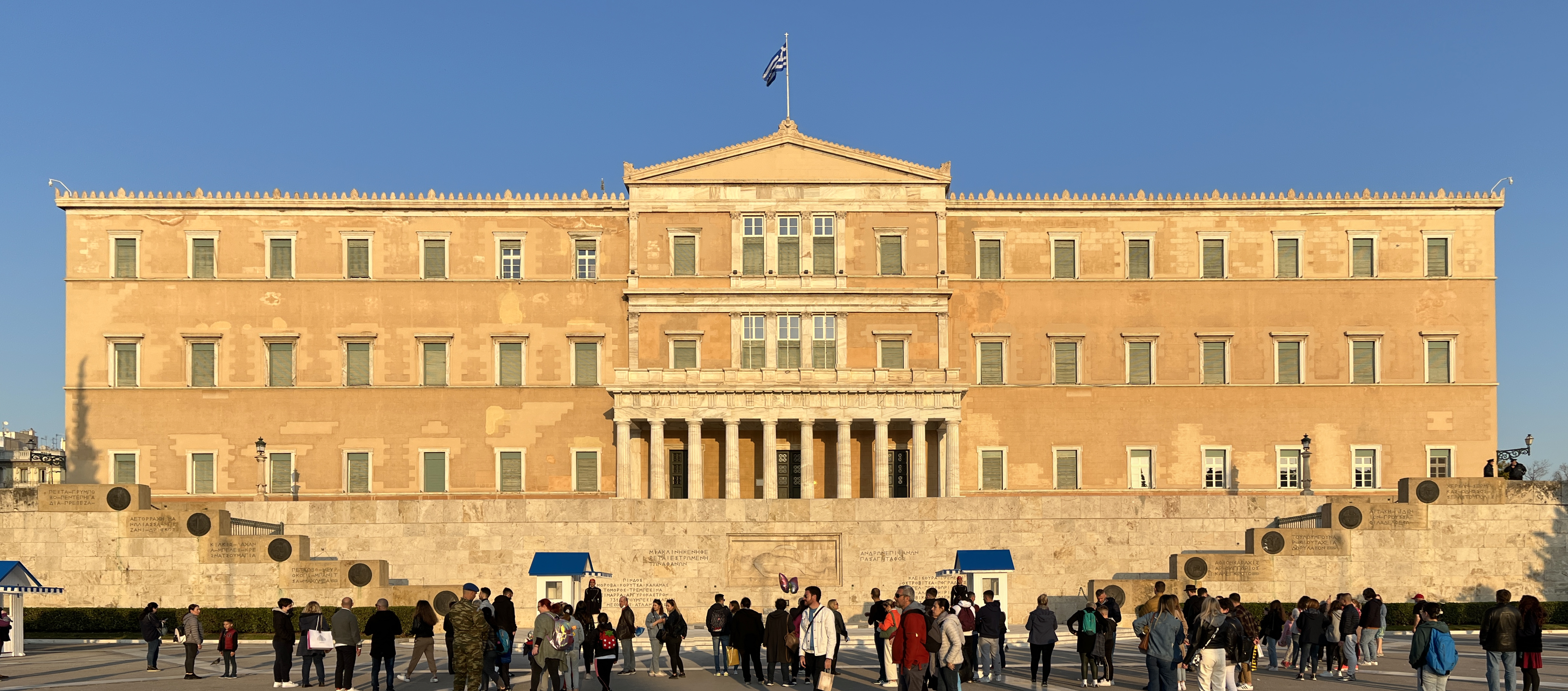

Hellenic Parliament
- Long title: Protection of the national economy - Emergency measures to tackle the fiscal crisis (Law 3833/2010)
- Territorial extent: Greece
- Passed by: Hellenic Parliament
- Passed: 5 March 2010
- Assented to: 11 March 2010
- Commenced: 13 March 2010

Legislative history
- Introduced by: Government of Greece
- Introduced: 3 March 2010
- Status: In force

The second austerity package was approved by the Hellenic Parliament in March 2010.

On 5 March 2010, amid new fears of bankruptcy, the Greek parliament passed the "Economy Protection Bill", which was expected to save another €4.8 billion. The measures include: 30% cuts in Christmas, Easter and leave of absence bonuses, a further 12% cut in public bonuses, a 7% cut in the salaries of public and private employees, a rise of the value added tax from 4.5% to 5%, from 9% to 10% and from 19% to 21%, a rise of the petrol tax to 15%, a rise in the taxes on imported cars of up to 10%–30%, among others.

On 23 April 2010, after realising the second austerity package failed to improve the country's economic position, the government requested that the EU/IMF bailout package be activated. Greece needed money before 19 May, or it would face a debt rollover of $11.3bn. The IMF had said it was "prepared to move expeditiously on this request".

Shortly after, the European Commission, the IMF and ECB set up a tripartite committee (the Troika) to prepare an appropriate programme of economic policies underlying a massive loan. The Troika was led by Servaas Deroose, from the European Commission, and included also Poul Thomsen (IMF) and Klaus Masuch (ECB) as junior partners. In return the government agreed to implement further measures.

=== June ===
Third austerity package – The first memorandum
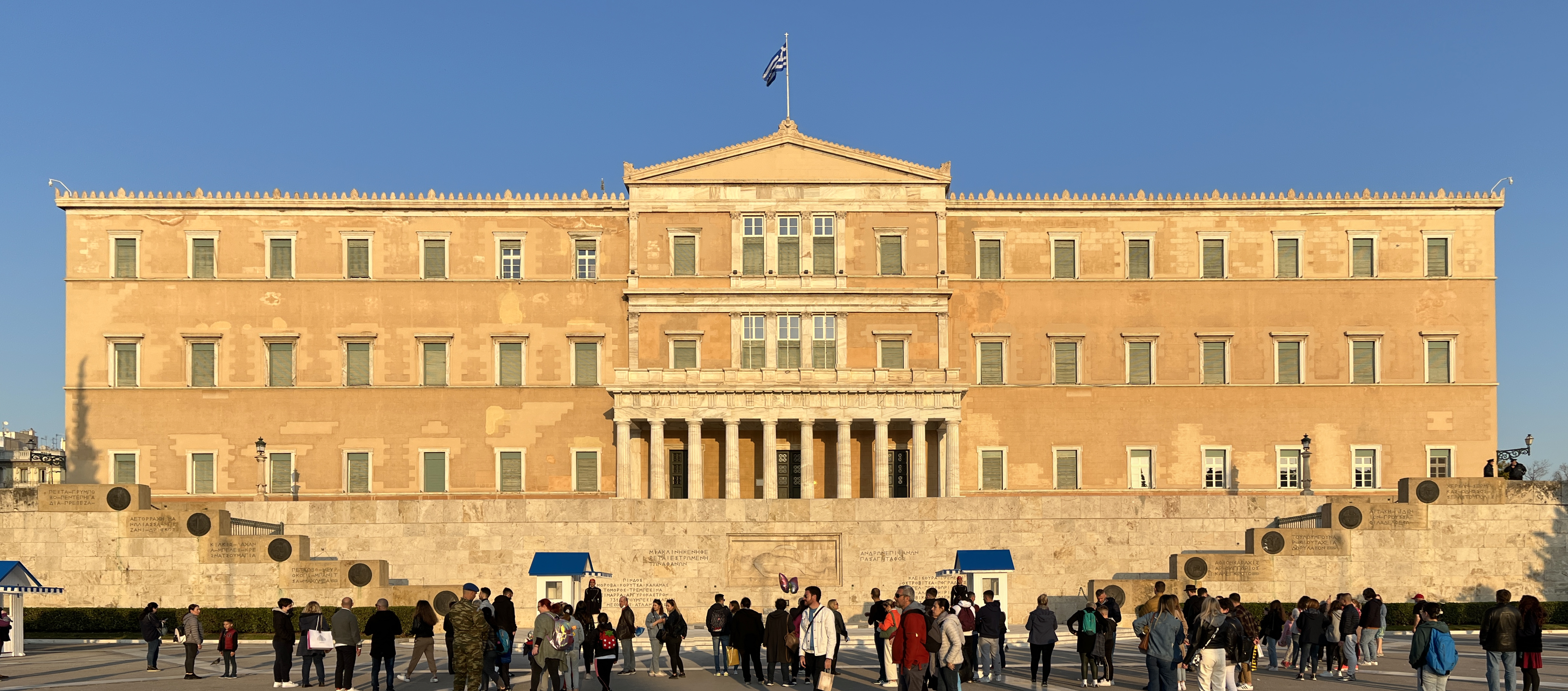

Hellenic Parliament
- Long title: Measures for implementing the support mechanism of the Greek economy by the member-states of the Eurozone and the IMF (Law 3845/2010)
- Territorial extent: Greece
- Passed by: Hellenic Parliament
- Passed: 6 May 2010
- Assented to: 6 May 2010
- Commenced: 6 May 2010

Legislative history
- Introduced by: Government of Greece
- Passed: 6 May 2010
- Voting summary: 172 voted for; 121 voted against; 3 abstained
- Status: In force

The third austerity package came with the signing of the First Economic Adjustment Programme for Greece known as First Memorandum with the European Union, the International Monetary Fund (IMF) and the European Central Bank (ECB). It was announced in May 2010 and approved by the Hellenic Parliament in June 2010.

On 1 May 2010, Prime Minister George Papandreou announced a new round of austerity measures, which were described as "unprecedented". The proposed changes, which aimed to save €38 billion through 2012, represented the biggest government overhaul in a generation. The bill was met with a nationwide general strike and massive protests, leaving three dead, dozens injured and 107 arrested.

==== Vote ====
The bill was submitted to Parliament on 4 May and approved on 6 May. Out of 160 MPs consisting the PASOK government majority, 157 MPs supported the bill, while 3 MPs abstained. ND, SYRIZA and KKE voted against the bill; however, Dora Bakoyianni of ND voted for the bill in principle and was subsequently expelled from ND. LAOS voted for the bill.

Further separate votes on 29 and 30 June were held to implement portions of the package.

==== Specific measures ====
The measures include:

===== Public Sector Reform =====
- The number of public-owned companies shall be reduced from 6,000 to 2,000.
- Limit of €500 per month to 13th and 14th month salaries of public employees; abolished for employees receiving more than €3,000 a month.
- 8% cut on public sector allowances
- 3% pay cut for DEKO (public sector utilities) employees.
- Public sector limit of €1,000 introduced to bi-annual bonus, abolished entirely for those earning more than €3,000 a month.
- The number of municipalities shall shrink from 1,000 to 400.

===== Pension Reform =====
Public pension reforms included:

- Limit of €800 per month to 13th and 14th month pension instalments; abolished for pensioners receiving more than €2,500 a month.
- Return of a special tax on high pensions.
- Women's retirement age increased from 60 to 65 to match men's retirement age.
- Mechanism introduced to scale general pension age to life expectancy changes.
- Average retirement age for public sector workers increased from 61 to 65.

===== Tax Reform =====
- Value added tax rises to 23% (from 19%), 11% (from 9%) and 5.5% (from 4%).
- Extraordinary taxes imposed on company profits.
- Rise in the value of property (and thus higher taxes).
- 10% rise in luxury taxes and sin taxes on alcohol, cigarettes and fuel.
- 10% additional rise for all imported cars.

===== Labor Market Reforms =====
- Changes were planned to the laws governing lay-offs and overtime pay.
- A financial stability fund has been created.

==== Implementation ====
On 2 May 2010, a loan agreement was reached between Greece, the other eurozone countries, and the International Monetary Fund. The deal consisted of an immediate €45 billion in loans to be provided in 2010, with more funds available later. The first instalment covered €8.5 billion of Greek bonds that became due for repayment.

In total, €110 billion was agreed on. The interest for the eurozone loans is 5%, considered to be high for a bailout loan. The European Monetary Union loans would be pari passu and not senior like those of the IMF. The seniority of the IMF loans has no legal basis but is respected nonetheless. The loans should cover Greece's funding needs for the next three years (estimated at €30 billion for the rest of 2010 and €40 billion each for 2011 and 2012). According to EU officials, France and Germany demanded that their military dealings with Greece be a condition of their participation in the financial rescue. As of 12 May 2010, the deficit was down 40% from the previous year.

== 2011 ==
=== June ===
Fourth austerity package – "The Medium-term Programme"
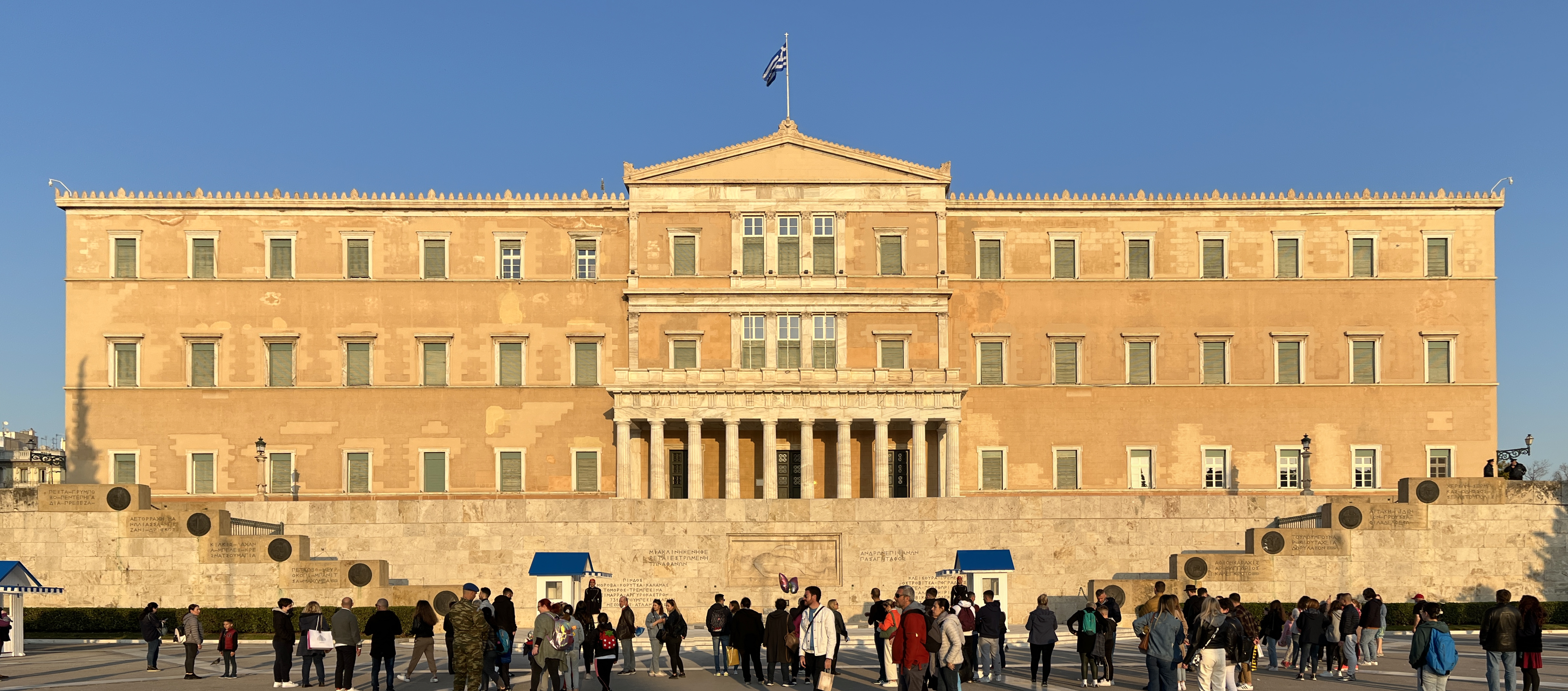

Hellenic Parliament
- Long title: Medium-term fiscal strategy 2012-15 (Law 3895/2011)
- Territorial extent: Greece
- Passed by: Hellenic Parliament
- Passed: 29 June 2011 (For: 155; Against: 138; 5 Abstentions)
- Introduced by: Government of Greece
- Status: In force

The fourth austerity package, commonly called "The Medium-term Programme" or "The June 2011 measures", was approved by the Hellenic Parliament in June 2011.

In the midst of public discontent, massive protests and a 24-hour-strike throughout Greece, the parliament debated a new austerity bill, known in Greece as the "mesoprothesmo" (the mid-term [plan]). The government's intent to pass further austerity measures was met with discontent from within the government and parliament, but eventually passed with 155 votes in favour (a marginal 5-seat majority). Horst Reichenbach headed up the task force overseeing Greek implementation of austerity and structural adjustment.

==== Measures ====
The new measures included:

- Raising €50 billion from privatisations and sales of government property.
- Tax Reform
  - Increasing taxes for those with a yearly income of more than €8,000
  - An extra tax for those with a yearly income of more than €12,000
  - Increasing value added tax in the housing industry
  - An extra tax of 2% for combating unemployment
- Pension Reform
  - Lower pension payments ranging from 6% to 14% from the previous 4% to 10%.
- Creation of a special agency responsible with exploiting government property, and others.

On 11 September 2011, the government introduced more taxes, this time targeted at people owning immovable property. The new tax, which was paid through the owner's electricity bill, affected 7.5 million Public Power Corporation accounts and ranged from 3 to 20 euros per square meter. The tax applied for 2011–2012 and was expected to raise €4 billion in revenue.

On 19 August 2011, the Greek Minister of Finance, Evangelos Venizelos, said that new austerity measures "should not be necessary". On 20 August 2011 it was revealed that the government's economic measures were still off track; government revenue went down by €1.9 billion while spending went up by €2.7 billion.

On a meeting with representatives of the country's economic sectors on 30 August 2011, the Prime Minister and the Minister of Finance acknowledged that some of the austerity measures were irrational, such as the high value added tax, and that they were forced to apply them by the EU.

=== October ===
Fifth austerity package – October 2011 measures
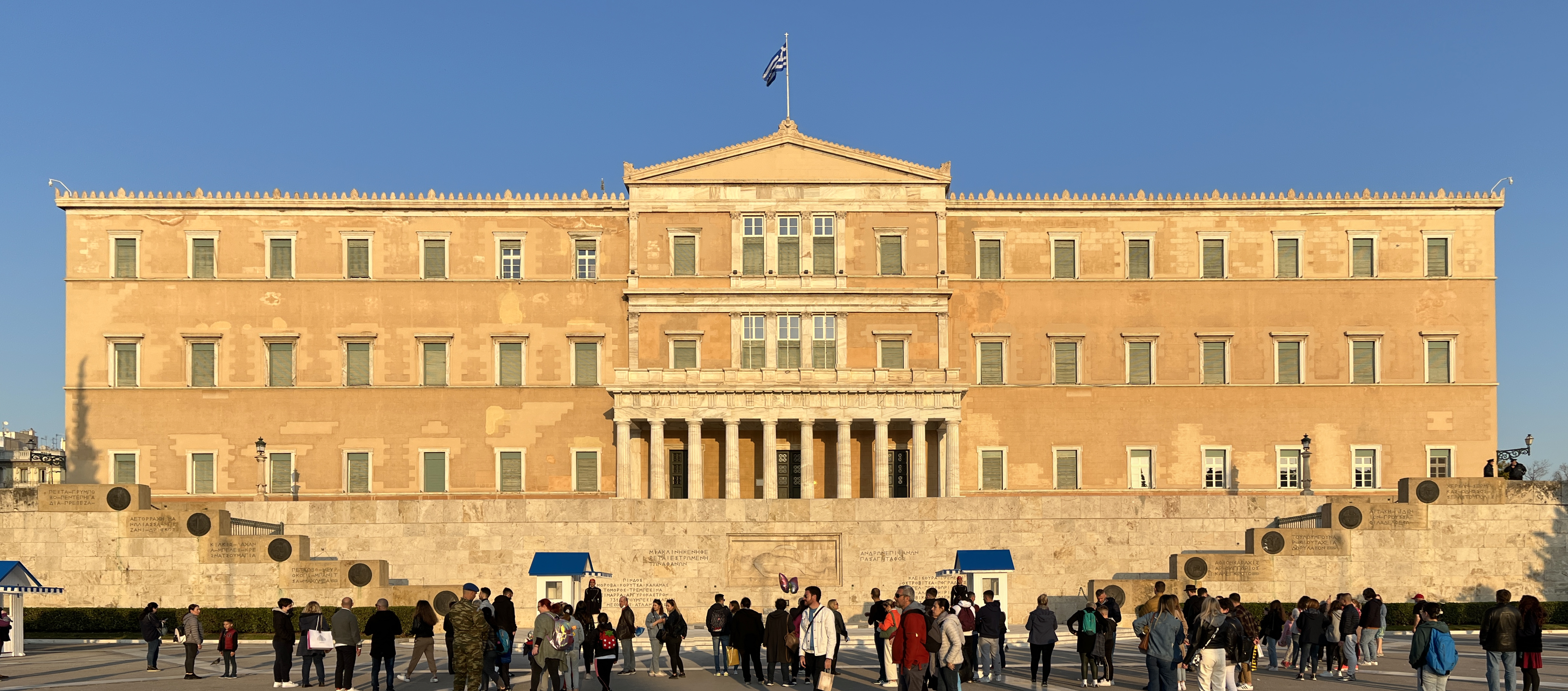

Hellenic Parliament
- Long title: Pension regulations, uniform pay scale - grading system, labour reserve and other provisions for the implementation of the Medium-term Fiscal Strategy Framework 2012–15 (Law 4024/2011)
- Territorial extent: Greece
- Passed by: Hellenic Parliament
- Passed: 20 October 2011 (For: 154; Against: 144)
- Introduced by: Government of Greece
- Status: In force

The fifth austerity package was aimed to ensure the 6th bailout instalment for Greece. The representatives of creditors required Greece to take new measures to limit state expenditures. That was one of the conditions so that the financing of Greek economy to continue normally. The new bill (called multi-bill) hit mostly civil servants and retirees. It was voted by the Greek parliament on 20 October 2011 amid protests. A man was killed during a demonstration at Syntagma Square. The major European countries then agreed on a reduction of Greek debt.

==== Measures ====
The package included:

- A uniform pay scale for civil servants. Wages cut by 30% and wages and bonuses were capped.
- Labor reserve offers civil servants who are dismissed 60% of their pay for one year.
- The tax-free threshold for income tax would be lowered from €12,000 to €5,000.
- Monthly pensions above €1,200 cut by 20%. Retirees under 55 years old, the pension over €1,000 is cut by 40%
- Lump sum for retirees is cut by 20% to 30%
- Education spending cut by closing or merging schools

== 2012 ==
=== February ===
Sixth austerity package – February 2012 measures
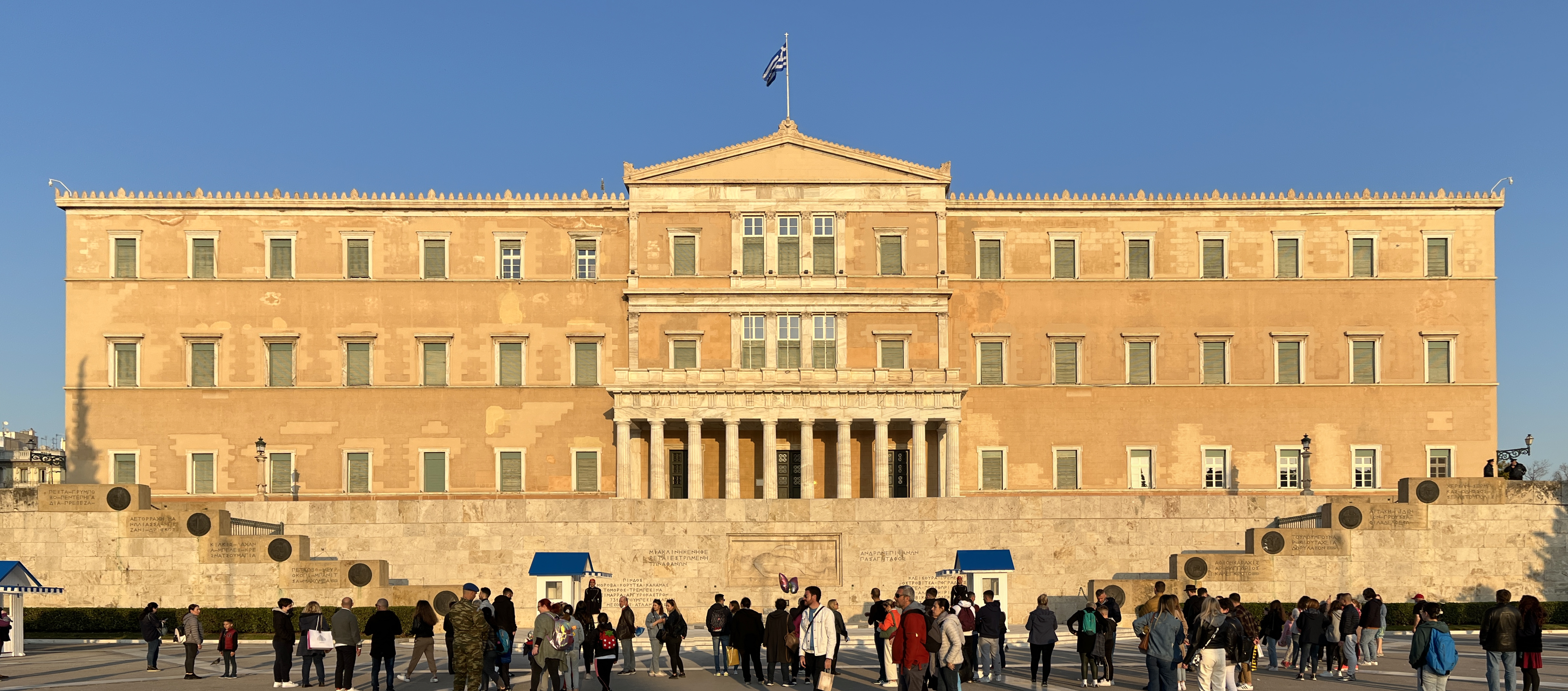

Hellenic Parliament
- Long title: Approval of Plans of Financial Facilitation between the European Financial Stability. Facility (E.F.S.F.), the Greek Republic and the Bank of Greece, the Plan of Memorandum of Understanding between the Greek Republic, the European Commission and the Bank of Greece and other urgent measures. (Law 4046/2012)
- Territorial extent: Greece
- Passed by: Hellenic Parliament
- Passed: 12 February 2012

Legislative history
- Introduced by: Government of Greece
- Passed: 12 February 2012
- Voting summary: 199 voted for; 74 voted against; 5 abstained
- Status: In force

The sixth austerity package was approved by the Hellenic Parliament in February 2012.

==== Negotiations ====
In October 2011, Papandreou got parliamentary backing for further austerity measures. These new measures would allow Greece to get an extra instalment of international loans, forming a second bailout package that would prevent a sovereign default and would allow the partial write-off of Greek debt, the so-called private sector involvement (PSI). As a result of this backing, the EU granted a quid pro quo of further austerity for a €100bn loan and a 50% debt reduction through PSI.

Within a week, Papandreou, backed unanimously by his cabinet, announced a referendum on the deal, sending shockwaves through financial markets. German chancellor Angela Merkel and French president Nicolas Sarkozy then issued an ultimatum declaring that, unless the referendum approved the measures, they would withhold an overdue €6bn loan payment to Athens, money that Greece needed by mid-December. Papandreou cancelled the referendum the next day after the opposition New Democracy Party, agreed to back the agreement.

On 10 November, Papandreou resigned following an agreement with the New Democracy party and the Popular Orthodox Rally to appoint a new prime minister to promulgate laws implementing the new measures that were agreed with the EU. The person chosen for this task was non-MP technocrat Lucas Papademos, former Governor of the Bank of Greece and former Vice-President of the European Central Bank; his appointment was criticised by left-wing parties and branded "unconstitutional". By contrast, three separate polls taken when Papademos assumed office revealed that around 75% of Greeks thought that temporary, emergency technocratic rule was "positive".

The EU insisted that whichever government was elected in 2012, it must honour the agreed upon EU-IMF austerity strategy. It thus demanded that Greek party-political leaders sign legally binding letters to this effect, as well as to any additional measures that might be required in future as part of the second rescue-package. Papademos argued in favour of signing, despite opposition from major pro-austerity factions in his government. Such letters would bind governments to austerity and structural adjustment through 2020. It was announced that the general election to replace Papademos' administration was to be delayed until April, or even May 2012 because more time was needed to finalise plans, as well as to complete negotiations over debt reduction.

Finalising the deal on the 50% PSI debt write-off, required by the Troika as a condition for extending more aid, proved difficult in early 2012, given objections primarily from hedge funds. In an interview with The New York Times, Papademos said that if his country did not receive unanimous agreement from its bondholders to voluntarily write down €100bn of Greek's €340bn debt, he would consider legislating to force bondholder losses, and that if things went well, Greeks could expect "an end to austerity" in 2013. Others believed that even the proposed 50% would not be enough to prevent a sovereign default.

==== Approval ====
In February, facing sovereign default, Greece needed more funds from the IMF and EU by 20 March, and was negotiating over a €130 billion lending package. On 10 February, the Greek cabinet approved the draft bill of a new austerity plan, which was calculated to improve the 2012 budget deficit with €3.3 billion (and a further €10 billion improvement scheduled for 2013 and 2014). The austerity plan includes:

- 22% cut in minimum wage from €750 to €585 per month
- Permanently cancel holiday wage bonuses (one extra month's pay each year)
- 150,000 jobs cut from state sector by 2015, including 15,000 by the end of 2012
- Pension cuts worth €300 million in 2012
- Changes to laws to make it easier to lay off workers
- Health and defence spending cuts
- Industry sectors are given the right to negotiate lower wages depending on economic development
- Opening up closed professions to allow for more competition, particularly in the health, tourism, and real estate sectors
- Privatisations worth €15 billion by 2015, including Greek gas companies DEPA and DESFA. In the medium term, the goal remains at €50 billion.

The latest round of austerity measures meant that Greece would face at least another year of recession before the economy started to grow again. Foreign observers were shocked by both the cold-heartedness of German negotiators and a perceived lack of integrity from Greece not honoring its commitments.

Showing disagreement, transport minister Makis Voridis from the Popular Orthodox Rally party, along with five deputy ministers from various ministries, resigned. On 11 February, Papademos warned of "social explosion and chaos" if the parliament did not approve the deal the next day. Speaking to members of Parliament before their vote, Papademos stated that if the majority voted against the austerity measures, the government would not be able to pay employee salaries. On 13 February, the Greek Parliament subsequently approved the measures 199 to 74. During the parliamentary debate, massive protests were witnessed in Athens that left stores looted and burned and more than 120 injured. The riot was one of the worst since 2010.

Despite its position as one of the ruling parties, the Popular Orthodox Rally voted against the plan and withdrew from the government. Forty-three MPs from the other two ruling parties (social democratic PASOK and conservative New Democracy) also voted against the plan and were immediately expelled from their parties. This reduced the combined power of these two parties from 236 to 193 seats, still enough for a majority of the 300-seat parliament. The vote was a major precondition for the EU and IMF to jointly release the funds, which are supposed to cover all financial needs in 2012 and 2013, with the hope that Greece can start lending again at the private capital markets in 2014.

The determination of the Greek leaders to implement the new austerity package was however doubted. For example, Antonis Samaras (leader of New Democracy) talked about renegotiating the deal, despite voting for the package. Because of this uncertainty, Eurozone finance ministers demanded that Greek main politicians sign a written assurance for their continued support to implement the austerity package, both before and after any elections.

After passing the package on 13 February, four other hurdles remained for Greece to receive the new €130 billion bailout loan:

- €325 million out of the total €3.3 billion austerity package for 2012 needed to be specified in the form of some exact "structural expenditure reductions", to be outlined and passed by a separate bill.
- Written commitments from the main party leaders had to be filed to guarantee their continued support for the program, both before and after elections in April.
- The debt restructure agreement, with a debt write-off worth €107 billion, needed to be implemented by a bond swap in early March, involving at least 95% of the private creditors. Under the terms, all the holders (banks, pension funds, insurers and others) of €206 billion in government bonds, would have to write down the face value of their holdings by 53.5%, by swapping bonds they held for longer-dated securities that pay a lower coupon. When calculated for the bonds with the longest maturity, the 53.5% reduction of face value would be equal to a 74% loss on the net present value of the debt. The agreement included a collective action clause to force recalcitrant holders to participate.
- A debt sustainability report by the Troika, based upon full implementation of the package and the debt agreement, needed to show a sustainable outlook for the Greek economy, reducing the debt relative to GDP to 120% in 2020.

=== October ===
Seventh austerity package – October/November 2012 measures
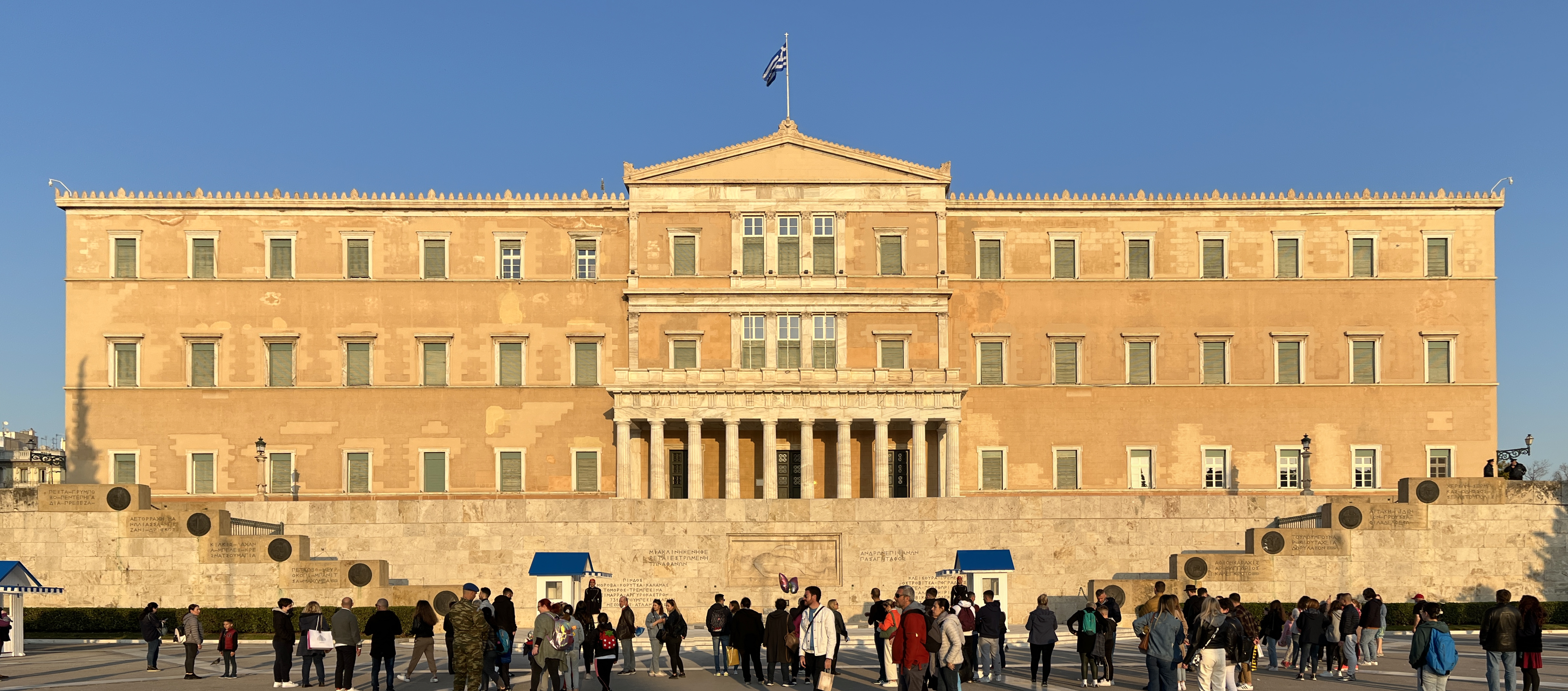

Hellenic Parliament
- Long title: Approval of the Medium Term Fiscal Strategy Plan 2013-2016, Urgent implementation measures of L.4046/2012 and the Medium Term Fiscal Strategy Framework 2013-2016. (Law 4093/2012)
- Territorial extent: Greece
- Passed by: Hellenic Parliament
- Passed: 31 October and 7/8 November 2012

Legislative history
- Introduced by: Government of Greece
- Passed: 31 October and 7/8 November 2012
- Voting summary: 153 voted for; 128 voted against; 18 abstained
- Status: In force

The seventh austerity package was approved by the Hellenic Parliament in October 2012.

==== Specific measures ====
Some of the main elements are:

- Bank recapitalisation
- Tax reform
- Labor market reform
- Pension reform
- The "Midterm fiscal plan 2013–16".

The fiscal plan is an extension of the initial bailout package, as it contain the framework for €5.3bn of additional measures (primarily tax hikes) to be implemented in 2015–16 along with the €13.5bn of measures for 2013–14. The extension (and accompanying agreement) were to be covered in more details by a new bailout program in November 2012

==== History ====
The package and reforms were outlined in the second bailout agreement (March 2012). Initially, the package only dealt with those €13.5bn of measures (comprising €10bn spending cuts and €3.5bn tax hikes) for implementation in fiscal year 2013 and 2014. According to the implementation plan of the second bailout agreement, the measures were expected to have been passed by the Greek parliament in June 2012.

The passage of the austerity package was delayed due to political turmoil. Two parliamentary elections were held, on 6 May and 17 June. Subsequent political calls prompted by a worsened recession asked for a two-year extension of the bailout programme, and for the politicians to settle the exact content of the measures. This was finalised on 29 October.

==== Negotiations ====
As of 1 October, the Troika and the government were negotiating a €13.5bn austerity package for 2013–14, of which €10bn was to be implemented as spending cuts and €3.5bn as tax hikes. The government's proposal was that the financial budget for 2013 should implement the first €7.3bn of spending cuts and €0.5bn of tax hikes; with the remaining cuts scheduled for 2014. According to earlier Troika statements, the report would depend on the level of ambition and seriousness of the government's measures and on the progress on structural reforms and privatisation.

The Troika on 2 October explained to the government that the points agreed to in the March 2012 bailout agreement had to be effected before the €31.5bn capital payment:

- €13.5 billion austerity package for 2013 and 2014, of which the Troika needed the government to deliver a specification of how they would achieve €1.5 billion spending cuts for 2013 (mostly related to cuts for the health sector, defence, reform of local authorities and public sector) and €2 billion measures scheduled for 2014 (mostly related to tax hikes).
- Four structural reforms:
  - Liberalization of professions previously legally protected against competition
  - Deregulation of goods, services and energy markets
  - Creation of a new body to manage state procurements
  - Merging health insurance providers with the National Organization for Healthcare Provision (EOPYY)

The Troika reportedly pushed for lower minimum wages and a 30% reduction of the compensation paid to dismissed employees. This proposal was rejected by the government. Another point of disagreement was whether 20,000 civil servants should be simply laid off (recommended by the Troika) or placed in a so-called "labor reserve scheme" at a reduced wage for two years before having their status re-evaluated (preferred by the government).

On 3 October, sources from the Greek Ministry of Finance revealed that the Troika had asked the government to frontload the austerity package with measures of €9.3bn in 2013 with the remaining €4.2bn to be implemented in 2014. The Troika expected a slightly worse GDP decline in 2013 compared to the government forecast and that the economy subsequently would recover faster if the austerity package frontloaded its savings for 2013. According to Kathimerini, the extra €0.6bn of increased savings in 2013 would most likely be found by removing all Christmas, Easter and summer bonus payments for civil servants, equal to €1000 per year for each civil servant.

According to Kathemerini's source, the Troika had also indicated they were willing to accept the large tranche of unspecified savings from structural reforms, if the government were ready to accept the frontload of the austerity package. IMF at the same time also called for a decision to liberalise the fuel sector, as their review report of the sector had concluded that Greeks on a yearly basis currently pay about $1bn more for fuel than they should.

The government attempted to sign a final deal with the Troika about the content and size of the austerity package and 2013 fiscal budget before the scheduled Eurogroup meeting on 8 October. If the Eurogroup approved the content of the negotiated deal, it would be submitted for a final approval by the European heads of state at the EU summit on 18 October. As the exact content of the package needed to be revealed before the Troika can reach its conclusion about the sustainability of the Greek economy, it was expected this important report appear in the first half of November.

On 17 October, the Troika released the following statement:

"The [Greek] authorities and [Troika] staff teams agreed on most of the core measures needed to restore the momentum of reform and pave the way for the completion of the review. Discussions on remaining issues would continue from respective headquarters and through technical representatives in the field with a view to reaching full staff level agreement over the coming days. Furthermore, financing issues would be discussed between the official lenders and Greece."

Responding statements from the government indicated that an agreement about core elements had been agreed. Disagreement remained about labor market reforms, with the government still resisting direct layoffs or wage/pension cuts for public workers. Another outstanding point was that the government requested that the Troika finance a two-year delay of the fiscal targets in the bailout plan, to avoid the need for the government to pass an additional austerity package (in addition to the €13.5bn) to reach the initial fiscal targets. It was likewise hoped that these additional disagreements could be settled during additional talks with headquarters.

At the EU summit on 19 October, it was announced the Eurogroup would arrange a conference call on 29 October to approve the final version of the austerity package, and provided this package subsequently was passed by the Greek parliament before 11 November, the Eurogroup was ready to make the decision at their ordinary meeting at 12 November to accept the release of the bailout funds.

=== 16 October to 12 November ===
- 16 Oct: Details for the bank recapitalisation were presented. The size of the recapitalisation was a potential €48bn, of which the first €18bn had already injected into the four biggest banks in the first half of 2012. The remaining recapitalisation was to be performed in three stages. At first the Hellenic Financial Stability Fund (HFSF) would immediately inject capital to the banks to reach the required 9% capital ratio. At the second stage HFSF would provide financial tools until the end of January, and at the third stage the permanent capital increases should be covered by the private sector by the end of April 2013. Banks with remaining capital inadequacies would find a solution before mid-June 2013. The 3 biggest systemic banks would get the remaining capital amounts covered by HFSF through the issue of common shares (where HFSF in return would pay the banks with EFSF bonds), while smaller banks would have to be either liquidated by HFSF or bought by other banks. The plan is for private shareholders to retain administrative control of the systemic banks, so during the next five years they would have the right at any time to buy back the shares from HFSF. Apparently the Troika have dropped their previous requirement for the capital ratios to be further increased to 10% by the end of June 2013.
- 19 Oct: A new reform of the tax system was presented, with a flat rate 28% income tax for self-employed and enterprises, and a general 50% reduction in tax exemptions on property transactions, inheritances and parental donations. Starting from January 2013, all property owners would on a yearly basis have to pay the same single rate for property tax. The tax-free bonus for families with children would be abolished, and a ceiling would be introduced on exempted expenditures related to healthcare. Another major change is that all social benefits (previously exempted) would be taxed as salary revenues. For corporations the biggest change was that the tax-free threshold of €5,000 per year would be abolished. All in all, the tax reform is expected to increase the government revenues by €3bn per year.
- 29 Oct: The Eurogroup working group held an extraordinary meeting to discuss the current debt sustainability in Greece, and potential solutions to improve it. It was decided to reject the call from the Democratic Left to attempt a further revision of the already negotiated labor market reform.
- 29 Oct: The government signed a new act that would assign Greek Finance Ministry inspectors to monitor public expenditures for all those ministries and state bodies that do not comply with fiscal targets. The act also introduced an automatic mechanism giving the Finance Ministry power to immediately stop excessive expenditures.
- 30 Oct: Prime minister Antonis Samaras announced the Troika negotiations about the fiscal plan 2013–16 and labor market reform had been successfully concluded, and was a subject for parliamentary approval the following week. The PASOK/New Democracy majority agreed to support the entire package. Democratic Left stated "We are not in agreement with the conclusion of the negotiations", and as a last resort would now attempt to "force the situation" by asking the eurozone leaders to overrule the Troika negotiators resistance to change essential parts of the labor market reform.
- 30 Oct: The country's privatisation agency revised the previous revenue target from €19bn by the end of 2015, to only €11bn by the end of 2016. The revenues collected from the privatisation program was in March 2012 forecasted not only to reduce the debt by €50bn, but also to generate an extra €60bn investments from the buyers, resulting in €3bn extra annual tax revenues for the government and 50,000 jobs; raising annual GDP growth by 1%. During the first 2.5 years after the May 2010 bailout, Greece had managed to sell public assets only worth €1.6bn.
- 31 Oct: A reform package to enable privatisations was narrowly passed. 30 MPs from PASOK and Democratic Left abstained.
- 31 Oct: A reform proposal to merge the social security funds of journalists, civil engineers, lawyers and others with the National Organization for Healthcare Provision (EOPYY), did not pass.
- 31 Oct: The Eurogroup noted significant progress had been made paving the way for a full staff level agreement between the Troika and the government. If certain actions were conducted by the Greek authorities, the Eurogroup would seek to finalize the Greek programme on 12 November.
- 31 Oct: The government presented a worsened forecast for 2012 and 2013, with real GDP expected to decline by 6.5% and 4.5% respectively, while the debt-to-GDP ratio expected to reach 175.6% in 2012 and 189.1% in 2013.
- 31 Oct: The government submitted the Midterm fiscal plan for 2013–16 to the parliament, with €18.8bn of austerity measures scheduled ov erfour years. The package is frontloaded, meaning the measures would be implemented with: €9.3bn (2013), €4.1bn (2014), €1.9bn (2015), €2.7bn (2016). The measures include an increase in retirement age from 65 to 67 years, salary and pension cuts, and another round of tax increases. A vote for the plan is scheduled on 7 November, while the parliament would vote on the related 2013 Fiscal budget on 11 November.
- 01 Nov: Export sector reform with a bucket of 19 measures, was presented by the government. It seeks to reduce administration costs for the export sector with 20% by 2015 (where a reduction of export fees is one of the direct saving measures), and halving the time to process exports through simplified approval procedures (i.e. by introducing the "Single Window" to operate as a one-stop-shop service). The reform was expected to boost the value of exported goods 10%, while also creating 80,000 jobs and resulting in an extra GDP growth of 1.7%.
- 06 Nov: The two biggest labour unions started a 48-hour-long general strike in protest of the austerity measures and the labor market reform.
- 07 Nov: The Greek parliament voted for the labor market reform, the proposal for merging various social security funds with the National Organization for Healthcare Provision (EOPYY) and the Midterm fiscal plan 2013–16. New Democracy and PASOK had to dismiss respectively 1 MP and 6 MPs (of which 4 had abstained, 1 opted to be absent, and 2 voted against), reducing the combined majority of the two parties to 153. As 14 out of 16 MPs from Democratic Left abstained, they would continue to be part of the coalition and they pledged to support and vote for the austerity-packed 2013 Fiscal budget on 11 November.
- 08 Nov: The Eurogroup held an extraordinary meeting. Final decisions were postponed to 12 November.
- 11 Nov: The Greek parliament was scheduled to vote for the 2013 Fiscal budget. Ahead of the vote, PASOK lost another MP who abandoned the party line, thus lowering the tally of PASOK MPs to 26. Two of the previously excluded MPs from New Democracy and PASOK unexpectedly decided to back the bill, while 1 MP from Democratic Left was absent, the bill by the end of the day passed. One New Democracy MP voted against the amendment concerning the extra labour market measures and was excelled from the party, lowering its number of MPs to 125, and reducing the combined majority with PASOK to 151 MPs.
- 11 Nov: A draft version of the almost completed and long-awaited Troika surveillance report appeared that outlined the results for the Greek economy, reforms, privatisation programme and debt sustainability. Among other things it claimed that the two-year extension of the bailout programme would cost €32.6bn of extra loans from the Troika (€15bn in 2013–14 and €17.6bn in 2015–16).
- 12 Nov: Eurogroup and IMF agreed to consider a revised bailout plan. The Eurogroup proposed prolonged maturities and lower interest rates on existing loans and/or a debt-buy-back of the remaining privately held government bonds, then listed with a face value of €63bn. The debt-buy-back would in practical terms mean that the Troika would buy all the remaining privately held bonds at a price close to the market price; an operation that would need the acceptance of private investors to sell at the offered price. If all private investors accepted a debt-buy-back at 30% of face value, it would require the Troika to issue €18.9bn of new debt to finance the transaction, resulting in a net debt reduction for Greece at €44.1bn (equal to a debt-to-GDP ratio decline of 23%).

The crucial passage of the Labor market reform, Midterm fiscal plan 2013–16 and Fiscal budget 2013 resulted in the exclusion of several MPs from the three coalition parties. New Democracy lost 4 of 125, PASOK lost 7 of 26 and Democratic Left lost 3 of 14. The combined majority was reduced to 165/300 and that the majority for the two most reform-friendly parties was only 151 MPs.

=== Parliament approval ===
On 7 November, amidst protests of tens of thousands of people, the Greek parliament narrowly approved another austerity package worth €13.5 billion. Without the vote, the Troika warned, the next instalment of €31.5 billion in financial aid would not be granted. Samaras told MPs that this package was "definitely the last", though some commentators immediately disagreed.

The latest measures cut pension on average between 5% and 15% and increased the retirement age from 65 to 67. Wages of civil servants were cut again by up to 20%. Some workers from the public sector would lose as much as 30% of their salaries.

== 2013 ==
Eighth austerity package – April/July 2013 measures
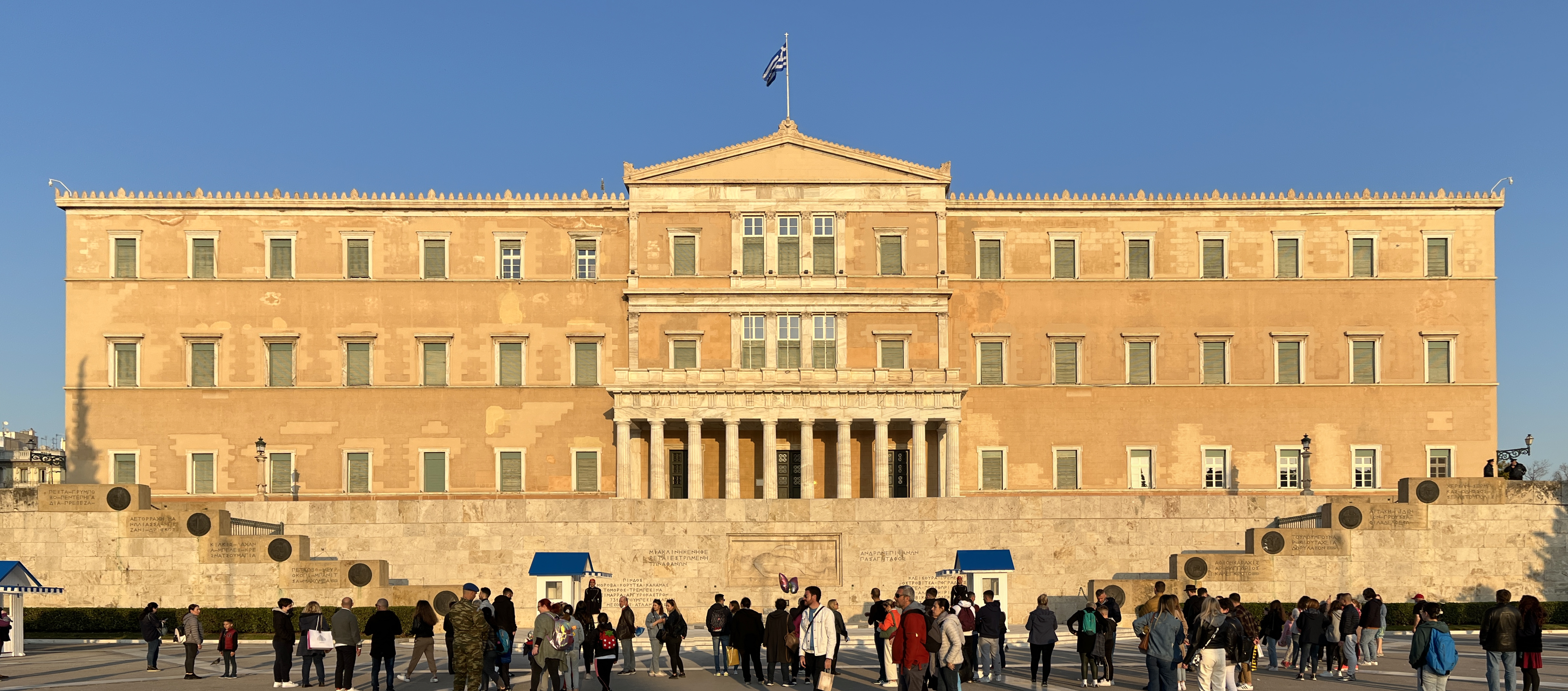

Hellenic Parliament
- Long title: 1. Urgent measures on the application of Laws 4046/2012,. 4093/2012 and 4127/2013 (Law 4152/2013); 2. Income taxation, urgent measures for the implementation of law 4046/2012, of law 4093/2012 and of law 4127/2013 and other provisions. (Law 4172/2013)
- Territorial extent: Greece
- Passed by: Hellenic Parliament
- Passed: 28 April 2013 and 17 July 2013
- Introduced by: Government of Greece
- Status: In force

The eighth austerity package included two multi-bills.

=== April ===
The first multi-bill was approved by Greek parliament on 28 April, receiving 168 votes. The law created a new tax for immovable property that would be defined later. The teachers reacted to the bill by declaring strikes. However, the government prohibited the strikes, proceeding to implement Civil mobilization.

=== July ===
On 17 July, the Greek Parliament approved an eighth austerity package to secure payment of its next €2.5 billion credit tranche. The laid off another 15,000 public employees, among them high school teachers, school guards and municipal policemen. Democratic Left (DIMAR) had withdrawn from the governing coalition in June. The package received 153 votes. The next day, a general ban on demonstrations was enacted and 4,000 police officers mobilized to avoid larger protests in the Greek capital during Schäuble's visit.

== 2014 ==
Ninth austerity package – May 2014 measures
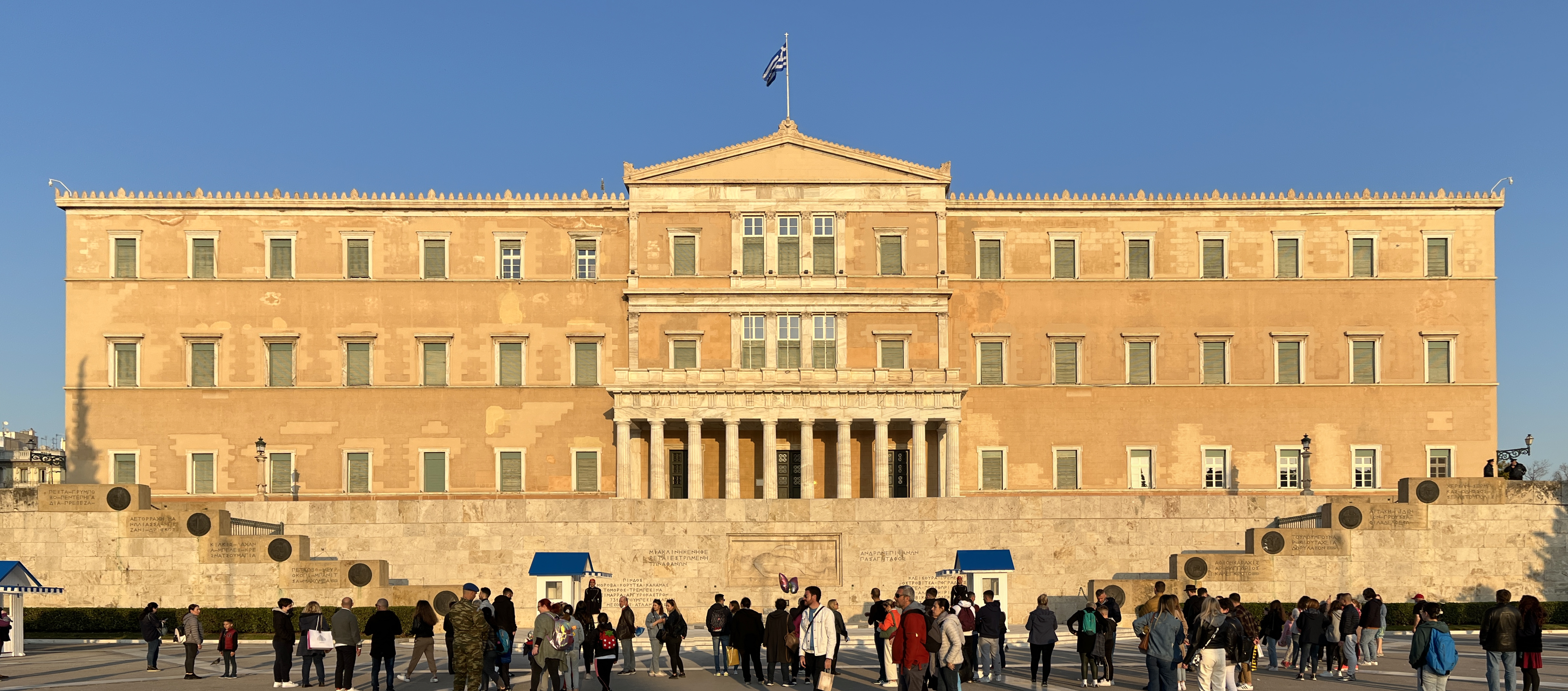

Hellenic Parliament
- Long title: Medium-term Fiscal Strategy plan 2015-2018 (Law 4263/2014)
- Territorial extent: Greece
- Passed by: Hellenic Parliament
- Passed: 9 May 2014 (For: 150; Against: 119)
- Assented to: 13 May 2014
- Commenced: 14 May 2014

Legislative history
- Introduced by: Government of Greece
- Introduced: 30 April 2014
- Passed: 14 May 2014
- Voting summary: 150 voted for; 119 voted against
- Committee report: Report of the Standing Committee of Financial Affairs
- Status: In force

The ninth austerity package was approved by Parliament on 9 May with 150 votes. It included provisions about Greek economic policy during the following four years. The bill's title was Medium-term Fiscal Strategy plan 2015-2018 and the relevant law is 4263/2014.

The bill froze wages and pensions until 2018. It cut public sector expenses, such as the Ministry of Health. It provided that the primary surplus in 2014 would be 2.3% of GDP (€4.19 billion) 5.3% (€11.585 billion) in 2018.

== 2015 ==
Tenth austerity package – July 2015 measures
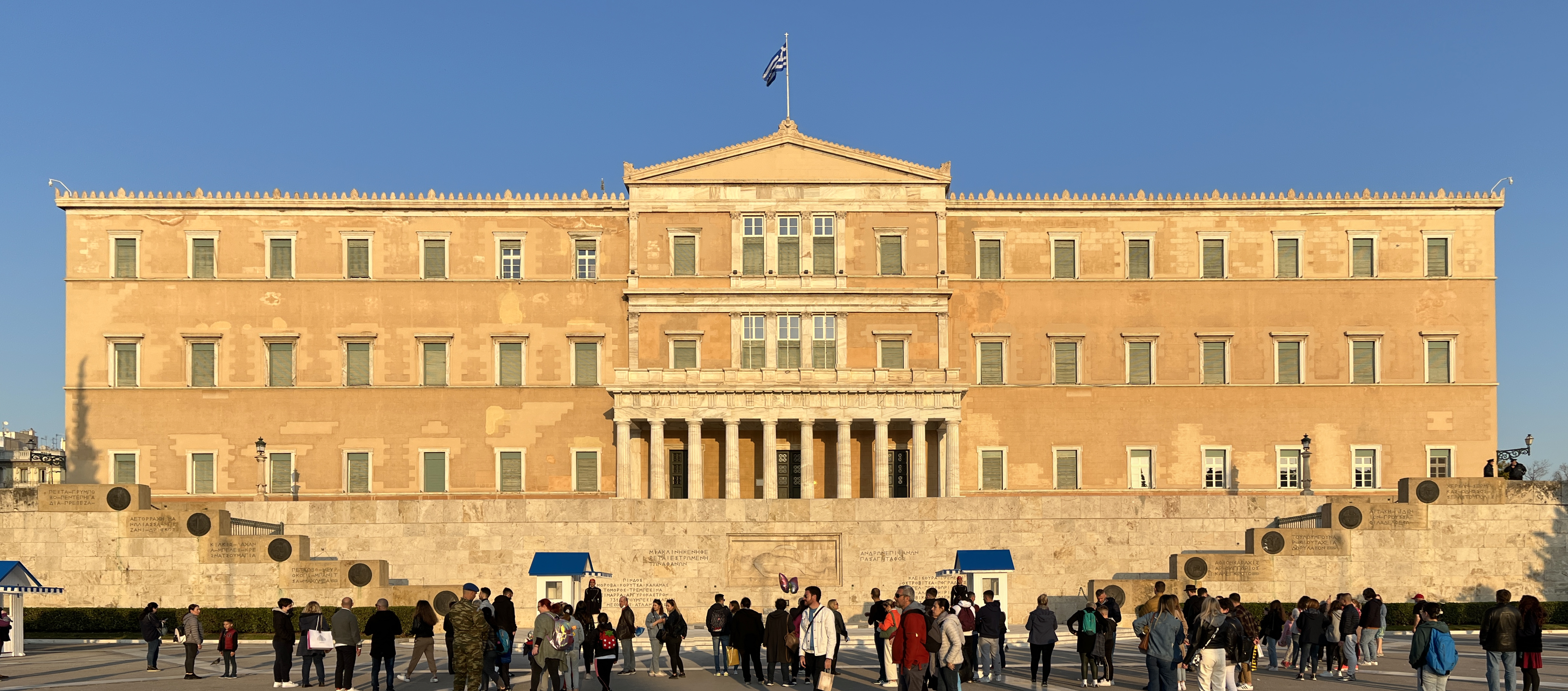

Hellenic Parliament
- Long title: Urgent prerequisites for the negotiation and conclusion of an agreement with the European Stability Mechanism (E.S.M) (Law 4334/2015)
- Territorial extent: Greece
- Passed by: Hellenic Parliament
- Passed: 15 July 2015
- Assented to: 16 July 2015
- Commenced: 16 July 2015

Legislative history
- Introduced by: Government of Greece
- Passed: 15 July 2015
- Voting summary: 229 voted for; 64 voted against; 6 abstained
- Status: In force

Tenth austerity package – July 2015 measures implementation law
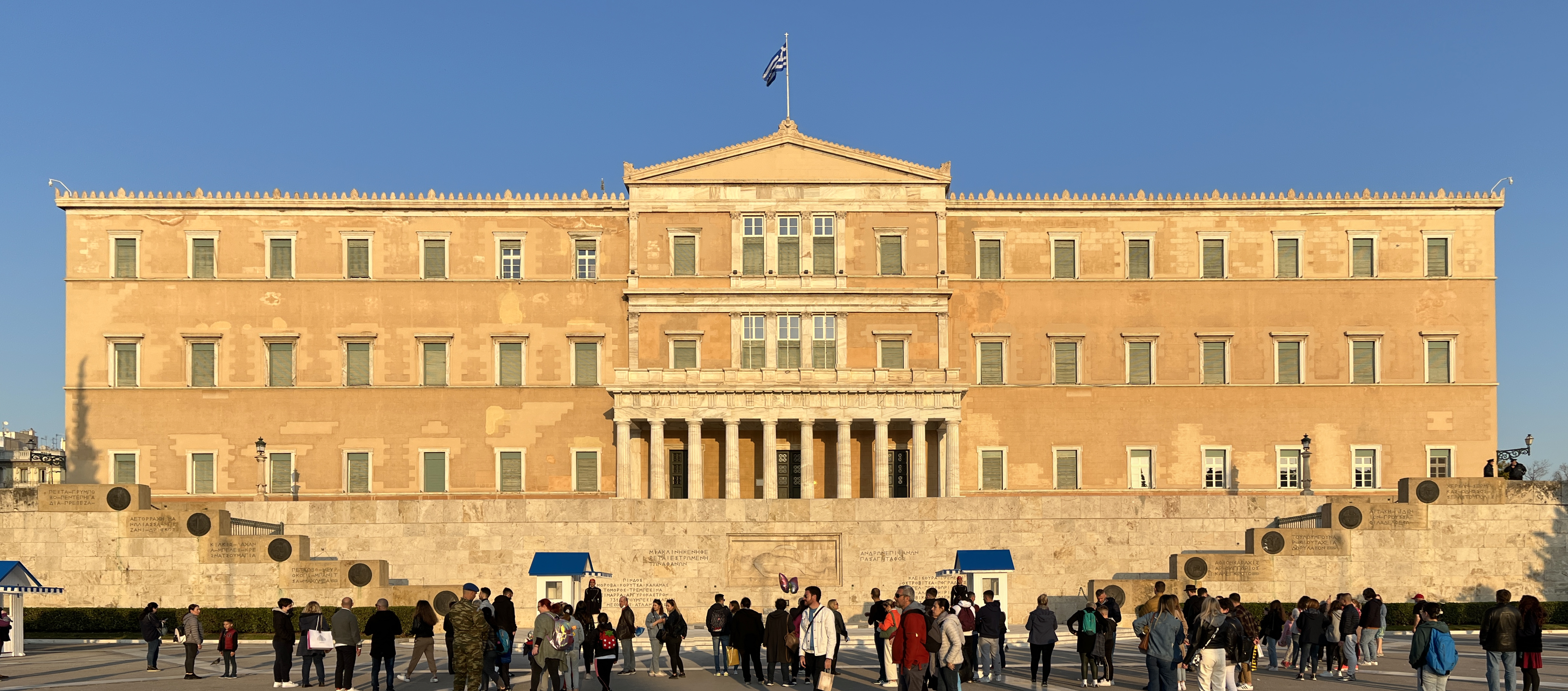

Hellenic Parliament
- Long title: Urgent measures for the implementation of Law 4334/2015 (Law 4335/2015)
- Territorial extent: Greece
- Passed by: Hellenic Parliament
- Passed: 22 July 2015
- Assented to: 23 July 2015
- Commenced: 23 July 2015

Legislative history
- Introduced by: Government of Greece
- Passed: 22 July 2015
- Voting summary: 230 voted for; 63 voted against; 5 abstained
- Status: In force

The parliament failed to elect a president and the Samaras Cabinet collapsed. The election took place on 25 January and the left-wing party Syriza won the election. The new government tried to adopt anti-austerity politics. In the first quarter of 2015 the Greek economy returned to recession. The deterioration of economy forced the government to accept another bailout, known as the Third Economic Adjustment Programme for Greece known as Third Memorandum. This bailout required a new austerity package.

The first round of measures was approved by the Greek parliament on 16 July 2015. The measures include:

- Transfer of many products to the high rate value added tax (23%). The lower 13% rate covers fresh food, energy, water and hotel stays. 6% rate covers medicines and press.
- Abolition of the value added tax discount of 30% for the most tourism-popular Greek islands, after 1 October 2015
- Rise of tax for incomes over €50,000
- Corporation tax rise from 26% to 29% for small companies
- Luxury tax rise
- Rise of health contributions paid by pensioners (6% from 4% )
- End to early retirement by 2022 and a retirement age increase to 67

The second set of measures passed on 23 July changed the Code of Civil Procedure.

=== August ===
Eleventh austerity package – August 2015 measures
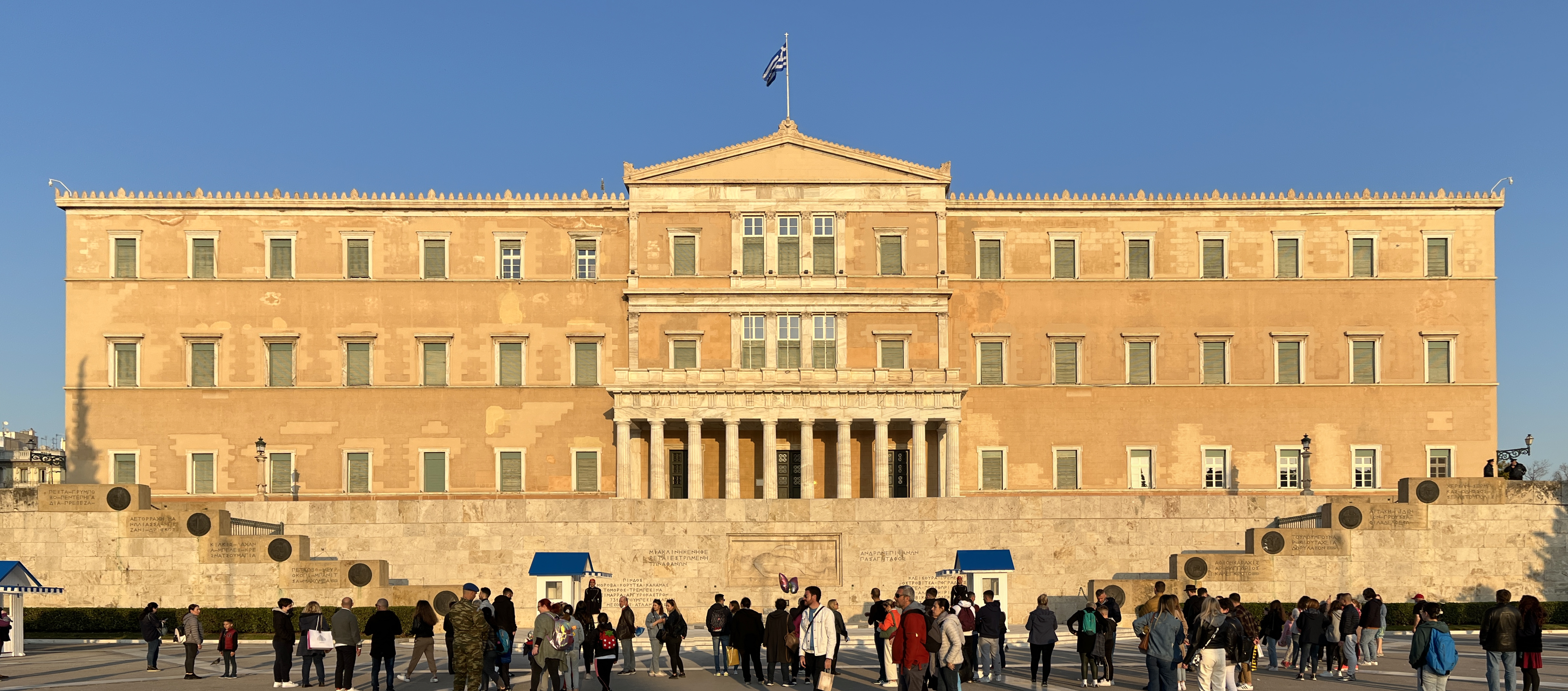

Hellenic Parliament
- Long title: Ratification of the Financial Assistance Draft Contract by the ESM and provisions for the implementation of the Financing Agreement (Law 4336/2015)
- Territorial extent: Greece
- Passed by: Hellenic Parliament
- Passed: 14 August 2015

Legislative history
- Introduced by: Government of Greece
- Introduced: 13 August 2015
- First reading: 13 August 2015
- Second reading: 13 August 2015
- Third reading: 14 August 2015
- Voting summary: 222 voted for; 64 voted against; 11 abstained
- Committee report: Joint Report of the Committees of Finances, Social Affairs, Production and Trade, Public Administration and Justice

Amended by
- 'Amendment 232/26 On public pensions Amendment 233/27 Judicial procedures, Arrangements for over-indebted citizens
- Status: In force

The eleventh austerity package was voted by the Greek Parliament as part of the agreement between the Tsipras Government and the "quartet" of creditors (the IMF, ECB, ESM and EU) for a third loan. The law contains two parts. The first was the loan agreement while the second contained the measures agreed to secure the first tranche of the new loan.

It was tabled by the government on 13 August 2015 and was approved by parliament on 14 August 2015 with 222 votes for and 64 against. It included provisions about Greek economic policy during the three next years. The bill's title was Ratification of the Financial Assistance Draft Contract by the ESM and provisions for the implementation of the Financing Agreement.

==== Vote in Parliament ====
The Government tabled the Bill containing the measures and the loan agreement in the afternoon of August 13 and requested that it be discussed under the extremely urgent Parliamentary procedure. The bill passed the committees on August 13 and was discussed in the plenary session between 2am and 10am of August 14. At 6am, the MPs decided by vote to shorten the discussion, thus the vote was held earlier than envisioned by the Standing Orders regarding extremely urgent procedures, at 10am.

==== Measures ====
The measures passed by this bill were the following:

- Diesel fuel tax for farmers going from €66 per 1,000 liters to €200/1,000 liters from 1 October 2015, and to €330 by 1 October 2016.
- Farmers' income tax to be paid in advance would rise from 27.5 percent to 55 percent.
- Income tax for farmers is set to rise from 13 to 20 percent for 2016 and to 26 percent for 2017.
- Freelancers would be subject to a gradual increase from 55 to 75 percent in advanced tax payments for income earned in 2015, increasing to 100 percent in 2016. The 2 percent tax break for single payments on income tax is also being abolished from 1 January 2015.
- Private education, previously untaxed, would be taxed at 23 percent, including the tutoring schools (frontistiria), but excluding preschools.
- Reduced value-added tax rates for islands are to be abolished completely by the end of 2016, with enforcement staggered across three groups of islands from 1 October 2015 to 1 January 2017.
- Interest on expired debts to the state that are payable in 100 installments is to rise from 3 percent to 5 percent on amounts over €5,000. Amounts below €5,000 are not subject to interest provided they meet certain conditions.
- Greece’s shipping industry would also be subject to new tax rises. Among other measures, tonnage tax is to increase by 4 percent annually between 2016 and 2020. A special contribution by foreign cargo carriers would remain in place until 2019.

=== October ===
Twelfth austerity package – October 2015 measures
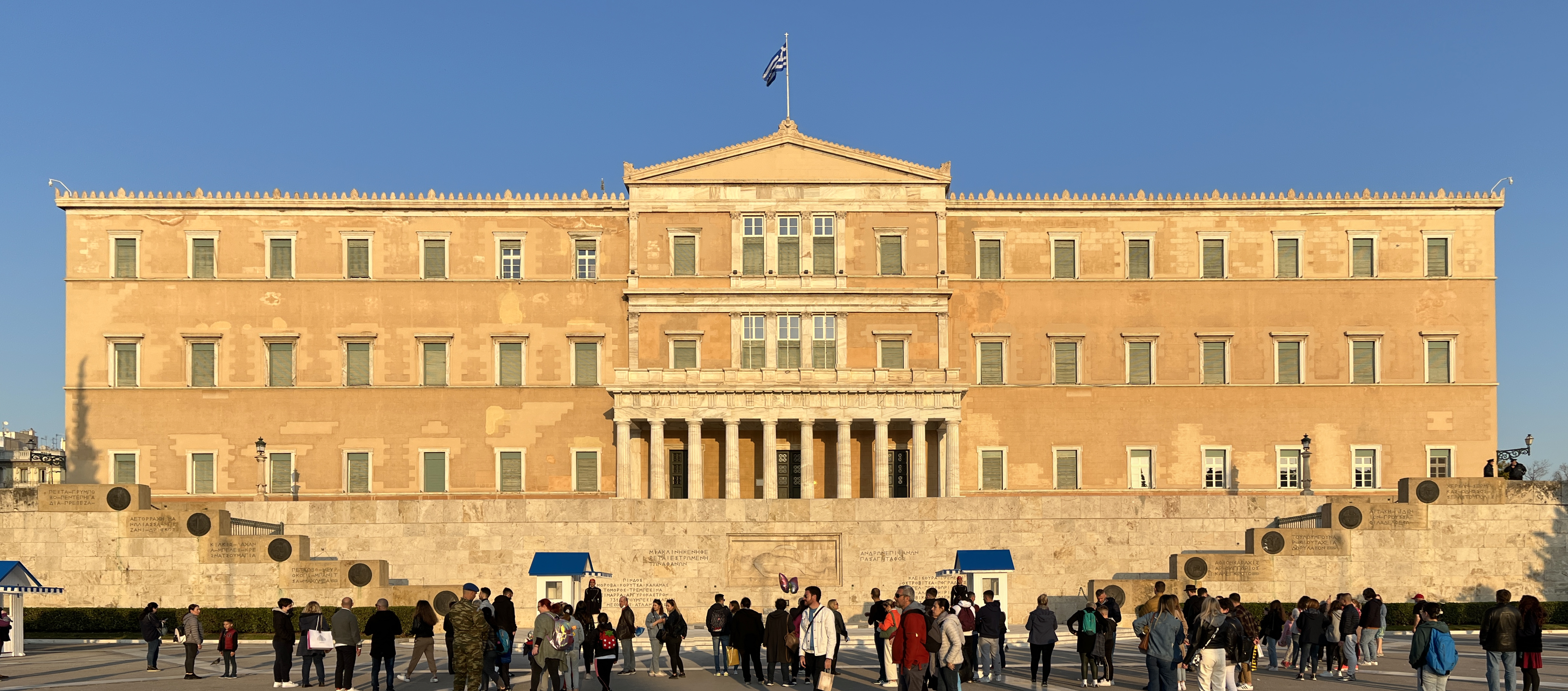

Hellenic Parliament
- Long title: Measures for the implementation of fiscal targets and structural reforms (Law 4337/2015)
- Territorial extent: Greece
- Passed by: Hellenic Parliament
- Passed: 16 October 2015

Legislative history
- Introduced by: Government of Greece
- Introduced: 12 October 2015
- First reading: 12 October 2015
- Second reading: 13 October 2015
- Third reading: 16 October 2015
- Voting summary: 154 voted for; 140 voted against
- Committee report: Joint Report of the Committees of Finances, Social Affairs and Production and Trade

Amended by
- Amendment 4/4 Tax investigation statute of limitations extension
- Status: In force

Twelfth austerity package (B) – November 2015 measures
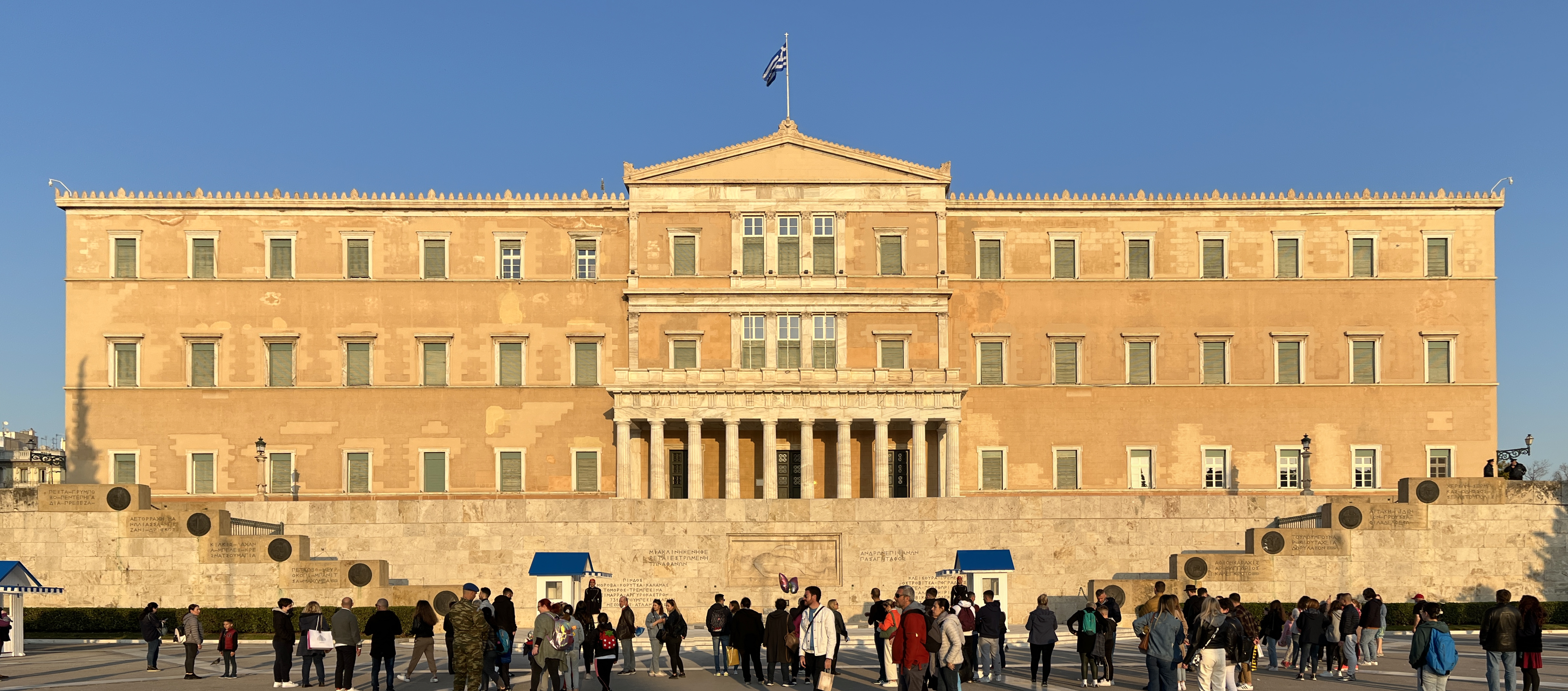

Hellenic Parliament
- Long title: Pension regulations, incorporation into Greek law of Directive 2012/27/EE of the European Parliament and of the Council of 25 October 2012, "For energy efficiency, the amending of Directives 2009/125/EC and 2010/30/EU and the repealing of Directives 2004/8/EC and 2006/32/EC, as amended by Directive 2013/12/EU of the Council of 13 May 2013 "For the adaption of Directive 2012/27/EU of the European Parliament and the Council for energy efficiency, due to the accession of the Republic of Croatia" and other provisions.
- Territorial extent: Greece
- Enacted by: Hellenic Parliament

Legislative history
- Introduced by: Government of Greece
- Introduced: 29 October 2015
- First reading: 29 October 2015
- Second reading: 30 October 2015
- Third reading: Pending

The twelfth austerity package was passed as part of the agreement between the Tsipras Government and the 'quartet' of creditors (the IMF, ECB, ESM and EU) for a third loan. The first round of bills passed on 16 October 2015 with 154 votes.

==== Measures ====
The measures passed were:

- Law 3865/2010 extended to the public sector
- Pensions calculated as the sum of basic and contributory pensions
- Minimum pension age raised to 67 retroactive to 1 July 2015
- Existing public sector pensioners younger than 67 received a 10% decrease in their pensions until they reach that age (excluding disability pensions).
- Armed forces pensions revert to the 3865/2010 Law regime. Veterans eligible at 61 years of age, or after 40 years of service.
- ΑΚΑΓΕ special auxiliary pension fund abolished
- Law 4331/2015 Law nullified
- Non-payment of the OAEE and ETAA social security obligation reinstated as a penal offense

== 2016 ==
Thirteenth austerity package – May 2016 pension measures
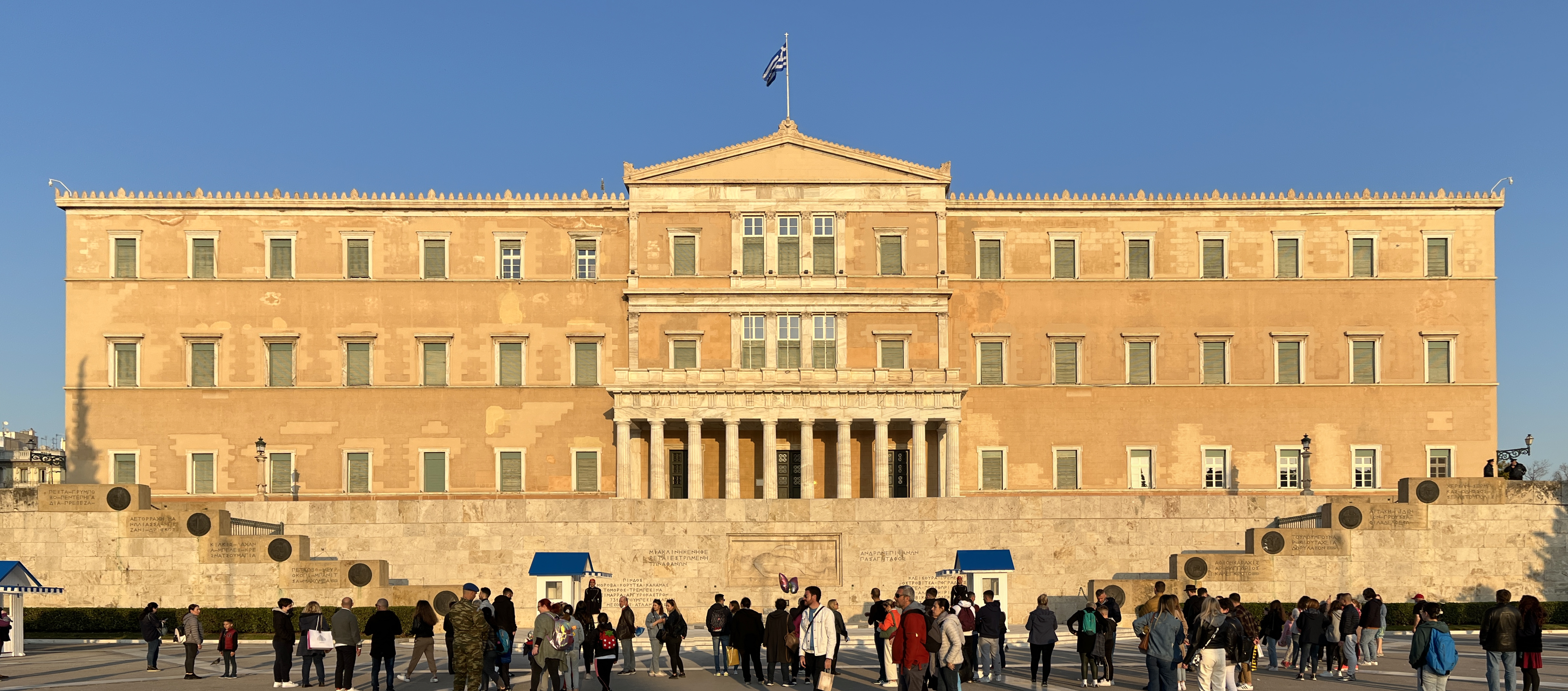

Hellenic Parliament
- Territorial extent: Greece
- Passed by: Hellenic Parliament
- Passed: 8 May 2016

Legislative history
- Introduced by: Government of Greece
- Passed: 8 May 2016
- Voting summary: 153 voted for; 144 voted against
- Status: In force

Thirteenth austerity package – May 2016 tax measures
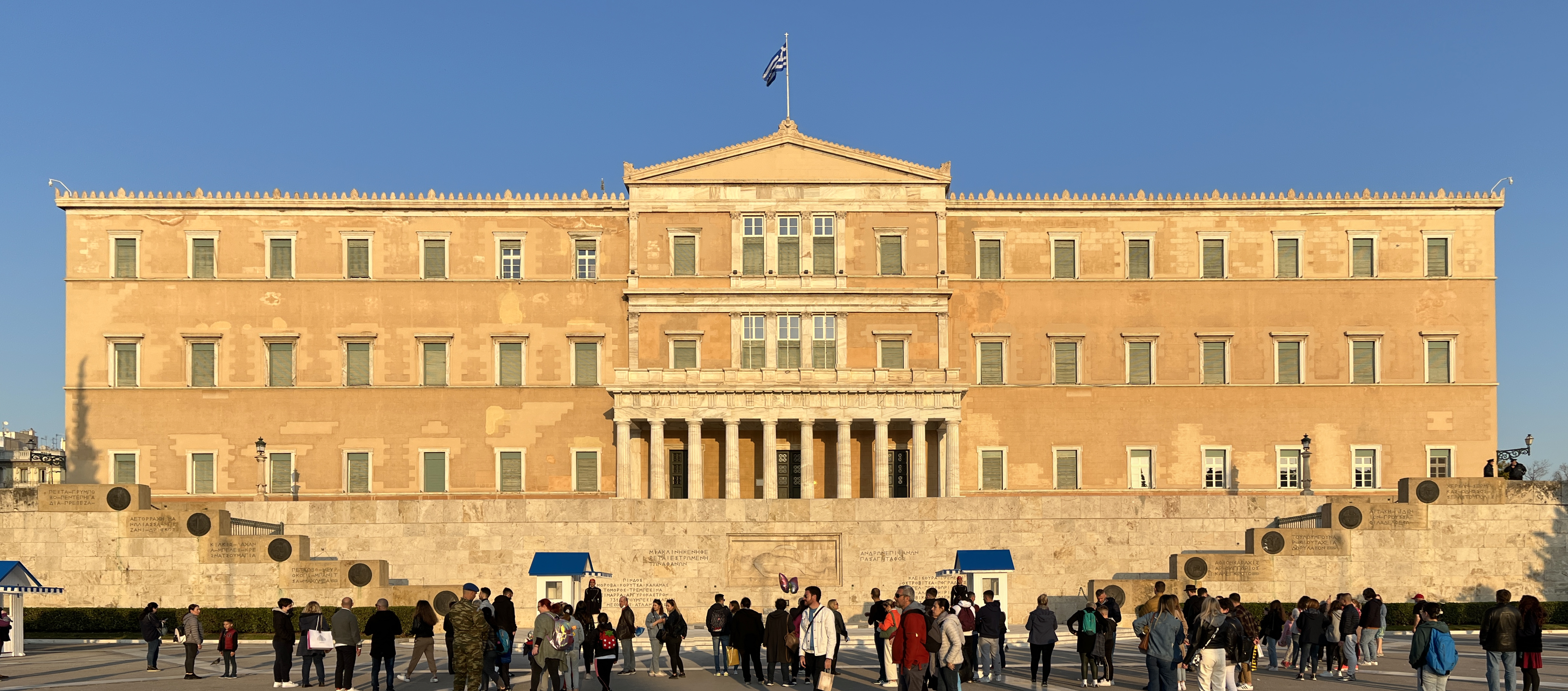

Hellenic Parliament
- Territorial extent: Greece
- Passed by: Hellenic Parliament
- Passed: 22 May 2016

Legislative history
- Introduced by: Government of Greece
- Passed: 22 May 2016
- Voting summary: 153 voted for; 145 voted against
- Status: In force

The thirteenth austerity package is a part of the agreed measures between government and IMF, EU, ECM for an 86-billion-euro bailout. The package was voted upon in two rounds. The first round passed on 8 May with 153 votes amidst demonstrations.

It includes another €5.4 billion in pension cuts and tax reforms. The measures aim to achieve a 3.5 percent primary budget surplus target in 2018.

=== First set ===
The first round of measures mostly affected pensions saving €3.6 billion. The measures voted on 8 May include:

- Cuts in new pensions
- Reducing higher pensions
- Increased insurance contributions

=== Second set ===
The second round of measures included €1.8 billion in new taxes and the creation of a contingency spending cuts mechanism (cutter mechanism). The vote was on 22 May, with 153 votes in favour.

- Value added tax increased to 24 percent
- Higher fuel taxes
- New excise taxes, such as coffee and electronic cigarettes
- increased excise taxes on tobacco and ENFIA tax
- Tourism tax affecting hotels from 2 stars and up
- Tax on TV subscriptions, landlines and internet broadband connections

== 2017 ==
Fourteenth austerity package – May 2017 measures
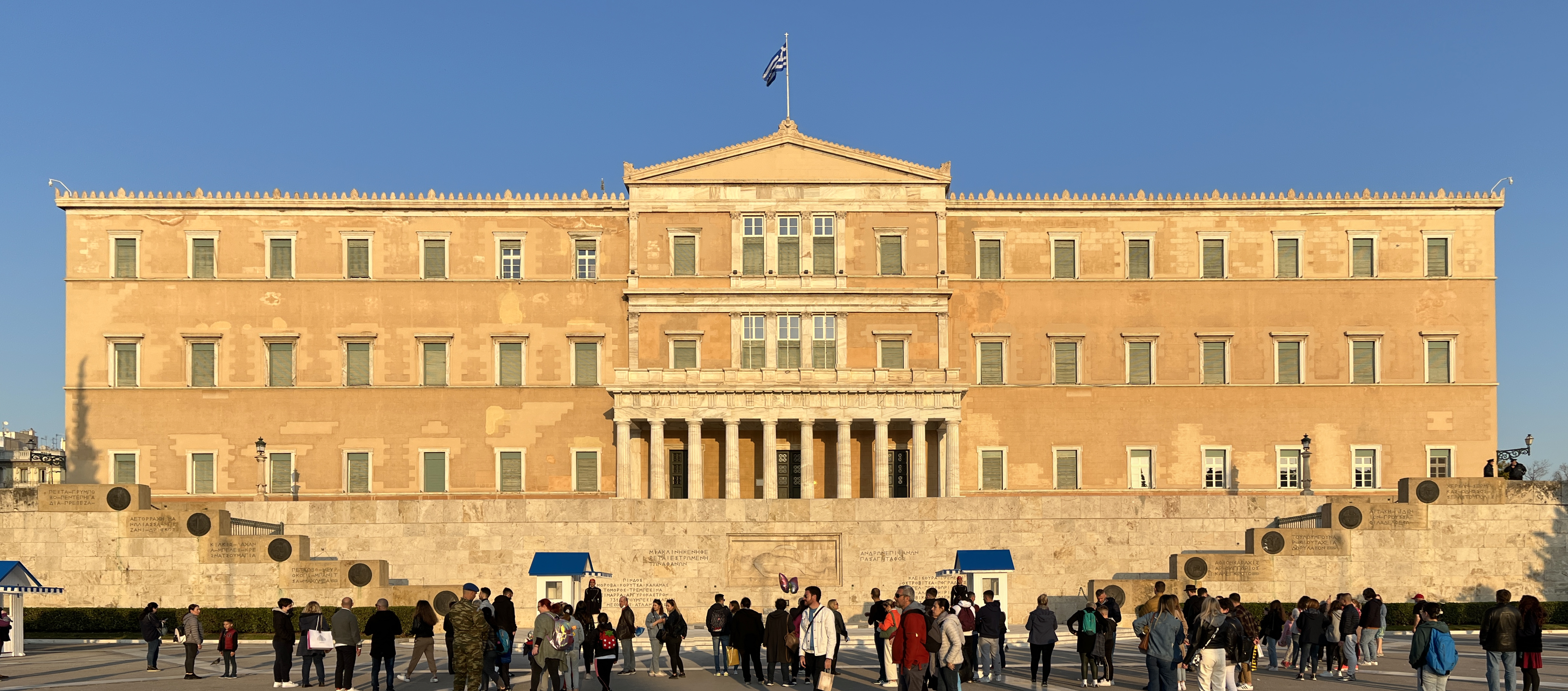

Hellenic Parliament
- Territorial extent: Greece
- Passed by: Hellenic Parliament
- Passed: 18 May 2017

Legislative history
- Passed: 18 May 2017
- Voting summary: 153 voted for; 128 voted against
- Status: In force

The fourteenth package, the Medium-term Fiscal Strategy Framework 2018–2021, was approved on 18 May. It amended provisions of the thirteenth package. The extra measures were to support a debt deal. The measures were approved by the Syriza-ANEL coalition with 153 votes.

=== The measures ===
The measures include:

- Further pension cuts
- Income tax exception lowered from €8,600 down to about €5,700.
- Privatization of Greece's PPC electricity utility, railways, Athens' international airport and the Port of Thessaloniki

== See also ==
- 2010–2014 Portuguese financial crisis
- Post-2008 Irish economic downturn
- 2008–2014 Spanish financial crisis
