= MEFP =

MEFP can refer to

- Memorandum of Economic and Financial Policies, part of the 2010 Economic Adjustment Programme for Ireland
- Ministry of Education and Vocational Training of Spain
- Multiple explosively formed penetrator
