= Economic Adjustment Programme for Portugal =

Bailout plan for Portugal

The Economic Adjustment Programme for Portugal, usually referred to as the Bailout programme, is a Memorandum of understanding on financial assistance to the Portuguese Republic in order to cope with the 2010–14 Portuguese financial crisis.

The three-year programme was signed in May 2011 by the Portuguese Government under then-Prime Minister José Sócrates of the Socialist Party (PS) on one hand, and on the other hand by the European Commission on behalf of the Eurogroup, the European Central Bank (ECB) and the International Monetary Fund (IMF).

In June 2014, under the leadership of then-Prime Minister Pedro Passos Coelho of the Social Democratic Party (PSD), Portugal exited the €78 billion programme, with a concluding tranche of €0.4 billion being disbursed in November 2014.

== Background ==
On 6 April 2011, the resigning Prime Minister José Sócrates of the Socialist Party (PS) announced on television that the country, facing a status of bankruptcy, would request financial assistance to the IMF (at the time managed by Dominique Strauss-Kahn) and the European Financial Stability Facility, like Greece and Ireland had done before.

A set of reputed economists (including former Prime Minister and eventual President Aníbal Cavaco Silva) pointed out to a rigid labor market, overstaffing in the public sector and the excessive size of the Portuguese government whose total expenditures overtook 45% of the GDP in 2005.

On the other hand, Robert Fishman, in The New York Times article "Portugal's Unnecessary Bailout", points out that Portugal fell victim to successive waves of speculation by pressure from bond traders, rating agencies and speculators. In the first quarter of 2010, before pressure from the markets, Portugal had one of the best rates of economic recovery in the EU. From the perspective of Portugal's industrial orders, exports, entrepreneurial innovation and high-school achievement, the country matched or even surpassed its neighbors in Western Europe. Productivity and purchasing power remained, however, among the lowest in the European Union.

The causes for the low level of labor productivity in Portugal by 2011 have been attributed to a rigid labor market, a labor movement-inspired legal framework, an overstaffed public sector including the Portuguese civil service, and a low rate of high school (secondary education) graduates, which when put together led to great misallocation of factors of production.

== Memorandum of Understanding ==
On 16 May 2011, the eurozone leaders officially approved a €78 billion bailout package for Portugal, which became the third eurozone country, after Ireland and Greece, to receive emergency funds. The bailout loan was equally split between the European Financial Stabilisation Mechanism, the European Financial Stability Facility, and the International Monetary Fund. According to the Portuguese finance minister, the average interest rate on the bailout loan is expected to be 5.1 percent. As part of the deal, the country agreed to cut its budget deficit from 9.8 percent of GDP in 2010 to 5.9 percent in 2011, 4.5 percent in 2012 and 3 percent in 2013.

In June 2011, Portugal officially requested the €78 billion IMF-EU bailout package in a bid to stabilise its public finances.

To avoid the legislative ratification procedures required for treaties under the international law, the programme was set up as an intergovernmental agreement consisting of:

- the Memorandum of Economic and Financial Policies (MEFP),
- the Memorandum of Understanding on Specific Economic Policy Conditionality (MoU),
- and the Technical Memorandum of Understanding (TMU), the actual Loan Facility Agreement.

The agreements were signed in June 2011 by the Portuguese government and the European Commission. Portugal and the IMF already had a long history before the 2011 bailout with the past IMF rescue packages to the Portuguese Republic in 1977 and 1983.

== Further events ==
In order to accomplish the European Union/IMF-led rescue plan for Portugal's sovereign debt crisis, in July and August 2011 the new government led by Pedro Passos Coelho announced it was going to cut on state spending and increase austerity measures, including public servant wage cuts and additional tax increases.

On 6 July 2011, the ratings agency Moody's had cut Portugal's credit rating to junk status, Moody's also launched speculation that Portugal could follow Greece in requesting a second bailout.

After the bailout was announced, the Portuguese government headed by Pedro Passos Coelho managed to implement measures to improve the State's financial situation, including tax hikes, a freeze of civil service-related lower-wages and cuts of higher-wages by 14.3%, on top of the government's spending cuts. The Portuguese government also agreed to eliminate its golden share in Portugal Telecom which gave it veto power over vital decisions. In 2012, all public servants had already seen an average wage cut of 20% relative to their 2010 baseline, with cuts reaching 25% for those earning more than 1,500 euro per month. This led to a flood of specialized technicians and top officials leaving the public service, many looking for better positions in the private sector or in other European countries.

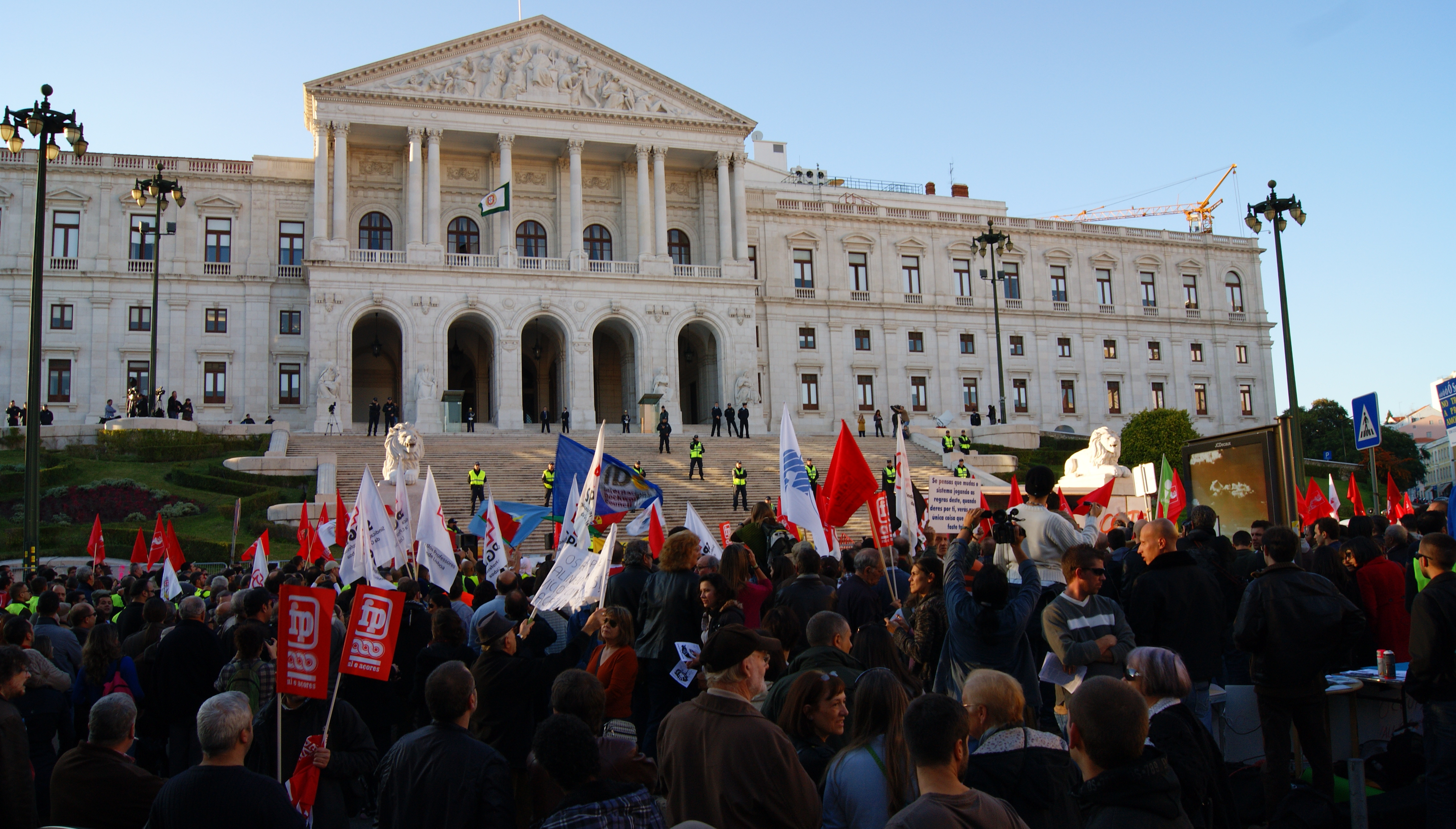
November 2011 protests against austerity measures of the Economic Adjustment Programme for Portugal outside the Assembly of the Republic

In December 2011, it was reported that Portugal's estimated budget deficit of 4.5 percent in 2011 would be substantially lower than expected, due to a one-off transfer of pension funds. The country would therefore meet its 2012 target a year earlier than expected. Despite the fact that the economy is expected to contract by 3 percent in 2011 the IMF expects the country to be able to return to medium and long-term debt sovereign markets by late 2013. Any deficit means increasing the nation's debt. To bring down the debt to sustainable levels will require a 10% budget surplus for several years according to some estimates.

In the following months the country started to be seen as moving on the right track. However, the unemployment level rose to over 15 percent in the second quarter 2012 and it was expected to rise even further in the near future.

On 7 June 2012, Portugal's largest listed bank by assets, Millennium BCP, was rescued by the Portuguese Government headed by Passos Coelho, through 3 billion euros ($3.8 billion) in state funds it took from the country's bailout package.

In January 2013, the European Commission approved, under EU state aid rules, a rescuing recapitalisation totalling €1.1 billion granted by Portugal to Banco Internacional do Funchal S.A. (Banif) for reasons of financial stability. The Portuguese Republic committed to provide a far-reaching restructuring plan for Banif by 31 March 2013.

On 3 August 2014, Banco Espírito Santo, at the time the largest listed bank in Portugal, was rescued by the State. The bank was subject to a resolution measure and split in two: Novo Banco, which kept its healthy operations ("good bank"), while the toxic assets remained in the existing bank ("bad bank") which entered into liquidation in 13 July 2016. Novo Banco received a €4.9 billion bailout to be recapitalized, funded by the Portuguese Resolution Fund, to which the Portuguese government lent €3.9 billion.

== See also ==
- 2010–2014 Portuguese financial crisis
- Economic Adjustment Programme for Cyprus
- First Economic Adjustment Programme for Greece
- Second Economic Adjustment Programme for Greece
- Third Economic Adjustment Programme for Greece
- Economic Adjustment Programme for Ireland
- Financial Assistance Programme for Spain

== Literature ==
- European Commission (June 2011). The Economic Adjustment Programme for Portugal (PDF). Occasional Papers. Brussels. doi:10.2765/16343 (inactive 12 July 2025). ISBN 978-92-79-19332-3.
