= Economic Adjustment Programme for Cyprus =

The Economic Adjustment Programme for Cyprus, usually referred to as the Bailout programme, is a memorandum of understanding on financial assistance to the Republic of Cyprus in order to cope with the 2012–13 Cypriot financial crisis.

It was signed in March 2013 by the Cypriot Government on one hand, and on the other hand by the European Commission on behalf of the Eurogroup, the European Central Bank (ECB) and the International Monetary Fund (IMF).

== Background ==
=== Credit rating downgrade to speculative ===
On 13 March 2012, Moody's slashed Cyprus's credit rating to speculative status, warning that the Cyprus government would have to inject more fresh capital into its banks to cover losses incurred through Greece's debt swap. On 25 June 2012, the day when Fitch downgraded bonds issued by Cyprus to BB+, which disqualified them from being accepted as collateral by the European Central Bank, the Cypriot government requested a bailout from the European Financial Stability Facility or the European Stability Mechanism.

=== Request for EU intervention and agreement ===
The Cypriot Government was reported requesting a bailout from the European Financial Stability Facility or the European Stability Mechanism on 25 June 2012, citing difficulties in supporting its banking sector from the exposure to the Greek debt. Representatives of the Troika (the European Commission, the International Monetary Fund, and the European Central Bank) arrived on the island in July to investigate the country's financial problems, and submitted the terms of the bailout to the Cypriot government on 25 July. The Cypriot government expressed disagreement over the terms, and continued negotiation with Troika representatives concerning possible alterations to them throughout the following months.

On 20 November, the government handed its counter-proposals to the Troika on the terms of the bailout, with negotiations continuing. On 30 November it was reported that Troika and the Cypriot Government had agreed on the bailout terms with only the amount of money required for the bailout remaining to be agreed upon. By contrast, the IMF referred only to "good progress towards an agreement". The preliminary agreement terms were made public on 30 November. The austerity measures included cuts in civil service salaries, social benefits, allowances and pensions and increases in VAT, tobacco, alcohol and fuel taxes, taxes on lottery winnings, property, and higher public health care charges.

== Memorandum of understanding ==
On 16 March 2013, the Eurogroup, European Commission (EC), European Central Bank (ECB) and International Monetary Fund (IMF) agreed on a €10 billion deal with Cyprus, making it the fifth country—after Greece, Ireland, Portugal and Spain—to receive money from the EU-IMF. As part of the deal, a one-off bank deposit levy of 6.7% for deposits up to €100,000 and 9.9% for higher deposits, was announced on all domestic bank accounts. Savers were due to be compensated with shares in their banks. Measures were put in place to prevent withdrawal or transfer of moneys representing the prescribed levy.

The deal required the approval of the Cypriot parliament, which was due to debate it on 18 March. According to President Nicos Anastasiades, failure to ratify the measures would lead to a "disorderly bankruptcy" of the country. The Russian government "blasted Cyprus's bank levy, piling more pressure on the country's capital, Nicosia" ahead of the parliament's vote on the bailout. Russia had not decided at the time whether to extend its existing loan to Cyprus. With the background of large demonstrations outside the House of Representatives in Nicosia by Cypriot people protesting the bank deposit levy, the deal was rejected by the Cypriot parliament on 19 March 2013 with 36 votes against, 19 abstentions and one not present for the vote.

On 22 March, the Cyprus legislature approved a plan to restructure the Cyprus Popular Bank (also known as Laiki Bank), its second largest bank, creating in the process a so-called "bad bank". On 25 March, Cyprus President Anastasiades, Eurozone finance ministers, and IMF officials announced a new plan to preserve all insured deposits of 100,000 Euros or less without a levy, but shut down Laiki Bank, levying all uninsured deposits there, and levying 47.5% of uninsured deposits in Bank of Cyprus, held mostly by wealthy Russians and Russian multinational corporations who use Cyprus as an offshore bank and safe tax haven. The revised agreement, expected to raise 4.2 billion Euros in return for a €10 billion bailout, does not require any further approval of the Cypriot parliament, as the legal framework for the implied solutions for Laiki Bank and Bank of Cyprus has already been accounted for in the bill passed by the parliament last week.

When the final agreement was settled on 25 March, the idea of imposing any sort of deposit levy was dropped, as it was instead now possible to reach a mutual agreement with the Cypriot authorities accepting a direct closure of the most troubled Laiki Bank. Remaining good assets and deposits below €100,000 with Laiki Bank would be saved and transferred to Bank of Cyprus (BoC), while shareholder capital would be written off, and the uninsured deposits above €100,000 – along with other creditor claims – would be lost to the degree being decided by how much the receivership subsequently can recover from liquidation of the remaining bad assets. As an extra safety measure, uninsured deposits above €100,000 in BoC will also remain frozen until a recapitalisation has been implemented (with a possible imposed haircut if this is later deemed needed to reach the requirement for a 9% tier 1 capital ratio). The targeted closure of Laiki and recapitalisation plan for BoC helped significantly to reduce the needed loan amount for the overall bailout package, so that €10bn was still sufficient without need for imposing a general levy on bank deposits. The final conditions for activation of the bailout package were outlined by the Troika's MoU agreement, which was endorsed in full by the Cypriot House of Representatives on 30 April 2013, and included:

1. Recapitalisation of the entire financial sector while accepting a closure of the Laiki bank,
2. Implementation of the anti–money laundering framework in Cypriot financial institutions,
3. Fiscal consolidation to help bring down the Cypriot governmental budget deficit,
4. Structural reforms to restore competitiveness and macroeconomic imbalances,
5. Privatization programme.

The Cypriot debt-to-GDP ratio is on this background now forecasted only to peak at 126% in 2015 and subsequently decline to 105% in 2020, and thus considered to remain within sustainable territory. The €10bn bailout comprise €4.1bn spend on debt liabilities (refinancing and amortization), 3.4bn to cover fiscal deficits, and €2.5bn for the bank recapitalization. These amounts will be paid to Cyprus through regular tranches from 13 May 2013 until 31 March 2016. According to the programme this will be sufficient, as Cyprus during the programme period in addition will:

1. Receive €1.0bn extraordinary revenue from privatization of government assets.
2. Ensure an automatic roll-over of €1.0bn maturing Treasury Bills and €1.0bn of maturing bonds held by domestic creditors.
3. Bring down the funding need for bank recapitalization with €8.7bn, of which 0.4bn is a reinjection of future profits earned by the Central Bank of Cyprus (injected in advance in the short term, by obtaining state land as consideration), and €8.3bn originating from the bail-in of creditors in Laiki Bank and Bank of Cyprus.

Given the proposed and actual element of taking deposits as part of the agreement, it was sometimes referred to as a "bail-in" rather than a bailout.

== Exit of the bailout support programme ==
Although the bailout support programme feature sufficient financial transfers until March 2016, Cyprus began slowly to regain its access to the private lending markets already in June 2014. At this point of time, the government sold €0.75bn of bonds with a five-year maturity, to the tune of a 4.85% yield. A continued selling of bonds with a ten-year maturity, which would equal a regain of complete access to the private lending market (and mark the end of the era with need for bailout support), is expected to happen sometime in 2015. The Cypriot minister of finance recently confirmed, that the government plan to issue two new European Medium Term Note (EMTN) bonds in 2015, likely shortly ahead of the expiry of another €1.1bn bond on 1 July and a second expiry of a €0.9bn bond on 1 November. As announced in advance, the Cypriot government issued by the end of April 2015, €1bn of seven-year bonds with a 4.0% yield and maturity on 6 May 2022.

== See also ==
- 2012–13 Cypriot financial crisis
- Economic Adjustment Programme for Ireland
- First Economic Adjustment Programme for Greece
- Second Economic Adjustment Programme for Greece
- Third Economic Adjustment Programme for Greece
- Economic Adjustment Programme for Portugal
- Financial Assistance Programme for Spain

== Literature ==
- European Commission (May 2013). The Economic Adjustment Programme for Cyprus (PDF). Occasional Papers. Brussels. doi:10.2765/47807 (inactive 12 July 2025). ISBN 978-92-79-29349-8.
