= Financial Assistance Programme for Spain =

Bank bilout plan for Spain

The Financial Assistance Programme for the Recapitalisation of Financial Institutions in Spain, usually referred to as the bank bailout programme, was a memorandum of understanding on financial assistance to the banking institutions of Spain in order to cope with the 2008–2014 Spanish financial crisis. The bank bailout was officially requested by the Spanish government under Prime Minister Mariano Rajoy on 25 June 2012, with the memorandum being approved by the Eurogroup on 20 July.

The programme provided for a financial assistance of up to €100 billion (of which Spain used €41.4 billion for bank recapitalization) for a period of 18 months, but the restructuring of the banks receiving public support under the State aid rules was expected to take up to five years.

Spain exited the bank bailout programme on 23 January 2014.

== Terms ==
Under the terms of the programme as agreed by the Eurogroup, Spain was to receive the first tranche of the bailout loans before the end of July 2012. Spain was also allowed until 2014 to bring its budget deficit back within the terms of the Growth and Stability Pact, easening the EU deficit target for 2012 from 5.3 percent to 6.3 percent, to three to 4.3 percent in 2013, to reach the intended three percent target in 2014 (though in 2013 Spain would secure a new extension of two more years to comply, until 2016). In exchange, a tight fiscal policy and complete oversight of Spain's financial sector by the European troika was enforced for the bailout programme's duration, though bailout terms were considered softer than the economic programmes agreed for Greece, Ireland and Portugal. Funds were disbursed in the form of credit for the FROB, Spain's own bank rescue fund.

The programme saw the adoption in Spain of a massive austerity package worth €65 billion by the then Spanish government under Prime Minister Mariano Rajoy, including reforms in taxation (in the energy sector, hikes on VAT and environmental taxes, or the abolition of home purchase deductions), spending cuts (such as in unemployment benefits, civil servants' bonuses, or welfare dependency), a public administration overhaul (with reductions of local councillors and public companies), and privatizations (affecting rail, air and maritine transport services). It also saw the establishment of a bad bank (Sareb) to absorb the toxic assets of banks.

Rajoy's government rejected dubbing the loans a "bailout" due to the stigma attached to the term, instead preferring to use terms such as "financial support" or "a loan with very favorable terms". This semantic debate drew mockery and mistrust by national and international media.

== See also ==
- Economic Adjustment Programme for Cyprus
- Economic Adjustment Programme for Ireland
- Economic Adjustment Programme for Portugal
- First Economic Adjustment Programme for Greece
- Second Economic Adjustment Programme for Greece
- Third Economic Adjustment Programme for Greece
