= Economic Adjustment Programme for Ireland =

Economic policy in Ireland

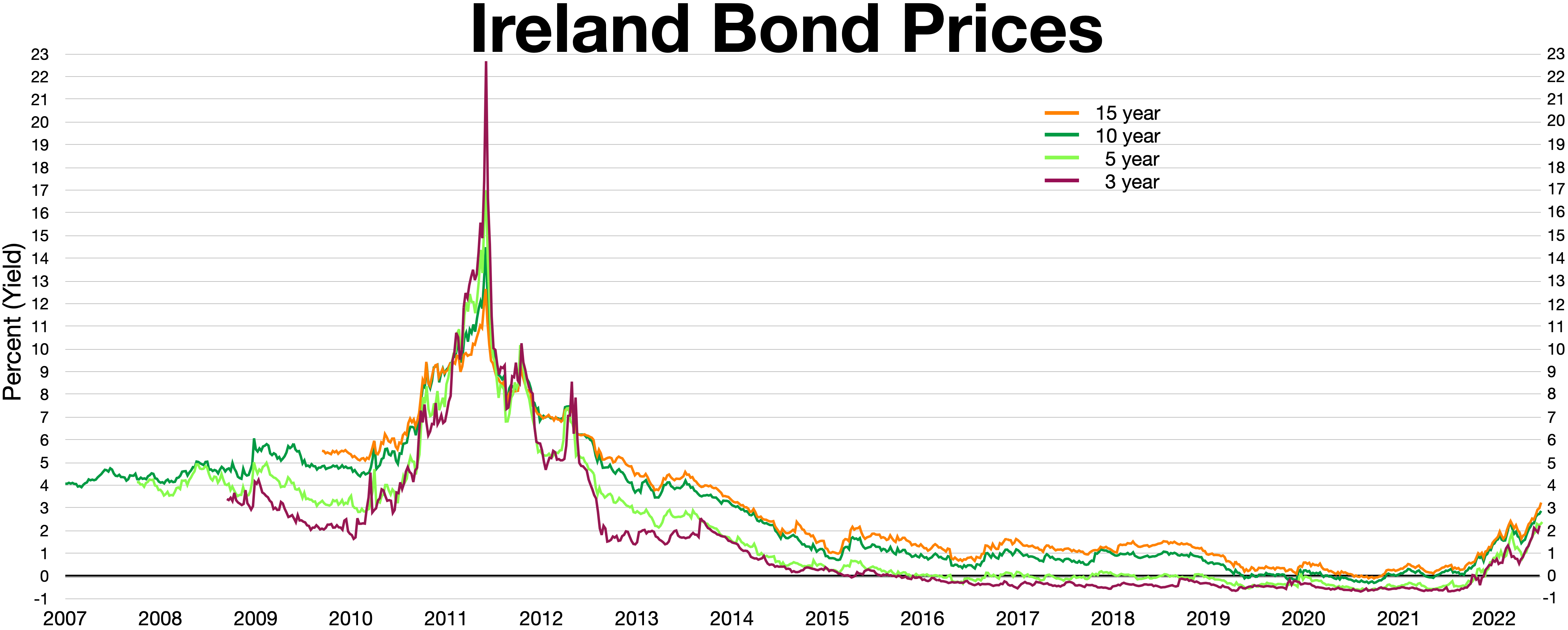
Ireland bond prices, Inverted yield curve in 2011 15 year bond 10 year bond 5 year bond 3 year bond

The Economic Adjustment Programme for Ireland, usually referred to as the Bailout programme, is a memorandum of understanding on financial assistance to Ireland in order to cope with the Post-2008 Irish financial crisis.

It was signed on 16 December 2010 by the Irish Government under then-Taoiseach Brian Cowen on one hand, and on the other hand by the European Commission on behalf of the Eurogroup, the European Central Bank (ECB) and the International Monetary Fund (IMF).

On 15 December 2013, Ireland exited the programme.

== Memorandum of understanding ==
On 28 November 2010, European Commission, European Central Bank (ECB) and the International Monetary Fund (IMF), colloquially called the European Troika, agreed with the Irish government in a three-year financial aid programme on the condition of far-reaching austerity measures to be imposed on the Irish society in order to cut government expenditure.

To avoid the legislative ratification procedures required for treaties under international law, the programme was set up as an intergovernmental agreement consisting of:

- the Memorandum of Economic and Financial Policies (MEFP),
- the Memorandum of Understanding on Specific Economic Policy Conditionality (MoU),
- and the Technical Memorandum of Understanding (TMU), the actual Loan Facility Agreement.

The agreements were signed on 16 December 2010 by the Irish government and the European Commission.

=== Financial aid ===
The total amount of €85 billion would consist of €67.5 billion external support, consisting of:

- €22.5 billion from the European Financial Stabilisation Mechanism (EFSM),
- €22.5 billion from the European Financial Stability Facility (EFSF) and bilateral loans from the Euro non-member states Denmark, Sweden and the United Kingdom, and
- €22.5 billion from the International Monetary Fund (IMF)

as well as a €17.5 billion contribution from the Irish Treasury and the National Pension Reserve Fund.

== See also ==
- Post-2008 Irish economic downturn
- Post-2008 Irish banking crisis
- Economic Adjustment Programme for Cyprus
- First Economic Adjustment Programme for Greece
- Second Economic Adjustment Programme for Greece
- Third Economic Adjustment Programme for Greece
- Economic Adjustment Programme for Portugal
- Financial Assistance Programme for Spain

== Literature ==
- European Commission (February 2011). The Economic Adjustment Programme for Ireland (PDF). Occasional Papers. Brussels. doi:10.2765/18170 (inactive 12 July 2025). ISBN 978-92-79-19326-2.
