= Portugal and the International Monetary Fund =

Portugal is located on the West coast of the Iberian Peninsula.

Portugal joined the International Monetary Fund (IMF) on March 29, 1961, submitting 100 percent of its quota, which is 2,060.10 SDR. Currently, Portugal is using 187.5 percent of its quota, which is 3,862.69 SDR. Portugal has not received an IMF disbursement since 2014. Portugal has just .44 percent of voting power in the IMF.

== Constituency ==
Portugal is part of a constituency with Albania, Greece, Italy, Malta, and San Marino. Their representative on the Executive Board of the IMF is Domenico G. Fanizza of Italy. Portugal has 22,066 votes, the third most in their constituency, behind Italy and Greece. This constituency has 4.13 percent of the total voting power within the IMF.

== Surveillance ==
As a member of the IMF, Portugal receives IMF surveillance reports which detail any red flags in the Portuguese economy, and make suggestions for its future health. Before the 2008 financial crisis, the IMF conducted several surveillance reports on Portugal that if heeded, could have lessened the effect of the crisis. Some of the issues that were highlighted were the increase in small scale economic asymmetries, lessening growth, lack of monetary consolidation, a lack of competition, ignorance of capital flow issues, and issues with private sector borrowing.

== 2008 financial crisis ==
Due to the 2008 financial crisis, Portugal's economy suffered in several areas. Portugal was plagued with low real GDP growth and borrowing costs, significant deficits, low investment, and high national debt. Additionally, the quick stop of capital flows in Portugal was made easier because of this increasing amount of debt that was being accrued. By 2009, it seemed like Portugal would start to recover, but the euro area crisis negatively affected the economy.

== Agreement ==
By 2011, the crisis was so severe that Portugal requested a three-year bailout from the IMF. The same year, Portugal received a disbursement of 11,503,000 SDR as its first of this deal. The agreement that Portugal and the IMF made focused on both monetary contraction and reforms on economic structure. The IMF reforms for Portugal included changes to labor and product markets, taxes, pensions and the public and the financial sector.

== Conditions ==
Several conditions were placed on Portugal in exchange for this bailout, including structural benchmarks and prior actions, predominantly in Portugal's fiscal sector.

== Results ==
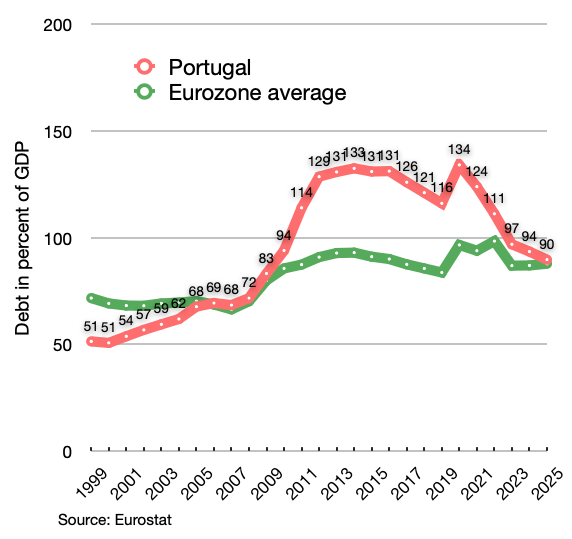
Portuguese national debt skyrocketed during the 2010–2014 Portuguese financial crisis, but is slowly trending down.

Results of the IMF program were mixed. On one hand, Portugal recovered its access to capital markets, which was a main goal of the program and the largest contributor to the crisis. On the other hand, the Portuguese government still has significant debt and unstable foreign liabilities.

== Current Economic Status ==
Portugal also receives Article IV reports from the IMF. In the most recent report, published in September 2018, the IMF gives a detailed report on the current Portuguese economy. This report notes that although investments and exports have spurred growth and low inflation throughout 2017, there is persisting unemployment in Portugal. Structural balance is also said to be improving as deficits and debt are steadily decreasing. Banks are improving as well, though credit is growing much more slowly and is holding back further improvement. Overall, the economy is steady, but Portugal is still susceptible to downturns and needs more tenable growth.
