= Third Economic Adjustment Programme for Greece =

2015 economic bailout package

The Third Economic Adjustment Programme for Greece, usually referred to as the third bailout package or the third memorandum, is a memorandum of understanding on financial assistance to the Hellenic Republic in order to cope with the Greek government-debt crisis.

It was signed on 12 July 2015 by the Greek Government under prime minister Alexis Tsipras and it expired on 20 August 2018.

== History ==
=== 2012 ===
A Financial Times editorial on 22 February 2012 argued leaders had "proved themselves unable to settle on a solution that will not need to be revisited yet again", that at best the deal could only hope to remedy one part of the Greek disaster, namely the country's debilitated public finances, though it would not likely even do that. The Eurozone's latest plan did, at least, evince consistency with the currency block's previous behaviour:

from the start, its approach has been a halfway house of resisting a sovereign default but not doing enough to remove the risk altogether. The reason is obvious: core governments find it politically impossible to put up more money. So it is unfathomable that they did not demand more from private creditors. The debt restructuring leaves Greece and its helpers with €100bn of debt that could have been written down entirely and left funds to address future "accidents" without resorting to a third rescue. If there is another showdown with Greece it will have been caused by this.

Household and corporate bank deposits (including repos) in Greece over time.

German minister of finance Wolfgang Schäuble and Eurogroup president Jean-Claude Juncker shared the scepticism and did not rule out a third bailout. According to a leaked official report from the European Commission, the ECB and the IMF, Greece may need another €50 billion ($66bn) from 2015 to 2020.

In mid-May 2012 the crisis and impossibility to form a new coalition government after elections led to strong speculation Greece would have to leave the Eurozone. The potential exit became known as "Grexit" and started to affect international market behaviour, as well as causing an accelerated decrease of bank deposits in Greek banks (commonly referred to as a bank-run).

In Greece, after all attempts to form a government failed following the parliamentary election in May 2012, a new second election in mid-June had to be announced. The new election led to the formation of a government of national salvation of conservative New Democracy with the social democrat PASOK and democratic socialist DIMAR, supporting continued adherence to the main principles outlined by the signed bailout plan. The new government however immediately asked its creditors to be granted two extra years, extending the deadline from 2015 to 2017 before being required to be self-financed, with minor budget deficits fully covered by extraordinary income from the privatisation program.

=== 2013–2014 ===
In August 2013, Schäuble expressed his expectations that "there will have to be another (bailout) program in Greece", a remark drawing heavy criticisms by other members of the German governing coalition. However, soon thereafter the head of the European Stability Mechanism (ESM), Klaus Regling added to Schäuble's remarks, telling the German business daily Handelsblatt that Greece might need a third bailout package as soon as in 2014.

In February 2014, the Troika was reported again to consider offering Greece a third bailout at €15–17bn, but now in conjunction with an additional debt relief for old Troika held debt, through expanding the maturity of the EFSF bonds from 30 to 50 years and lowering the interest rate 0.5% for the initial €80bn debt pile being owed to all other EU member states through the Greek Loan Facility. A decision about this potential third bailout loan, however awaits finalization of the third review of the second bailout programme, and will be conditional Greece comply with all terms specified in that programme - which include final fiscal data should verify that a primary surplus indeed was achieved in 2013. The potential third bailout loan was expected to be finally considered by European Union policy makers in May or June 2014.

=== 2015–2018 ===
Investigative reporting of the negotiations detail the gap between the Greek government and its lenders. Reaching an agreement was made more difficult by Greek government attempts to use the European refugee crisis as a bargaining chip in its migration diplomacy. After several months of negotiation, on 12 July 2015, the Greek Prime Minister, Alexis Tsipras came to a bailout agreement with lenders for a new ESM program. Greece will get a loan of up to €86 billion, which shall be handed to Greece gradually from 2015 until June 2018. This includes a buffer of up to €25 billion for the banking sector in order to address potential bank recapitalisation and resolution costs. In return, Greece will have to streamline the VAT system and broaden the tax base to increase revenue, reform the pension system, safeguard the full legal independence of ELSTAT, automatically cut public spending to get primary surpluses, reform justice with a view to accelerate the judicial process and reduce costs, implement all OECD toolkit I recommendations, modernise labour market legislation, modernise and strengthen the Greek administration, revoke the laws passed by the Tsipras government counter to the February 20 agreement—except for the one concerning the "humanitarian crisis"— or identify clear compensatory equivalents for the vested rights that were subsequently created (e.g. for the rehiring of fired public servants), recapitalize the banks, and privatize 50 billion of state assets. To help support growth and job creation in Greece up to 2020, the European Commission will help mobilise up to €35 billion to fund investment and economic activity, including in SMEs. The Investment Plan for Europe will also provide funding opportunities for Greece.

On 14 August, after a rancorous all-night debate, the Hellenic Parliament backed the country's new bailout deal, although more than 40 MPs from Syriza voted against the deal and Tsipras had to rely on the support of the opposition: New Democracy, To Potami and PASOK. Following the Parliament's decision, the Eurogroup welcomed the agreement between Greece and its lenders, and initiated the launching of the national procedures required for the approval of the new ESM program. These national procedured were concluded by 19 August, and Greece received the first disbursement of the initial tranche of up to €26bn. A first sub-tranche of €10bn will was made available immediately, but in a segregated account at the ESM, destined for bank recapitalisation and resolution purposes.

== See also ==
- Greek government-debt crisis
- Greek government-debt crisis countermeasures
- Economic Adjustment Programme for Cyprus
- First Economic Adjustment Programme for Greece
- Second Economic Adjustment Programme for Greece
- Economic Adjustment Programme for Ireland
- Economic Adjustment Programme for Portugal
- Financial Assistance Programme for Spain
