= First Economic Adjustment Programme for Greece =

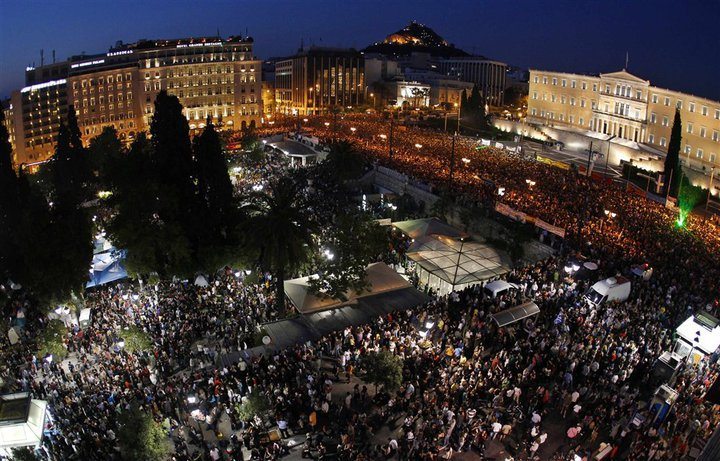
100,000 people protest against the austerity measures in front of parliament building in Athens (29 May 2011).

The First Economic Adjustment Programme for Greece, initially called the Economic Adjustment Programme for Greece and usually referred to as the first bailout package or the first memorandum, is a memorandum of understanding on financial assistance to the Hellenic Republic in order to cope with the Greek government-debt crisis.

It was signed on 3 May 2010 by the Greek Government under then-prime minister George Papandreou on one hand, and on the other hand by the European Commission on behalf of the Eurogroup, the European Central Bank (ECB) and the International Monetary Fund (IMF).

Of the totaling €107.3 billion of financial assistance, €72.8 billion were disbursed by 1 March 2012, when the programme was superseded by the Second Economic Adjustment Programme for Greece comprising the undisbursed amounts of the first programme and additional €130 billion for the years 2012–14.

== Background ==
Having had the credit rating agencies further downgrade their assessment of Greece's ability to honour its debts, the risk premiums on long-term Greek government bonds reached record (and unsustainable) levels. On 23 April 2010 the Greek government requested official financial assistance from the rest of the European Union and the IMF.

== Memorandum of Understanding ==
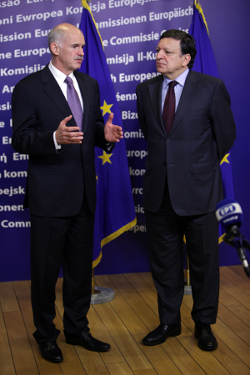
Former Prime Minister George Papandreou and former European Commission President José Manuel Barroso after their meeting in Brussels on 20 June 2011.

=== Financial aid ===
On 1–2 May 2010, European Commission, European Central Bank (ECB) and the International Monetary Fund (IMF), colloquially called the European troika, agreed with the Greek government in a three-year financial aid programme that was outlined in a Memorandum of Understanding.

The total amount of €110 billion would consist of €80 billion bilateral loan commitments provided by the Eurogroup and pooled by the European Commission in the Greek Loan Facility (GLF), and additional €30 billion to be provided under a Stand-By Arrangement (SBA) by the IMF, which was headed at the time by Dominique Strauss-Kahn.

Instrumental in determining the rates of the individual euro area countries in the €80bn of the Eurozone was the respective equity interest in the capital of the ECB, which in turn is determined every five years after the prorated share of a country in the total population and economic output in the EU. The German share of the €80bn was 28%, or about €22.4bn in three years while France paid €16.8bn.

The amount of €80 billion to be provided by the Eurogroup was later reduced by €2.7bn, as Slovakia decided not to participate in the Greek Loan Facility Agreement and as Ireland and Portugal had to step down from the facility themselves requesting financial assistance.

=== Commitments of the Greek government ===
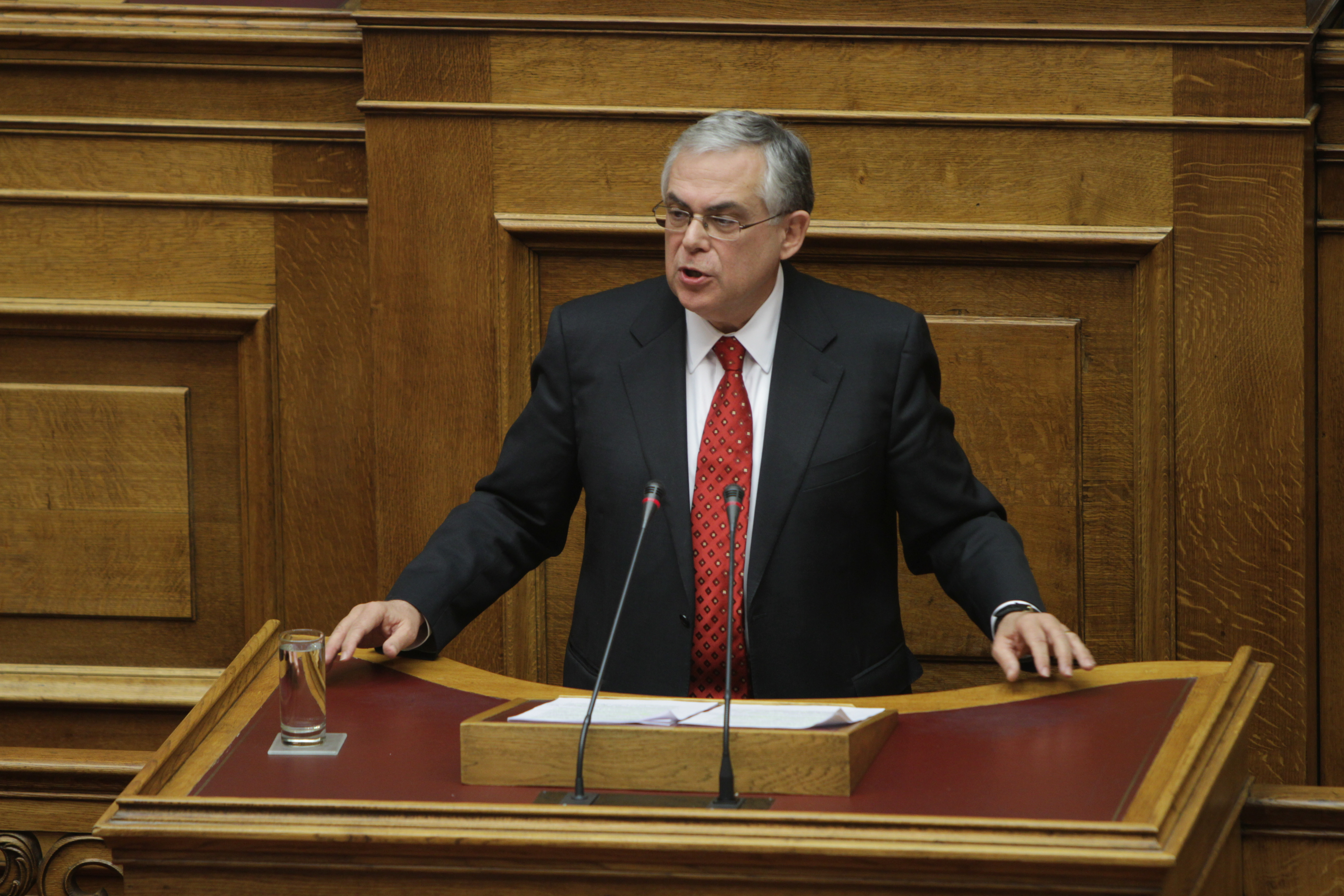
Interim prime minister Lucas Papademos defends the austerity measures in parliament (November 2011).

The Greek debt in exchange for household should be consolidated within three years, so that the budget deficit should be reduced by 2014 to below 3 percent. The minutes of the IMF Executive Board were revealed nearly four years later, and highlight amongst other items, the fear that Greek social cohesion could be at risk. The Greek private sector, it was learned in 2014, was amenable to the deal because it curtailed the practice of paying civil servants a 13th and a 14th "month" each year. This curtailment was impossible for the Greek government to achieve on its own because of the political pressure inherent to the system.

== Disbursement ==
In May 2010 Greece received the first tranche of the bailout loans totaling €20bn. Of this total, 5.5 billion came from the IMF and 14.5 billion of Euro states.

On 13 September the second tranche of €6.5bn was disbursed. The 3rd tranche of the same amount was paid on 19 January 2011. On 16 March, 4th tranche in the amount of €10.9 billion was paid out, followed by the 5th installment on 2 July. The 6th tranche of €8bn was paid out after months of delay in early December. Of this amount, the IMF provided €2.2bn.

== See also ==
- Greek government-debt crisis
- Greek government-debt crisis countermeasures
- Economic Adjustment Programme for Cyprus
- Second Economic Adjustment Programme for Greece
- Third Economic Adjustment Programme for Greece
- Economic Adjustment Programme for Ireland
- Economic Adjustment Programme for Portugal
- Financial Assistance Programme for Spain

== Literature ==
- European Commission (May 2010). The Economic Adjustment Programme for Greece (PDF). Occasional Papers. Brussels. doi:10.2765/46750. ISBN 978-92-79-15074-6.
