= Second Economic Adjustment Programme for Greece =

Bailout package for Greece, signed in 2012

The Second Economic Adjustment Programme for Greece, usually referred to as the second bailout package or the second memorandum, is a memorandum of understanding on financial assistance to the Hellenic Republic in order to cope with the Greek government-debt crisis.

It was signed on 1 March 2012 by the Greek Government under then-prime minister Lucas Papademos on one hand, and on the other hand by the European Commission on behalf of the Eurogroup, the European Central Bank (ECB) and the International Monetary Fund (IMF).

The second bailout package expired on 30 June 2015. It was superseded by the Third Economic Adjustment Programme for Greece.

== History ==
=== Early draft (July 2011) ===
On 21 July 2011, 17 leaders of Euro countries, meeting at an EU summit, approved a preliminary draft of a second bailout package for Greece to address the limitations of the First Greek bailout package. The second bailout package would take the form of an €110bn aid package provided by the newly created European Financial Stability Facility. The repayment period was extended from seven to 15 years and the interest rate was lowered to 3.5%.

For the first time, this also included a Private Sector Involvement (called a PSI), meaning that the private financial sector accepted a "voluntary" haircut (finance). It was agreed that the net contribution of banks and insurance companies to support Greece would include an additional €37bn in 2014. The planned purchase of Greek bonds from private creditors by the euro rescue fund at their face value will burden the private sector with at least another €12.6bn.

It was also announced at the EU summit, a reconstruction plan for Greece in order to promote economic growth. The European Commission established a "Task Force for Greece".

EU summit (26 October 2011)

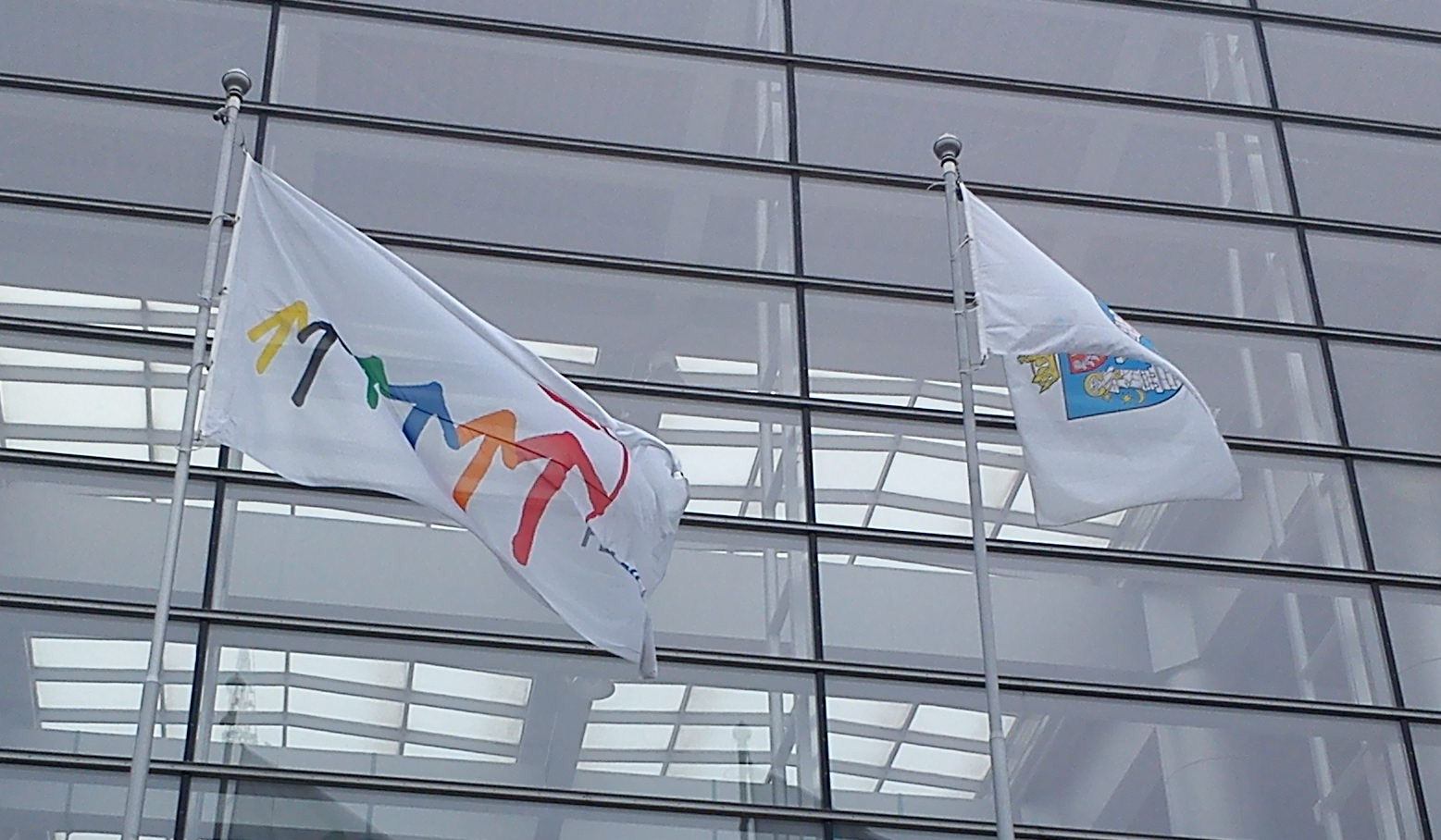
Polish presidency of the Council of the European Union, 2011

On the night of 26 to 27 October at the EU summit, the politicians made two important decisions to reduce the risk of a possible contagion to other institutions, notably Cyprus, in the case of a Greek default. The first decision was to require all European banks to achieve 9% capitalization, to make them strong enough to withstand those financial losses that potentially could erupt from a Greek default. The second decision was to leverage the EFSF from €500bn to €1 trillion, as a firewall to protect financial stability in other Eurozone countries with a looming debt crisis. The leverage had previously been criticized from many sides, because it is something taxpayers ultimately risk to pay for, because of the significantly increased risks assumed by the EFSF.

Furthermore, the Euro countries agreed on a plan to cut the debt of Greece from today's 160% to 120% of GDP by 2020. As part of that plan, it was proposed that all owners of Greek governmental bonds should "voluntarily" accept a 50% haircut of their bonds (resulting in a debt reduction worth €100bn), and moreover accept interest rates being reduced to only 3.5%. At the time of the summit, this was at first formally accepted by the government banks in Europe. The task to negotiate a final deal, also including the private creditors, was handed over to the Greek politicians.

In view of the uncertainty of the domestic political development in Greece, the first disbursement was suspended after Prime Minister George Papandreou announced on 1 November 2011 that he wanted to hold a referendum on the decisions of the Euro summit. After two days of intense pressure, particularly from Germany and France, he finally gave up on the idea. On 11 November 2011 he was succeeded as prime minister by Loukas Papademos, who was to lead a new transitional government. The most important task of this interim government was to finalize the "haircut deal" for Greek governmental bonds and pass a new austerity package, to comply with the Troika requirements for receiving the second bailout loan worth €130bn (enhanced from the previously offered amount at €109bn).

One of the German EFSF-leverage critics, Fabian Lindner, then likened the austerity pressure Greece was feeling to the attitude the US exercised over Germany in 1931. In that earlier circumstance, the collapse of an Austrian and then a German bank followed, leading to a worsening of the Great Depression, political change and ultimately war.

=== Final agreement (February 2012) ===
The Troika behind the second bailout package defined three requirements for Greece to comply with in order to receive the money. The first requirement was to finalize an agreement whereby all private holders of governmental bonds would accept a 50% haircut with yields reduced to 3.5%, thus facilitating a €100bn debt reduction for Greece. The second requirement was that Greece needed to implement another demanding austerity package in order to bring its budget deficit into sustainable territory. The third and final requirement was that a majority of the Greek politicians should sign an agreement guaranteeing their continued support for the new austerity package, even after the elections in April 2012.

On 21 February 2012, the Eurogroup finalized the second bailout package. In a thirteen-hour marathon meeting in Brussels, EU Member States agreed to a new €100 billion loan and a retroactive lowering of the bailout interest rates to a level of just 150 basis points above the Euribor. The IMF was to provide "a significant contribution" to that loan but was only to decide in the second week of March how much that will be. EU Member States would also pass on to Greece all profits which their central banks made by buying Greek bonds at a debased rate until 2020. Private investors accepted a slightly bigger haircut of 53.5% of the face value of Greek governmental bonds, the equivalent to an overall loss of around 75%. The deal implied that previous Greek bond holders are being given, for €1000 of previous notional, €150 in "PSI payment notes" issued by the EFSF and €315 in "New Greek Bonds" issued by the Hellenic Republic, including a "GDP-linked security". The latter represents a marginal coupon enhancement in case the Greek growth meets certain conditions. While the market price of the portfolio proposed in the exchange is of the order of 21% of the original face value (15% for the two EFSF PSI notes – 1 and 2 years – and 6% for the New Greek Bonds – 11 to 30 years), the duration of the set of New Greek Bonds is slightly below 10 years.

On 9 March 2012 the International Swaps and Derivatives Association (ISDA) issued a communiqué calling the debt restructuring deal with its private sector involvement (PSI) a "Restructuring Credit Event" which will trigger payment of credit default swaps. According to Forbes magazine Greece's restructuring represents a default. It is the world's biggest debt restructuring deal, affecting some €206bn of bonds. The creditors are invited to swap their current Greek bonds into new bonds with a maturity of between 11 and 30 years and lower average yields of 3.65% (2% for the first three years, 3% for the next five years, and 4.2% thereafter), thus facilitating a €100bn debt reduction for Greece. Euro-area Member States have pledged to contribute €30bn for private sector participation. In case not enough bondholders agree to a voluntary bond swap, the Greek government threatened to and did introduce a retroactive collective action clause to enforce participation.

The cash will be handed over after it is clear that private-sector bondholders do indeed join in the haircut, and after Greece gives evidence of the legal framework that it will put in place to implement dozens of "prior actions" - from sacking underproductive tax collectors to passing legislation to liberalise the country's closed professions, tightening rules against bribery and readying at least two large state-controlled companies for sale by June. In return for the bailout money Greece accepts "an enhanced and permanent presence on the ground" of European monitors. It will also have to service its debts from a special, separate escrow account, depositing sums in advance to meet payments that fall due in the following three months. This operation will be supervised by the Troika.

On 3 March 2012, The Institute of International Finance said twelve of its steering committee would swap their bonds and accept a loss of up to 75%. When all acceptances had been counted at March 9, and after the Greek parliament subsequently had decided to activate a collective action clause for the bonds covered by Greek law, the overall share of Greek government bonds to face a debt swap had reached 95.7% (equal to €197bn). The remaining 4.3% of bond holders covered by foreign law and refusing the debt swap (equal to €9 billion), were given two weeks of extra time to reconsider and voluntarily join the swap.

When the swap is executed, the bond holders will receive a cash payment on 15% of their original holding, and become issued with new Greek bonds worth 31.5% of their old bonds (covered by 24 new securities). Combined this will result in a 53.5% haircut of the face value, so that the Greek debt pile overall will decrease from its current level at €350bn, to a more sustainable level around €250bn.

On 20 March 2012, the Master Financial Assistance Facility Agreement (MFFA) between the EFSF, the Hellenic Republic, the Hellenic Financial Stability Fund (HSFS) and the Bank of Greece was ratified by the Hellenic Parliament.

== See also ==
- Greek government-debt crisis
- Greek government-debt crisis countermeasures
- Economic Adjustment Programme for Cyprus
- First Economic Adjustment Programme for Greece
- Third Economic Adjustment Programme for Greece
- Economic Adjustment Programme for Ireland
- Economic Adjustment Programme for Portugal
- Financial Assistance Programme for Spain

== Literature ==
- European Commission (March 2012). The Second Economic Adjustment Programme for Greece (PDF). Occasional Papers. Brussels. doi:10.2765/20231 (inactive 12 July 2025). ISBN 978-92-79-22849-0.
