= List of political scandals in Greece =

This is a list of major political scandals in Greece:

Most common name	Date	Summary
Aspida scandal	1965	A political and constitutional crisis in Greece centered on the resignation, on 15 July 1965, of Prime Minister Georgios Papandreou and subsequent appointment, by King Constantine II, of successive prime ministers from Papandreou's own party, the Centre Union, to replace him.
Yugoslav corn scandal	1986–1990	A political corruption scandal in Greece between 1986 and 1990 involving 20,000 tons of corn which was imported from Yugoslavia in 1986 and falsely labeled as Greek through forged documents.
Koskotas scandal	1988–1989	A Greek corruption and financial scandal in 1988–1989 centered on George Koskotas, the owner of the Bank of Crete and mass media magnate, implicating the highest-ranking members of the Greek government, including Prime Minister Andreas Papandreou.
Siemens Greek bribery scandal	2004	A corruption and bribery scandal in Greece over deals between Siemens and Greek government officials during the 2004 Summer Olympic Games in Athens, Greece regarding security systems and purchases by OTE in the 1990s.
Greek wiretapping case 2004–05	2004–2005	The illegal tapping of more than 100 mobile phones on the Vodafone Greece network belonging mostly to members of the Greek government and top-ranking civil servants.
2008 Greek riots	2008	Nationwide riots following the police shooting of Alexandros Grigoropoulos were called "the worst Greece has seen since the restoration of democracy in 1974". While the unrest was triggered by the shooting incident, commentators described the reactions as expressing deeper causes as well, especially a widespread feeling of frustration in the younger generation about specific economic problems of the country (partly as a result of the Great Recession), a rising unemployment rate among the young generation and a perception of general inefficiency and corruption in Greek state institutions.
Lagarde list	2010	In the early summer of 2010, the French intelligence service DGSE informed the (then) head of Greece's National Intelligence Agency that many of those named in the Falciani dossier were Greek. However, it was only two years later the list became known to a wider public, when Greek journalist Kostas Vaxevanis published it in his magazine Hot Doc, protesting against the Greek government's failure to launch an investigation.
Petsas list	2020	1,232 media organisations received financial reimbursement from the Greek government for promoting the "Stay at Home" ("Μένουμε Σπίτι", Ménoume Spíti) campaign, during the first coronavirus wave in the country.
2022 Greek surveillance scandal	2022	The mobile phones of prominent political figures were hacked with the illegal software called Predator.

== See also ==
- Politics of Greece
- Crime in Greece
