= Greek government-debt crisis countermeasures =

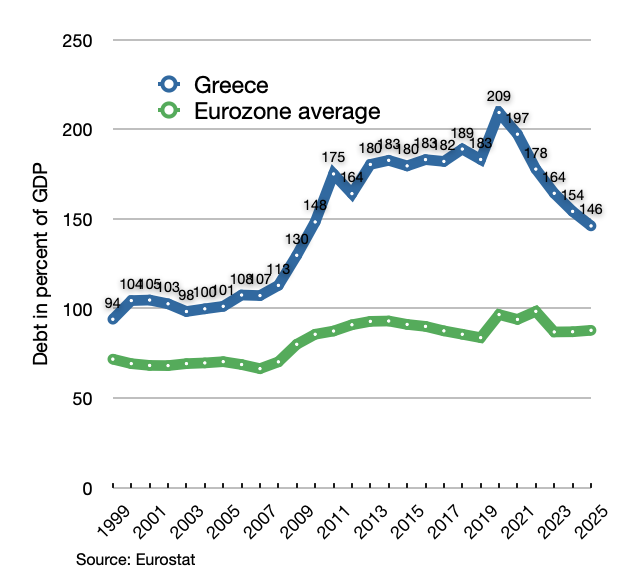
Greece's debt percentage since 1999, compared to the average of the Eurozone

The Greek government-debt crisis is one of a number of current European sovereign-debt crises. In late 2009, fears of a sovereign debt crisis developed among investors concerning Greece's ability to meet its debt obligations because of strong increase in government debt levels. This led to a crisis of confidence, indicated by a widening of bond yield spreads and the cost of risk insurance on credit default swaps compared to the other countries in the Eurozone, most importantly Germany.

== Fight against corruption and tax evasion ==
=== Methods to reduce tax evasion ===
The OECD estimated in August 2009, the size of the Greek black market to be around €65bn (equal to 25% of GDP), resulting each year in €20bn of unpaid taxes. This is a European record in relative terms, and in comparison almost twice as big as the German black market (estimated to 15% of GDP). Another study found that seven out of 10 self-employed Greeks significantly under-report their earnings, with only 200 Greeks declaring incomes of over €500,000. Undeclared income from self-employed Greeks (particularly doctors and lawyers) amounted to €28 billion in 2009, more than 10 percent of the country's gross domestic product that year. The state lost €11.2 billion in tax revenues as a result. Above all, ship owners benefit from dozens of tax exemptions. A rapid increase in government revenues through implementing a more effective tax collecting system has been recommended but several successive Greek governments had failed to improve the situation. Implementing proper reforms is estimated to be a slow process, requiring at least two legislative periods before they start to work.

In 2010 the government implemented a tax reform. In November 2011, the new Greek finance minister Evangelos Venizelos called upon all persons who owe the state more than €150,000 to pay their outstanding taxes by 24 November or find their names on a black list published on the Internet. The government later revealed the list, which also includes a number of prominent Greeks, including pop stars and sportsmen. In January 2012, Athens was considering the establishment of a 100-strong unit to go after wealthy tax evaders. The year 2012 also saw the introduction of a duty of non-cash payments for amounts over 1,500 Euros. Meanwhile, the Greek police have established a special unit, which deals exclusively with tax offenses. Germany has offered experts from its financial management and tax investigation office to help build a more efficient tax administration. However, months later it was not clear whether Greek officials would accept the offer.

By the beginning of 2011, out of 5,000 cases suspected of tax evasion gleaned from Greek bank records, only 334 have been conclusively settled. Furthermore, the Greek government has refused to look into a list of 1,991 potential tax evaders with Swiss HSBC bank accounts, it received in 2010 from former French finance minister Christine Lagarde. Initially, officials claimed at various times to have lost or misplaced the information. On 29 October 2012 the government changed its position saying it would not use stolen information to prosecute suspected offenders. Instead, Greek authorities arrested Kostas Vaxevanis, journalist and editor of the weekly magazine Hot Doc, who published the "Lagarde list". He was charged for breaching privacy laws with sentences of up to two years in prison, but he was immediately found not guilty in trial. The list includes an advisor to Greek prime minister Antonis Samaras, as well as a former minister and a member of Samaras' New Democracy political party. The list also contains the names of officials in the finance ministry. On 30 October the Greek prosecutors received a testimony from the former head of the Financial Crimes Unit (SDOE), Yiannis Kapeleris, that former finance minister Giorgos Papakonstantinou (serving the office from October 2009 until June 2011) never asked him to carry out a detailed investigation into the Lagarde list, and after he had reported the first 10 cases of irregularities to Papakonstantinou he was never instructed to continue searching for other irregular cases nor to open up detailed investigations. As the wife of a former Economic and Finance minister also appeared on the Lagarde list, a parliamentary committee also ordered this particular case to be investigated in full details on 8 November.

In 2011, the Ministry of Finance stated that Greeks with Swiss bank accounts would either be required to pay a tax or reveal information such as the identity of the bank account holder to the Greek internal revenue services. That solution still had not been effected as of 2015. That year, estimates indicated that the amount of evaded taxes stored in Swiss banks was around 80 billion euros. By then, however, a tax treaty to address this issue was under serious negotiation between the Greek and Swiss governments. An agreement was finally ratified by Switzerland on 1 March 2016 creating a new tax transparency law that would allow for a more effective battle against tax evasion. Starting in 2018, banks in both Greece and Switzerland will exchange information about the bank accounts of citizens of the other country to minimize the possibility of hiding untaxed income.

In 2016 and 2017, the government was encouraging the use of credit card or debit cards to pay for goods and services in order to reduce cash only payments. By January 2017, taxpayers were only granted tax-allowances or deductions when payments were made electronically, with a "paper trail" of the transactions that the government could easily audit. This was expected to reduce the problem of businesses taking payments but not issuing an invoice; that tactic had been used by various companies to avoid payment of VAT (sales) tax as well as income tax.

Numerous businesses were required by law to install a point of sale (POS) device to enable them to accept payment by credit or debit card by 28 July 2017. Failure to comply with the electronic payment facility can lead to fines of up to 1,500 euros. The requirement applied to around 400,000 firms or individuals in 85 professions. The greater use of cards was one of the factors that had already achieved significant increases in VAT collection in 2016.

=== Anticorruption measures ===
Transparency International, an independent corruption monitoring NGO, found that 13% of Greeks paid fakelaki (bribery in the form of envelopes with cash donations) in 2009, which was estimated to account for €787 million in yearly payments. At the same time it was estimated that roughly €1 billion was paid by companies in bribes to public institutions for avoiding bureaucratic rules or to get other benefits. When calculating all sorts of corruption in Greece, the total amount is estimated to be roughly €3.5 billion per year (equal to 1.75% of the Greek GDP). Compared with corruption levels measured by Transparency International for 160 other countries, Greece ranked at 49th in 2004, was down at 57th in 2008, and slumped to 71st in 2009.

The government elected in October 2009 had on its agenda to increase the fight against fakelaki and other forms of corruption. The Inspector General of Public Administration has started an online census of civil servants. In connection with this census he has uncovered a number criminal offences, including an entire non-existent health authority.

== Improving the economy ==
=== Business climate ===
According to the latest Doing Business Report, Greece is among the 10 economies of the world that showed the largest improvement of business climate in 2011/12. It ranks 78 in the Ease of doing business index in 2012, a big step forward compared to the previous year when it ranked 100, a bigger leap in improving its regulatory environment than in any of the previous six years. The authors of the report note that the reasons for Greece's good performance were the implementation of regulatory reforms in the following three areas: 1) It "reduced the time required to obtain a construction permit by introducing strict time limits for processing permit applications at the municipality". 2) It "strengthened investor protections by requiring greater immediate and annual disclosure of material related-party transactions", and 3) it "enhanced its insolvency process by abolishing the conciliation procedure and introducing a new rehabilitation proceeding".

== Austerity packages and reforms ==
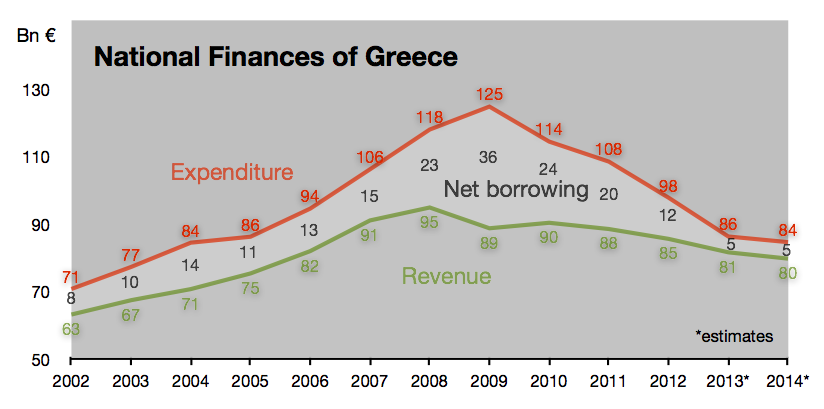
Greece public revenue vs. expenditure 2002–2012

When the first three austerity packages had been negotiated and agreed upon from February to May 2010, they featured a total fiscal tightening of €41 billion of which €28bn was related to 2010–11 and the remaining €13bn scheduled for 2012–14. Because of a worse than expected recession, this was however followed by a need for the government also to pass a fourth austerity package in June 2011 and a Fifth austerity package in 2012. The two extra packages increased the total amount of fiscal tightening for 2010–2014 to €65 billion (equal to 31.9% of the 2012 Greek GDP), with the first €36bn in 2010–11 followed by €13bn in 2012 and €16bn in 2013–14.

The Fifth austerity package only introduced a new tightening of €13.5bn for 2013–14, but this was in addition to the fiscal tightening of €2.5bn being implemented during the years as leftover from the earlier packages, resulting in €16bn of tightening for 2013–14. Creditors attributed the increased need for fiscal tightening to the Greek government's inability/unwillingness to implement the needed economic structural reforms, while the government viewed the recession as the result of the austerity measures.

=== First austerity package (February 2010) ===
The First austerity package was a minor austerity package in order to limit the deficit. This event was preceded of the First Economic Adjustment Programme for Greece memorandum. It emerged after the promise of the Greek prime minister in the World Economic Forum of Davos, Switzerland. He promised that he would take some measures so that the deficit was cut. The package was implemented on 9 February 2010 and was expected to save €0.8 billion; it included a freeze in the salaries of all government employees, a 10% cut in bonuses, as well as cuts in overtime workers, public employees and work-related travels.

=== Second austerity package (March 2010) ===
The Second austerity package included further moves to increase government income, decrease outgoings, and improve the economy. This event was preceded of the First Economic Adjustment Programme for Greece known as memorandum. The package emerged after the rapidly rise of Greek/German 10-year debt yield spread and the downgrading of Greek economy by all United States of America's nationally recognized statistical rating organizations. So, amid new fears of bankruptcy, the Greek parliament passed the "Economy Protection Bill", which was expected to save another €4.8 billion. The package was implemented on 5 March 2010 and it included 30% cuts in Christmas, Easter and leave of absence bonuses, a further 12% cut in public bonuses, a 7% cut in the salaries of public and private employees, a rise of VAT from 4.5% to 5%, from 9% to 10% and from 19% to 21%, a rise of tax on petrol to 15%, a rise in the (already existing) taxes on imported cars of up to 10%–30%, among others.

=== Third austerity package and reforms (May 2010) ===
The Third austerity package came as a result of First Economic Adjustment Programme for Greece known as memorandum that was announced by Greek prime minister on 23 April 2010 and was signed on 2 May 2010. Changes aimed at saving €38 billion through 2012, representing the biggest government overhaul in a generation.

Actions included sale of 4000 government-owned companies, limits on "13th and 14th month" salaries, a new rise of VAT from 5% to 5.5%, from 10% to 11% and from 21% to 23% and other cuts to public employee benefits, pension Reform and tax increases.

It was met with a nationwide general strike and massive protests the following day, during which three people were killed, dozens injured, and 107 arrested.

=== Fourth austerity package and reforms (June 2011) ===
The Fourth austerity package emerged from the deviation of the Greek economic program by targets. It was voted by parliament on 29 June 2011, in the midst of the huge demonstrations and the Greek indignants movement. It is known in Greece as Mesoprothesmo (the mid-term plan). It includes rise taxes for those with a yearly income of over €8,000, an extra tax for those with a yearly income of over €12,000 among others. On 11 August 2011 the government introduced more taxes, this time targeted at people owning immovable property. The new tax is paid through the owner's electricity bill.

=== Fifth austerity package (October 2011) ===
The Fifth austerity package aimed to ensure the 6th bailout installment for Greece. The representatives of creditors required Greece to take new measures in order to limit the state expenditures, one of the conditions so that the financing of Greek economy to continue normally. The new bill (frequently called multi-bill) impacted mostly civil servants and the retirees. It was voted on by the Greek parliament on 20 October 2011 amid protests. The bill included, among other provisions, significant wage reductions for civil servants through the implementation of a unified payroll system, and pension cuts for amounts exceeding 1,000 euros.

=== Sixth austerity package and reforms (February 2012) ===
The Sixth austerity package emerged from negotiations for austerity measures that would allow further loans, a "haircut" (debt write-off for private debtors), and a second bailout package to prevent sovereign default. As a result, Greece was granted by the EU a €100bn loan and 50% debt reduction through "private sector involvement" (PSI) as a quid pro quo for future reductions in government spending . The measures included among other 22% cut in minimum wage that goes to €586 from €750 per month.

=== Seventh austerity package and reforms (October–November 2012) ===
The Seventh austerity package emerged as a result of negotiation of Greece with creditors for the definition of a new economic program, the mid-term plan 2013–2016. A first part of the multi-bill was voted on 31 October and concerned the privatisations. The main part of the bill was voted on 7 November 2012 and includes labour market reforms and budgetary changes such as the total abolition of 13th and 14th month salaries among them.

=== Eighth austerity package and reforms (April–July 2013) ===
The Eighth austerity package included two successive multi-bill with urgent measures so that Greece to receive the new instalment of the bailout package. Both was a requirement of the creditors in order to be given the next bailout instalments. It included layoff of another 15,000 public employees among them school guards and municipal policemen. The first multi-bill was voted by the parliament on 28 April 2013 and the second was voted by the parliament on 17 July 2013.

=== Ninth austerity package and reforms (May 2014) ===
The Ninth austerity package was imported by the government in April 2014 and was approved by parliament on 9 May 2014 with 150 votes for and 119 against. It included provisions about Greek economic policy during the four next years, under the title Medium-term Fiscal Strategy plan 2015–2018. The bill provided freeze of wages and pensions over a period of the next four years, until 2018. Also it provided cuts public sector's expenses such as cuts for the expenses of the Ministry of Health among others.

=== Tenth austerity package and reforms (July 2015) ===
The Tenth austerity package emerged from the agreement of Greece with eurozone for a new 86 billion euros bailout over three years. The deal requires the Greek parliament to approve the measures. The first set of new austerity package was voted by Greek parliament on 16 July 2015. It includes transfer of many products in the high rate VAT (23%) and rise of corporation tax from 26% to 29% for small companies among others. A second set of measures voted on 23 July 2015 that concerns the Code of Civil Procedure.

=== Eleventh austerity package (August 2015) ===
The Eleventh austerity package included the bill that concerned the third bailout agreement between Greece and the 'quartet' of creditors (EU, ECB, ESM and IMF). It was approved on 14 August 2015 with 222 votes for, 64 votes against. Another 14 deputies abstained or were absent. The new bill included provisions for the rise of various taxes and changes in the retirement system.

=== Twelfth austerity package (October 2015) ===
The twelfth austerity package voted in October 2015 and includes the required measures to unlock a tranche of loans worth 2 billion euros.

=== Thirteenth austerity package (May 2016) ===
The thirteenth austerity package passed on 8 May 2016 by 153 votes in favour to 144 against. It included pension and taxes reforms to the tune of 5.4 billion euros. The measures included pensions cuts, increase of VAT to 24% and others.

The Medium-term Fiscal Strategy Framework 2018–2021 voted on 19 May 2017 introduced amendments of the provisions of the thirteenth austerity package.

=== Fourteenth austerity package (May 2017) ===
The fourteenth austerity package passed on 18 May 2017 by 153 votes in favour to 128 against. It included more pension cuts and tax changes.

== Economic and social effects of austerity measures ==
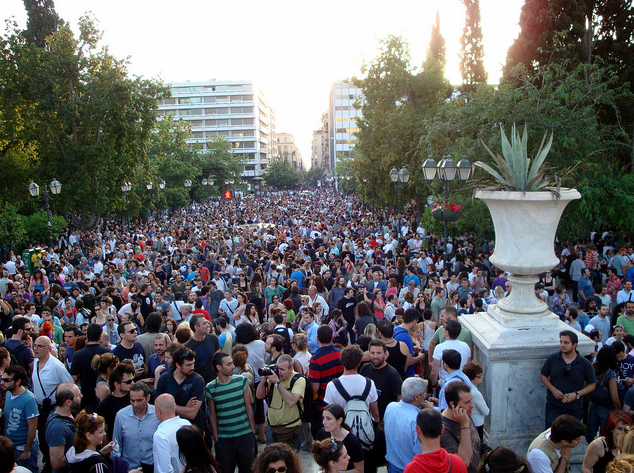
Protests in Athens on 25 May 2011

In exchange for European funding Greece was forced to impose strict fiscal austerity. As early as 2010 some economists expressed fears that the negative impact of tighter fiscal policy could offset the positive impact of lower borrowing costs and social disruption could have a significantly negative impact on investment and growth in the longer term. In a 2003 study that analysed 133 IMF austerity programmes, the IMF's independent evaluation office found that policy makers consistently underestimated the disastrous effects of rigid spending cuts on economic growth.

US economist Joseph Stiglitz has also criticised the EU for being too slow to help Greece, insufficiently supportive of the new government, lacking the will power to set up sufficient "solidarity and stabilisation framework" to support countries experiencing economic difficulty, and too deferential to bond rating agencies.

Overall the increase in the share of the population living at "risk of poverty or social exclusion" was not significant during the first 2-year of the crisis. The figure was measured to 27.6% in 2009 and 27.7% in 2010 (and only slightly worse than the EU27-average at 23.4%), but for 2011 the estimated figure rose sharply above 33%. According to an IMF official, austerity measures have helped Greece bring down its primary deficit before interest payments, from €24.7bn (10.6% of GDP) in 2009 to just €5.2bn (2.4% of GDP) in 2011, but as a side-effect they also contributed to a worsening of the Greek recession, which began in October 2008 and only became worse in 2010 and 2011. By 2012, wages have been cut to the level of the late 1990s. Purchasing power equals that of 1986.

Overall the Greek GDP had its worst decline in 2011 with −6.9%, a year where the seasonal adjusted industrial output ended 28.4% lower than in 2005, and with 111,000 Greek companies going bankrupt (27% higher than in 2010). As a result, the seasonally adjusted unemployment rate also grew from 7.5% in September 2008 to a record high of 25.1% in July 2012, while the youth unemployment rate during the same time rose from 22.0% to as high as 55%.

In an economy without a welfare regime to speak of, the impact of five consecutive years of recession has taken its toll. Charitable foundations that used to fund educational programmes have taken a big hit themselves in their bank deposits and have now shifted to paying for soup kitchens on the streets of Athens. Neighbourhoods are marked by buildings that owners are desperate to sell or rent and a major increase in the homeless sleeping rough. Almost half of Greece's young people are unemployed, as are one in five of their older peers. Despondency is everywhere, despite the "rescue". If future Greek governments keep to the terms of the bailout, by 2020 public debt will be back to what it was when the crisis erupted in 2009.

"[F]ood aid, in a western European capital?" remarked one appalled BBC journalist, before observing: "You do not measure a people's ability to survive in percentages of Gross Domestic Product." Another BBC reporter wrote: "As you walk around the streets of Athens and beyond you can see the social fabric tearing." The social effects of the austerity measures on the Greek population have been severe, as well as on poor and needy foreign immigrants, with some Greek citizens turning to NGOs for healthcare treatment and having to give up children for adoption.

The suicide rate in Greece used to be the lowest in Europe, but by March 2012 it had increased by 40%; Dimitris Christoulas, a 77-year-old pensioner, shot himself outside the Greek parliament in April because the austerity measures had "annihilated all traces for my survival". Patients with chronic conditions attending treatment at state hospitals in Athens are told to bring their own prescription drugs.

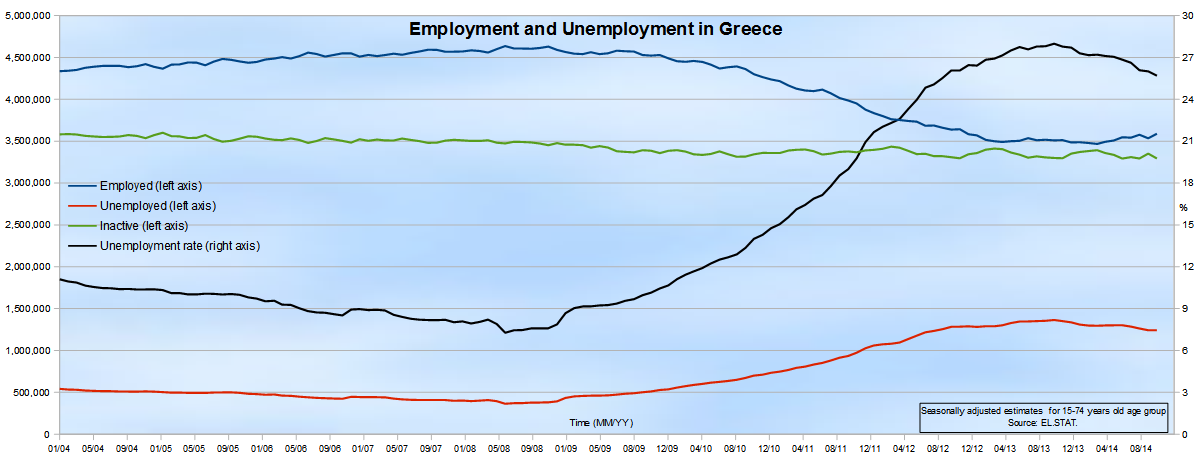
Employment and unemployment in Greece over time.

In June the previous year, at the time of the Greek parliaments approval of the fourth austerity package, an independent United Nations official had cautioned that this additional package of austerity in Greece could potentially pose a violation of human rights, if it were implemented without careful consideration to the population's need for "food, water, adequate housing and work under fair and equitable conditions". On 17 October 2011 Minister of Finance Evangelos Venizelos announced that the government would establish a new fund, aimed at helping those who were hit the hardest from the government's austerity measures. The money for this agency will come from the proceeds made by tackling tax evasion.

In February 2012, it was reported that 20,000 Greeks had been made homeless during the preceding year, and that 20 per cent of shops in the historic city centre of Athens were empty. The same month, Poul Thomsen, a Danish IMF official overseeing the Greek austerity programme, warned that ordinary Greeks were at the "limit" of their toleration of austerity, and he called for a higher International recognition of "the fact that Greece has already done a lot fiscal consolidation, at a great cost to the population"; and moreover cautioned that although further spending cuts were certainly still needed, they should not be implemented rapidly, as it was crucial first to give some more time for the implemented economic reforms to start to work. Estimates in mid-March 2012 were that an astonishing one in 11 residents of greater Athens—some 400,000 people—were visiting a soup kitchen daily.

Prominent UK economist Roger Bootle summarised the state of play at the end of February 2012:

Since the beginning of 2008, Greek real GDP has fallen by more than 17pc. On my forecasts, by the end of next year, the total fall will be more like 25pc. Unsurprisingly, employment has also fallen sharply, by about 500,000, in a total workforce of about 5 million. The unemployment rate is now more than 20pc. . . . A 25pc drop is roughly what was experienced in the US in the Great Depression of the 1930s. The scale of the austerity measures already enacted makes you wince. In 2010 and 2011, Greece implemented fiscal cutbacks worth almost 17pc of GDP. But because this caused GDP to wilt, each euro of fiscal tightening reduced the deficit by only 50 cents. . . . Attempts to cut back on the debt by austerity alone will deliver misery alone.

== See also ==
- The role of the Institute of International Finance in the Greek debt crisis
- List of acronyms: European sovereign-debt crisis

Analogous:

- 1998 Russian financial crisis
- Argentine economic crisis (1999–2002)
- Vulture fund
