= Corruption in Greece =

Corruption in Greece is considered to be significant, with the country ranking as one of the most corrupt in the European Union according to the Corruption Perception Index. Transparency International stated in 2012 that corruption had played a major role in causing the Greek financial crisis. Tax evasion was described by Greek politicians as "a national sport"—with up to €30 billion per year going uncollected, according to a 2012 estimate. A 2016 estimate indicated that between €11 billion and €16 billion per annum were not collectable. Other significant amounts were uncollected due to VAT (sales tax) fraud and smuggling. In 2016, the OECD, Greece and the European Commission launched a project to increase integrity and reduce corruption in Greece through the technical empowerment of the Greek authorities for the implementation of Greece's National Anti-Corruption Action Plan (NACAP).

Political corruption is also acknowledged as a significant problem by many observers.

The government's anti-corruption efforts have been evaluated as ineffective, according to several sources, which has been attributed to poor enforcement of anti-corruption legislation and the ineffectiveness of anti-corruption agencies. Anti-corruption agencies have been hindered by excessive political influence and continuous replacement of staff. Recent involvement of high-ranking public officials in corruption cases has been reported in the media.

== Historical origins ==
Commentators both within and outside Greece have attributed the prevalence of corruption in the country to the legacy of Ottoman rule. In Ottoman-occupied Greece, tax resistance became a form of patriotism, and sometimes a condition for survival, while corruption was widespread among the officials of the empire, especially during its later centuries. Property and commercial tax systems were left in shambles.

Greece became independent in 1830, but the corruption in modern Greece and the resistance to pay taxes to the Ottoman Empire is also connected to the fact that part of the ethnic Greek officials of the empire, the kodjabashis, kept their positions after Greek independence and initially dictated how the Greek state was run. Immediately after independence, Greeks were subjected to a heavy tax burden due to the debt accumulated during the independence war, further exacerbating the poverty and devastation caused by the war. Tax evasion was, however, a larger problem among high-ranking officials, who were accustomed to being unchecked by the Ottomans and sought to preserve that status in the Greek state.

== Extent of Greek tax evasion and corruption ==
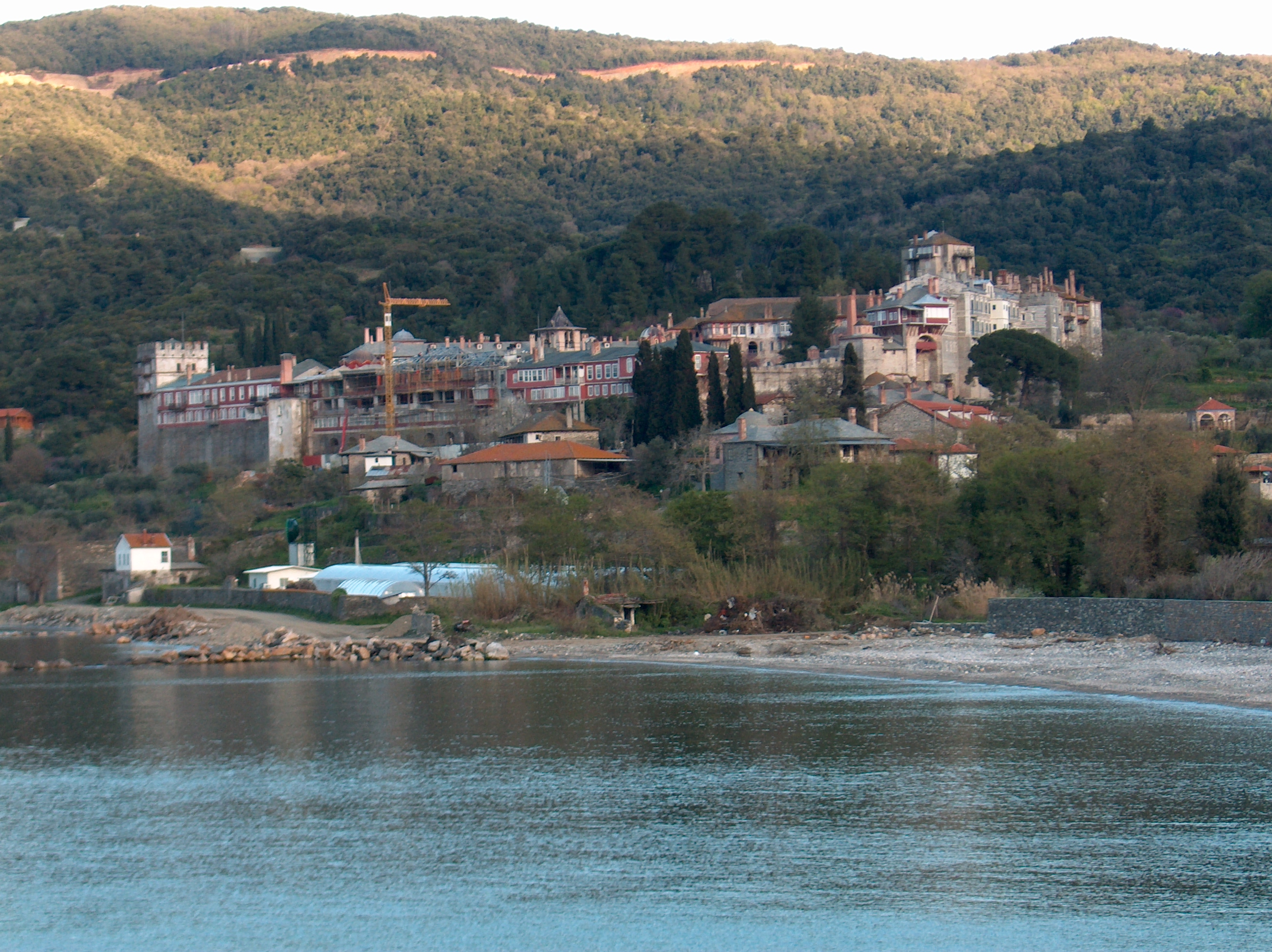
Vatopedi monastery, which dates from the 10th century. The leadership of the monastery was allegedly involved in corrupt activities, working in collusion with corrupt Greek government officials to embezzle government funds.

Corruption Perceptions Index 2008 (before the Greek debt crisis): Worst EU Performers
Country	CPI Score 2008 (World Rank)
Bulgaria	3.6 (72)
Romania	3.8 (70)
Poland	4.6 (58)
Lithuania	4.6 (58)
Greece	4.7 (57)
Italy	4.8 (55)
Latvia	5.0 (52)
Slovakia	5.0 (52)
Hungary	5.1 (47)
Czech Republic	5.2 (45)
Malta	5.8 (36)
Portugal	6.1 (32)

Before the crisis, Greece was one of the EU's worst performers according to Transparency International's Corruption Perception Index (see table below);

By 2025, Greece scored 50 on a scale from 0 ("highly corrupt") to 100 ("very clean"). This is a different scoring system from the one used in 2008, so the 2008 and 2024 scores are not directly comparable. When ranked by its 2025 score, Greece ranked 56th among the 182 countries in the global Index, where the country ranked first is perceived to have the most honest public sector. Regionally, the best score among Western European and European Union countries (Note: Austria, Belgium, Bulgaria, Croatia, Cyprus, Czechia, Denmark, Estonia, Finland, France, Germany, Greece, Hungary, Iceland, Ireland, Italy, Latvia, Lithuania, Luxembourg, Malta, Netherlands, Norway, Poland, Portugal, Romania, Slovakia, Slovenia, Spain, Sweden, Switzerland, and the United Kingdom.) was 89, the average score was 64 and the worst score was 40. Globally, the best score was 89 (ranked 1), the average score was 42, and the worst score was 9 (ranked 181, in a two-way tie).

Shadow Economy (% of GDP) in 2017 (Selected EU Countries)
Country	Shadow Economy (% of GDP)
Estonia	24.6
Malta	23.6
Hungary	22.4
Slovenia	22.4
Poland	22.2
Greece	21.5
Italy	19.8
Spain	17.2
Belgium	15.6
France	12.8
Sweden	12.1
Germany	10.4

Data for 2012 indicated that the Greek "shadow economy" or "underground economy", from which little or no tax was collected, was a full 24.3% of GDP - compared with 28.6% for Estonia, 26.5% for Latvia, 21.6% for Italy, 17.1% for Belgium, 14.7% for Sweden, 13.7% for Finland, and 13.5% for Germany (the situation had improved for Greece, along with most EU countries, by 2017). For Greece, where the percentage of self-employed was more than double the EU average in 2013, a well-known pattern is followed, where tax evasion is correlated with the percentage of the working population that is self-employed.

Several successive Greek governments had in the past attempted to improve the situation. A rapid increase in government revenues through implementing a more effective tax collection system has been recommended. Implementing the proper reforms, however estimated to be a slow process, requiring at least two legislative periods before they start to work.

In the last quarter of 2005, 49% of the companies inspected by the tax authorities were found to have committed tax offences while in January 2006, it fell to 41.6%. A study by researchers from the University of Chicago concluded that tax evasion in 2009 by self-employed professionals alone in Greece (accountants, dentists, lawyers, doctors, personal tutors and independent financial advisers) was €28 billion or 31% of the budget deficit that year.

The Tax Justice Network has said that there are over €20 billion in Swiss bank accounts held by Greeks. The former Finance Minister of Greece, Evangelos Venizelos, was quoted as saying "Around 15,000 individuals and companies owe the taxman 37 billion euros". Additionally, the TJN puts the number of Greek-owned offshore companies to over 10,000.

A mid-2017 report indicated Greeks have been "taxed to the hilt" and many believed that the risk of penalties for tax evasion was less serious than the risk of bankruptcy. One method of evasion is the so-called black market, grey economy or shadow economy: work is done for cash payment which is not declared as income; as well, VAT is not collected and remitted. A January 2017 report by the DiaNEOsis think-tank indicated that unpaid taxes in Greece at the time totaled approximately 95 billion euros, up from 76 billion euros in 2015, much of which was expected to be uncollectable. Another early 2017 study estimated that the loss to the government as a result of tax evasion was between 6% and 9% of the country's GDP, or roughly between 11 billion and 16 billion euros per annum.

The shortfall in the collection of VAT (sales tax) is also significant. In 2014, the government collected 28% less than was owed to it; this shortfall was about double the average for the EU. The uncollected amount that year was about 4.9 billion euros. The DiaNEOsis study estimated that 3.5% of GDP is lost due to VAT fraud, while losses due to smuggling of alcohol, tobacco and petrol amounted to approximately another 0.5% of the country's GDP.

=== Fakelaki ===
In Greek, fakelaki means "little envelope" but is also used in Greek popular culture as a jargon term referring to the bribery of public servants and private companies by Greek citizens in order to "expedite" service. According to this practice, sums of money are stuffed in the files and passed across the desk to secure appointments, document approval and permits. The term was mainly associated with the corruption amongst the doctors of the National Healthcare Service (ESY).

== Government efforts at revenue collection ==
Following similar actions by the United Kingdom and Germany, the Greek government is in talks with Switzerland to tax bank accounts in Switzerland owned by Greek citizens. In late 2011, the Ministry of Finance revealed that Greek Swiss bank account holders will either have to pay a tax or reveal information such as the identity of the bank account holder to the Greek internal revenue services. The Greek and Swiss governments were hoping to reach a deal on the matter by the end of 2011 but that deadline was not met.

Estimates in 2015 indicated that the amount of Greeks' evaded taxes stored in Swiss banks was around 80 billion euros. By then, a tax treaty to address this issue was finally under serious negotiation between the Greek and Swiss governments. An agreement was ratified by Switzerland on 1 March 2016, creating a new tax transparency law that would allow for a more effective battle against tax evasion. Starting in 2018, banks in both Greece and Switzerland will exchange information about the bank accounts of citizens of the other country to minimize the possibility of hiding untaxed income.

=== Anticorruption measures ===
The Inspector General of Public Administration has started an online census of civil servants. In connection with this census, he has uncovered a number of offenses.

The OECD, the Greek government and the European Commission, developed a project to fight corruption, the National Anti-Corruption Action Plan (NACAP). It was scheduled to operate from October 2016 to December 2017, with some of the funding provided by the European Commission. In April 2017, the country's health ministry announced an electronic platform designed to tackle corruption in the healthcare system. Health Minister Andreas Xanthos made this comment: "We believe that a new culture is needed, another style of the social health system, to convince patients that they can be offered services with dignity without seeking connections with people in charge or financial transactions."

=== Tax collection improvements ===
In 2010, the government implemented a tax reform. The year 2012 saw the introduction of a duty on non-cash payments for amounts over 1,500 euros.

The Greek police have established a special unit, that deals exclusively with tax offenses. Germany has offered experts from its financial management and tax investigation office to help build a more efficient tax administration. However, months later, it was not clear whether Greek officials would accept the offer.

In November 2011, Greek finance minister Evangelos Venizelos called upon anyone who owed the state more than 150,000 euros to pay their outstanding taxes by 24 November or find their names on a black list published on the Internet. The government later revealed the list, which also includes a number of prominent Greeks, including pop stars and sportsmen.

=== Forokarta ===
The Forokarta is a "tax card" proposed by the government of Greece in August 2011, which would be used to facilitate collection of receipts for purchases; this would allow the Greek finance ministry to clamp down on rampant tax evasion by comparing individuals' spending to their income, and by comparing business' actual revenues to their accounts. As of 2015, this measure is largely defunct and can be considered a failed project.

=== Electronic payments to fight tax avoidance ===
In 2016 and 2017, the government was encouraging the use of credit cards or debit cards to pay for goods and services in order to reduce cash-only payments. By January 2017, taxpayers were only granted tax allowances or deductions when payments were made electronically, with a "paper trail" of the transactions that the government could easily audit. This was expected to reduce the problem of businesses taking payments but not issuing an invoice; that tactic had been used by various companies to avoid payment of VAT (sales) tax as well as income tax.

By 28 July 2017, numerous businesses were required by law to install a point of sale (POS) device to enable them to accept payment by credit or debit card. Failure to comply with the electronic payment facility can lead to fines of up to 1,500 euros. The requirement applied to around 400,000 firms or individuals in 85 professions. The greater use of electronic payments was one of the factors that had already achieved significant increases in VAT collection in 2016.

== Lagarde list ==
The Greek government has not completed an investigation of a list of 1,991 people purported to hold accounts with Swiss bank HSBC that it received in 2010 from former French finance minister Christine Lagarde. Initially, officials claimed at various times to have lost or misplaced the information. On 29 October 2012, the government changed its position saying it would not use stolen information to prosecute suspected offenders. Instead, Greek authorities arrested Kostas Vaxevanis, journalist and editor of the weekly magazine Hot Doc, who published the "Lagarde list". He was charged with breaching privacy laws that could have seen him sentenced to two years in prison. However, after a trial lasting only a day, he was acquitted. Another trial, in 2015, found the former Minister of Economy, Giorgos Papakonstantinou, guilty of document distortion. Following expulsion from his party PASOK, he received a one-year suspended sentence for misdemeanour over his handling of the infamous "Lagarde list". The court found him guilty of removing the names of three relatives of about 2,000 Greeks with money overseas.

The list includes an advisor to former Greek prime minister Antonis Samaras, as well as a former minister and a member of Samaras' New Democracy political party. The list also contains the names of officials in the finance ministry.

Mr Vaxevanis said he thought the government had not acted on the list because it included friends of ministers, businessmen and powerful publishers. He also accused much of the Greek media of ignoring the story. "The Greek press is muzzled", he said. "There is a closed system of power in Greece, wielded by the political elite, businessmen and journalists."

== Corruption cases ==
- Paradikastiko scandal
- Siemens Greek bribery scandal
- Koskotas scandal
- Yugoslav corn scandal
- Koriopolis, match fixing in football
- Greek Financial Audit, 2004
- Greek financial audits, 2009–2010
- Novartis scandal

== See also ==
- Hellenic Statistical Authority
- Crime in Greece
- Greek government-debt crisis
- Police corruption in Greece
- Taxation in Greece
- Media corruption

== External resources ==
- Greece Corruption Profile from the Business Anti-Corruption Portal
- Michael Lewis, "Beware of Greeks Bearing Bonds." Vanity Fair, 1 October 2010.
- http://www.ekathimerini.com/4dcgi/_w_articles_wsite2_1_05/11/2013_526451
- Income tax#Transparency and public disclosure
- https://www.nytimes.com/2010/02/14/business/yourtaxes/14disclose.html
- http://usatoday30.usatoday.com/news/world/2008-06-18-salaries_N.htm
