= Dimosthenis Sofianos =

Journalist and TV presenter in Greece

Dimosthenis Sofianos (born October 4, 1934) is a journalist, TV presenter and commentator on political issues in Athens, Greece.

Resident in Athens since birth, he graduated from Anargyrios & Korgialenios School of Spetses, Greece and obtained a degree in design and graphic arts.

From a young age, talented, and with great verbal and oral communication skills, he was involved with journalism and reporting. He published numerous articles, travelled throughout the world and published a collection of poems, "Stallides".

He served in the Hellenic Army as an officer, lectured on materials technology and researched in physics, presenting work on the "Theory of mutation of the Universe".

Dimosthenis Sofianos was initially involved in Greek politics in 1989, as head of the "New Politicians -ΝΕΟΙ ΠΟΛΙΤΙΚΟΙ" party, in the 1989 European Parliament elections. He has been an active member of the "Hellenic Political Society -ΕΛΛΗΝΙΚΗ ΠΟΛΙΤΙΚΗ ΕΤΑΙΡΕΙΑ", a founding member of "EM-SU Greece", a candidate Member of the Hellenic Parliament and an elected consultant of the Athens Chamber of Commerce. As a foreign press correspondent and foreign press associate with the Greek President's Office, he was elected the first president and is today the first vice president of the "European Press Association of Journalists -ΕΝΩΣΗ ΔΗΜΟΣΙΟΓΡΑΦΩΝ ΕΥΡΩΠΑΙΚΟΥ ΤΥΠΟΥ", president of the board of directors of the "European Journalist Club -ΕΥΡΩΠΑΙΚΗ ΛΕΣΧΗ ΔΗΜΟΣΙΟΓΡΑΦΩΝ" and remained president of the "Union of members of the ACCI -ΕΝΩΣΗ ΜΕΛΩΝ ΕΒΕΑ" until 2002.

His work, as a freelance journalist, has been published in numerous newspapers and magazines in Greece. He is a regular contributor in magazine Expression and since 1995 a permanent correspondent for "TV Thessaloniki", known for the wide variety of subjects and rigidness of his articles. He was a regular commentator with the Radio Station 110, 1 FM, presenting the live talk show "Politiki Enhmerosh" with audience participation.

Dimosthenis Sofianos was a regular presenter of the Greek Radio Program W-CAR and W-NZK "Station of the Nations" in Detroit, USA for many years, updating and motivating the Greek community on national affairs.

Since 2013, he is a regular contributor and correspondent in the U.S. based Greek internet radio program mana ellada.

Since 1999, he was presenting the TV program "Citizens hour-ΩΡΑ ΤΟΥ ΠΟΛΙΤΗ" in Greek TV Channel "THLETORA" with the participation of a live audience.

He has been presenting the political TV programs "Speech at first -ΕΝ ΕΡΧΗ ΕΙΝΑΙ Ο ΛΟΓΟΣ" in channel "THLEASTY", the "ΩΡΑ ΤΟΥ ΠΟΛΙΤΗ" in TV channel "BLUE SKY" and the live show "Citizen and State -ΠΟΛΙΤΗΣ ΚΑΙ ΠΟΛΙΤΕΙΑ" in channel "TV SEVEN".

He is a regular contributor to Hellenic magazines Expression, VOICE -FONH, International Tribune and holds the "Citizens Column -Η ΣΤΗΛΗ ΤΟΥ ΠΟΛΙΤΗ" in Athens Sunday paper ΕΛΕΥΘΕΡΗ ΩΡΑ ΤΗΣ ΚΥΡΙΑΚΗΣ.

Dimosthenis Sofianos is an active supporter of the free economy and the freedom of choice and is fighting to reduce bureaucracy, limit injustice and to support the citizens' rights with a view to improving the relationship of citizens and state in Greece.
