= Political scandal =

Political action causing general public outrage

In politics, a political scandal is an action or event regarded as morally or legally wrong and causing general public outrage. Politicians, government officials, party officials and lobbyists can be accused of various illegal, corrupt, unethical or sexual practices. Politicians and officials who are embroiled in scandals are more likely to retire or get lower vote shares.

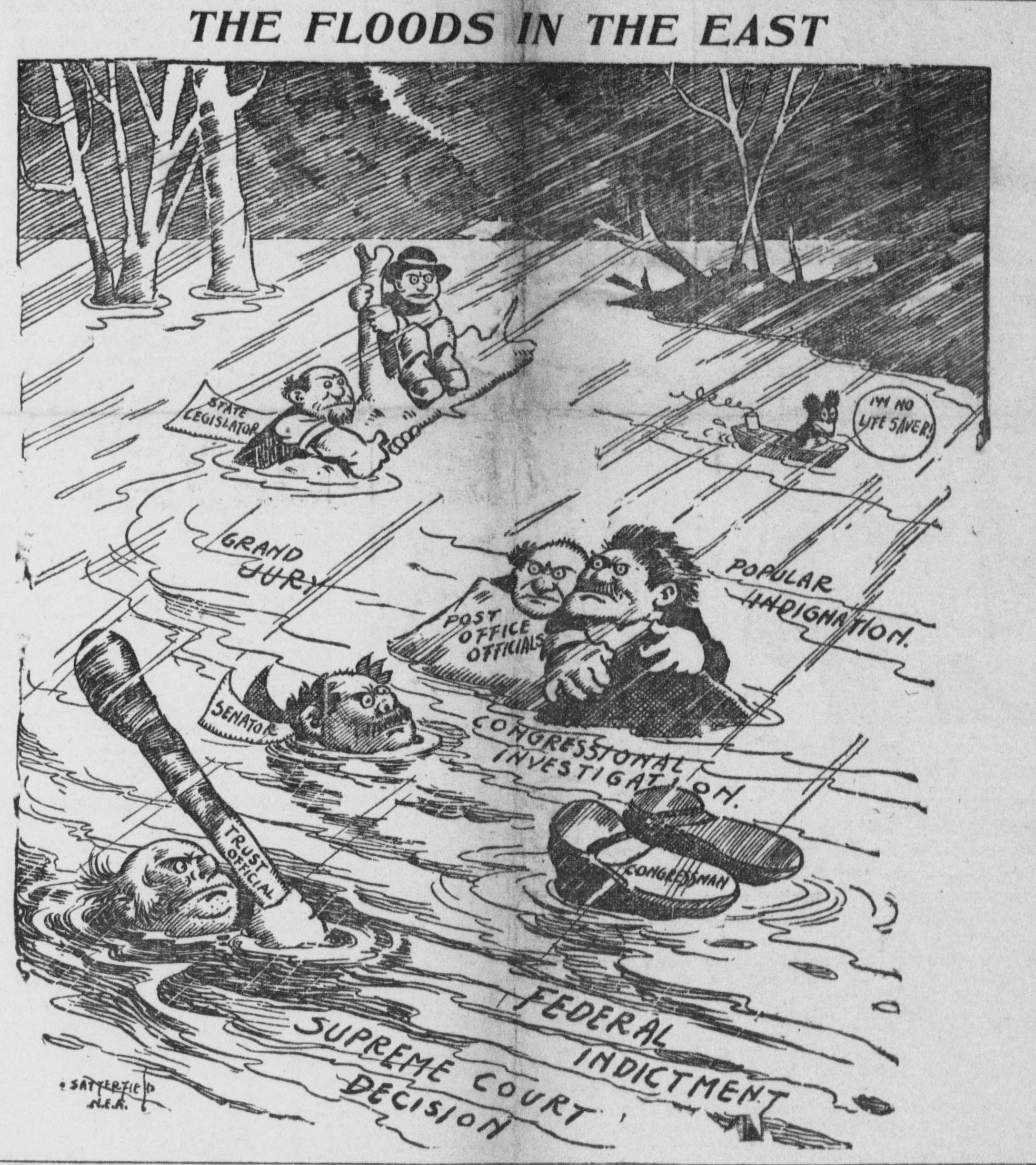
In the spring of 1904, many parts of the Northeastern United States experienced severe flooding. Bob Satterfield portrayed politicians, bureaucrats, etc., trapped in the floods – which are not of water, but of scandal (April 9, 1904).

== Journalism ==
Scandal sells, and broadsides, pamphlets, newspapers, magazines and the electronic media have covered it in depth. The Muckraker movement in American journalism was a component of the Progressive Era in the U.S. in the early 20th century. Journalists have built their careers on exposure of corruption and political scandal, often acting on behalf of the opposition party.

The political ideology of media owners plays a role—they prefer to target the opposition but will reluctantly cover their own side. Journalists have to frame the story in terms of the audience's values and expectations to maximize the impact.

== Lists by country ==
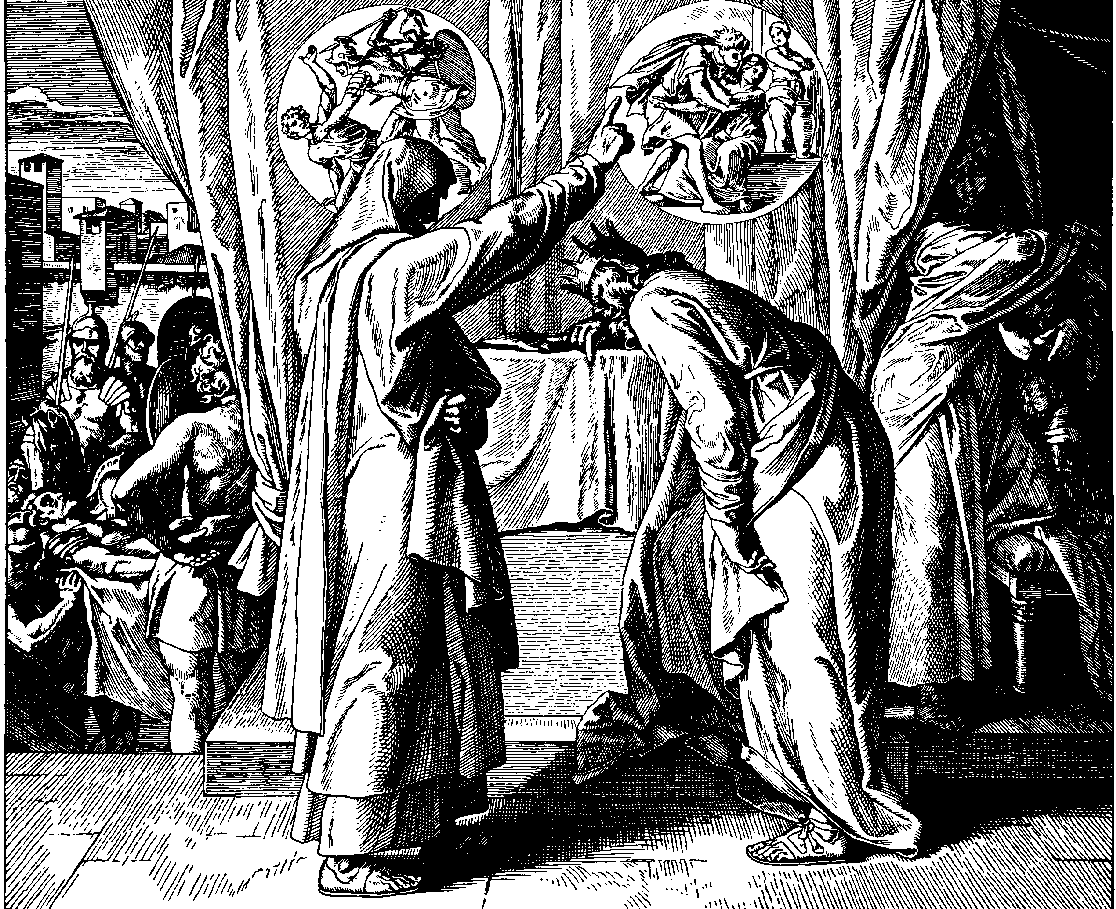
Nathan confronts David over his sex scandal with Bathsheba the wife of Uriah the Hittite, saying "by this deed you have given occasion to the enemies of the LORD to blaspheme" (2 Samuel 12:14).

- Albania – Political scandals of Albania
- Argentina – List of political scandals in Argentina
- Australia – List of Australian political controversies
- Austria – List of political scandals in Austria
- Belgium – Belgian political scandals
- Belize – List of political scandals in Belize
- Canada – List of Canadian political scandals
- Chile – Chilean political scandals
- Colombia – Colombian parapolitics scandal
- European Union – Qatar corruption scandal at the European Parliament
- Finland – List of political scandals in Finland
- France – List of political scandals in France
- Germany – German political scandals
- Greece – List of political scandals in Greece
- Iceland – Icelandic political scandals
- India – Indian political scandals
- Ireland – Irish political scandals
- Italy – Italian political scandals
- Japan – Black Mist Scandal (Japanese politics)
- Lithuania – Corruption in Lithuania
- Malaysia – List of scandals in Malaysia
- New Zealand – List of political scandals in New Zealand
- Philippines – List of political scandals in the Philippines
- Poland - List of political scandals in Poland
- Slovakia – List of Slovak political scandals
- Slovenia – 1975 Zaliv Scandal
- South Korea – Political scandals in South Korea
- Switzerland - Secret files scandal
- Ukraine – List of political scandals in Ukraine
- United Kingdom – List of political scandals in the United Kingdom
- United States – List of federal political scandals in the United States

== See also ==
- Deviancy amplification spiral
- Mass media
- Moral panic
- Sensationalism
- Sex scandal
