= Theodoros Tsoukatos =

Greek politician

Theodoros Tsoukatos (Greek: Θεόδωρος Τσουκάτος; Leonidio, 1952) is a Greek politician and former MP with PASOK.

He received 1 million Deutschmarks in the context of the Siemens scandal, which he claims he transferred to the party fund of PASOK.
