= List of political scandals in Finland =

This article provides a list of political scandals that involve officials from the government or politicians of Finland.

== Transit of German troops through Finland and Sweden (1940) ==
Considered one of the more controversial aspects of modern Nordic history beside Finland's co-belligerence with Nazi Germany in the Continuation War, and the export of Swedish iron ore during World War II.

== Ryti–Ribbentrop Agreement (1944) ==
The agreement, which completely bypassed the Finnish Parliament, was criticized heavily both within Finland and internationally

== Pirkkala handout (1975) ==
Controversies surrounding an educational curriculum.

== Iraq leak (2003) ==
On 6 March 2003, controversy emerged from a statement given by Anneli Jäätteenmäki, leader of the Finnish Centre Party, in a televised election debate prior to the 2003 parliamentary election. Jäätteenmäki accused Paavo Lipponen, the then Prime Minister of Finland, of attaching Finland to George W. Bush's 'coalition of the willing' that was in preparation for the 2003 war in Iraq.

== Campaign finance scandal (2007) ==
In the spring of 2008 a controversy emerged involving campaign funding issues related to the 2007 elections for the Finnish Parliament held on 18 March 2007. The scandal involved mainly the campaign funding of the National Coalition Party and Centre Party candidates.

== Anton Salonen incident (2008) ==
A Finnish-born child was first abducted by his Estonian Russian mother in 2008 and taken to Russia. In turn the boy was abducted by his father in 2009 and smuggled back to Finland with the help of Finnish diplomats stationed at the Finnish consulate in Saint Petersburg. The incident sparked a diplomatic row between Finland and Russia. The Finnish diplomat who helped to abduct the child was dismissed from the Finnish Consulate and Russia declared him persona non grata.

== Partying video (2022) ==
A leaked video showing Prime Minister of Finland Sanna Marin partying caused controversy. She previously apologised for going clubbing after coming into close contact with a Covid-19 case. An inquiry cleared her of misconduct.

== Racism in the Finns Party (2023) ==
The Finns Party were embroiled in racism scandals. Amid this the government faced a motion of no confidence.
