= Taxation in Greece =

Taxation in Greece is based on the direct and indirect systems. The total tax revenue in 2017 was €47.56 billion from which €20.62 billion came from direct taxes and €26.94 billion from indirect taxes. The total tax revenue represented 39.4% of GDP in 2017. Taxes in Greece are collected by the Independent Authority for Public Revenue (Ανεξάρτητη Αρχή Δημοσίων Εσόδων).

== Income tax ==
Income taxation in Greece is progressive. Income tax is payable by all individuals earning income in Greece, regardless of citizenship or place of permanent residence. Permanent residents are taxed on their worldwide income in Greece. An individual in Greece is liable for tax on their income as an employee and on income as a self-employed person. In the case of an individual who is a permanent resident of Greece, their tax owed is calculated on their income earned in Greece and overseas. An individual whose income is only from a wage is not obligated to file an annual return. The employer deducts tax from the employee and transfers it to the tax authority every month.

The 2014 tax rates are as follows:

Income	Taxation
€0 – €25,000	22%
€25,001 – €42,000	32%
> €42,001	42%

On May 9, 2016, a new set of emergency measures were voted in the Parliament by the SYRIZA/ANEL government. These changes include new income tax rates as well as new solidarity tax rates. The tax rates applicable to income earned in 2016 are as follows:

Income	Taxation
€0 – €10,000	9%
€10,001 – €20,000	22%
€20,001 – €30,000	28%
€30,001 – €40,000	36%
> €40,001	44%

The solidarity tax rates are progressive ranging from 2.2% to 10%. They are assigned as follows:

Income	Solidarity tax rate
€0 – €12,000	0%
€12,001 – €20,000	2.2%
€20,001 – €30,000	5%
€30,001 – €40,000	6.5%
€40,001 – €65,000	7.5%
€65,001 – €220,000	9%
> €220,001	10%

But as 1 January 2020 the tax rate for the solidarity contribution will have been amended as in the table below:

Income	Solidarity tax rate
€0 – €30,000	0%
€30,001 – €40,000	2%
€40,001 – €65,000	5%
€65,001 – €220,000	9%
> €220,001	10%

== Social security tax ==
=== Employees ===
An employer is obligated to deduct tax at source from an employee and to make additional contributions to social security as in many other EU member states. The employer's contribution amounts to 24.56% of the salary. The employee's contribution is 15.5%.

=== Self-employed or contractors ===
The basic social security contributions amount to the 27.1% of total income (after VAT paid, qualified expenses deducted and before income tax paid). This number can broken down to 20.0% for public pension funding and 7.1% for the public health system.

An extra 7.0% is charged for people enlisted to added benefits public pension schemes. An extra 4.0% is charged for people enlisted to retirement bonuses public schemes. Thus the total contributions can go as high as 38.1% of income.

Income range for calculation of Social security tax is 4,923 - 70,330 EUR per year. If annual income is out of the range above, the lower/higher limits respectively will be considered for calculation.

Especially for agriculture professionals, the basic contribution of 27.1% will be lower until 2021, as follows:

- 21.1% in 2017
- 23.1% in 2018
- 25.1% in 2019
- 26.1% in 2020
- 26.6% in 2021
- 27.1% in 2022+

Especially for doctors, pharmacists, engineers, lawyers and economists, the total contribution of 27.1-38.1% will be 5-50% lower until 31/12/2020, as follows:

- For total income 0–7,000 EUR 0% lower
- For total income 7,000-13,000 EUR 50% lower
- For total income 13,000-14,000 EUR 49% lower
- For total income 14,000-15,000 EUR 48% lower
- For total income 56,000-57,000 EUR 6% lower
- For total income 57,000-58,000 EUR 5% lower
- For total income 58,000+ 0% lower

== Corporation tax ==
Corporations in Greece are taxed on their income in Greece and from overseas. Foreign companies in Greece are taxed only on income that is generated in Greece. Also, there is 100% advance payment of the taxable amount of the current fiscal year, and is being balanced by each next fiscal year financial data.

Corporate income tax rates by year:

- 2007, 2008, 2009 - 25%
- 2010 - 24%
- 2011, 2012 - 20%
- 2013, 2014 - 26%
- 2015 - 29%
- 2019 - 28%

The corporate income tax rate is to be gradually reduced as follows:

- Late 2019 - 24%
- 2020 - 20%

The planned reduction does not include corporate income tax rate of Greek credit institutions and Greek branches of nonresident credit institutions, which is to remain at 29%.

== Capital gains tax ==
A capital gain in Greece is added to regular income and is taxable at the same rate as regular income for a company, other than in specific instances as defined in law.

A capital gain by an individual in Greece is taxable at the rate of 15%. There is no tax in the case of capital gain from trading in the stock market as long as the individual owns less than 0.5% of the publicly listed company.

== Withholding tax ==
As of 1 Jan 2009, Greece imposes a withholding tax of 10% on corporate dividends, unless the dividend qualifies for application of the EC Parent-Subsidiary Directive or if a lower rate applies under an applicable double tax treaty. It also imposes a withholding tax on interest and royalties, however the tax rates may be reduced or eliminated by an applicable double tax treaty or if the payment qualifies for application of the EC Interest and Royalties Directive.

As of 13 December 2018 the withholding tax rates are as given in the table below:

Type of income	Withholding tax rate
Dividends	10%
Interest	15%
Royalties and other payments	20%
Fees for technical projects, management fees, and consultancy and other related services	20%
By exception, fees received by contractors of every kind of technical projects and lessors of public, municipal, association, or port proceeds	3% on the value of the project under construction or lease payment

== Value added tax ==
Value added tax (VAT) was implemented in to the Greek taxation system in 1987 in order to replace turnover tax and other indirect taxes. The Greek VAT system complies with the European Union value added tax system.

The Value added tax (Φόρος Προστιθέμενης Αξίας) in Greece consists of 3 rates:

- standard rate of 24%
- reduced rate of 13%
- super reduced rate of 6%

The VAT rates applied in the Aegan islands of less than 20,000 inhabitants (24 islands including Leros, Lesbos, Kos, Samos and Chios), are 30% lower than the corresponding rates applied in the mainland, except on tobacco and vehicles. The lower VAT rates applied in these Greek Islands are 4% (super-reduced rate), 9% (reduced rate) and 17% (standard rate). This reduced rate had previously been applied to a varying list of islands along the years.

The standard rate applies to the following categories and to the following goods and services:

- alcoholic beverages, lemonades, clothing, footwear, tobacco, hifi-video, computers, smartphones, E-books, household electrical appliances, furniture, jewels, telecommunication services, energy products (firewood and timber for industrial use), petroleum products ( unleaded petrol, diesel fuel, LPG, heating oil, lubricants), motor vehicles, domestic passenger transport (air, sea, inland waterway, rail and road), international passenger transport (inland waterway, rail, road), bars and cafes, immovable property, treatment of waste and waste water, services supplied by lawyers, art, collector's items and antiques.

The reduced rate applies to the following categories and to the following goods and services:

- foodstuffs, water supplies, pharmaceutical products, medical equipment for disabled persons, children's car seats, books, admission to dance schools and zoos, admission to sporting events, cable TV, writers, composers etc., social housing, renovation and repairing of private dwellings, window cleaning and cleaning in private households, agricultural inputs, restaurant and catering services, use of sporting facilities, supplies by undertakers and cremation services, medical and dental care, bicycles, shoes and leather goods, clothing and household linen.
- mineral water, energy products (natural gas, electricity, district heating), hotels.

The super reduced rate applies to the following categories:

- antiseptics,
- printed newspapers, online audiovisual books, books
- admissions to cinemas, theatres and concerts.

VAT returns are submitted on quarterly or monthly basis, depending on the type of books (single or double-entry books) kept by the VAT payer. Exempted from VAT are those taxable persons whose annual turnover (excluding VAT) is no higher than €10,000 from supply of goods or/and services. Such persons may opt to be exempt from VAT. The exemption does not apply with regard to taxable persons not established in the Greek territory.

== Other taxes ==
=== Real property tax ===
The Real property tax is levied on property, that is located in Greece. The tax composes of two parts, the main tax and the additional tax. The value of the main tax depends on the size, location, zone price, surface, age, use and other characteristics of the taxed property. The additional tax is derived from the total tax value of all the taxpayer's property and it ranges from 0.15% to 1.15% depending on the total value of the property. The additional tax is in effect, if the total value of the taxed property exceeds €250,000.

=== Inheritance tax ===
The Inheritance tax is different for close relatives of the deceased and for other heirs. The former ranges from 1% to 10% of the "tax value" after the deduction of a tax-free amount, depending on the relationship of the taxpayer with the testator. For other heirs, the inheritance tax rate ranges from 0% to 40% of the tax value.

== Tax exemptions ==
There are several cases of Tax exemptions under the Greek taxation system, these are as follows:

- Proceeds from the sale of shares that are traded on the Athens Stock Exchange.
- Income from ships and shipping.
- A dividend received from a Greek company.
- Capital gain from sale of a business between family members, as defined by law.

== Tax deductions ==
The examples of Tax deductibility in Greece are, as with most other features of Greek taxation, similar to that of other Western European and North American nations, that is, tax deductibility for things such as charity and other things as shown below:

- 15% credit on a mortgage for the first residential apartment.
- 15% rent paid on the main residential apartment up to maximum.
- Donations to public, religious and other institutions.
- Compulsory payments to social security.

== Payments ==
- Social security tax is paid 12 times a year.
- VAT tax is paid 3 times a year.
- Income tax is paid once a year.

== See also ==
- Tax evasion and corruption in Greece
