= List of political scandals in Poland =

This is a list of major political scandals in Poland:

- 2001: Corruption related to LFO scandal revealed, investigation ongoing as of 2009
- 2002: Orlengate
- 2002: Rywin affair
- 2005: Wildstein list
- 2005: Allegations that USA had secret prisons (black sites) in Poland (and other countries) have arose, investigations and discussions in Poland continued to at least mid-2010s
- 2007:
  - Oleksy tapes made public
  - Ground affair
- 2014/15: Polish wiretapping scandal
- 2023: Polish cash-for-visa scandal
