= List of political scandals in Ukraine =

This is a list of political scandals in Ukraine.

== Introduction ==
The Verkhovna Rada, the Parliament of Ukraine, has been notorious around the world for its brawls when lawmakers could not reach agreement. Probably one of the most notorious became the fight that occurred on April 27, 2010, which involved egg missiles and smoke bombs.

Several major standoffs have developed out of the Russia–Ukraine gas disputes into a real cold war between Ukraine and Russia which took most of Europe by hostage. The gas issues that had existed since the fall of the Soviet Union became really acute in January 2009. Another continuously addressed and scandalous issue is one concerning a state language and status of the Russian language in Ukraine, which is predominant throughout the country. Trying to reverse the process of russification of Ukraine, the Constitution of Ukraine recognizes the Ukrainian language as the only state language concerning government matters, while still granting the Russian language protection as a regional language. There is also an issue with the state borders that has yet to be finalized, while the Mayor of Moscow (Yuri Luzhkov) continues to release statements in 2008 questioning the status of Sevastopol long after the signing of the treaty on peace and friendship in 1997.

== 1992–1993 ==
- Massandra deals: Black Sea Fleet scandals, gas issue, Ukraine's nuclear arsenal and Budapest Memorandum on Security Assurances
- Incident with the "Afghan Home" in Pechersk, Kyiv

== 1995 ==
- Black Tuesday, clash between government forces and UNSO in connection with the burial of Volodymyr, the Patriarch of Ukrainian Orthodox Church of the Kyivan Patriarchate

== 1997–1999 ==
- Tax Code protests
- Reinstatement of UNA-UNSO
- 25 March 1999: Death of Viacheslav Chornovil

== 2000–2003 ==
- Ukraine without Kuchma (UbK)
  - Oleksandr Moroz revelation, Cassette scandal and Georgiy Gongadze disappearance
  - March 2001 UbK Unrest (Ukraine)
  - Establishment of National Salvation Committee (Ukraine) and involvement of the Ukrainian People's Self Defense (UNSO)
  - Arrest of Yulia Tymoshenko in connection with United Energy Systems of Ukraine (Criminal charges against Tymoshenko proved to be groundless in 2004)
- Siberia Airlines Flight 1812 accident
- Anti-Ukrainian sentiment incident (Bilozir Affair)
- Constitutional Court of Ukraine allowed Leonid Kuchma to run for presidency for the third time, recognized the institution of propiska (inscription) as unconstitutional (long after it was done in the Soviet Union and Russian Federation)
- Statement by the Prosecutor General of Ukraine office, and particularly Svyatoslav Piskun, about involvement of former Hromada members (Pavlo Lazarenko, Yulia Tymoshenko) in the assassination of Ukrainian businessman Yevhen Shcherban in 1996 and the former chairman of National Bank of Ukraine Vadym Hetman in 1998.

== 2004–2005 ==
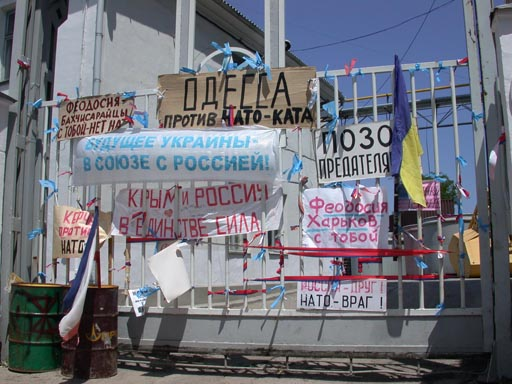
This photo taken on November 6, 2006 in Feodosiya features protester's banners with pro-Russian and anti-NATO rhetoric. Banners proclaim the solidarity of Bakhchisaray, Kerch, Odesa, Kharkov (Kharkiv) with Feodosiyan protesters. Also: "The future of Ukraine is in the union with Russia", "Crimea and Russia: the strength lies in unity", "Russia - friend, NATO - enemy", "Shame to traitors". Banners are written in Russian language.

- Orange Revolution in Ukraine
  - 2004 Ukrainian presidential election
    - Detection and introduction of the carousel voting concept
  - Poisoning of Viktor Yushchenko
- Romania border dispute, Snake Island
- Declaration on establishing of the Southeastern Autonomous Republic and Novorossiysk Krai

== 2005–2007 ==
- The Intensified dialogue between NATO and Government of Ukraine
  - 2006 anti-NATO protests in Feodosiya, Nataliya Vitrenko
  - Announcement of several Russian high-ranking officials persona non grata (Vladimir Zhirinovsky, Konstantin Zatulin) - deterioration of Russia–Ukraine relations
- Formation of parliamentary majority (2006 political crisis)
- 2007 political crisis, 2007 Ukrainian parliamentary election
  - Dismissal of judges of the Constitutional Court of Ukraine, General Prosecutor of Ukraine
- A hunting accident involving Yevhen Kushnaryov

== 2008–2010 ==
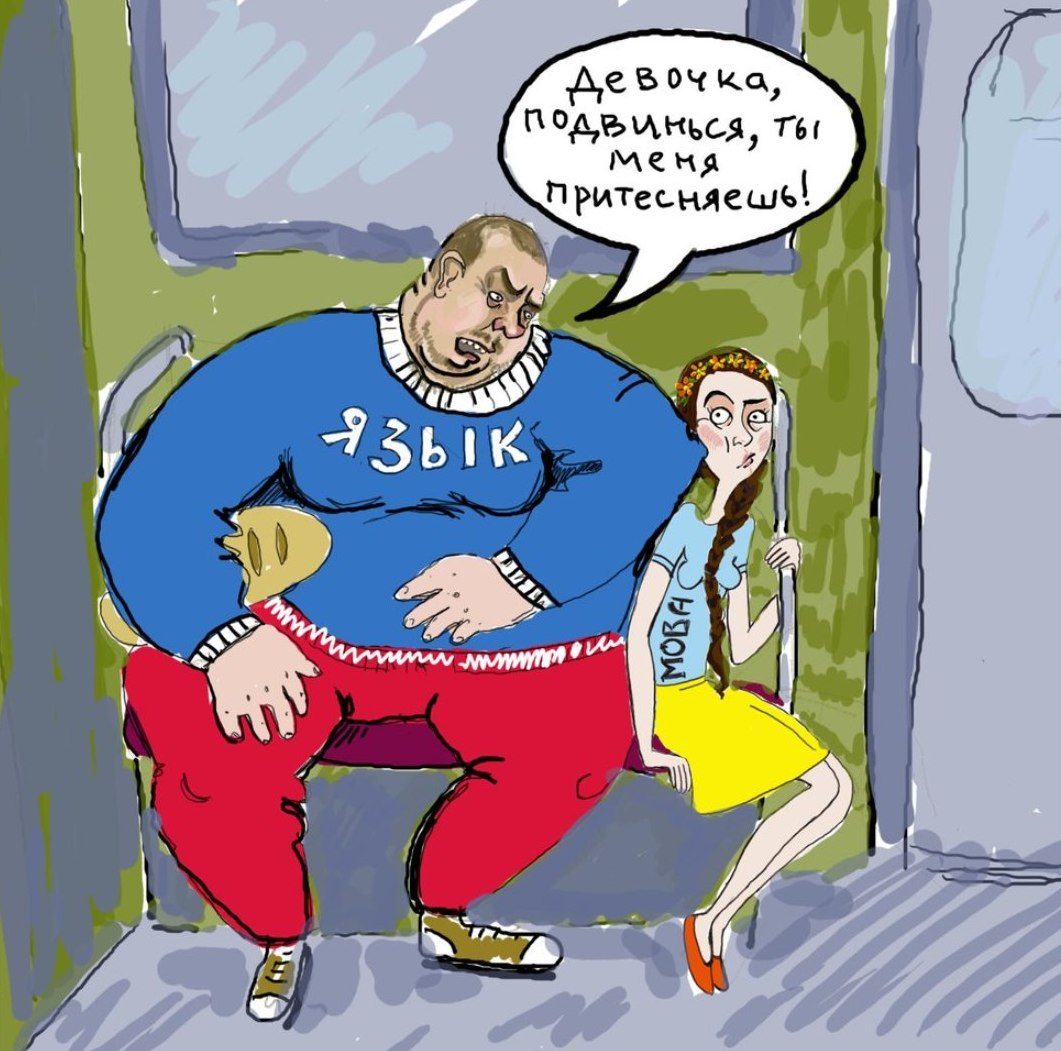
Political caricature from Vidsich. Russian language to Ukrainian: "Hey girl, move a little! You're oppressing me!"

- 2008 South Ossetia war, pro-Georgian sentiments, and crash of Yushchenko
- Party switching in Ukraine, Reversal of amendments to the Constitution of Ukraine
- Kharkiv Accords
- 2010 Ukrainian presidential election
- Anti-Tabachnyk campaign and student human chains against the Minister of Education Dmytro Tabachnyk
  - Vidsich
- Anti-Ukrainian sentiments set out in Odesa by members of pro-Russian party and local Antifa
- Status of national awards questioned (Hero of Ukraine, Shevchenko National Prize)

== 2011–2012 ==
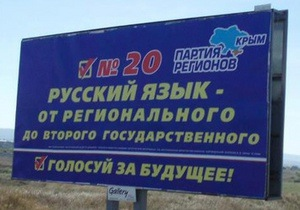
Party of Regions 2012 election poster in Crimea stating "Russian: (upgrade it) from a regional language to the second official language"

- Dictatorship Resistance Committee, prosecution of Yulia Tymoshenko, Yuri Lutsenko and others
- Legislation on languages in Ukraine
- 2012 Ukrainian parliamentary election, mass protesting clashes

== Since 2013 ==
- Do not buy Russian goods!
- Avakov is the devil

== See also ==
- Corruption in Ukraine
- Politics of Ukraine
