= List of political scandals in Austria =

This article provides a list of political scandals that involve officials from the government or politicians of Austria.

== Mayerling incident (1889) ==
The apparent murder–suicide pact of Rudolf, Crown Prince of Austria, and his lover, baroness Mary Vetsera. They were both found dead on 30 January 1889 in an imperial hunting lodge in Mayerling. The following events led to the start of the First World War.

== Cash for influence scandal (2011) ==
The European Commission’s Anti-fraud Office (OLAF) opened a formal investigation for corruption against four Members of European Parliament (MEPs), one of whom was Austrian Ernst Strasser. Strasser later resigned.

== Police raid of BVT (2018) ==
- 2018 Raid of Austria's Federal Office for the Protection of the Constitution and Counterterrorism (BVT) - A police raid on Austria's domestic intelligence agency in February 2018, leading to allegations of political interference and Russian influence.

== Ibiza affair (2019) ==
A scandal involving Heinz-Christian Strache, the former vice chancellor of Austria and leader of the Freedom Party (FPÖ), and Johann Gudenus, a deputy leader of the Freedom Party. They were both secretly filmed meeting a sting operative in Ibiza in July 2017.

== Kurz corruption probe (2021) ==
Chancellor of Austria Sebastian Kurz had his offices raided by anti-corruption prosecutors. Kurz, along with nine high-profile politicians and newspaper executives, has been accused of embezzlement and bribery.
