= Petsas list =

List of Greek media outlets funded during COVID-19

Petsas list (named after the government spokesman by whom it was published, Stelios Petsas) is the name given to a list of mass media outlets (1,232 in total) which received financial reimbursement from the Greek government for promoting the "Stay at Home" ("Μένουμε Σπίτι", Ménoume Spíti) campaign, during the first coronavirus wave in the country.

In total the Mitsotakis government gave out 19,832,132.94 euros. After pressure by the opposition, Petsas, as the government spokesperson, published the list containing the amounts. It was pointed out through journalistic research that less than 1% of the 20 million euros of the campaign were given to outlets opposing the government. For example, Skai received 830,000 euros, Open 450,000, Ta Nea 63,000, I Avgi 10,500, news24/7 75,000 and Iefimerida.gr 250,000. Due to the amounts and the way they were allocated, there were allegations of corruption and lack of pluralism in the media. There were also reactions due to the total exclusion of certain outlets, such as Documento, from the campaign, and the funding of non-existent websites and websites promoting conspiracy theories and pseudoscientific claims. Responding to the criticism towards himself and the government in general for the campaign, Petsas claimed that it was "a campaign which saved lives". However, related academic research found that media funding, when applied in a contentious and opaque manner, can erode media independence and foster negative attitudes towards it.

The edict 475ΒΒ/27-10-2020 announced the second Petsas list, this time exclusively for nationwide terrestrial television channels, giving out a total of 2,000,000 euros. This was followed by the promotion of the vaccination campaign, for 18,500,000 euros and the so called Plevris list for a total of 4,960,000 euros.
