= Politics of Greece =

Greece is a parliamentary representative democratic republic, where the President of Greece is the head of state and the Prime Minister of Greece is the head of government within a multi-party system. Legislative power is vested in both the government and the Hellenic Parliament. Between the restoration of democracy in 1974 and the Greek government-debt crisis, the party system was dominated by the liberal-conservative New Democracy and the social-democratic PASOK up until 2012. From 2012 to 2024, the initially anti-austerity left-wing party Syriza, with its first election victory in January 2015, has taken the previous dominant place of PASOK in the party system.

The judiciary is independent of the executive and the legislature.

The Constitution of Greece, which describes Greece as a "presidential parliamentary republic", includes extensive specific guarantees of civil liberties and vests the powers of the head of state in a president elected by parliament. The Greek governmental structure is similar to that found in many other Western democracies, and has been described as a compromise between the French and German models. The prime minister and cabinet play the central role in the political process, while the president performs some executive and legislative functions in addition to ceremonial duties. Voting in Greece is officially compulsory, but this is not enforced.

== Executive branch ==
The Cabinet of Greece, which is the main organ of the government, includes the heads of all executive ministries, appointed by the president on the recommendation of the prime minister.

=== President ===
The president of the republic is elected by the Parliament for a five-year term (election last held 12 February 2025), and a maximum of two terms in office. When a presidential term expires, Parliament votes to elect the new president. In the first two votes, a 2/3 majority (200 votes) is necessary. The third vote requires a 3/5 (180 votes) majority.

If the third vote is fruitless, Parliament is no longer dissolved. The election for president is repeated immediately with a 3/5 majority required for the initial vote, an absolute majority for the second one (151 votes) and a simple majority for the third and final one. The system is so designed as to promote consensus presidential candidates among the main political parties.

The president has the power to declare war, to grant pardon (forgiveness) and to conclude agreements of peace, alliance, and participation in international organizations; upon the request of the government a simple parliamentary majority is required to confirm such actions, agreements, or treaties. An absolute or a three-fifths majority is required in exceptional cases (for example, the accession into the EU needed a 3/5 majority).

The president can also exercise certain emergency powers, which must be countersigned by the appropriate cabinet minister. The president may not dissolve parliament, dismiss the government, suspend certain articles of the constitution, issue a proclamation or declare a state of siege without countersigning by the prime minister or the appropriate cabinet minister. To call a referendum, they must obtain approval from parliament. They can appoint ministers after they are recommended by the prime minister.

Governments tend to nominate presidential candidates outside their ideological space, since the election of a president used to require at least a 3/5 majority or it resulted in snap elections, and the president is also supposed to unite and represent the entire nation. Sometimes they are chosen from outside the political ranks. Currently, the president of Greece is Konstantinos Tasoulas, the 9th president of Greece since the restoration of democracy in 1974.

=== Prime minister ===
The prime minister is elected by the Parliament and is usually the leader of the party controlling the absolute majority of MPs. According to the Constitution, the prime minister safeguards the unity of the government and directs its activities. Although officially holding the second highest rank as head of the Hellenic government and not the Republic, they are the most powerful person of the Greek political system and recommends ministers to the president for appointment or dismissal. Although officially just head of government, not of state, they conduct professional business and the president is just the supreme executive.

=== Maintaining the support of parliament ===
Greek parliamentary politics hinge upon the principle of the "δεδηλωμένη" (pronounced "dhedhilomeni"), the "declared confidence" of Parliament to the prime minister and his/her administration. This means that the president of the Republic is bound to appoint, as prime minister, a person who will be approved by a majority of the Parliament's members (i.e. 151 votes). With the current electoral system, it is the leader of the party gaining a plurality of the votes in the Parliamentary elections who is appointed prime minister.

An administration may at any time seek a "vote of confidence". Conversely a number of members of parliament may ask that a "vote of reproach" be taken. Both are rare occurrences with usually predictable outcomes as voting outside the party line happens very seldom.

== Legislative branch ==
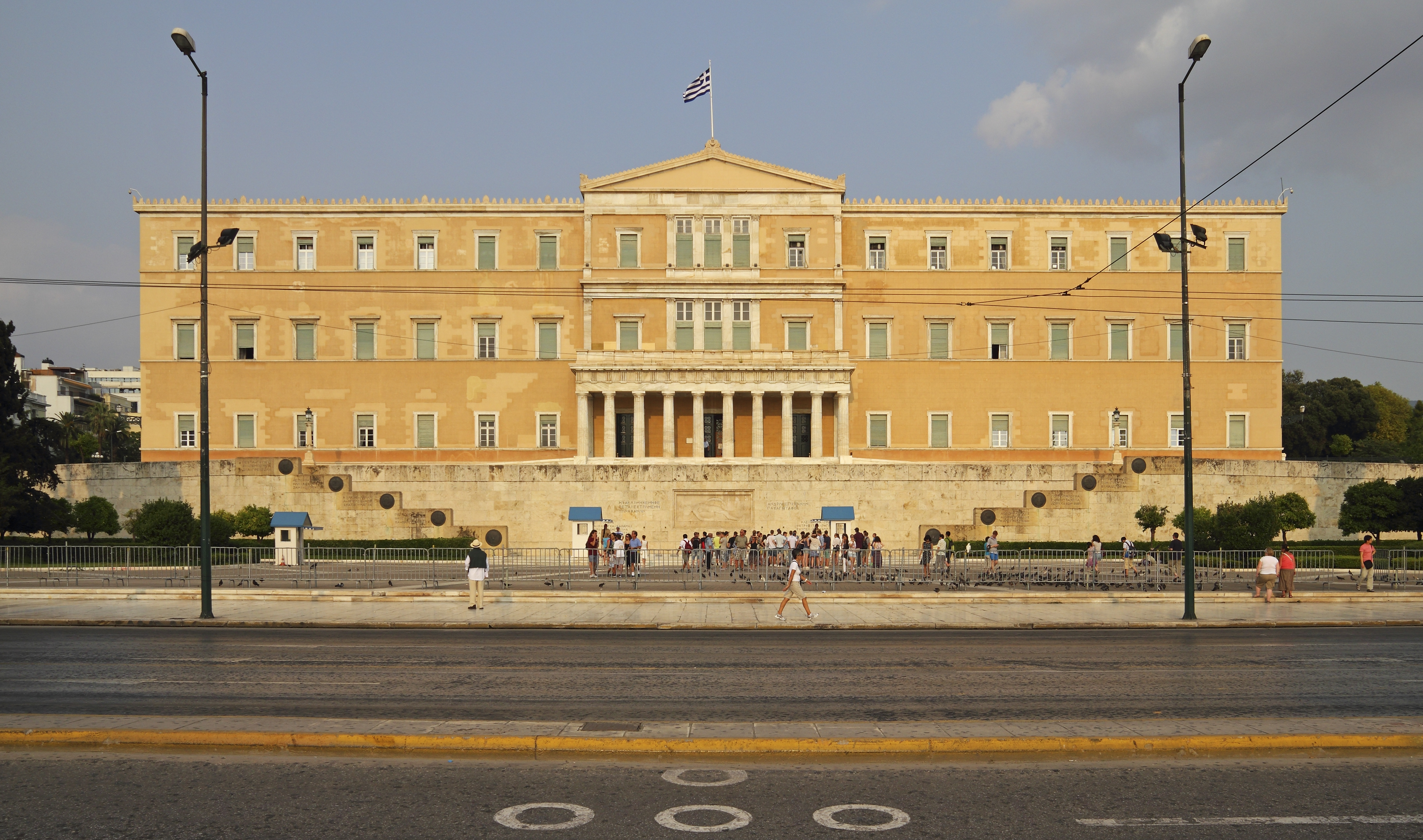
The Greek Parliament building, which was the Old Royal Palace

Greece elects a legislature by universal suffrage of all citizens over the age of 17 (changed in 2018). The Greek Parliament (Βουλή των Ελλήνων) has 300 members, elected for a four-year term by a system of semi-proportional representation in 48 multi-seat constituencies, 8 single-seat constituencies and a single nationwide list. 285 of the 300 seats are determined by constituency voting, and voters may select the candidate or candidates of their choice by marking their name on the party ballot. The remaining 15 seats are filled from nationwide party lists on a top-down basis and based on the proportion of the total vote each party received.

Greece uses a complex reinforced proportional representation electoral system which discourages splinter parties and makes a parliamentary majority possible even if the leading party falls short of a majority of the popular vote. Under the current electoral law, any single party must receive at least a 3% nationwide vote tally to elect members of parliament (the so-called "3% threshold"). The largest party is rewarded with a "sliding scale" bonus. It receives 20 extra seats once it reaches 25% of the vote, and then 1 extra seat for every 0.5%, until a maximum bonus of 50 seats (out of 300), ostensibly to ensure elections return viable governing majorities.

At various times throughout the years, the system has been changed, and parties sometimes fall short of the 151 seats required to have a majority, so they create coalitions. The law in its current form assists the first past the post party to achieve an absolute (151 parliamentary seats) majority, with substantially less than 50% of the vote. The electoral law can be changed by simple parliamentary majority, but a law so changed will not come into effect for two election cycles unless passed by a 2/3 majority in the Hellenic Parliament.

== Judicial branch ==
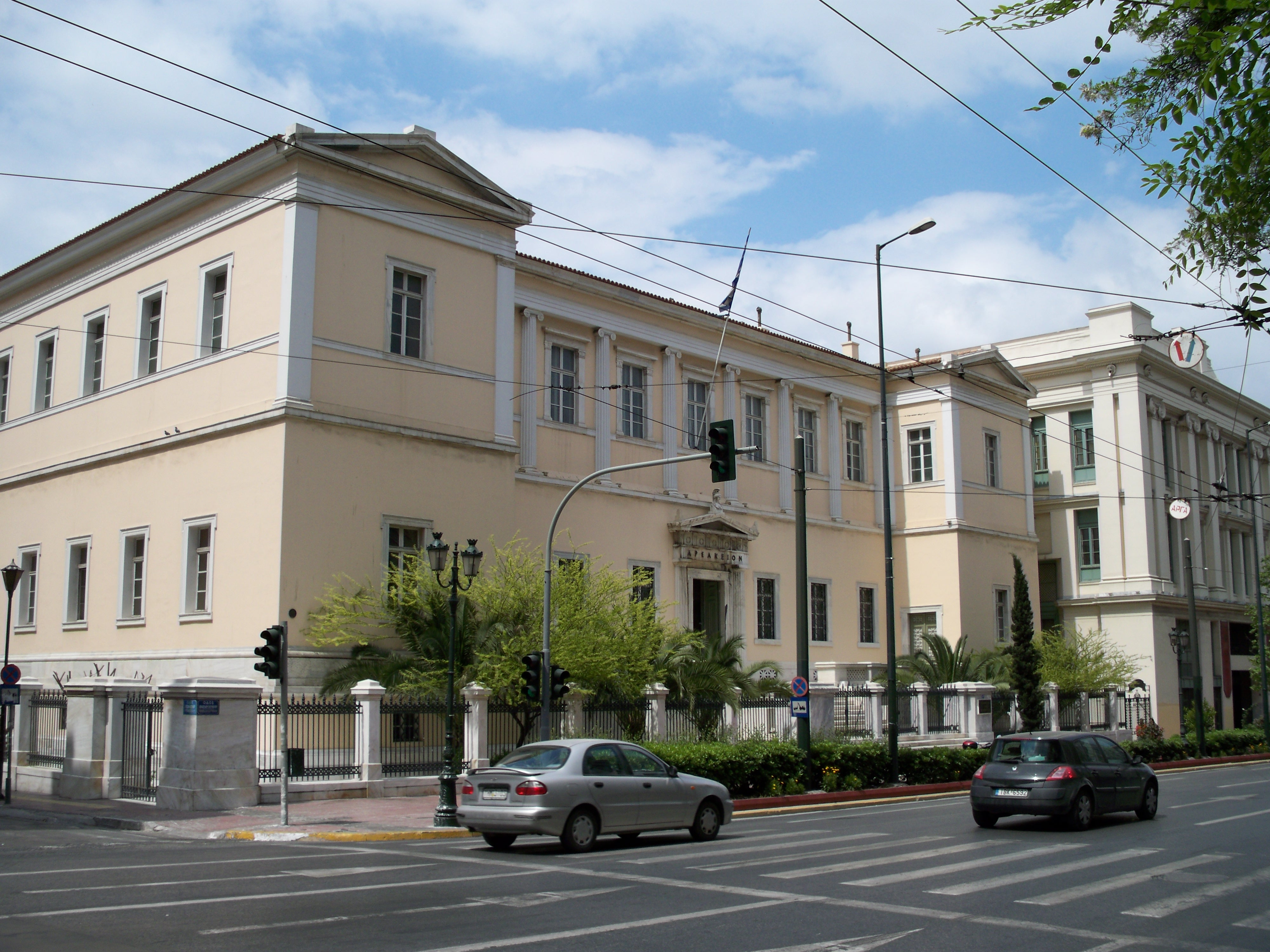
The building of the Arsakeion in Athens, where the Council of State is seated

In Greece the judicial branch is divided into civil, and administrative courts. Civil courts judge civil and penal cases, whereas administrative courts judge administrative cases, namely disputes between the citizens and the State.

The judicial system of Greece comprises three Supreme Courts: the Court of Cassation (Άρειος Πάγος), the Council of State (Συμβούλιο της Επικρατείας) and the Chamber of Accounts (Ελεγκτικό Συνέδριο). These high courts are composed of professional judges, graduates of the National School of Judges. The way the judges are gradually promoted, until they become members of the Supreme Courts, is defined by the Constitution and the existing laws. The presidents and the vice-presidents of the three Supreme Courts are chosen by the Cabinet of Greece among the serving members of each of the Supreme Courts.

The Court of Cassation is the supreme civil and penal court, whereas the Council of State is the supreme administrative court. The Chamber of Accounts has an exclusive jurisdiction over certain administrative areas (for example it judges disputes arising from the legislation regulating the pensions of civil servants) and its decisions are irrevocable. This means that they are not judged at second instance by the Council of State.

Sometimes, the Supreme Courts take contradictory decisions or they judge differently the constitutionality of a legal provision. These disputes are resolved by the Supreme Special Court, whose composition and jurisdiction is regulated by the Constitution (article 100). As its name reveals, this court is not permanent and it sits when a special case belonging to its jurisdiction arises. When the Supreme Special Court sits, it comprises eleven members: the presidents of the three Supreme Courts, four members of the Court of Cassation and four members of the Council of State.

When it judges the constitutionality of a law or resolves the disputes between Supreme Courts, its composition comprises two more members: two professors of the Law Schools of Greece. The Supreme Special Court is the only court which can declare an unconstitutional legal provision as "powerless" (something like "null and void"), while the three Supreme Courts can only declare an unconstitutional legal provision as "inapplicable" to that particular case. The Supreme Special Court is also the Supreme Electoral Court, judging pleas against the legality of the legislative elections.

== Administrative divisions ==
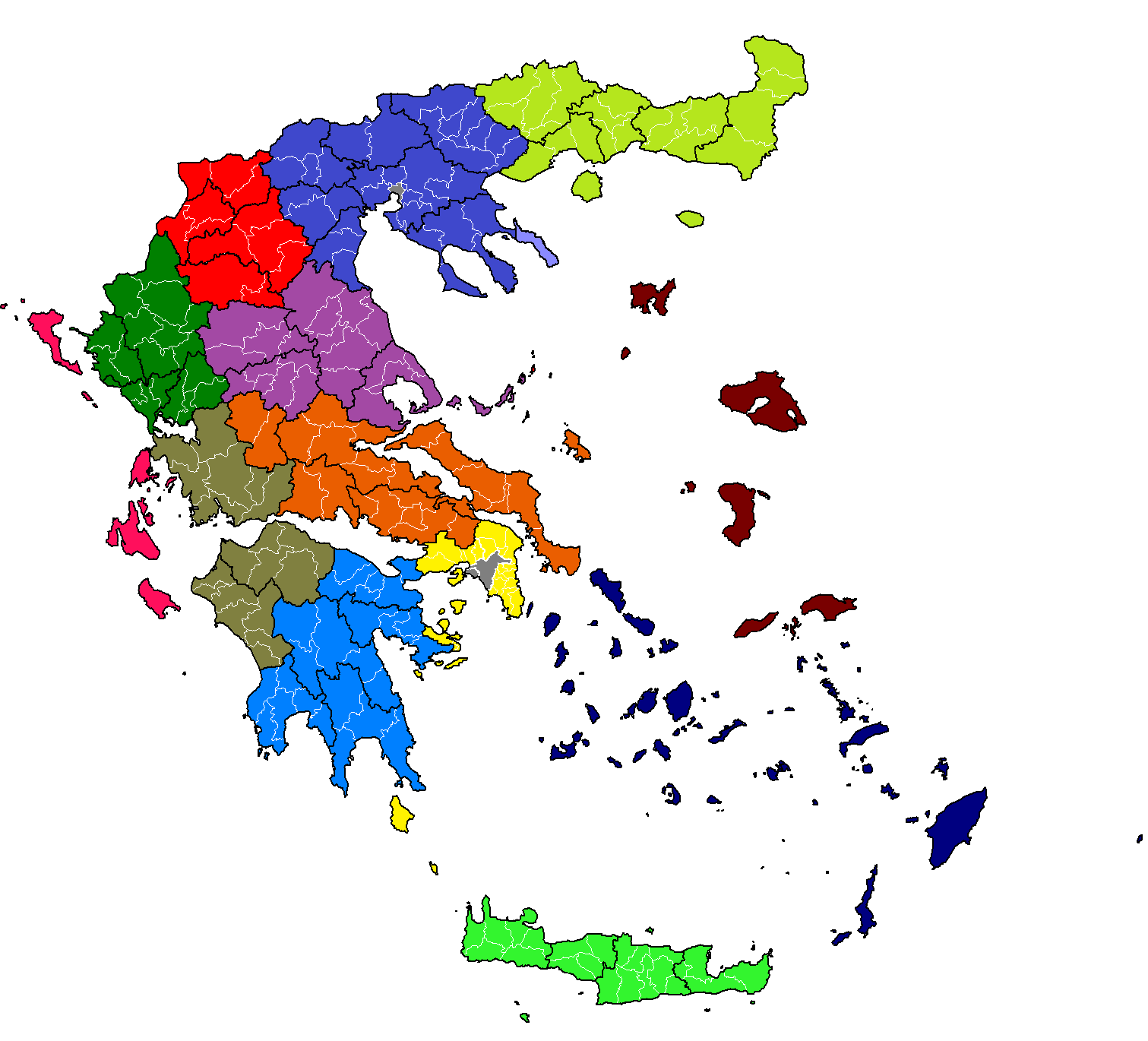
The administrative divisions of Greece, showing administrative regions and regional units

Greece is divided into 13 administrative regions which are further divided into 74 regional units. The 13 administrative regions (Περιφέρειες, Periféries) are each headed by a popularly elected governor (Περιφερειάρχης, Periferiárhis) and presided over by the popularly elected regional council (Περιφερειακό Συμβούλιο, Periferiakó Simvoúlio). Each of the 74 regional units (Περιφερειακές Ενότητες, Periferiakés Enóti̱tes) are headed by a vice governor (Αντιπεριφερειάρχης, Antiperiferiárhis), who is taken from the same political party as the elected governor. The 13 regions are mostly political and geographically. Greece is home to nine regions: Western Thrace, Macedonia, with the capital of Thessaloniki; Epirus; Central Greece; Peloponnese; the Ionian Islands; the Aegean islands; Crete; and Athens.

Greece's 74 regional units are divided into 325 municipalities (Δήμοι, Dhími) which are led by a popularly elected mayor (Δήμαρχος, Dhímarhos) and municipal council (Δημοτικό Συμβούλιο, Dhimotikó Simvoúlio). Each municipality is divided into small municipal units (Δημοτικές Ενότητες, Dhimotikés Enótites) which in turn contain municipal communities (relatively urban communities) and local communities (relatively rural communities). Municipal councils select community members to serve on more local town hall councils which focus on local needs in the municipality's communities and give local feedback to the municipal government.

Although municipalities and villages have elected officials, they often do not have an adequate independent revenue base and must depend on the central government budget for a large part of their financial needs. Consequently, they are subject to numerous central government controls. This also leads to extremely low municipal taxes (usually around 0.2% or less).

Greece also includes one autonomous region, the monastic community of the Holy Mountain, Mount Athos.

== Notable politicians of Greece ==
=== Former ===
- Evangelos Averoff
- Georgios Christakis-Zografos
- Epameinondas Deligiorgis
- Theodoros Deligiannis
- Ion Dragoumis
- Stephanos Dragoumis
- Dimitrios Gounaris
- Ilias Iliou
- Dimitrios Kallergis
- Konstantinos Kanaris
- Panagiotis Kanellopoulos
- Ioannis Kapodistrias
- Konstantinos Karamanlis
- Ioannis Kolettis
- Alexandros Koumoundouros
- Leonidas Kyrkos
- Grigoris Lambrakis
- Spyros Markezinis
- Alexandros Mavrokordatos
- Andreas Metaxas
- Ioannis Metaxas
- Konstantinos Mitsotakis
- Alexandros Panagoulis
- Alexandros Papagos
- Alexandros Papanastasiou
- Andreas Papandreou
- Georgios Papandreou
- Nikolaos Plastiras
- Georgios Rallis
- Alexandros Rizos Rangavis
- Ioannis Sfakianakis
- Themistoklis Sofoulis
- Konstantinos Stephanopoulos
- Georgios Theotokis
- Charilaos Trikoupis
- Spyridon Trikoupis
- Eleftherios Venizelos
- Sofoklis Venizelos
- Nikos Zachariadis
- Alexandros Zaimis

=== Current ===
- Dimitris Avramopoulos (former mayor of Athens)
- Dora Bakoyannis (former mayor of Athens)
- Kostas Bakoyannis (former mayor of Athens)
- Stavros Dimas (former European commissioner for the environment and secretary of the state)
- Maria Damanaki (former leader of SYN)
- Nikos Dendias (minister of national defence)
- Anna Diamantopoulou (former minister of education, lifelong learning and religious affairs)
- Pavlos Geroulanos (former minister of culture and tourism)
- Kostis Hatzidakis (deputy prime minister, minister of state)
- Kostas Karamanlis (former prime minister)
- Nikos Kotzias (former minister of foreign affairs)
- Dimitris Koutsoumpas (general secretary of Communist Party of Greece)
- Fotis Kouvelis (former leader of DIMAR)
- Stefanos Manos (former minister of finance)
- Kyriakos Mitsotakis (prime minister)
- Dimitrios Papadimoulis (vice-president of the European Parliament)
- George Papandreou (former prime minister and leader of Socialist International)
- Giannis Ragousis (former minister of the interior)
- Katerina Sakellaropoulou (former president of the Hellenic Republic)
- Antonis Samaras (former prime minister)
- Alexis Tsipras (former prime minister)
- Euclid Tsakalotos (former minister of finance)
- Stavros Theodorakis (former leader of To Potami)
- Yanis Varoufakis (former minister of finance, leader of MeRA25 )
- Kyriakos Velopoulos (leader of Greek Solution)
- Evangelos Venizelos (former minister of national defense)

== By topic ==
Lobbying and advocacy groups influence Greek politics.

=== Education ===
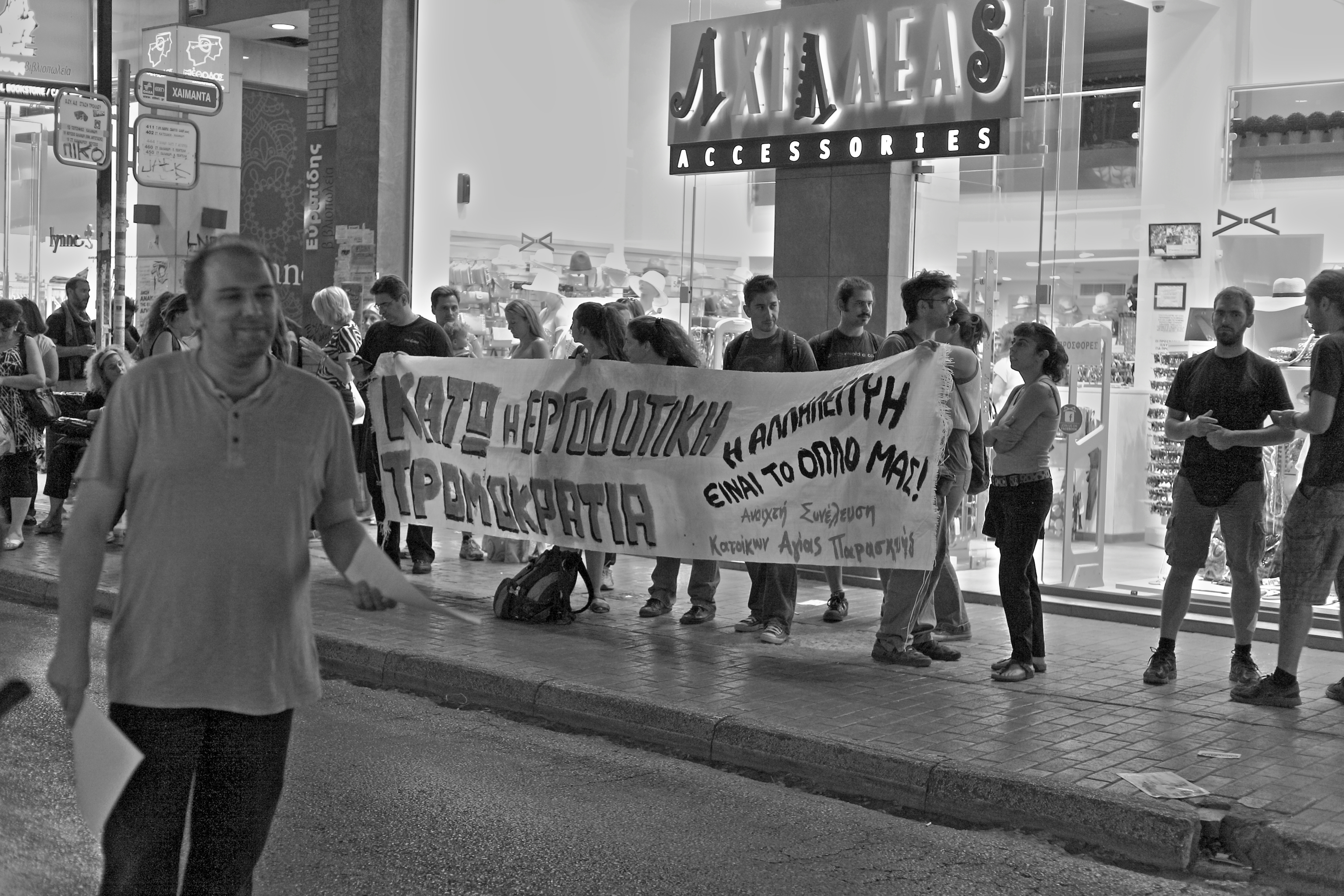
A working class political protest in Athens, Greece calling for the boycott of a local bookshop after, allegedly, an employee was fired for her political activism

Under the Greek constitution, education is the responsibility of the state. Most Greeks attend public primary and secondary schools. There are a few private schools, which must meet the standard curriculum of and are supervised by the Ministry of Education. The Ministry of Education oversees and directs every aspect of the public education process at all levels, including hiring all teachers and professors and producing all required textbooks.

=== Foreign relations ===
As one of the first Euro-Atlantic member states in the region of Southeast Europe, Greece enjoys a prominent geopolitical role, due to its political and geographical proximity to Europe, Asia, the Middle East, and Africa. Its main allies are France, United Kingdom, Italy, Bulgaria, United States, the other NATO countries and the European Union.

Greece also maintains strong diplomatic relations with Cyprus, Albania, Russia, Serbia, Armenia and Israel, while at the same time focuses at improving further the good relations with Egypt and the Arab World, Caucasus, India and China. As member of both the EU and the Union for the Mediterranean, Greece is a key player in the eastern Mediterranean region and has encouraged the collaboration between neighbors, as well as promoting the Energy Triangle, for gas exports to Europe. Greece also has the largest economy in the Balkans, where it is an important regional investor.

Prominent issues in Hellenic foreign policy include the claims in the Aegean Sea and Eastern Mediterranean by Turkey and the Turkish occupation of Cyprus.

==== Non-state owned universities ====
A recent issue concerning education in Greece is the institutionalisation of private universities. According to the constitution only state-run universities operate on the land. However, in recent years many foreign private universities have established branches in Greece, offering bachelor's level degrees, thus creating a legal contradiction between the Greek constitution and the EU laws allowing foreign companies to operate anywhere in the Union.

At the outset of 2006, prime minister Kostas Karamanlis announced the initiative of his government for a new amendment of the Constitution. According to his assertion one of the main issues of this amendment (the second within less than 10 years) is going to be the creation of "non-state owned" universities.

=== Illegal immigration ===
Greece has problems with illegal immigration, especially from or via Turkey. Greek authorities believe that 90% of illegal immigrants in the EU enter through Greece, many fleeing because of unrest and poverty in the Middle East and Africa.

Several European courts have held that Greece is not complying with minimum standards of treatment for asylum seekers, so that illegal migrants who reach other countries cannot be sent back to Greece.

Numerous solutions have been proposed by the Greek government such as building a fence on the Turkish border and setting up detention camps.

=== Judicial system ===
One of the main problems of the system is the long-time process needed, even for a simple case, something that negatively impacts investment, entrepreneurship, social relations, corporate governance, and public governance. Also corruption cases have appeared during the last years, such as the Paradikastiko organization scandal.

Manipulation of the judicial system and its decisions by each government, is another common phenomenon which violates the independency of the system.

==== Prisons ====
There are three prison types in Greece: general, special, and therapeutic prisons. General prisons include three different types of inmates: type A, type B, and type C. Special prisons include rural units, juvenile institutions, and semi-liberty centers. One example of a special prison would be an agricultural prison. The last type is a therapeutic prison, which includes hospitals and rehab centers for inmates.

Within these centers the percentage of female prisoners is 5.5%, which amounts to around 538 prisoners. The percentage of juveniles in Greek prison is 2.9%. Greece's occupancy rate in prisons is 99%, which means that its prisons are near full capacity. With some exceptions occupancy exceeds 100%, and in some establishments, it reaches, or surpasses, 300%. Because of this the Greek Justice Ministry and the European Council want to improve Greek prison conditions. These improvements include training for guards, improving of medical facilities, and better treatment of prisoners. These selected improvements are three human rights that the Greek correctional system would like to tackle.

=== Media ===
The Greek media, collectively, is a very influential institution – usually aggressive and sensationalist. As with many countries, most of the media are owned by businesses with commercial interests in other sectors of the economy. There are often accusations of newspapers, magazines, and radio and television channels being used to promote their commercial enterprises as well as to seek political influence.

In 1994, the Ministry of Press and Media was established to deal with media and communication issues. ERT S.A., a public corporation supervised by the Minister of Press, operates three national television channels and five national radio channels. The Minister of Press also serves as the primary government spokesperson.

The secretary general of press and information prepares the semi-official Athens News Agency (ANA) Bulletin. Along with AP and Reuters, this is a primary source of information for the Greek press. The Ministry of Press and Information also issues the semi-official Macedonian News Agency (MPE) Bulletin, which is distributed throughout the Balkan region. For international news, CNN is a particular influence in the Greek market; the major television channels often use it as a source. State and private television stations also use Eurovision and Visnews as sources. While few papers and stations have overseas correspondents, those few correspondents abroad can be very influential.

In 1988, a new law provided the legal framework for the establishment of private radio stations and, in 1989, private television stations. According to the law, supervision of radio and television is exercised by the National Radio and Television Council. In practice, however, official licensing has been delayed for many years. Because of this, there has been a proliferation of private radio and television stations, as well as European satellite channels, including Euronews. More than 1,000 radio stations were operating before March 2002, when the government implemented plans to reallocate television frequencies and issue licenses as authorized by the 1993 Media Law, effectively reducing this number.

==== Media freedom ====
In 2011, the government proposed new measures that will restrict the freedom of speech in the internet. According to some proposals, every individual who would like to use free platforms, such like Blogspot or WordPress.com will be forced to get officially registered in the courts, as due to tough austerity measures web sites that criticize the government and the political system in general have been multiplied.

Press freedom sharply eroded in Greece during the Greek government-debt crisis, passing from the 35th place in 2009 in Reporters Without Borders Press Freedom Index to the 99th place in 2014, well below all Western Balkans countries as well as states with repressive media policies such as Gabon, Kuwait or Liberia. Greece is today the EU member state "where journalism and the media face their most acute crisis". In 2022, Greece ranked 27th in the EU and 108 out of 180 countries according to Reporters Without Borders.

===== Petsas's List =====
Cabinet of Kyriakos Mitsotakis allocated €19,832,132.94 to media and press. After pressure from the opposition, Stylianos Petsas, then government representative, published the list. Less than 1% of the 20 million euros of the campaign was given to the opposition press. According to OGG 475BB/27-10-2020, a Second "Petsas's List" was announced, this time exclusively on nationwide free-to-air stations. This was followed by the vaccination campaign, amounting to 18,500,000 euros and the Plevris List with total amounts of 4,960,000 euros.

=== Military service ===
Twelve months for all males of 18 years of age; Compulsory with fines and imprisonment if denied, but neither fine nor imprisonment has been imposed since 1994, where the last warrant against a draft-dodger was issued. Members of families with three children serve a reduced time of six months. Military service can also be substituted with a longer public service, which by the standards of Amnesty International, ought to be considered punitive as it is twice as long as the regular tour of duty.

Limited steps have been taken to turn the Greek military into a semi-professional army in the last years, leading to the gradual reduction of the service from 18 to 12 to 9 months and the inclusion of a greater number of professional military personnel in most vertices of the force. Recent developments, though, within the anti-conscription movement in Greece, such as the high death rate from suicides during service and work-related accidents, such as the Manitsa incident, combined with a high rate of draft-dodging, have advanced the idea that mandatory conscription should be abolished and an all-professional/all-volunteer army should be put in place.

==== Military spending ====
Greece directs approximately 1.7% of its GDP to military expenditures, the 7th highest percentage in Europe. In absolute numbers the Greek military budget ranked 28th in the world in 2005. By the same measure, Greek military budget ranked 6th in the Mediterranean basin (behind France, Italy, Turkey, Israel and Spain) and 2nd (behind Turkey) in its immediate vicinity, the Balkans. Greek arms purchasing is among the highest in the world: Greece ranked 3rd in the world in 2004.

These figures are explained in the light of the arms race between Greece and Turkey with key issues being the Cyprus dispute and disagreement over sovereignty of certain islets of the Aegean. For more information see Greco-Turkish relations. Conversely, the foreign relations of Greece as well as many internal policy decisions are largely affected by its arms purchases. The United States, being the major arms seller to Greece has been known to actively intervene in military spending decisions made by the Greek government. The US has at times actively stepped in to help avoid large scale crisis, as in the case of the Imia-Kardak crisis.

The reduction of military spending has long been an issue in Greek politics. The former prime minister, Kostas Karamanlis had proposed a reduction to military spending through a "Defence Eurozone", referring to the European Security and Defence Policy. The previous PASOK administration, also planned on reducing military spending prior to its failure to be re-elected in 2004, while PASOK politicians usually refer to money saved from reducing military spending as a "peace dividend" ("μέρισμα ειρήνης").

Some of the parties on the left, such as the Communist Party of Greece and Synaspismos, have been vocal in condemning military spending. Regarding the purchase of 30 F-16 and 333 Leopard tanks in 2005, both parties criticized the New Democracy administration for spending money on weapons while doing nothing to relieve the lower classes and said that high military spending "does not correspond to the real needs of the country but is carried out according to NATO planning and to serve weapon manufacturers and the countries that host them".

=== Church-state relations ===
The Greek Orthodox Church is under the protection of the State, which pays the clergy's salaries, and Orthodox Christianity is the "'prevailing" religion of Greece according to the Constitution. The Greek Orthodox Church is self-governing but under the spiritual guidance of the Ecumenical Patriarch in Constantinople. Freedom of religious beliefs is guaranteed by the Constitution, but "proselytism" is officially illegal. According to the most recent Eurostat "Eurobarometer" poll, in 2005, 81% of Greek citizens responded that "they believe there is a God", whereas 16% answered that "they believe there is some sort of spirit or life force" and only 3% that "they do not believe there is a God, spirit, nor life force". This would make Greece one of the most religious countries in the European Union of 25 members, after Malta, Romania and Cyprus.

The Muslim minority, concentrated in Thrace, was given legal status by provisions of the Treaty of Lausanne (1923) and is Greece's only officially recognized religious minority. There are small Roman Catholic communities on some of the Cyclades and the Ionian Islands, remnants of the long Venetian rule over the islands. The recent influx of (mostly illegal) immigrants from Eastern Europe and the Third World has an expectedly varied multi-religious profile (Roman Catholic, Muslim, Hindu etc.).

During the 2001 constitutional amendment, complete separation of church and state was proposed, but the two major parties, ND and PASOK, decided not to open this controversial matter, which clashes with both the population and the clergy. For example, numerous protests occurred over the removal of the Religious Denomination entry from the National ID card in 2000.

== Since 2015 ==
More left-wing Syriza overtook PASOK as the main party of the centre-left.Alexis Tsipras led Syriza to victory in the general election held on 25 January 2015, falling short of an outright majority in Parliament by just two seats. Syriza gained support by opposing the austerity policy that had affected Greeks since the beginning of the Greek government-debt crisis. The following morning, Tsipras reached an agreement with Independent Greeks party to form a coalition, and he was sworn in as Prime Minister of Greece. Tsipras called snap elections in August 2015, resigning from his post, which led to a month-long caretaker administration headed by judge Vassiliki Thanou-Christophilou, Greece's first female prime minister. In the September 2015 general election, Alexis Tsipras led Syriza to another victory, winning 145 out of 300 seats and re-forming the coalition with the Independent Greeks. However, he was defeated in the July 2019 general election by Kyriakos Mitsotakis who leads New Democracy. On 7 July 2019, Kyriakos Mitsotakis was sworn in as the new prime minister of Greece. He formed a centre-right government after the landslide victory of his New Democracy party.

In March 2020, Greece's parliament elected a non-partisan candidate, Ekaterini Sakellaropoulou, as the first female President of Greece. In June 2023, conservative New Democracy party won the legislative election, meaning another four-year term as prime minister for Kyriakos Mitsotakis.

According to the V-Dem Democracy indices Greece was 2023 the 37th most electoral democratic country in the world.

On February 7, Members of the European Parliament approved a critical resolution about the "worrying" decline of the rule of law in Greece, pointing the finger at Prime Minister Kyriakos Mitsotakis. The non-binding text details a string of concerns about the current state of Greek democracy, including harassment of journalists, privacy violations, wiretapping of political opponents, excessive use of police force, conflicts of interests, alleged corruption, smear campaigns against civil society and the "systematic" pushbacks of migrants. Thus, Greece is the lowest-ranking EU country in the World Press Freedom Index curated by Reporters Without Borders (RSF), with an abysmal score of 55.2 points, considerably worse than Hungary (62.96), Bulgaria (62.98) and Poland (67.66). One of the reasons behind the ranking is the 2022 scandal known as Predatorgate, where cabinet members, political opponents and journalists were subject to prolonged surveillance. The scandal exposed Mitsotakis, who personally controls the Greek National Intelligence Service, to international censure but failed to dampen his electoral standing.
