= Presidential Departments (Greece) =

Departments underneath the President of Greece

The President of the Hellenic Republic has a number of minor departments underneath them in order to help them exercise their duties. Although the office of President is largely a ceremonial one, and powers are only theoretically meant to be used in the event of a national emergency (where the safety of the Republic itself is in danger), these departments help the President keep track of the day-to-day running of Government (which is exercised by the Prime Minister. There are 7 major offices of the President and 4 minor offices.

== Major Offices ==
Secretary General
The Secretary General oversees all the departments of the Presidency of the Republic and supervises all the offices attached to it.

President's Office
This office is responsible for aiding the President of the Republic in the carrying out of their duties, for handling their personal and official correspondence and for arranging their personal meetings. This office also has the sub-offices of The Press and Public relations departments under its control.

Legal Department
The Legal Department is responsible for reviewing and making recommendations about all matters relating to the exercise of the powers given to the President of the Republic by the Constitution, for the issuing of laws, acts of legislative content, regulatory or individual decrees, for the granting of pardons, the reduction or commuting of sentences which have been imposed by the courts.

Diplomatic Office
The Diplomatic Office is responsible for following all matters connected with international relations, for keeping the President of the Republic briefed on such matters and for preparing Presidential visits abroad. This office also organizes receptions and deals with all matters of protocol related to the President's meetings with Heads of foreign countries and other dignitaries.

Military Office
The Military Office makes sure the President is fully briefed on all Military matters pertaining to things such as national security and arms procurement (as well as the annual budget), it is headed by a Major of the Hellenic Army.

Administrative Office
The Office of Administrative Affairs is responsible for all matters relating to the staff of the Presidency, the coordination and supervision of administrative issues connected with the Presidency of the Republic, the observance of the general protocol as well as for the supervision of the buildings and facilities of the Presidency.

Financial Affairs Office
The Financial Affairs Office is responsible for matters relating to the drawing up of the budget, the financial management, the payment of staff salaries, procurements and the management and distribution of materials.

== Minor Offices ==
- Office of Security.
- Office of Postal services.
- Office of Financial Control.
- Telecommunications Office.
