= Siemens Greek bribery scandal =

Corruption and bribery scandal in Greece

The Siemens bribery scandal in Greece is a corruption and bribery scandal in Greece over deals between Siemens and Greek government officials during the 2004 Summer Olympic Games in Athens, Greece regarding security systems and purchases by OTE in the 1990s.

Although there is no conclusive evidence, the scandal has created a serious change in the attitudes of the Greek public, most notably a dissatisfaction with both main political parties in Greece, New Democracy and Panhellenic Socialist Movement (PASOK) and created a "hole of authority" leading to a vicious circle of political instability.

It has been claimed that the bribes may have been up to 100 million euros. These bribes were allegedly given to win state contracts.

It has been indicated that a few PASOK members acting as individuals may have been involved, although this is simply a claim and nothing has been proven, or at least any evidence has come to light.

A Greek prosecutor, after two years of investigations, filed charges on 1 July 2008 for money laundering and bribery. It has been claimed that it is certain Siemens divisions that were involved in the transactions.

On 30 May 2008, a prosecutor's investigation took place at the offices of Kyriakos Mitsotakis for donations and grants by Siemens.

In 2009, the central figure of the scandal, ex-Siemens chief executive in Greece Michalis Christoforakos, left for Germany to avoid arrest, in obscure conditions involving the foreign minister Dora Bakogianni.

Tasos Mantelis, former Minister for Transport and Communications during the PASOK administration in 1998, admitted in May 2010 to a parliamentary investigation committee that the sum of 200,000 German marks was deposited in 1998 in a Swiss bank account from Siemens during his administration, allegedly for funding his election campaign. A further deposit of 250,000 German marks was made into the same bank account in 2000, which Mantelis claims is from an unknown source.

As of August 2012, the Greek government had signed a settlement with Siemens worth 330 million euros.

== Trials ==
The trial of the persons accused of involvement in the scandal was scheduled to begin on February 24, 2017. A total of 64 individuals are accused, both Greek and German nationals. The central figure of the scandal, however, ex-Siemens chief executive in Greece Michalis Christoforakos, against whom European arrest warrants are pending, will likely be absent, as Germany refuses his extradition to this day. Initially arrested in Germany in 2009, the accusations against him by German courts have been dropped. Greece has been demanding his extradition since 2009, and considers him a fugitive from justice. Christoforakos, during his trial in Germany, testified to having bribed (2%) both political parties, ND and PASOK (through Geitonas, partner of Kostas Simitis, and Vartholomeos).

In July 2017, Mantelis was found guilty by Greek courts of bribery and money laundering, receiving an eight-year suspended sentence.

In October 2017, prosecutor Georgios Voulgaris reiterated the warrant to bring Christoforakos (including five German nationals and ex-Siemens top figures) to trial, making it the third time Greek Justice made this demand.

== See also ==
- Siemens scandal; 1914 scandal in Japan
- Corruption in Greece
