= Hot Doc =

Greek magazine

- Cover of Hot Doc issue 13
- Editor: Kostas Vaxevanis
- Categories: Politics, current affairs
- Frequency: Fortnightly
- Publisher: Kostas Vaxevanis
- First issue: 2012
- Company: To Kouti tis Pandoras AEBE
- Country: Greece
- Language: Greek
- Website: www.hotdoc.gr
- ISSN: 2241-2433

Hot Doc is a Greek news magazine, launched in April 2012 by its owner and editor Kostas Vaxevanis. It is issued every fifteen days.

In October 2012, it published a special issue containing a list of names claimed to be the contents of the Lagarde list. On 28 October 2012, Vaxevanis was arrested in relation to its publication. Vaxevanis' trial began on 1 November and ended the same day with an acquittal.

Since November 2016, Hot Doc has been sold as a supplement of the Documento newspaper, also owned by Vaxevanis.
