= Kostas Vaxevanis =

Greek journalist (bοrn 1966)

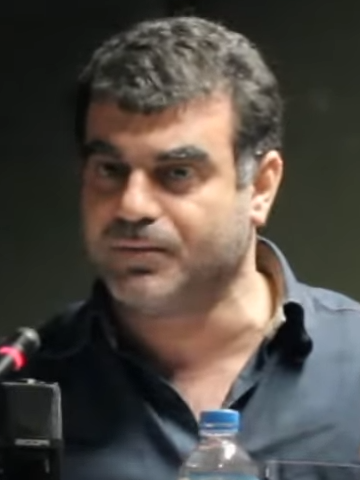
Vaxevanis in 2023.

Kostas Vaxevanis (Greek: Κώστας Βαξεβάνης; born 6 May 1966) is a Greek journalist. He is the owner and editor of the magazine Hot Doc and newspaper Documento.

Born in 1966 in Agia Paraskevi, Lesbos, Vaxevanis began his journalistic career in Rizospastis in 1988. He later worked with other newspapers, including Eleftherotypia, Kathimerini, To Pontiki and To Vima.

In 1991, he began reporting from war zones, including Bosnia, the Persian Gulf, Palestine, Albania and Kosovo, for the television channels NET and MEGA.

== Hot Doc ==
In April 2012, Vaxevanis began publication of the fortnightly magazine Hot Doc.

On 28 October 2012, he was arrested over the magazine's publication of a document claimed to be the Lagarde list, a list of 1,991 names of Greek customers with accounts at the Swiss branch of HSBC, suggesting that they could be tax evaders. He was charged with "interfering with sensitive personal data". The published list had names of customers of the Geneva branch of HSBC and, according to the magazine, "matched a list of 2,059 people" on the Lagarde list. Vaxevanis was released from Athens police headquarters a few hours after his arrest. On leaving the building, he told a reporter: "The prosecutor's office wants to protect tax evaders. I'm just doing my duty. Instead of arresting the tax evaders and the ministers who had the list in their hands, they're trying to arrest the truth and freedom of the press."

On 29 October, he was given a "fast-track trial date" by prosecutors. Government critics contrasted the speed of the case against Vaxevanis with the slow arrest of Golden Dawn MP Ilias Kasidiaris and the government's slow investigation of the Lagarde list itself. Following his arrest, Vaxevanis wrote an article for the British newspaper The Guardian describing his view of the circumstances behind the publication of the list. The New York Times condemned the prosecution in an op-ed titled "Greece Arrests the Messenger", stating, "Greece’s elected leaders need to pay more attention to investigating possible financial crimes and less to prosecuting journalists."

Vaxevanis' trial began on 1 November and ended the same day with an acquittal. Leaving the courtroom, he quoted George Orwell to supporters: "Journalism is printing what someone else does not want printed. The rest is public relations." On 16 November, the courts indicated that he may face retrial. In 2013, a prosecutor overturned the acquittal and ordered Vaxevanis to undergo a new trial. The retrial ended in November 2013 with another acquittal.

In October 2019, he accused Prime Minister Kyriakos Mitsotakis of trying to economically strangle Documento because of its reporting on Mitsotakis' finances, his personal loans for Kyrix Chanion newspaper, and his family's offshore companies. David Sassoli, president of the European Parliament, stated in a letter to the journalist that "there is worry about the situation of the Press in Greece and that they observe his case".

The media of Vaxevanis were excluded by the Greek government regarding the state financial aid to various Greek media for the promotion against the COVID-19 pandemic ("Petsas list").

== 2022 Public Surveillance Crisis ==
On November 6, 2022, Vaxevanis' Documento published detailed research on the 2022 Surveillance Crisis (wiretapping scandal).According to the journal, several important members of the New Democracy government (including Minister of Foreign Policy Nikos Dendias and Minister of Development and Investment Adonis Georgiadis), ex-prime minister Antonis Samaras, and prolific investigative journalist and publisher Alexis Papahelas were illegally surveilled by the Israeli-made Predator spyware. In total, thirty-three people were reported to be on the surveillance list. Several international news agencies, including the Daily Mail, picked up the topic. On November 7, Vaxevanis asked to testify on the subject. The Greek government has not denied the allegations.

== Dispute with Alexis Tsipras ==
During the period 2025–2026, a political and personal dispute developed between Vaxevanis and former Prime Minister of Greece, Alexis Tsipras. The dispute intensified in November 2025, following the publication by the newspaper Documento of several excerpts from Tsipras's forthcoming book, titled as Ithaki. The publishing house Gutenberg took legal action, seeking the withdrawal of the published excerpts and a ban on any further publication. The Greek court granted the request through an interim order. Vaxevanis publicly criticized the move, describing it as a "form of prior censorship." Vaxevanis also stated that he has regretted his previous political support provided to the former prime minister. His dispute with Tsipras continued into 2026, with Vaxevanis repeatedly referring to his political differences with Alexis Tsipras and stating that he would continue to criticize Tsipras's political choices.

== Awards ==
- 2013: VII Julio A. Parrado Journalism Award
- 2013: Index on Censorship Journalism Award

== See also ==
- Media of Greece
