= Lagarde list =

List of tax evaders at HSBC Geneva

The Lagarde list is a spreadsheet containing roughly 2,000 potential tax evaders with undeclared accounts at Swiss HSBC bank's Geneva branch. It is named after former French finance minister Christine Lagarde, who in October 2010 passed it on to Greek officials to help them crack down on tax evasion. However, it was only two years later the list became known to a wider public, when Greek journalist Kostas Vaxevanis published it in his magazine Hot Doc, protesting against the Greek government's failure to launch an investigation.

The Lagarde list is only a subset of a much larger data set, known as the Falciani list, with around 130,000 names of HSBC customers captured by the French police. It is not to be confused with another list from the Bank of Greece of 54,000 people who took €22 billion out of the country, and which has yet to be investigated.

== History ==
=== The Falciani list ===
In 2006 and 2007 a computer technician for HSBC bank's Geneva branch, Hervé Falciani, allegedly stole data from his employer, containing the names of customers from several EU countries, and attempted to sell them to several governments.

In January 2009 the police raided the French home of Falciani and found computer files on 130,000 potential tax evaders (24,000 from across Europe) and began investigating them. The French government then passed the information on to selected European governments such as the United Kingdom to help them crack down on tax evasion.

=== Delivery to Greek authorities ===
In the early summer of 2010, the French intelligence service DGSE informed the (then) head of Greece's National Intelligence Agency that many of those named in the Falciani dossier were Greek. and that French authorities were prepared to deliver a list containing names of wealthy Greek depositors in Swiss banks to help the Greek government to crack down on tax evaders. The head of Greek intelligence then briefed former Finance Minister for the George Papandreou government, Giorgos Papakonstantinou, who accepted this information in a meeting with then French finance minister Christine Lagarde, on the condition that it remain discreet.

In October 2010, Lagarde sent a list of 1,991 names to Papakonstantinou through diplomatic channels in the form of an unlabelled CD containing spreadsheets for the roughly 2,000 accounts now known in Greece as the "Lagarde list". Papakonstantinou later told a parliamentary inquiry that he "handed all the files to the new head of the tax police" - the Greece's Financial and Economic Crime Unit (SDOE) - "and asked him to proceed with a full investigation". However, the tax authorities chose not to proceed and Papakonstantinou left office in mid-2011, and the CD went missing. Papakonstantinou's successor, Evangelos Venizelos, afterwards the head of the PASOK Socialists, produced a copy on a memory stick and began a limited investigation as to whether any of those listed had evaded taxes. The investigation only looked at around ten politicians and no legal action was taken. It was only when then new Finance Minister Yannis Stournaras asked Paris for another copy, that Venizelos supposedly remembered the USB stick in the drawer of his secretary. Comparison of the list newly delivered from Paris with the one supplied by Venizelos from the Greek ministry of finance revealed that in the latter one three names were missing, all relatives of Papakonstantinou. This led to Papakonstantinous' expulsion from the PASOK political party. In 2015, Papakonstantinou received a suspended misdemeanour conviction for the tampering. Yet he has consistently denied all charges.

Earlier, in October 2012, the former defence ministry official Yiannis Sbokos was arrested on corruption charges, regarding a defence ministry bribery and money-laundering scandal. The next day Leonidas Tzanis, a former deputy interior minister (1999-2001), was found dead in the basement of his home, where he had apparently hanged himself. Vlassis Kambouroglou, another businessman (and former managing director of Drumilan International, a company involved in the sale of a Russian-made TOR-M1 missile system to Greece) accused of involvement in the scandal was found dead in a Jakarta hotel room. He was the second high-ranking Greek figure to die in mysterious circumstances within five days. Both Tzanis and Kambouroglou were on the Lagarde List.

=== Publication ===
On 28 October 2012, Greek reporter and editor Kostas Vaxevanis claimed to be in possession of the list and published 2,056 names from it in his magazine Hot Doc. The next day he was arrested for breaching privacy laws, a crime with a possible sentence of up to two years in prison. Three days later, Vaxevanis was tried and found not guilty.

=== Delivery to Danish authorities ===
In Denmark a scandal started unfolding after Politiken reported on 8 February 2015 that the Danish tax authorities in 2010 received a list of 314 Danes with deposits of 4.8 billion kroner in HSBC, money that was very likely not declared in Denmark, and that nevertheless the tax declarations of these wealthy Danes have not been investigated.
