= 2004 Greek financial audit =

The 2004 Greek financial audit was a 2004 investigation into the true extent of Greece's public finances. It examined government revenue, spending and the level of borrowing, ahead of the Greek government-debt crisis.

== Background ==
Within the European Union, entry into the Eurozone depends on the applicant nation meeting certain economic criteria. Measures such as budget deficits and public debt levels are assessed, as well as the inflation situation and the stability of the national currency exchange rate of a European Union member state. Requirements include a budget deficit below 3% of gross domestic product (GDP), and debt below 60% of GDP, or if above, declining.

Up until 1994, Greece recorded very high deficits, for some years above 10% of GDP. During the late nineties, according to the figures submitted by the Greek government to the European Union, Greece's high budget deficits were significantly lowered. In 2000, given a deficit below 3% of GDP in 1999, Greece was accepted as the 12th member of the European monetary union.

=== Eurostat refusal to validate Greek figures ===
In March 2002, Eurostat refused to validate data transmitted by the Greek government. In reaction, the NSSG (National Statistical Service of Greece) revised the debt level by several percentage points. In September 2002, Eurostat again refused to validate the data. The debt was revised upwards once again, and the government balance, which the Greek government had presented as a surplus, became a deficit.

In March 2004, Eurostat refused again to validate the Greek numbers. That was shortly before Greek elections, and a new government by New Democracy was inaugurated.

After the March 7 elections, the new government said that it would start an objective financial audit of the government accounts. George Papandreou, of Panhellenic Socialist Movement (PASOK), the main opposition at that time, and the other two smaller parties initially agreed with the need for an audit. The agreement lasted a very short time, and outside auditing firms and the central bank were not asked to carry out such an audit.

== New government audit ==
Instead, the government produced new estimates while it investigated the years 1997 to 2003, and the resulting data was given to Eurostat, which then went on and published a report. The requirement that the 1999 budget deficit should have been below 3% of GDP was one of the key criteria for Eurozone entry. Its revision to 3.07%, according to Eurostat (AMECO), led to a controversy about Greece's admission.

In the 2005 OECD report for Greece (p. 47) it was clearly stated that "the impact of new accounting rules on the fiscal figures for the years 1997 to 1999 ranged from 0.7 to 1 percentage point of GDP; this retroactive change of methodology was responsible for the revised deficit exceeding 3% in 1999, the year of EMU membership qualification". The above has led the Greek minister of finance to clarify that the 1999 budget deficit was below the prescribed 3% limit when it was calculated with the ESA79 methodology in force at the time of Greece's application. Since the remaining criteria had also been met, Greece was properly accepted into the Eurozone. ESA79 was also the methodology employed to calculate the deficits of all other Eurozone members at the time of their applications.

The original accounting practice for military expenses was later restored in line with Eurostat recommendations, theoretically lowering even the ESA95-calculated 1999 Greek budget deficit to below 3% (an official Eurostat calculation is still pending for 1999).

An error frequently made in press reports is the confusion of the discussion regarding Greece's Eurozone entry with the controversy regarding usage of derivatives’ deals with US banks by Greece and other Eurozone countries to hide their reported budget deficits. A currency swap arranged with Goldman Sachs allowed Greece to 'hide' 2.8 billion euros of debt, but that affected deficit values after 2001 (when Greece had already been admitted into the Eurozone) and is not related to Greece's Eurozone entry.

=== Implications ===
Several arguments have been expressed about the implications of the audit. Some commentators talked about data falsification. Others held a completely different viewpoint. "Irregularities" (the word falsification never officially used) in deficit reporting were also revealed for other Eurozone members, most notably Italy and Portugal, with significant revisions imposed. Also, there were arguments about massive "creative accounting" employed by many states in order to meet the deficit criterion for entry into the Eurozone.

Even the practice of one-off measures by so many states has been criticised since in several cases their deficits rose back over 3% soon after the reference year, however larger economies such as Germany and France seem to defy the rules for years. Last but not least, changes in accounting method often seriously affected the deficit numbers (Spain and Portugal had, like Greece, marginally exceeded 3% in their reference year for entry, when their deficit was revised according to ESA95). It was argued that New Democracy government simply miscalculated the consequences of its actions, which brought a strong reaction by Eurostat, stronger than that for other violators.

== Public finance consequences ==
As a result of the financial audit, Greece fell in the list of the loan creditability and paid more interest on its loans compared with other EU countries. EU Commission warned Greece about future problems if Greece, now with the new data, does not comply with the Eurozone requirements.

== Domestic political consequences ==
New Democracy's government accused PASOK, and Costas Simitis, the prime minister and president of PASOK at that time, of having falsified Greece's macroeconomic statistics, on the basis of which the European institutions accepted Greece to join the Eurozone. All the opposition parties accused New Democracy's government of making a false audit.

PASOK said that it never falsified any data, and that New Democracy's government just changed the way costs (mostly military expenses) were accounted for through the years and some other accounting techniques, and the way PASOK used to do it was known to the Eurostat, which never opposed it.

Costas Simitis wrote in the Financial Times that Greece's deficit revision damaged the EU: "The Commission must design an auditing system that is the same for all EU countries and guarantees objectivity and impartiality, while ruling out domestic political interference". Some days later, the same newspaper published a Letter to the Editor by the Director General of Eurostat acknowledged the need for monitoring and review of government accounts independent of political cycles, outlining the changes made but taking issue with the portrayal of the Greek account revisions.

In March 2006, Eurostat made changes to the system of defense expenditure calculation, which seemed to legitimize some of the practices of the previous Costas Simitis government of PASOK. This caused criticism of the Financial Audit of 2004 and the New Democracy government by PASOK and parts of the press. New Democracy responded that the defense expenditures covered by the 2006 changes constituted only a small part of much more substantial expenditures that were fraudulently concealed by the previous PASOK government.

== See also ==
- Greek government-debt crisis
- Fakelaki
- Greek financial audits 2009–2010
- Euro area crisis
