= Greek financial audits 2009–2010 =

Audits of Greece's public finances during the period 2009–2010 were undertaken by the EU authorities. Since joining the Euro zone, Greece's public finances markedly deviated from the debt and deficit limits set by Stability and Growth Pact.

Against this backdrop, a 2004 external audit exposed creative accounting practices understating the problem, putting the EU authorities on alert thereafter. In 2009, the Greek government-debt crisis developed, and the EU authorities suspected again a lack of credibility in its book keeping, hence the audits.

This caused political and financial market turmoil. For instance, it reignited a controversy about Greece's off-market swaps contracted with Goldman Sachs in 2001. The accounts for the period 2006–2009, including debt and deficits levels, were regularized. The lasting effects were institutional changes in Greece and at the EU level in the area of fiscal data. There remains, nonetheless, an ongoing controversy about methodological issues that affected the extent of revisions.

== Inside the reports ==
As part of an excessive deficit procedure (EDP), the Greek authorities submitted to Eurostat, in October 2009, unusually high upward revisions of the deficit and debt data for the period 2005–2008. ECOFIN commissioned an audit, known as an 'EDP methodological visit'. It began in November 2009, and its results were published in a report dated 8 January 2010.

According to this report, Eurostat could not validate Greece's fiscal data, exposing Greece's sub par statistical ability and accountability, relative to other member states. This came despite a reinforced EU legal framework for fiscal data following the episode of the 2004 Greek financial audit. At the request of ECOFIN, Eurostat followed up with a series of EDP methodological visits during 2010, in cooperation with the Greek authorities. As part of this initiative, the Hellenic Statistical Authority (ELSTAT) was established as an independent authority subject to the control of the Greek Parliament. EDP notification tables are required to be published in April and October by each member state.

In the case of Greece, the April 2010 notification contained revised fiscal data for 2006–2009, but with remaining reservations in these areas: statistical classification of public corporations, off-market swaps, social security funds, unaudited budget amounts and payables. These were addressed in the October 2010 EDP notification, a significant revision. However, residual uncertainties, notably for the year 2009, called for another visit, known as "extended". Its outcome is the November 2010 EDP notification (outside the statutory schedule), which is published in a comprehensive report concluding that "revised data for 2006–2009 are sufficiently reliable for EDP purposes". An accompanying information note was published around the same time.

We use the convention that a positive deficit means a negative government balance, and conversely. (Note: Take, for example, the information note. In the second table under "1. Overview of the latest revisions", the figure for "Balance sheet corrections" and "change in deficit" is -370. This corresponds, in fact, to "an addition of EUR 370 million to the 2009 deficit". Using our convention, this would be recorded as +370, not -370.) The following abbreviations (shown in parentheses) are used: local government (LG) and central government (CG) and social security funds (SSF). (Note: These abbreviations can be found in Eurostat publications) These add up to a total known as "General government". We use the convention that 1,000.1 means one thousand and one tenth. (Note: Eurostat sometimes uses 1.000,1 to represent 1,000.1, such as in page 18 of the report)

Fiscal data in 2010 (Note: Reproduced from the information note's Annex I for the April level, and from the report for the revision. The November revision incorporates a 1% downward revision of the GDP for that year.) (in % of GDP)
	April		November revision	
Year	Deficit	Debt	Deficit	Debt
2006	3.6	97.8	+2.18	+8.74
2007	5.1	95.7	+1.32	+9.62
2008	7.7	99.2	+1.71	+10.19
2009	13.6	115.1	+1.62	+10.48

The variation in the published values of general government debt (the total), between the April and the November EDP notifications, is entirely attributable to CG. Hence only the breakdown for the deficit is reproduced below.

Increase in the deficit (Note: The variation is between the published figures of the April and November 2010 EDP notifications, reproduced from the report's Annex I. The report uses the November estimate of GDP for 2009.) (in % of GDP)
Year	LG	SSF	CG	Total
2006	0	+0.76	+1.42	+2.18
2007	+0.04	+0.43	+0.85	+1.32
2008	+0.05	+0.52	+1.15	+1.71
2009	+0.08	+0.79	+0.75	+1.62

Off-market swaps (Note: Reproduced from the report's Annex I. The figures for 2001-2005 are given as comparison, based on the information provided in the report. They are not part of the November 2010 EDP notification (see footnote 18 of the report) which is only concerned with the 2006-2009 period. The impact on fiscal data for 2006–2009 are in full, not the difference relative to the April notification (it's not 100% clear what, of the off-market swaps, was published then). The figures for % of GDP are computed using the rule of three applied to the data of Annex I. For example, 18,666M€ of debt translates to 8.74% of GDP in 2006. Therefore, the amount attributable to the off-market swaps for that year, 5,125.5M€, is divided by 18,666M€ and multiplied by 8.74, yielding 2.40% of GDP. The report contains the following notes about amortization: "There was a grace period of two years in 2002 and 2003, with no settlements exchanged under the IRS so that the amortization of the original loan starts in 2004" and "grace period” (no settlements under the new swap contract agreed in 2005)" for years 2006 and 2007".)
	Impact on fiscal data →		In M€		In % of GDP	
Year	Restructuring	Amortization	Deficit	Debt	Deficit	Debt
2001	Inception		0	2,830.0		
2002		No	0	2,830.0		
2003		No	0	2,830.0		
2004			?	?		
2005	Significant		?	?		
2006		No	0	5,125.5	0	2.40
2007		No	0	5,125.5	0	2.26
2008	Marginal		-123.0	5,400.0	-0.05	2.28
2009			-118.3	5,281.7	-0.05	2.25
