= Greek government-debt crisis =

Sovereign debt crisis faced by Greece (2009–2018)

Economy of Greek government-debt crisis
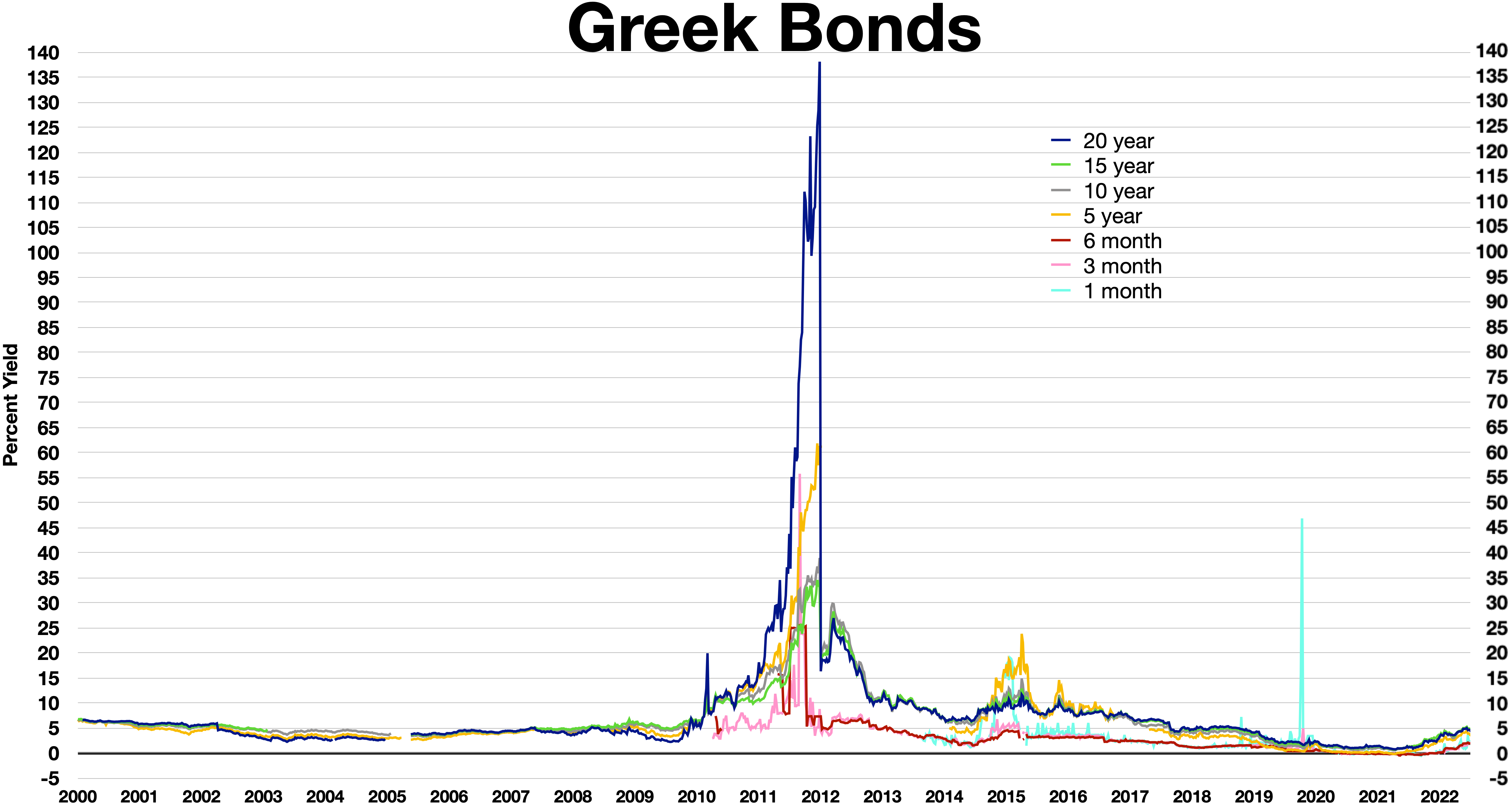
- Fiscal year: October 2009 – March 2019 (9 years)

Statistics
- GDP: 200.29 billion (2017)
- GDP rank: 51 (nominal per World Bank 2017)
- GDP per capita: 23,027.41 (2017)
- GDP per capita rank: 47 (per World Bank 2017)

External
- Gross external debt: $372 billion as of September 2019
- All values, unless otherwise stated, are in US dollars.

Greece faced a sovereign debt crisis in the aftermath of the 2008 financial crisis. Widely known in the country as The Crisis (Greek: Η Κρίση, romanized: I Krísi), it forced the government to carry out a series of sudden reforms and austerity measures, concurrently with loss of income and property. In all, the Greek economy suffered the longest recession of any advanced mixed economy to date and became the first developed country whose stock market was downgraded to that of an emerging market in 2013, only starting to be reclassified back as a developed market by FTSE Russell in October 2025, followed by other index/market classification providers. As a result, the Greek political system was upended, social exclusion increased, and hundreds of thousands of well-educated Greeks left the country, although the majority of those who left had returned as of 2024.

The crisis started in late-2009, triggered by the turmoil of the worldwide Great Recession, structural weaknesses in the Greek economy, and lack of monetary policy flexibility as a member of the eurozone. The crisis included revelations that previous data on government debt levels and deficits had been underreported by the Greek government; the official forecast for the 2009 budget deficit was less than half the final value, and after revisions according to Eurostat methodology, the 2009 government debt was raised from $269.3bn to $299.7bn, about 11% higher than previously reported.

The crisis led to a loss of confidence in the Greek economy, indicated by a widening of bond yield spreads and rising cost of risk insurance on credit default swaps compared to the other eurozone countries, particularly Germany. The government enacted 12 rounds of tax increases, spending cuts, and reforms from 2010-16, which at times triggered local riots and nationwide protests. Despite these efforts, the country required bailout loans in 2010, 2012, and 2015 from the International Monetary Fund, Eurogroup, and the European Central Bank, and negotiated a 50% "haircut" on debt owed to private banks in 2011, which amounted to a €100bn debt relief (a value effectively reduced due to bank recapitalization and other resulting needs).

After a popular referendum which rejected further austerity measures required for the third bailout, and after closure of banks across the country (which lasted for several weeks), on 30 June 2015, Greece became the first developed country to fail to make an IMF loan repayment on time; the payment was made with a 20-day delay. At that time, debt levels stood at €323bn or some €30,000 per capita, little changed since the beginning of the crisis and at a per capita value below the OECD average, but high as a percentage of the respective GDP.

Between 2009–2017, the Greek government debt rose from €300bn to €318bn. However, during the same period the Greek debt-to-GDP ratio rose up from 127% to 179%, due to the severe GDP drop during the handling of the crisis.

In June 2026, Greece repaid a further €6.9bn from its first bailout package ahead of schedule as part of a broader effort to improve its financial standing and reduce debt. This follows previous earlier repayments to EU creditors, as well as completion of repayment of Greece’s loans to the International Monetary Fund two years ahead of schedule in 2022. The early debt repayments were seen as part of the country's notable recovery following the end of the crisis in 2018, further evidenced by dramatically reduced borrowing costs for the country, with its benchmark 10-year government bond yields falling below Italy's on 8 November 2019, as well as France's on 29 November 2024.

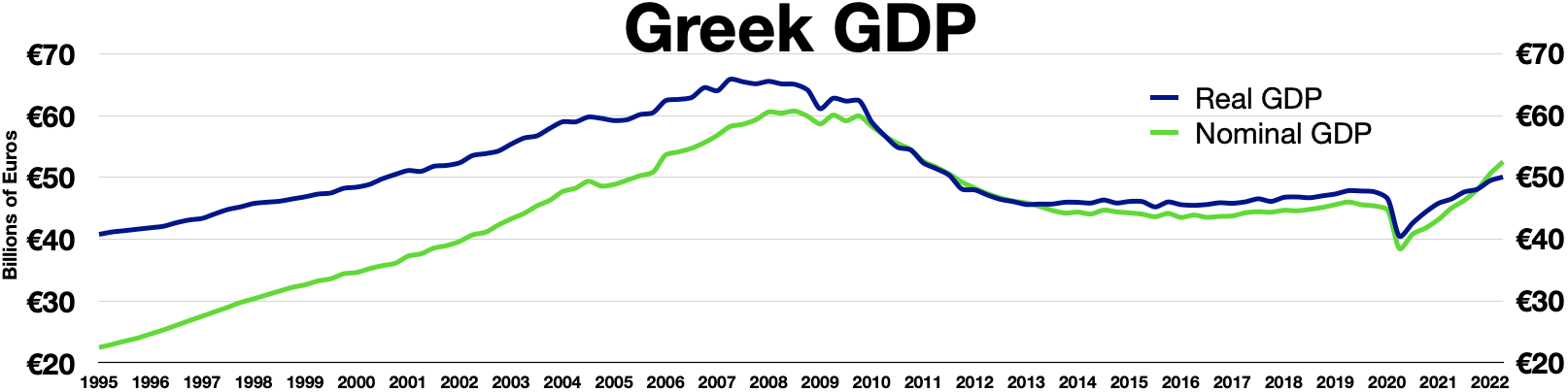
Greek GDP Real GDP (chained 2010 Euros) Nominal GDP

Relative change in unit labour costs, 2000–2017

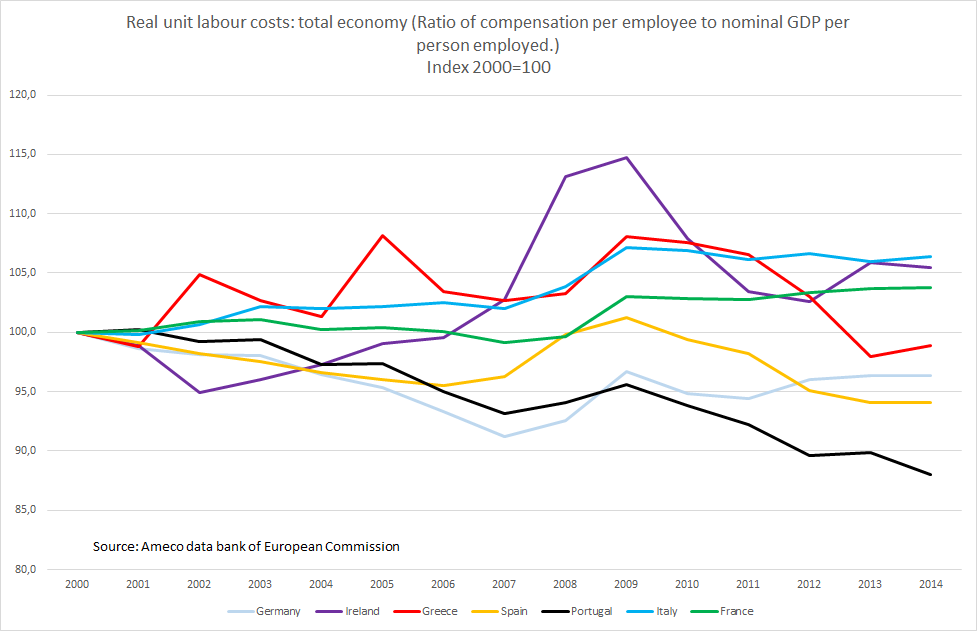
Real unit labour costs: total economy (ratio of compensation per employee to nominal GDP per person employed)

== Overview ==
=== Historical debt ===
Average public debt-to-GDP (1909–2008 (Note: 100-year period up to the eve of the Greek debt crisis))
Country	Average public debt-to-GDP (% of GDP)
United Kingdom	104.7
Belgium	86.0
Italy	76.0
Canada	71.0
France	62.6
Greece	60.2
United States	47.1
Germany	32.1

Greece, like other European nations, had faced debt crises in the 19th century, as well as a similar crisis in 1932 during the Great Depression. While economists Carmen Reinhart and Kenneth Rogoff wrote that "from 1800 until well after World War II, Greece found itself virtually in continual default", (referring to a period which included Greece's war of independence, two wars with the Ottoman Empire, two Balkan wars, two World Wars, and a Civil War) Greece recorded fewer cases of default than Spain or Portugal in the aforementioned period (in reality starting from 1830, as this was the year of Greece's independence). Actually, during the 20th century, Greece enjoyed one of the highest GDP growth rates in the world and average Greek government debt-to-GDP from 1909 to 2008 (a century until the eve of the debt crisis) was lower than that of the UK, Canada or France. During the 30-year period immediately prior to its entrance into the European Economic Community in 1981, the Greek government's debt-to-GDP ratio averaged only 19.8%. Indeed, accession to the EEC (and later the European Union) was predicated on keeping the debt-to-GDP well below the 60% level, and certain members watched this figure closely.

Between 1981 and 1993, Greece's debt-to-GDP ratio steadily rose, surpassing the average of what is today the eurozone in the mid-1980s. For the next 15 years, from 1993 to 2007, Greece's government debt-to-GDP ratio remained roughly unchanged (not affected by the 2004 Athens Olympics), averaging 102%; this figure was lower than that of Italy (107%) and Belgium (110%) during the same 15-year period, and comparable to that for the U.S. or the OECD average in 2017. During the latter period, the country's annual budget deficit usually exceeded 3% of GDP, but its effect on the debt-to-GDP ratio was counterbalanced by high GDP growth rates. The debt-to-GDP values for 2006 and 2007 (about 105%) were established after audits resulted in corrections of up to 10 percentage points for the particular years. These corrections, although altering the debt level by a maximum of about 10%, resulted in a popular notion that "Greece was previously hiding its debt".

=== Evolutions after birth of euro currency ===
The 2001 introduction of the Euro reduced trade costs between eurozone countries, increasing overall trade volume. Labor costs increased more (from a lower base) in peripheral countries such as Greece relative to core countries such as Germany without compensating rise in productivity, eroding Greece's competitive edge. As a result, Greece's current account (trade) deficit rose significantly.

A trade deficit means that a country is consuming more than it produces, which requires borrowing/direct investment from other countries. Both the Greek trade deficit and budget deficit rose from below 5% of GDP in 1999 to peak around 15% of GDP in the 2008–2009 periods. One driver of the investment inflow was Greece's membership in the EU and the eurozone. Greece was perceived as a higher credit risk alone than it was as a member of the eurozone, which implied that investors felt the EU would bring discipline to its finances and support Greece in the event of problems.

As the Great Recession spread to Europe, the amount of funds lent from the European core countries (e.g. Germany) to the peripheral countries such as Greece began to decline. Reports in 2009 of Greek fiscal mismanagement and deception increased borrowing costs; the combination meant Greece could no longer borrow to finance its trade and budget deficits at an affordable cost.

A country facing a 'sudden stop' in private investment and a high (local currency) debt load typically allows its currency to depreciate to encourage investment and to pay back the debt in devalued currency. This was not possible while Greece remained in the euro. "However, the sudden stop has not prompted the European periphery countries to move toward devaluation by abandoning the euro, in part because capital transfers from euro-area partners have allowed them to finance current account deficits". In addition, to become more competitive, Greek wages fell nearly 20% from mid-2010 to 2014, a form of deflation. This significantly reduced income and GDP, resulting in a severe recession, decline in tax receipts and a significant rise in the debt-to-GDP ratio. Unemployment reached nearly 25%, from below 10% in 2003. Significant government spending cuts helped the Greek government return to a primary budget surplus by 2014 (collecting more revenue than it paid out, excluding interest).

== Causes ==
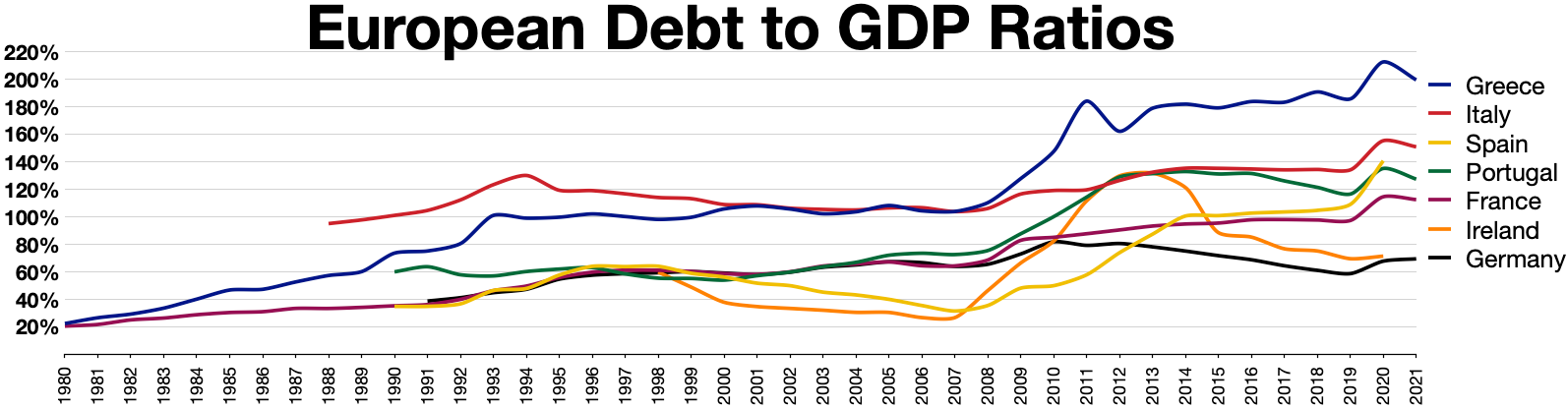
European debt to GDP ratios Greece Italy Spain Portugal France Ireland Germany

=== External factors ===
The Greek crisis was triggered primarily by the Great Recession, which led the budget deficits of several Western nations to reach or exceed 10% of GDP. In the case of Greece, the high budget deficit (which, after several corrections, was revealed to have reached 10.2% and 15.1% of GDP in 2008 and 2009 respectively) was coupled with a high public debt to GDP ratio (which was relatively stable for several years prior to the crisis, at just above 100% of GDP after corrections). Thus, the country appeared to lose control of its public debt to GDP ratio, which reached 127% of GDP in 2009. In contrast, Italy was able to keep its 2009 budget deficit at 5.1% of GDP despite the crisis, which was crucial, given that it had a public debt to GDP ratio comparable to Greece's. In addition, being a member of the eurozone, Greece had essentially no autonomous monetary policy flexibility.

Finally, dramatic revisions in Greek budget statistics were heavily reported on by media and condemned by other EU states, leading to strong reactions in private bond markets. As a result of the appearance of impropriety, market interest rates on Greek debt rose dramatically in early 2010, making it much more challenging for the country to finance its debt.

=== Internal factors ===
There have been arguments regarding the country's poor macroeconomic handling between 2001 and 2009, including the significant reliance of the country's economic growth to vulnerable factors such as tourism.

In January 2010, the Greek Ministry of Finance published Stability and Growth Program 2010, which listed the main causes of the crisis including poor GDP growth, government debt and deficits, budget compliance and data credibility. Causes found by others included excess government spending, current account deficits, tax avoidance and tax evasion.

==== GDP growth ====
After 2008, GDP growth was lower than the Greek national statistical agency had anticipated. The Greek Ministry of Finance reported the need to improve competitiveness by reducing salaries and bureaucracy and to redirect governmental spending from non-growth sectors such as the military into growth-stimulating sectors.

The Great Recession had a particularly large negative impact on GDP growth rates in Greece. Two of the country's largest earners, tourism and shipping, were badly affected by the downturn, with revenues falling 15% in 2009.

==== Government deficit ====
Fiscal imbalances developed from 2004 to 2009: "output increased in nominal terms by 40%, while central government primary expenditures increased by 87% against an increase of only 31% in tax revenues." The Ministry intended to implement real expenditure cuts that would allow expenditures to grow 3.8% from 2009 to 2013, well below expected inflation at 6.9%. Overall revenues were expected to grow 31.5% from 2009 to 2013, secured by new, higher taxes and by a major reform of the ineffective tax collection system. The deficit needed to decline to a level compatible with a declining debt-to-GDP ratio.

==== Government debt ====
The debt increased in 2009 due to the higher-than-expected government deficit and higher debt-service costs. The Greek government assessed that structural economic reforms would be insufficient, as the debt would still increase to an unsustainable level before the positive results of reforms could be achieved. In addition to structural reforms, permanent and temporary austerity measures (with a size relative to GDP of 4.0% in 2010, 3.1% in 2011, 2.8% in 2012 and 0.8% in 2013) were needed. Reforms and austerity measures, in combination with an expected return of positive economic growth in 2011, would reduce the baseline deficit from €30.6 billion in 2009 to €5.7 billion in 2013, while the debt/GDP ratio would stabilize at 120% in 2010–2011 and decline in 2012 and 2013.

After 1993, the debt-to-GDP ratio remained above 94%. The Great Recession caused the debt level to exceed the maximum sustainable level, defined by IMF economists to be 120%. According to the report "The Economic Adjustment Programme for Greece" published by the EU Commission in October 2011, the debt level was expected to reach 198% in 2012, if the proposed debt restructure agreement was not implemented.

==== Budget compliance ====
Budget compliance was acknowledged to need improvement. For 2009 it was found to be "a lot worse than normal, due to economic control being more lax in a year with political elections". The government wanted to strengthen the monitoring system in 2010, making it possible to track revenues and expenses at both national and local levels.

==== Data credibility ====
Problems with unreliable data had existed since Greece applied for Euro membership in 1999. In the five years from 2005 to 2009, Eurostat noted reservations about Greek fiscal data in five semiannual assessments of the quality of EU member states' public finance statistics. In its January 2010 report on Greek Government Deficit and Debt Statistics, the European Commission/Eurostat wrote (page 28): "On five occasions since 2004 reservations have been expressed by Eurostat on the Greek data in the biannual press release on deficit and debt data. When the Greek EDP data have been published without reservations, this has been the result of Eurostat interventions before or during the notification period in order to correct mistakes or inappropriate recording, with the result of increasing the notified deficit." Previously reported figures were consistently revised down. The misreported data made it impossible to predict GDP growth, deficit and debt. By the end of each year, all were below estimates. Data problems had been evident over time in several other countries, but in the case of Greece, the problems were so persistent and so severe that the European Commission/Eurostat wrote in its January 2010 Report on Greek Government Deficit and Debt Statistics (page 3): "Revisions of this magnitude in the estimated past government deficit ratios have been extremely rare in the other EU Member States, but have taken place for Greece on several occasions. These most recent revisions are an illustration of the lack of quality of the Greek fiscal statistics (and of macroeconomic statistics in general) and show that the progress in the compilation of fiscal statistics in Greece, and the intense scrutiny of the Greek fiscal data by Eurostat since 2004 (including 10 EDP visits and 5 reservations on the notified data), have not sufficed to bring the quality of Greek fiscal data to the level reached by other EU Member States." And the same report further noted (page 7): "The partners in the ESS [European Statistical System] are supposed to cooperate in good faith. Deliberate misreporting or fraud is not foreseen in the regulation."

In April 2010, in the context of the semiannual notification of deficit and debt statistics under the EU's Excessive Deficit Procedure, the Greek government deficit for years 2006–2008 was revised upward by about 1.5–2 percentage points for each year and the deficit for 2009 was estimated for the first time at 13.6%, the second highest in the EU relative to GDP behind Ireland at 14.3% and the United Kingdom third at 11.5%. Greek government debt for 2009 was estimated at 115.1% of GDP, which was the second highest in the EU after Italy's 115.8%. Yet, these deficit and debt statistics reported by Greece were again published with reservation by Eurostat, "due to uncertainties on the surplus of social security funds for 2009, on the classification of some public entities and on the recording of off-market swaps."

The revised statistics revealed that Greece from 2000 to 2010 had exceeded the eurozone stability criteria, with yearly deficits exceeding the recommended maximum limit at 3.0% of GDP, and with the debt level significantly above the limit of 60% of GDP. It is widely accepted that the persistent misreporting and lack of credibility of Greece's official statistics over many years was an important enabling condition for the buildup of Greece's fiscal problems and eventually its debt crisis. The February 2014 Report of the European Parliament on the inquiry on the role and operations of the Troika (ECB, Commission and IMF) with regard to the euro area program countries (paragraph 5) states: "[The European Parliament] is of the opinion that the problematic situation of Greece was also due to statistical fraud in the years preceding the setting-up of the programme".

==== Government spending ====
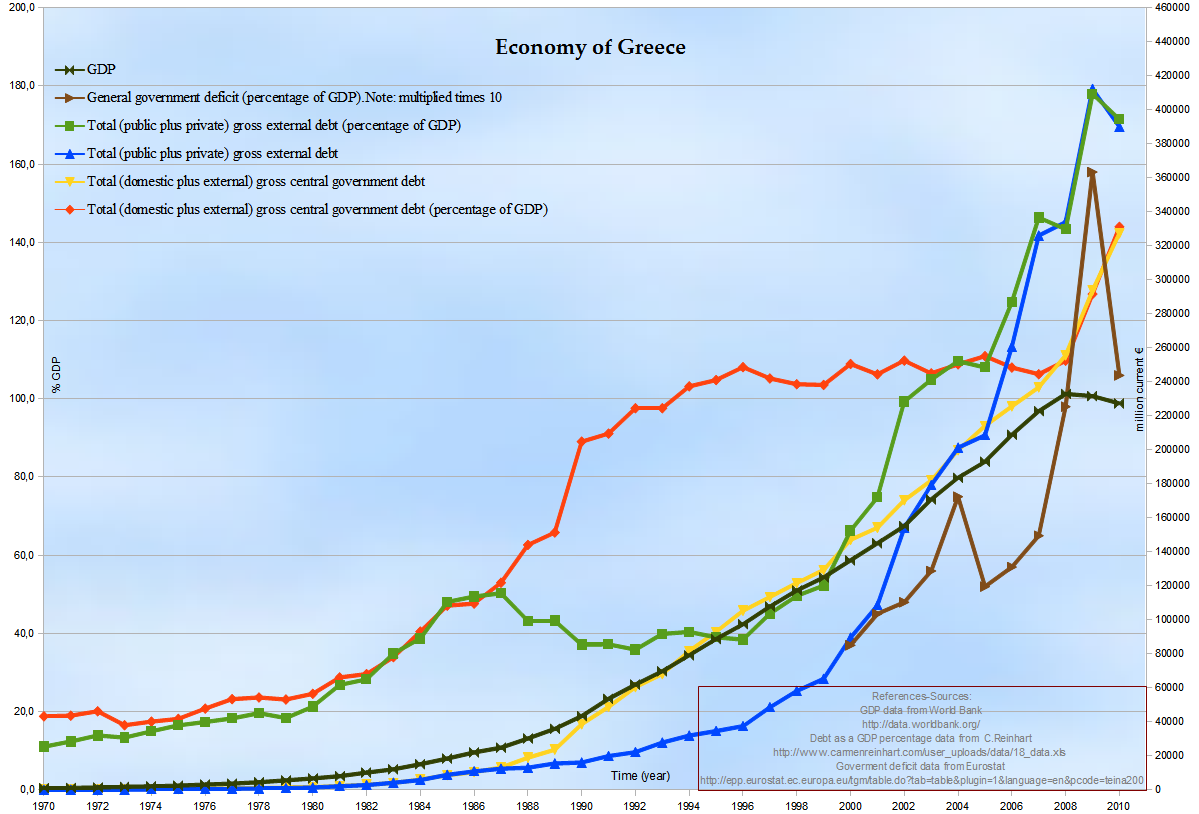
Combined charts of Greece's GDP and debt since 1970; also of deficit since 2000. Absolute terms time series are in current euros. Public deficit (brown) worsened to 10% in 2008, 15% in 2009 and 11% in 2010. As a result, the public debt-to-GDP ratio (red) rose from 109% in 2008 to 146% in 2010.

The Greek economy was one of the eurozone's fastest growing from 2000 to 2007, averaging 4.2% annually, as foreign capital flooded in. This capital inflow coincided with a higher budget deficit.

Greece had budget surpluses from 1960 to 1973, but thereafter it had budget deficits. From 1974 to 1980 the government had budget deficits below 3% of GDP, while 1981–2013 deficits were above 3%.

An editorial published by Kathimerini claimed that after the removal of the right-wing military junta in 1974, Greek governments wanted to bring left-leaning Greeks into the economic mainstream and so ran large deficits to finance military expenditures, public sector jobs, pensions and other social benefits.

In 2008, Greece was the largest importer of conventional weapons in Europe and its military spending was the highest in the European Union relative to the country's GDP, reaching twice the European average. Even in 2013, Greece had the second-biggest defense spending in NATO as a percentage of GDP, after the US.

Pre-Euro, currency devaluation helped to finance Greek government borrowing. Thereafter, this tool disappeared. Greece was able to continue borrowing because of the lower interest rates for Euro bonds, in combination with strong GDP growth.

==== Current account balance ====
Current account imbalances (1997–2014)

Economist Paul Krugman wrote, "What we're basically looking at ... is a balance of payments problem, in which capital flooded south after the creation of the euro, leading to overvaluation in southern Europe" and "In truth, this has never been a fiscal crisis at its root; it has always been a balance of payments crisis that manifests itself in part in budget problems, which have then been pushed onto the center of the stage by ideology."

The translation of trade deficits to budget deficits works through sectoral balances. Greece ran current account (trade) deficits averaging 9.1% GDP from 2000 to 2011. By definition, a trade deficit requires capital inflow (mainly borrowing) to fund; this is referred to as a capital surplus or foreign financial surplus.

Greece's large budget deficit was funded by running a large foreign financial surplus. As the inflow of money stopped during the crisis, reducing the foreign financial surplus, Greece was forced to reduce its budget deficit substantially. Countries facing such a sudden reversal in capital flows typically devalue their currencies to resume the inflow of capital; however, Greece was unable to do this, and so has instead suffered significant income (GDP) reduction, an internal form of devaluation.

==== Tax evasion and corruption ====
Corruption Perceptions Index 2008 (before the Greek debt crisis): Worst EU Performers
Country	CPI Score 2008 (World Rank)
Bulgaria	3.6 (72)
Romania	3.8 (70)
Poland	4.6 (58)
Lithuania	4.6 (58)
Greece	4.7 (57)
Italy	4.8 (55)
Latvia	5.0 (52)
Slovakia	5.0 (52)
Hungary	5.1 (47)
Czech Republic	5.2 (45)
Malta	5.8 (36)
Portugal	6.1 (32)

Before the crisis, Greece was one of the EU's worst performers according to Transparency International's Corruption Perception Index (see table). At some time during the culmination of the crisis, it temporarily became the worst performer. One bailout condition was to implement an anti-corruption strategy; by 2017 the situation had improved, but the respective score remained one of the worst in the EU.

Shadow Economy (% of GDP) in 2017 (Selected EU Countries)
Country	Shadow Economy (% of GDP)
Estonia	24.6
Malta	23.6
Hungary	22.4
Slovenia	22.4
Poland	22.2
Greece	21.5
Italy	19.8
Spain	17.2
Belgium	15.6
France	12.8
Sweden	12.1
Germany	10.4

The ability to pay its debts depends greatly on the amount of tax the government is able to collect. In Greece, tax receipts were consistently below the expected level. Data for 2012 indicated that the Greek "shadow economy" or "underground economy", from which little or no tax was collected, was a full 24.3% of GDP – compared with 28.6% for Estonia, 26.5% for Latvia, 21.6% for Italy, 17.1% for Belgium, 14.7% for Sweden, 13.7% for Finland, and 13.5% for Germany. (The situation had improved for Greece, along with most EU countries, by 2017). Given that tax evasion is correlated with the percentage of working population that is self-employed, the result was predictable in Greece, where in 2013 the percentage of self-employed workers was more than double the EU average.

Also in 2012, Swiss estimates suggested that Greeks had some 20 billion euros in Switzerland, of which only one percent had been declared as taxable in Greece. In 2015, estimates indicated that the amount of evaded taxes stored in Swiss banks was around 80 billion euros.

A mid-2017 report indicated Greeks were being "taxed to the hilt" and many believed that the risk of penalties for tax evasion were less serious than the risk of bankruptcy. One method of evasion that was continuing was the so-called "black market" or "grey economy" or "underground economy": work is done for cash payment which is not declared as income; as well, VAT is not collected and remitted. A January 2017 report by the DiaNEOsis think-tank indicated that unpaid taxes in Greece at the time totaled approximately 95 billion euros, up from 76 billion euros in 2015, much of it was expected to be uncollectable. The same study estimated that the loss to the government as a result of tax evasion was between 6% and 9% of the country's GDP, or roughly between 11 billion and 16 billion euros per annum.

The shortfall in the collection of VAT (roughly, sales tax) was also significant. In 2014, the government collected 28% less than was owed to it; this shortfall was about double the average for the EU. The uncollected amount that year was about 4.9 billion euros. The 2017 DiaNEOsis study estimated that 3.5% of GDP was lost due to VAT fraud, while losses due to smuggling of alcohol, tobacco and petrol amounted to approximately another 0.5% of the country's GDP.

===== Actions to reduce tax evasion =====
Following similar actions by the United Kingdom and Germany, the Greek government was in talks with Switzerland in 2011, to try to force Swiss banks to reveal information on the bank accounts of Greek citizens. The Ministry of Finance stated that Greeks with Swiss bank accounts would be required either to pay a tax or to reveal information such as the identity of the bank account holder to the Greek internal revenue services. The Greek and Swiss governments hoped to reach a deal on the matter by the end of 2011.

The solution demanded by Greece had still not been effected as of 2015; when there was an estimated €80 billion of taxes evaded on Swiss bank accounts. But by then the Greek and Swiss governments were seriously negotiating a tax treaty to address this issue. On 1 March 2016 Switzerland ratified an agreement creating a new tax transparency law to fight tax evasion more effectively. Starting in 2018, banks in both Greece and Switzerland were to exchange information about the bank accounts of citizens of the other country, to minimize the possibility of hiding untaxed income.

In 2016 and 2017, the government was encouraging the use of credit cards and debit cards to pay for goods and services in order to reduce cash only payments. By January 2017, taxpayers were only granted tax allowances or deductions when payments were made electronically, with a "paper trail" of the transactions that the government could easily audit. This was expected to reduce the problem of businesses taking payments but not issuing an invoice. This tactic had been used by various companies to avoid payment of VAT as well as income tax.

By 28 July 2017, numerous businesses were required by law to install a point of sale (POS) device to enable them to accept payment by credit or debit card. Failure to comply can lead to fines of up to €1,500. The requirement applied to around 400,000 firms or individuals in 85 professions. The greater use of cards had helped to achieve significant increases in VAT receipts in 2016.

== Chronology ==
=== 2010 revelations and IMF bailout ===
Despite the crisis, the Greek government's bond auction in January 2010 of €8bn 5-year bonds was 4x over-subscribed. The next auction (March) sold €5bn in 10-year bonds reached 3x. However, yields (interest rates) increased, which worsened the deficit. In April 2010, it was estimated that up to 70% of Greek government bonds were held by foreign investors, primarily banks.

In April, following publication of GDP data which showed an intermittent period of recession starting in 2007, credit rating agencies then downgraded Greek bonds to junk status in late April 2010. This froze private capital markets, and put Greece in danger of sovereign default without a bailout.

On 2 May, the European Commission, European Central Bank (ECB) and International Monetary Fund (IMF) (the Troika) launched a €110 billion bailout loan to rescue Greece from sovereign default and cover its financial needs through June 2013, conditional on implementation of austerity measures, structural reforms and privatization of government assets. The bailout loans were mainly used to pay for the maturing bonds, but also to finance the continued yearly budget deficits.

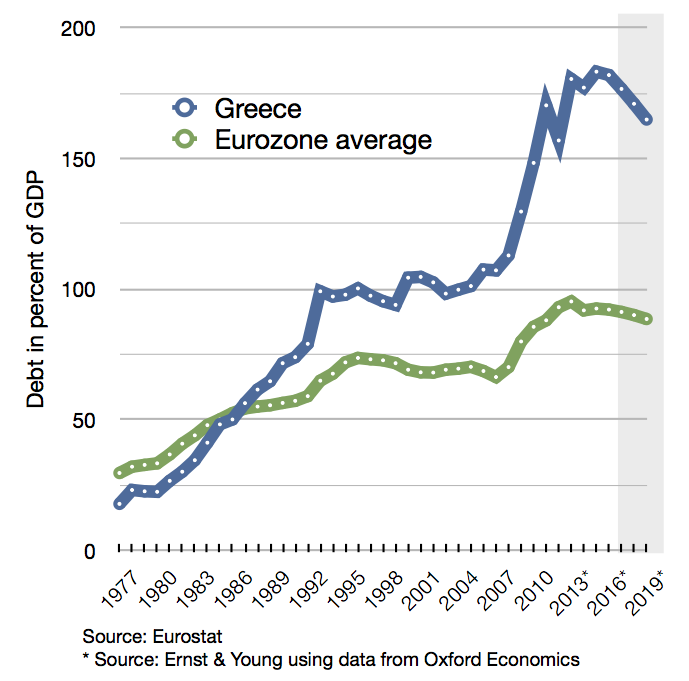
Greece's debt percentage since 1977, compared to the average of the eurozone

==== Fraudulent statistics, revisions and controversies ====
To keep within the monetary union guidelines, the government of Greece for many years simply misreported economic statistics. The areas in which Greece's deficit and debt statistics did not follow common European Union rules spanned about a dozen different areas outlined and explained in two European Commission/Eurostat reports, from January 2010 (including its very detailed and candid annex) and from November 2010.

For example, at the beginning of 2010, it was discovered that Goldman Sachs and other banks had arranged financial transactions involving the use of derivatives to reduce the Greek government's nominal foreign currency debt, in a manner that the banks claim was consistent with EU debt reporting rules, but which others have argued were contrary at the very least to the spirit of the reporting rules of such instruments. Christoforos Sardelis, former head of Greece's Public Debt Management Agency, said that the country did not understand what it was buying. He also said he learned that "other EU countries such as Italy" had made similar deals (while similar cases were reported for other countries, including Belgium, Portugal, and even Germany).

Most notable was a cross currency swap, where billions worth of Greek debts and loans were converted into yen and dollars at a fictitious exchange rate, thus hiding the true extent of Greek loans. Such off market swaps were not originally registered as debt because Eurostat statistics did not include such financial derivatives until March 2008, when Eurostat issued a Guidance note that instructed countries to record as debt such instruments. A German derivatives dealer commented, "The Maastricht rules can be circumvented quite legally through swaps", and "In previous years, Italy used a similar trick to mask its true debt with the help of a different US bank." These conditions enabled Greece and other governments to spend beyond their means, while ostensibly meeting EU deficit targets. However, while in 2008 other EU countries with such off-market swaps declared them to Eurostat and went back to correct their debt data (with reservations and disputes remaining), the Greek government told Eurostat it had no such off market swaps and did not adjust its debt measure as required by the rules. The European Commission/Eurostat November 2010 report explains the situation in detail and inter alia notes (page 17): "In 2008 the Greek authorities wrote to Eurostat that: "The State does not engage in options, forwards, futures or FOREX swaps, nor in off market swaps (swaps with non-zero market value at inception)." In reality, however, according to the same report, at end-2008 Greece had off-market swaps with a market value of 5.4 billion Euro, thus understating the value of general government debt by the same amount (2.3 percent of GDP). The European statistics agency, Eurostat, had at regular intervals from 2004 to 2010, sent 10 delegations to Athens with a view to improving the reliability of Greek statistical figures. In January it issued a report that contained accusations of falsified data and political interference. The Finance Ministry accepted the need to restore trust among investors and correct methodological flaws, "by making the National Statistics Service an independent legal entity and phasing in, during the first quarter of 2010, all the necessary checks and balances".

The new government of George Papandreou revised the 2009 deficit forecast from a previous 6%–8% to 12.7% of GDP. The final value, after revisions concluded in the following year using Eurostat's standardized method, was 15.4% of GDP. The figure for Greek government debt at the end of 2009 increased from its first November estimate at €269.3 billion (113% of GDP) to a revised €299.7 billion (127% of GDP). This was the highest for any EU country.

The methodology of revisions, has led to a certain controversy. Specifically, questions have been raised about the way the cost of aforementioned previous actions such as cross currency swaps was estimated, and why it was retroactively added to the 2006, 2007, 2008 and 2009 budget deficits, rather than to those of earlier years, more relevant to the transactions. However, Eurostat and ELSTAT have explained in detail in public reports from November 2010 that the proper recording of off-market swaps that was carried out in November 2010 increased the stock of debt for each year for which the swaps were outstanding (including the years 2006–2009) by about 2.3 percent of GDP but at the same time decreased -not increased- the deficit for each of these years by about 0.02 percent of GDP. Regarding the latter, the Eurostat report explains: " at the same time [as the upward correction of the debt stock], there must be a correction throughout the whole period for the deficit of Greece, as the flows of interest under the swap contract are reduced by an amount equal to the part of any settlement flows relating to the amortisation of the loan (this is a financial transaction with no impact on the deficit), whereas interest on the loan are still imputed as expenditure." Further questions involve the way deficits of several legal entities from the non-financial corporations in the General Government sector were estimated and retroactively added to the same years' (2006 to 2009) budget deficits. Nevertheless, both Eurostat and ELSTAT have explained in public reports how the previous misclassification of certain (17 in number) government enterprises and other government entities outside the General Government sector was corrected as they did not meet the criteria for being classified outside the General Government. As the Eurostat report noted, "Eurostat discovered that the ESA 95 rules for classification of state owned units were not being applied." In the context of this controversy, the former head of Greece's statistical agency, Andreas Georgiou, has been accused of inflating Greece's budget deficit for the aforementioned years. He was cleared of charges of inflating Greece's deficit in February 2019. It has been argued by many international as well as Greek observers that "despite overwhelming evidence that Mr. Georgiou correctly applied EU rules in revising Greece's fiscal deficit and debt figures, and despite strong international support for his case, some Greek courts continued the witch hunt."

The combined corrections lead to an increase of the Greek public debt by about 10%. Following the financial audit of the fiscal years 2006–2009 Eurostat announced in November 2010 that the revised figures for 2006–2009 finally were considered to be reliable.

=== 2011 ===
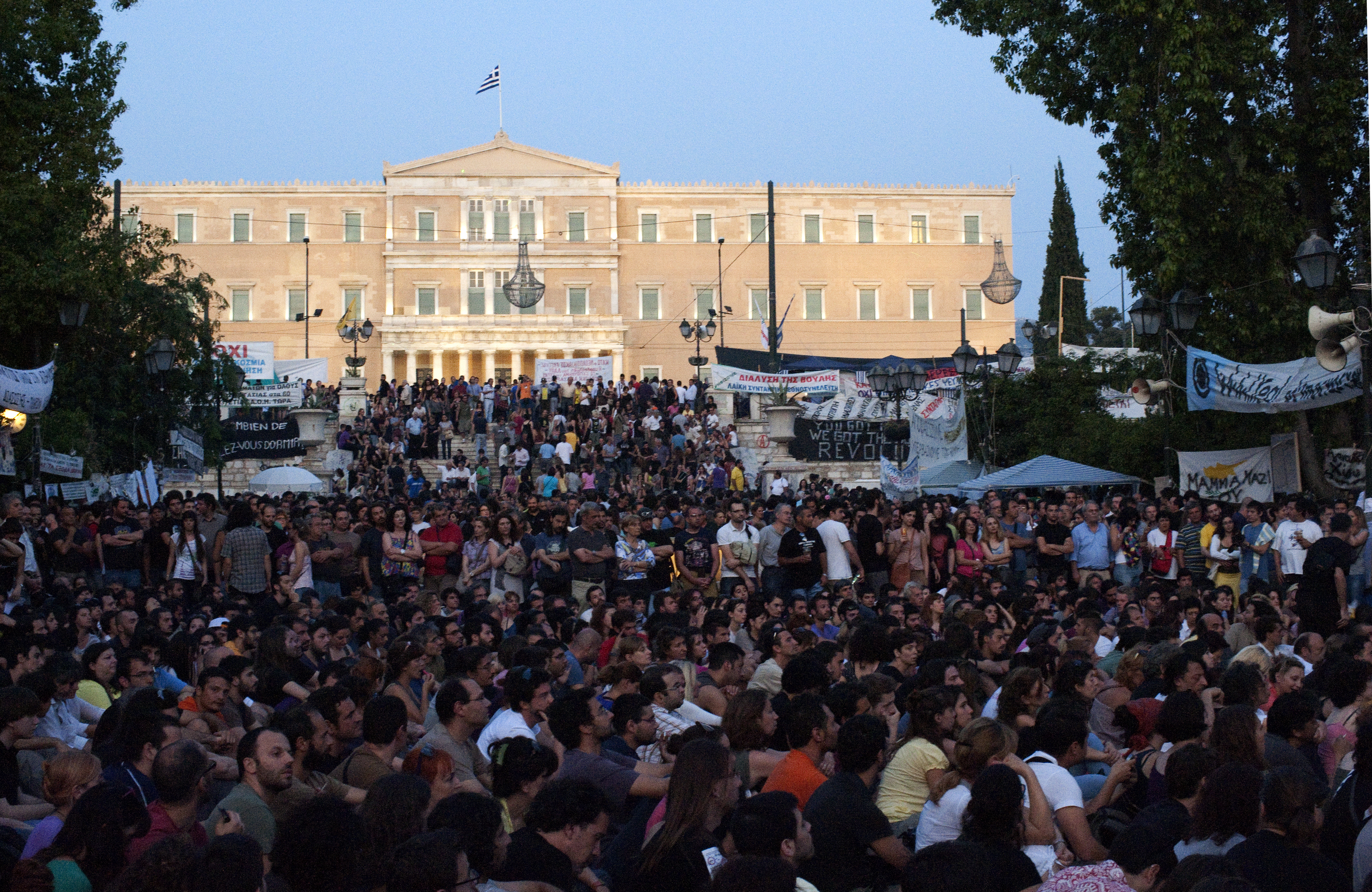
Protests in Greece during the debt crisis

A year later, a worsened recession along with the poor performance of the Greek government in achieving the conditions of the agreed bailout, forced a second bailout. In July 2011, private creditors agreed to a voluntary haircut of 21 percent on their Greek debt, but eurozone officials considered this write-down to be insufficient. Especially Wolfgang Schäuble, the German finance minister, and Angela Merkel, the German chancellor, "pushed private creditors to accept a 50 percent loss on their Greek bonds", while Jean-Claude Trichet of the European Central Bank had long opposed a haircut for private investors, "fearing that it could undermine the vulnerable European banking system". When private investors agreed to accept bigger losses, the Troika launched the second bailout worth €130 billion. This included a bank recapitalization package worth €48bn. Private bondholders were required to accept extended maturities, lower interest rates and a 53.5% reduction in the bonds' face value.

On 17 October 2011, Minister of Finance Evangelos Venizelos announced that the government would establish a new fund, aimed at helping those who were hit the hardest from the government's austerity measures. The money for this agency would come from a crackdown on tax evasion.

The government agreed to creditor proposals that Greece raise up to €50 billion through the sale or development of state-owned assets, but receipts were much lower than expected, while the policy was strongly opposed by the left-wing political party, Syriza. In 2014, only €530m was raised. Some key assets were sold to insiders.

=== 2012 ===
The second bailout programme was ratified in February 2012. A total of €240 billion was to be transferred in regular tranches through December 2014. The recession worsened and the government continued to dither over bailout program implementation. In December 2012 the Troika provided Greece with more debt relief, while the IMF extended an extra €8.2bn of loans to be transferred from January 2015 to March 2016.

=== 2014 ===
The fourth review of the bailout programme revealed unexpected financing gaps. In 2014 the outlook for the Greek economy was optimistic. The government predicted a structural surplus in 2014, opening access to the private lending market to the extent that its entire financing gap for 2014 was covered via private bond sales. Despite the promising start to 2014, a fourth recession began in Q4-2014.

The parliament called snap parliamentary elections in December, leading to a Syriza-led government that rejected the existing bailout terms. Like the previous Greek governments, the Syriza-led government was met with the same response from Troika, "Pacta sunt servanda" (agreements must be kept). The Troika suspended all scheduled remaining aid to Greece, until the Greek government retreated or convinced the Troika to accept a revised programme. This rift caused a liquidity crisis (both for the Greek government and Greek financial system), plummeting stock prices at the Athens Stock Exchange and a renewed loss of access to private financing.

=== 2015 ===
Following Greece's January snap election, the Troika granted a further four-month technical extension of its bailout programme; expecting that the payment terms would be renegotiated before the end of April, allowing for the review and the last financial transfer to be completed before the end of June.

Facing sovereign default, the government made new proposals in the first and second half of June. Both were rejected, raising the prospect of recessionary capital controls to avoid a collapse of the banking sector – and Greek exit from the eurozone.

The government unilaterally broke off negotiations on 26 June. Greek prime minister Alexis Tsipras announced that a referendum would be held on 5 July to approve or reject the Troika's 25 June proposal. The Greek stock market closed on 27 June.

The government campaigned for rejection of the proposal, while four opposition parties (PASOK, To Potami, KIDISO and New Democracy) objected that the proposed referendum was unconstitutional. They petitioned for the parliament or president to reject the referendum proposal. Meanwhile, the Eurogroup announced that the existing second bailout agreement would technically expire on 30 June, 5 days before the referendum.

The Eurogroup clarified on 27 June that only if an agreement was reached prior to 30 June could the bailout be extended until the referendum on 5 July. The Eurogroup wanted the government to take some responsibility for the subsequent program, presuming that the referendum resulted in approval. The Eurogroup had signaled willingness to uphold their "November 2012 debt relief promise", presuming a final agreement. This promise was that if Greece completed the program, but its debt-to-GDP ratio subsequently was forecast to be over 124% in 2020 or 110% in 2022 for any reason, then the eurozone would provide debt-relief sufficient to ensure that these two targets would still be met.

On 28 June the referendum was approved by the Greek parliament with no interim bailout agreement. The ECB decided to stop its Emergency Liquidity Assistance to Greek banks. Many Greeks continued to withdraw cash from their accounts fearing that capital controls would soon be invoked.

On 5 July a 61% majority voted to reject the bailout terms. This caused stock indexes worldwide to tumble, fearing Greece's potential exit from the eurozone ("Grexit"). Following the vote, Greece's finance minister Yanis Varoufakis stepped down on 6 July, because of Prime Minister Alexis Tsipras denial to follow the public vote, and was replaced by Euclid Tsakalotos.

On 13 July, following 17 hours of negotiations, Eurozone leaders reached a provisional agreement on a third bailout programme, substantially the same as their June proposal. Many financial analysts, including the largest private holder of Greek debt, private equity firm manager, Paul Kazarian, found issue with its findings, citing it as a distortion of net debt position.

=== 2017 ===
On 20 February 2017, the Greek finance ministry reported that the government's debt load had reached €226.36 billion after increasing by €2.65 billion in the previous quarter. By the middle of 2017, the yield on Greek government bonds began approaching pre-2010 levels, signalling a potential return to economic normalcy for the country. According to the International Monetary Fund (IMF), Greece's GDP was estimated to grow by 2.8% in 2017.

The Medium-term Fiscal Strategy Framework 2018–2021 voted on 19 May 2017 introduced amendments of the provisions of the 2016 thirteenth austerity package.

In June 2017, news reports indicated that the "crushing debt burden" had not been alleviated and that Greece was at the risk of defaulting on some payments. The International Monetary Fund stated that the country should be able to borrow again "in due course". At the time, the eurozone gave Greece another credit of $9.5-billion, $8.5 billion of loans and brief details of a possible debt relief with the assistance of the IMF. On 13 July, the Greek government sent a letter of intent to the IMF with 21 commitments it promised to meet by June 2018. They included changes in labour laws, a plan to cap public sector work contracts, to transform temporary contracts into permanent agreements and to recalculate pension payments to reduce spending on social security.

=== 2018 ===
On 21 June 2018, Greece's creditors agreed on a 10-year extension of maturities on 96.6 billion euros of loans (i.e. almost a third of Greece's total debt), as well as a 10-year grace period in interest and amortization payments on the same loans. Greece successfully exited (as declared) the bailouts on 20 August 2018.

=== 2019 ===
In March 2019, Greece sold 10-year bonds for the first time since before the bailout. After the July 2019 Greek parliamentary election Greece's economy, under the new Prime Minister Kyriakos Mitsotakis, began a prolonged period of growth.

=== 2021 ===
In March 2021, Greece sold its first 30-year bond since the 2008 financial crisis. The bond issue raised 2.5 billion euros.

== Bailout programmes ==
=== First Economic Adjustment Programme ===
On 1 May 2010, the Greek government announced a series of austerity measures. On 3 May, the eurozone countries and the IMF agreed to a three-year €110 billion loan, paying 5.5% interest, conditional on the implementation of austerity measures. Credit rating agencies immediately downgraded Greek governmental bonds to an even lower junk status.

The programme was met with anger by the Greek public, leading to protests, riots and social unrest. On 5 May 2010, a national strike was held in opposition. Nevertheless, the austerity package was approved on 29 June 2011, with 155 out of 300 members of parliament voting in favour.

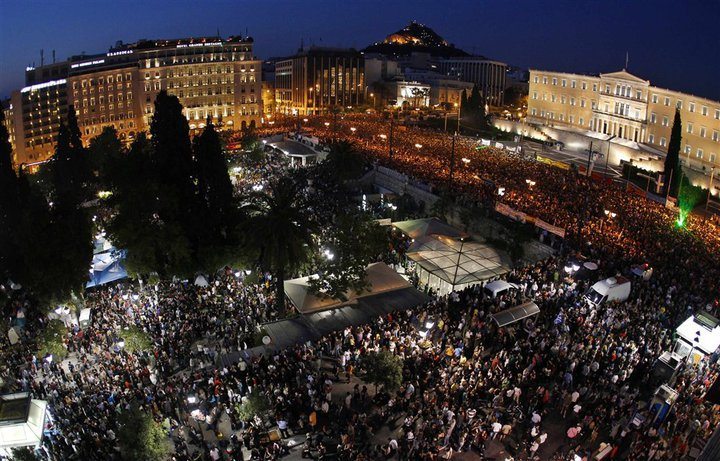
100,000 people protest against the austerity measures in front of parliament building in Athens (29 May 2011).

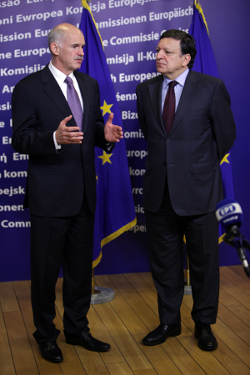
Former Prime Minister George Papandreou and former European Commission President José Manuel Barroso after their meeting in Brussels on 20 June 2011

=== Second Economic Adjustment Programme ===
At a 21 July 2011 summit in Brussels, eurozone leaders agreed to extend Greek (as well as Irish and Portuguese) loan repayment periods from 7 years to a minimum of 15 years and to cut interest rates to 3.5%. They also approved an additional €109 billion support package, with exact content to be finalized at a later summit. On 27 October 2011, eurozone leaders and the IMF settled an agreement with banks whereby they accepted a 50% write-off of (part of) Greek debt.

Greece brought down its primary deficit from €25bn (11% of GDP) in 2009 to €5bn (2.4% of GDP) in 2011. However, the Greek recession worsened. Overall 2011 Greek GDP experienced a 7.1% decline. The unemployment rate grew from 7.5% in September 2008 to an unprecedented 19.9% in November 2011.

=== Third Economic Adjustment Programme ===
The third and last Economic Adjustment Programme for Greece was signed on 12 July 2015 by the Greek Government under prime minister Alexis Tsipras and it expired on 20 August 2018.

=== Effects on the GDP compared to other eurozone countries ===
There were key differences in the effects of the Greek programme compared to those for other eurozone bailed-out countries. According to the applied programme, Greece had to accomplish by far the largest fiscal adjustment (by more than 9 points of GDP between 2010 and 2012), "a record fiscal consolidation by OECD standards ". Between 2009 and 2014 the change (improvement) in structural primary balance was 16.1 points of GDP for Greece, compared to 8.5 for Portugal, 7.3 for Spain, 7.2 for Ireland, and 5.6 for Cyprus.

The negative effects of such a rapid fiscal adjustment on the Greek GDP, and thus the scale of resulting increase of the Debt to GDP ratio, had been underestimated by the IMF, apparently due to a calculation error. Indeed, the result was a magnification of the debt problem. Even were the amount of debt to remain the same, Greece's Debt to GDP ratio of 127% in 2009 would still jump to about 170% – considered unsustainable – solely due to the drop in GDP (which fell by more than 25% between 2009 and 2014). The much larger scale of the above effects does not easily support a meaningful comparison with the performance of programmes in other bailed-out countries.

=== Bank recapitalization ===
The Hellenic Financial Stability Fund (HFSF) completed a €48.2bn bank recapitalization in June 2013, of which the first €24.4bn were injected into the four biggest Greek banks. Initially, this recapitalization was accounted for as a debt increase that elevated the debt-to-GDP ratio by 24.8 points by the end of 2012. In return for this, the government received shares in those banks, which it could later sell (per March 2012 was expected to generate €16bn of extra "privatization income" for the Greek government, to be realized during 2013–2020).

HFSF offered three out of the four big Greek banks (NBG, Alpha and Piraeus) warrants to buy back all HFSF bank shares in semi-annual exercise periods up to December 2017, at some predefined strike prices. These banks acquired additional private investor capital contribution at minimum 10% of the conducted recapitalization. However Eurobank Ergasias failed to attract private investor participation and thus became almost entirely financed/owned by HFSF. During the first warrant period, the shareholders in Alpha bank bought back the first 2.4% of HFSF shares. Shareholders in Piraeus Bank bought back the first 0.07% of HFSF shares. National Bank (NBG) shareholders bought back the first 0.01% of the HFSF shares, because the market share price was cheaper than the strike price. Shares not sold by the end of December 2017 may be sold to alternative investors.

In May 2014, a second round of bank recapitalization worth €8.3bn was concluded, financed by private investors. All six commercial banks (Alpha, Eurobank, NBG, Piraeus, Attica and Panellinia) participated. HFSF did not tap into their current €11.5bn reserve capital fund. Eurobank in the second round was able to attract private investors. This required HFSF to dilute their ownership from 95.2% to 34.7%.

According to HFSF's third quarter 2014 financial report, the fund expected to recover €27.3bn out of the initial €48.2bn. This amount included "A€0.6bn positive cash balance stemming from its previous selling of warrants (selling of recapitalization shares) and liquidation of assets, €2.8bn estimated to be recovered from liquidation of assets held by its 'bad asset bank', €10.9bn of EFSF bonds still held as capital reserve, and €13bn from its future sale of recapitalization shares in the four systemic banks." The last figure is affected by the highest amount of uncertainty, as it directly reflects the current market price of the remaining shares held in the four systemic banks (66.4% in Alpha, 35.4% in Eurobank, 57.2% in NBG, 66.9% in Piraeus), which for HFSF had a combined market value of €22.6bn by the end of 2013 – declining to €13bn on 10 December 2014.

Once HFSF liquidates its assets, the total amount of recovered capital will be returned to the Greek government to help to reduce its debt. In early December 2014, the Bank of Greece allowed HFSF to repay the first €9.3bn out of its €11.3bn reserve to the Greek government. A few months later, the remaining HFSF reserves were likewise approved for repayment to ECB, resulting in redeeming €11.4bn in notes during the first quarter of 2015.

== Creditors ==
Initially, European banks had the largest holdings of Greek debt. However, this shifted as the "troika" (ECB, IMF and a European government-sponsored fund) gradually replaced private investors as Greece's main creditor, by setting up the EFSF. As of early 2015, the largest individual contributors to the EFSF fund were Germany, France and Italy with roughly €130bn total of the €323bn debt. The IMF was owed €32bn. As of 2015, various European countries still had a substantial amount of loans extended to Greece. Separately, the European Central Bank acquired around 45 billion euros of Greek bonds through the "securities market programme" (SMP).

=== European banks ===
Excluding Greek banks, European banks had €45.8bn exposure to Greece in June 2011. However, by early 2015 their holdings had declined to roughly €2.4bn, in part due to the 50% debt write-down.

=== European Investment Bank ===
In November 2015, the European Investment Bank (EIB) lent Greece about 285 million euros. This extended the 2014 deal that EIB would lend 670 million euros. It was thought that the Greek government would invest the money on Greece's energy industries so as to ensure energy security and manage environmentally friendly projects. Werner Hoyer, the president of EIB, expected the investment to boost employment and have a positive impact on Greece's economy and environment.

=== Diverging views within the troika ===
In hindsight, while the troika shared the aim to avoid a Greek sovereign default, the approach of each member began to diverge, with the IMF on one side advocating for more debt relief while, on the other side, the EU maintained a hardline on debt repayment and strict monitoring.

== Greek public opinion ==
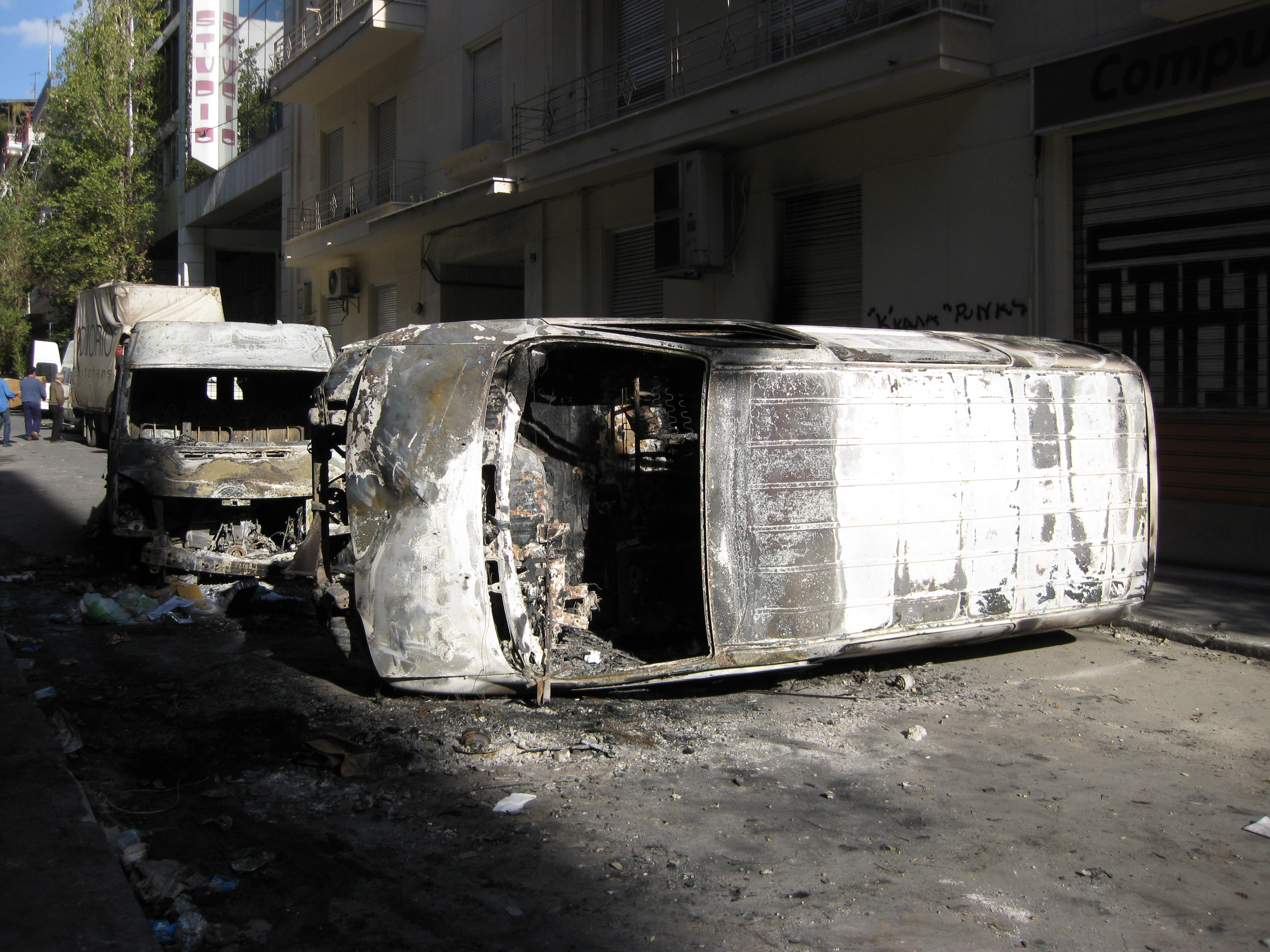
Aftermath of the 2008 riots in Athens

According to a poll in February 2012 by Public Issue and SKAI Channel, PASOK—which won the national elections of 2009 with 43.92% of the vote—had seen its approval rating decline to 8%, placing it fifth after centre-right New Democracy (31%), left-wing Democratic Left (18%), far-left Communist Party of Greece (KKE) (12.5%) and radical left Syriza (12%). The same poll suggested that Papandreou was the least popular political leader with a 9% approval rating, while 71% of Greeks did not trust him.

In a May 2011 poll, 62% of respondents felt that the IMF memorandum that Greece signed in 2010 was a bad decision that hurt the country, while 80% had no faith in the Minister of Finance, Giorgos Papakonstantinou, to handle the crisis. (Venizelos replaced Papakonstantinou on 17 June). 75% of those polled had a negative image of the IMF, while 65% felt it was hurting Greece's economy. 64% felt that sovereign default was likely. When asked about their fears for the near future, Greeks highlighted unemployment (97%), poverty (93%) and the closure of businesses (92%).

Polls showed that the vast majority of Greeks are not in favour of leaving the eurozone. Nonetheless, other 2012 polls showed that almost half (48%) of Greeks were in favour of default, in contrast with a minority (38%) who are not.

== Economic, social and political effects ==
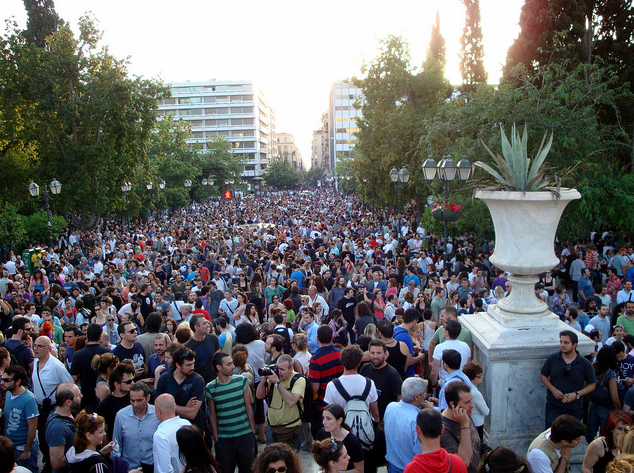
Protests in Athens on 25 May 2011

=== Economic effects ===
Greek GDP's worst decline, −6.9%, came in 2011, a year in which seasonally adjusted industrial output ended 28.4% lower than in 2005. During that year, 111,000 Greek companies went bankrupt (27% higher than in 2010). As a result, the seasonally adjusted unemployment rate grew from 7.5% in September 2008 to a then record high of 23.1% in May 2012, while the youth unemployment rate time rose from 22.0% to 54.9%.

From 2009 to 2012, the Greek GDP declined by more than a quarter, causing a "depression dynamic" in the country.

Key statistics are summarized below, with a detailed table at the bottom of the article. According to the CIA World Factbook and Eurostat:

- Greek GDP fell from €242 billion in 2008 to €179 billion in 2014, a 26% decline. Greece was in recession for over five years, emerging in 2014 by some measures. This fall in GDP dramatically increased the Debt to GDP ratio, severely worsening Greece's debt crisis.
- GDP per capita fell from a peak of €22,500 in 2007 to €17,000 in 2014, a 24% decline.
- The public debt to GDP ratio in 2014 was 177% of GDP or €317 billion. This ratio was the world's third highest after Japan and Zimbabwe. Public debt peaked at €356 billion in 2011; it was reduced by a bailout program to €305 billion in 2012 and then rose slightly.
- The annual budget deficit (expenses over revenues) was 3.4% GDP in 2014, much improved versus the 15% of 2009.
- Tax revenues for 2014 were €86 billion (about 48% GDP), while expenditures were €89.5 billion (about 50% GDP).
- The unemployment rate rose from below 10% (2005–2009) to around 25% (2014–2015).
- An estimated 36% of Greeks lived below the poverty line in 2014.

Greece defaulted on a $1.7 billion IMF payment on 29 June 2015; the payment was made with a 20-day delay. The government had requested a two-year bailout from lenders for roughly $30 billion, its third in six years, but did not receive it.

The IMF reported on 2 July 2015 that the "debt dynamics" of Greece were "unsustainable" due to its already high debt level and "...significant changes in policies since [2014]—not least, lower primary surpluses and a weak reform effort that will weigh on growth and privatization—[which] are leading to substantial new financing needs." The report stated that debt reduction (haircuts, in which creditors sustain losses through debt principal reduction) would be required if the package of reforms under consideration were weakened further.

=== Taxation ===
In response to the crisis, the Greek governments resolved to raise the tax rates dramatically. A study showed that indirect taxes were almost doubled between the beginning of the Crisis and 2017. This crisis-induced system of high taxation has been described as "unfair", "complicated", "unstable" and, as a result, "encouraging tax evasion". The tax rates of Greece have been compared to those of Scandinavian countries, but without the same reciprocity, as Greece lacks the welfare state infrastructures.

As of 2016, five indirect taxes had been added to goods and services. At 23%, the value added tax is one of the eurozone's highest, exceeding other EU countries on small and medium-sized enterprises. One researcher found that the poorest households faced tax increases of 337%.

The ensuing tax policies are accused for having the opposite effects than intended, namely reducing instead of increasing the revenues, as high taxation discourages transactions and encourages tax evasion, thus perpetuating the depression. Some firms relocated abroad to avoid the country's higher tax rates.

Greece not only has some of the highest taxes in Europe, it also has major problems in terms of tax collection. The VAT deficit due to tax evasion was estimated at 34% in early 2017. Tax debts in Greece are now equal to 90% of annual tax revenue, which is the worst number in all industrialized nations. Much of this is due to the fact that Greece has a vast underground economy, which was estimated to be about the size of a quarter of the country's GDP before the crisis. The International Monetary Fund therefore argued in 2015 that Greece's debt crisis could be almost completely resolved if the country's government found a way to solve the tax evasion problem.

==== Tax evasion and avoidance ====
A mid-2017 report indicated Greeks have been "taxed to the hilt" and many believed that the risk of penalties for tax evasion were less serious than the risk of bankruptcy. A more recent study showed that many Greeks consider tax evasion a legitimate means of defense against the government's policies of austerity and over-taxation. As an example, many Greek couples in 2017 resolved to "virtual" divorces hoping to pay lower income and property taxes.

By 2010, tax receipts consistently were below the expected level. In 2010, estimated tax evasion losses for the Greek government amounted to over $20 billion. 2013 figures showed that the government collected less than half of the revenues due in 2012, with the remaining tax to be paid according to a delayed payment schedule.

Data for 2012 placed the Greek underground or "black" economy at 24.3% of GDP, compared with 28.6% for Estonia, 26.5% for Latvia, 21.6% for Italy, 17.1% for Belgium, 14.7% for Sweden, 13.7% for Finland, and 13.5% for Germany.

A January 2017 report by the DiaNEOsis think-tank indicated that unpaid taxes in Greece at the time totaled approximately 95 billion euros, up from 76 billion euros in 2015, much of it was expected to be uncollectable. Another early 2017 study estimated that the loss to the government as a result of tax evasion was between 6% and 9% of the country's GDP, or roughly between 11 billion and 16 billion euros per annum.

One method of evasion is the so-called black market, grey economy or shadow economy: work is done for cash payment which is not declared as income; as well, VAT is not collected and remitted. The shortfall in the collection of VAT (sales tax) is also significant. In 2014, the government collected 28% less than was owed to it; this shortfall is about double the average for the EU. The uncollected amount that year was about 4.9 billion euros. The DiaNEOsis study estimated that 3.5% of GDP is lost due to VAT fraud, while losses due to smuggling of alcohol, tobacco and petrol amounted to approximately another 0.5% of the country's GDP.

=== Social effects ===
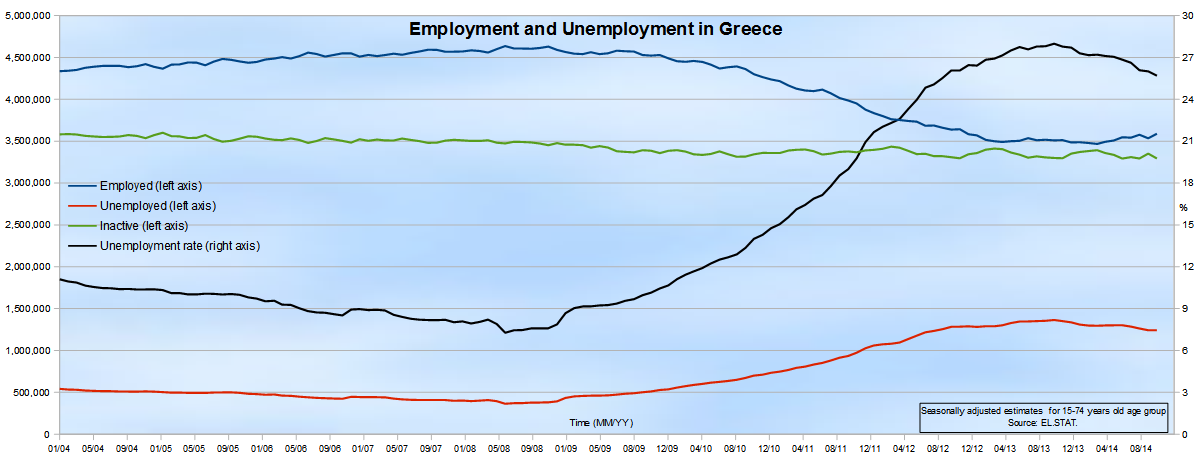
Employment and unemployment in Greece from 2004 to 2014

The social effects of the austerity measures on the Greek population were severe. In February 2012, it was reported that 20,000 Greeks had been made homeless during the preceding year, and that 20 per cent of shops in the historic city centre of Athens were empty.

By 2015, the OECD reported that nearly twenty percent of Greeks lacked funds to meet daily food expenses. Consequently, because of financial shock, unemployment directly affects debt management, isolation, and unhealthy coping mechanisms such as depression, suicide, and addiction. In particular, as for the number who reported having attempted suicide, there was an increased suicidality amid economic crisis in Greece, an increase of 36% from 2009 to 2011. As the economy contracted and the welfare state declined, traditionally strong Greek families came under increasing strain, attempting to cope with increasing unemployment and homeless relatives. Many unemployed Greeks cycled between friends and family members until they ran out of options and ended up in homeless shelters. These homeless had extensive work histories and were largely free of mental health and substance abuse concerns.

The Greek government was unable to commit the necessary resources to homelessness, due in part to austerity measures. A program was launched to provide a subsidy to assist homeless to return to their homes, but many enrollees never received grants. Various attempts were made by local governments and non-governmental agencies to alleviate the problem. The non-profit street newspaper Schedia (Greek: Σχεδία, "Raft"), that is sold by street vendors in Athens attracted many homeless to sell the paper. Athens opened its own shelters, the first of which was called the Hotel Ionis. In 2015, the Venetis bakery chain in Athens gave away ten thousand loaves of bread a day, one-third of its production. In some of the poorest neighborhoods, according to the chain's general manager, "In the third round of austerity measures, which is beginning now, it is certain that in Greece there will be no consumers – there will be only beggars."

In a study by Eurostat, it was found that 1 in 3 Greek citizens lived under poverty conditions in 2016.

=== Political effects ===
The economic and social crisis had profound political effects. In 2011, it gave rise to the anti-austerity Movement of the Indignant in Syntagma Square. The two-party system which dominated Greek politics from 1977 to 2009 crumbled in the double elections of 6 May and 17 June 2012. The main features of this transformation were:

a) The crisis of the two main parties, the center-right New Democracy (ND) and center-left PASOK. ND saw its share of the vote drop from an historical average of >40% to a record low of 19–33% in 2009–2019. PASOK collapsed from 44% in 2009 to 13% in June 2012 and stabilized around 8% in the 2019 elections. Meanwhile, Syriza emerged as the main rival of ND, with a share of the vote that rose from 4% to 27% between 2009 and June 2012. This peaked in the elections of 25 January 2015 when Syriza received 36% of the vote and fell to 31.5% in the 7 July 2019 elections.

b) The sharp rise of the Neo-Nazi Golden Dawn, whose share of the vote increased from 0.29% in 2009 to 7% in May and June 2012. In 2012–19, Golden Dawn was the third largest party in the Greek Parliament.

c) A general fragmentation of the popular vote. The average number of parties represented in the Greek Parliament in 1977–2012 was between 4 and 5. In 2012–19, this increased to 7 or 8 parties.

d) From 1974 to 2011, Greece was ruled by single-party governments, except for a brief period in 1989–90. In 2011–19, the country was ruled by two- or three-party coalitions.

The victory of ND in the 7 July 2019 elections with 40% of the vote and the formation of the first one-party government in Greece since 2011 could be the beginning of a new functioning two-party system. However, the significantly weaker performance of Syriza and PASOK's endurance as a competing centre-left party could signal continued party system fluidity.

=== Other effects ===
Horse racing has ceased operation due to the liquidation of the conducting organization.

Paid soccer players will receive their salary with new tax rates.

== Responses ==
=== Electronic payments to reduce tax evasion ===
In 2016 and 2017, the government was encouraging the use of credit card or debit cards to pay for goods and services in order to reduce cash only payments. By January 2017, taxpayers were only granted tax-allowances or deductions when payments were made electronically, with a "paper trail" of the transactions. This was expected to reduce the opportunity by vendors to avoid the payment of VAT (sales) tax and income tax.

By 28 July 2017, numerous businesses were required by law to install a point of sale device to enable them to accept payment by credit or debit card. Failure to comply with the electronic payment facility can lead to fines of up to 1,500 euros. The requirement applied to around 400,000 firms or individuals in 85 professions. The greater use of cards was one of the factors that had already achieved significant increases in VAT collection in 2016.

=== Grexit ===
Paul Krugman suggested that the Greek economy could recover from the recession by exiting the eurozone ("Grexit") and returning to its national currency, the drachma. That would restore Greece's control over its monetary policy, allowing it to navigate the trade-offs between inflation and growth on a national basis, rather than the entire eurozone. Iceland made a dramatic recovery following the default of its commercial banking system in 2008, in part due to the devaluing of the krona (ISK). In 2013, it enjoyed an economic growth rate of some 3.3 percent. Canada was able to improve its budget position in the 1990s by devaluing its currency.

However, the consequences of "Grexit" could be global and severe, including:

- Membership in the eurozone would no longer be perceived as irrevocable. Other countries might be seen by financial markets as being at risk of leaving. These countries might see interest rates rise on their bonds, complicating debt service.
- Geopolitical shifts, such as closer relations between Greece and Russia, as the crisis soured relations with Europe.
- Significant financial losses for eurozone countries and the IMF, which are owed the majority of Greece's roughly €300 billion national debt.
- Adverse impact on the IMF and the credibility of its austerity strategy.
- Loss of Greek access to global capital markets and the collapse of its banking system.

=== Bailout ===
Greece could accept additional bailout funds and debt relief (i.e. bondholder haircuts or principal reductions) in exchange for greater austerity. However, austerity has damaged the economy, deflating wages, destroying jobs and reducing tax receipts, thus making it even harder to pay its debts. If further austerity were accompanied by enough reduction in the debt balance owed, the cost might be justifiable.

=== European debt conference ===
Economist Thomas Piketty said in July 2015: "We need a conference on all of Europe's debts, just like after World War II. A restructuring of all debt, not just in Greece but in several European countries, is inevitable." This reflected the difficulties that Spain, Portugal, Italy and Ireland had faced (along with Greece) before ECB-head Mario Draghi signaled a pivot to looser monetary policy. Piketty noted that Germany received significant debt relief after World War II. He warned that: "If we start kicking states out, then....Financial markets will immediately turn on the next country."

== Germany's role in Greece ==
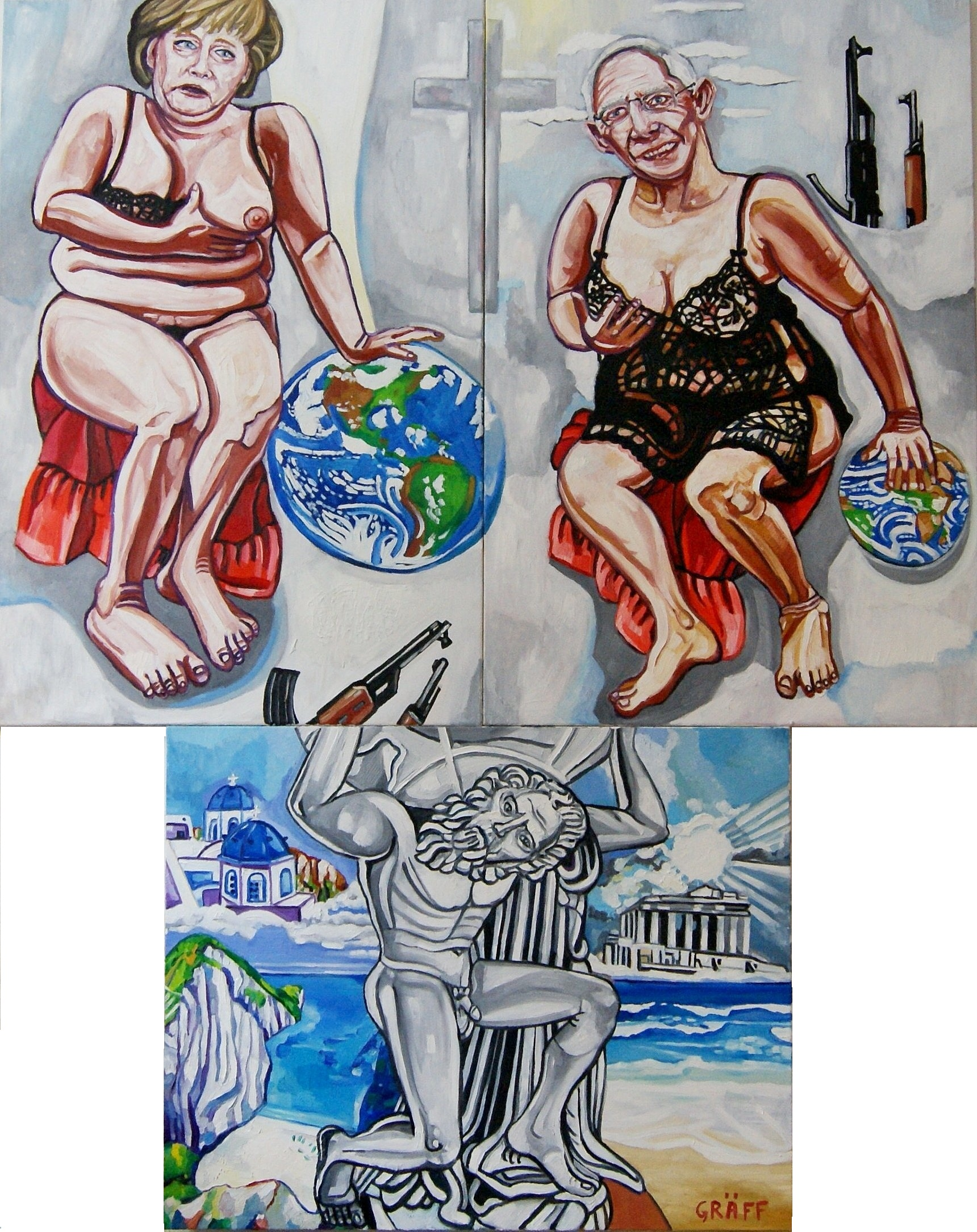
Triptych "Der griechische Altar. Merkel und Schäuble als falsche Caritas" depicts Germany's perceived role during the crisis; painting from Matthias Laurenz Gräff (2015)

So what, in brief, is happening? The answers are: creeping onset of deflation; mass joblessness; thwarted internal rebalancing and over-reliance on external demand. Yet all this is regarded as acceptable, desirable, even moral—indeed, a success. Why? The explanation is myths: the crisis was due to fiscal malfeasance instead of to irresponsible cross-border credit flows; fiscal policy has no role in managing demand; central bank purchases of government bonds are a step towards hyperinflation; and competitiveness determines external surpluses, not the balance between supply and insufficient demand.

— "Germany is a weight on the world"
Martin Wolf, 5 November 2013

Germany has played a major role in discussion concerning Greece's debt crisis. A key issue has been the benefits it enjoyed through the crisis, including falling borrowing rates (as Germany, along with other strong Western economies, was seen as a safe haven by investors during the crisis), investment influx, and exports boost thanks to Euro's depreciation (with profits that may have reached 100bn Euros, according to some estimates), as well as other profits made through loans. Critics have also accused the German government of hypocrisy; of pursuing its own national interests via an unwillingness to adjust fiscal policy in a way that would help resolve the eurozone crisis; of using the ECB to serve their country's national interests; and have criticised the nature of the austerity and debt-relief programme Greece has followed as part of the conditions attached to its bailouts.

=== Charges of hypocrisy ===
Hypocrisy has been alleged on multiple bases. "Germany is coming across like a know-it-all in the debate over aid for Greece", commented Der Spiegel, while its own government did not achieve a budget surplus during the era of 1970 to 2011, although a budget surplus indeed was achieved by Germany in all three subsequent years (2012–2014) – with a spokesman for the governing CDU party commenting that "Germany is leading by example in the eurozone – only spending money in its coffers". A Bloomberg editorial, which also concluded that "Europe's taxpayers have provided as much financial support to Germany as they have to Greece", described the German role and posture in the Greek crisis thus:

In the millions of words written about Europe's debt crisis, Germany is typically cast as the responsible adult and Greece as the profligate child. Prudent Germany, the narrative goes, is loath to bail out freeloading Greece, which borrowed more than it could afford and now must suffer the consequences. [...] By December 2009, according to the Bank for International Settlements, German banks had amassed claims of $704 billion on Greece, Ireland, Italy, Portugal and Spain, much more than the German banks' aggregate capital. In other words, they lent more than they could afford. [… I]rresponsible borrowers can't exist without irresponsible lenders. Germany's banks were Greece's enablers.

German economic historian Albrecht Ritschl describes his country as "king when it comes to debt. Calculated based on the amount of losses compared to economic performance, Germany was the biggest debt transgressor of the 20th century." Despite calling for the Greeks to adhere to fiscal responsibility, and although Germany's tax revenues are at a record high, with the interest it has to pay on new debt at close to zero, Germany still missed its own cost-cutting targets in 2011 and is also falling behind on its goals for 2012.

Allegations of hypocrisy could be made towards both sides: Germany complains of Greek corruption, yet the arms sales meant that the trade with Greece became synonymous with high-level bribery and corruption; former defence minister Akis Tsochadzopoulos was jailed in April 2012 ahead of his trial on charges of accepting an €8m bribe from Germany company Ferrostaal.

=== Pursuit of national self-interest ===
"The counterpart to Germany living within its means is that others are living beyond their means", according to Philip Whyte, senior research fellow at the Centre for European Reform. "So if Germany is worried about the fact that other countries are sinking further into debt, it should be worried about the size of its trade surpluses, but it isn't."

OECD projections of relative export prices—a measure of competitiveness—showed Germany beating all eurozone members except for crisis-hit Spain and Ireland for 2012, with the lead only widening in subsequent years. A study by the Carnegie Endowment for International Peace in 2010 noted that "Germany, now poised to derive the greatest gains from the euro's crisis-triggered decline, should boost its domestic demand" to help the periphery recover. In March 2012, Bernhard Speyer of Deutsche Bank reiterated: "If the eurozone is to adjust, southern countries must be able to run trade surpluses, and that means somebody else must run deficits. One way to do that is to allow higher inflation in Germany but I don't see any willingness in the German government to tolerate that, or to accept a current account deficit." According to a research paper by Credit Suisse, "Solving the periphery economic imbalances does not only rest on the periphery countries' shoulders even if these countries have been asked to bear most of the burden. Part of the effort to re-balance Europe also has to been borne [sic] by Germany via its current account." At the end of May 2012, the European Commission warned that an "orderly unwinding of intra-euro area macroeconomic imbalances is crucial for sustainable growth and stability in the euro area," and suggested Germany should "contribute to rebalancing by removing unnecessary regulatory and other constraints on domestic demand". In July 2012, the IMF added its call for higher wages and prices in Germany, and for reform of parts of the country's economy to encourage more spending by its consumers.

Paul Krugman estimates that Spain and other peripherals need to reduce their price levels relative to Germany by around 20 percent to become competitive again:

If Germany had 4 percent inflation, they could do that over 5 years with stable prices in the periphery—which would imply an overall eurozone inflation rate of something like 3 percent. But if Germany is going to have only 1 percent inflation, we're talking about massive deflation in the periphery, which is both hard (probably impossible) as a macroeconomic proposition, and would greatly magnify the debt burden. This is a recipe for failure, and collapse.

The US has also repeatedly asked Germany to loosen fiscal policy at G7 meetings, but the Germans have repeatedly refused.

Even with such policies, Greece and other countries would face years of hard times, but at least there would be some hope of recovery. EU employment chief Laszlo Andor called for a radical change in EU crisis strategy and criticised what he described as the German practice of "wage dumping" within the eurozone to gain larger export surpluses.

With regard to structural reforms required from countries at the periphery, Simon Evenett stated in 2013: "Many promoters of structural reform are honest enough to acknowledge that it generates short-term pain. (...) If you've been in a job where it is hard to be fired, labour market reform introduces insecurity, and you might be tempted to save more now there's a greater prospect of unemployment. Economy-wide labour reform might induce consumer spending cuts, adding another drag on a weakened economy." Paul Krugman opposed structural reforms in accordance with his view of the task of improving the macroeconomic situation being "the responsibility of Germany and the ECB."

Claims that Germany had, by mid-2012, given Greece the equivalent of 29 times the aid given to West Germany under the Marshall Plan after World War II have been contested, with opponents claiming that aid was just a small part of Marshall Plan assistance to Germany and conflating the writing off of a majority of Germany's debt with the Marshall Plan.

The version of adjustment offered by Germany and its allies is that austerity will lead to an internal devaluation, i.e. deflation, which would enable Greece gradually to regain competitiveness. This view too has been contested. A February 2013 research note by the Economics Research team at Goldman Sachs claims that the years of recession being endured by Greece "exacerbate the fiscal difficulties as the denominator of the debt-to-GDP ratio diminishes".

Strictly in terms of reducing wages relative to Germany, Greece had been making progress: private-sector wages fell 5.4% in the third quarter of 2011 from a year earlier and 12% since their peak in the first quarter of 2010. The second economic adjustment programme for Greece called for a further labour cost reduction in the private sector of 15% during 2012–2014.

In contrast Germany's unemployment continued its downward trend to record lows in March 2012, and yields on its government bonds fell to repeat record lows in the first half of 2012 (though real interest rates are actually negative).

All of this has resulted in increased anti-German sentiment within peripheral countries like Greece and Spain.

When Horst Reichenbach arrived in Athens towards the end of 2011 to head a new European Union task force, the Greek media instantly dubbed him "Third Reichenbach". Almost four million German tourists—more than any other EU country—visit Greece annually, but they comprised most of the 50,000 cancelled bookings in the ten days after 6 May 2012 Greek elections, a figure The Observer called "extraordinary". The Association of Greek Tourism Enterprises estimates that German visits for 2012 will decrease by about 25%. Such is the ill-feeling, historic claims on Germany from WWII have been reopened, including "a huge, never-repaid loan the nation was forced to make under Nazi occupation from 1941 to 1945."

Perhaps to curb some of the popular reactions, Germany and the eurozone members approve the 2019 budget of Greece, which called for no further pension cuts, in spite of the fact that these were agreed under the third memorandum.

== Effect of applied programmes on the debt crisis ==
Greece's GDP dropped by 25%, connected with the bailout programmes. This had a critical effect: the debt-to-GDP ratio, the key factor defining the severity of the crisis, would jump from its 2009 level of 127% to about 170%, solely due to the GDP drop (for the same debt). Such a level is considered most probably unsustainable. In a 2013 report, the IMF admitted that it had underestimated the effects of such extensive tax hikes and budget cuts on the country's GDP and issued an informal apology.

The Greek programmes imposed a very rapid improvement in structural primary balance, at least two times faster than in Ireland, Portugal and Cyprus. The results of these policies, which worsened the debt crisis, are often cited, while Greece's president, Prokopis Pavlopoulos, has stressed the creditors' share in responsibility for the depth of the crisis. Alexis Tsipras spoke to Bloomberg about errors in the design of the first two programmes which he alleged that, by imposing too much austerity, lead to a loss of 25% of the Greek GDP.

== Criticism of the role of news media and stereotyping ==
A large number of negative articles about the Greek economy and society have been published in international media before and during the crisis, leading to accusations about negative stereotyping and possible effects on the evolution of the crisis itself.

Elements contradicting several negative reports include the facts that Greeks even before the crisis worked the hardest in the EU, took fewer vacation days and on average retired at about the same age as the Germans, Greece's private and households debt-to-GDP ratio was one of the lowest in the EU, while its government expenditure as a percentage of GDP was at the EU average. Similarly, negative reports about the Greek economy rarely mentioned the previous decades of Greece's high economic growth rates combined with low government debt.

== Economic statistics ==
Greek government budget balance, GDP growth and debt-to-GDP ratio (1970–2017) Source: Eurostat and European Commission
Greek national account	1970	1980	1990	1995	1996	1997	1998	1999	2000	2001^{a}	2002	2003	2004	2005	2006	2007	2008	2009	2010	2011	2012	2013	2014	2015^{b}	2016^{b}	2017^{c}
Public revenue^{d} (% of GDP)	—N/a	—N/a	31.0^{d}	37.0^{d}	37.8^{d}	39.3^{d}	40.9^{d}	41.8^{d}	43.4^{d}	41.3^{d}	40.6^{d}	39.4^{d}	38.4^{d}	39.0^{d}	38.7	40.2	40.6	38.7	41.1	43.8	45.7	47.8	45.8	48.1	45.8	TBA
Public expenditure^{d} (% of GDP)	—N/a	—N/a	45.2^{d}	46.2^{d}	44.5^{d}	45.3^{d}	44.7^{d}	44.8^{d}	47.1^{d}	45.8^{d}	45.5^{d}	45.1^{d}	46.0^{d}	44.4^{d}	44.9	46.9	50.6	54.0	52.2	54.0	54.4	60.1	49.3	50.2	47.9	TBA
Budget balance^{d} (% of GDP)	—N/a	—N/a	-14.2^{d}	-9.1^{d}	-6.7^{d}	-5.9^{d}	-3.9^{d}	-3.1^{d}	-3.7^{d}	-4.5^{d}	-4.9^{d}	-5.7^{d}	-7.6^{d}	-5.5^{d}	-6.1	-6.7	-9.9	-15.3	-11.1	-10.2	-8.7	-12.3	-3.5	-2.1	-2.2	TBA
Structural balance^{e} (% of GDP)	—N/a	—N/a	−14.9^{f}	−9.4^{g}	−6.9^{g}	−6.3^{g}	−4.4^{g}	−3.6^{g}	−4.2^{g}	−4.9^{g}	−4.5^{g}	−5.7^{h}	−7.7^{h}	−5.2^{h}	−7.4^{h}	−7.8^{h}	−9.7^{h}	−14.7^{h}	−9.8	−6.3	-0.6	2.2	0.4	-1.4	-2.3	TBA
Nominal GDP growth (%)	13.1	20.1	20.7	12.1	10.8	10.9	9.5	6.8	5.6	7.2	6.8	10.0	8.1	3.2	9.4	6.9	4.0	−1.9	−4.7	−8.2	−6.5	−6.1	−1.8	-0.7	3.6	TBA
GDP price deflator^{i} (%)	3.8	19.3	20.7	9.8	7.7	6.2	5.2	3.6	1.6	3.4	3.5	3.2	3.0	2.3	3.4	3.2	4.4	2.6	0.8	0.8	0.1	−2.3	−2.6	-1.2	0.7	TBA
Real GDP growth^{j} (%)	8.9	0.7	0.0	2.1	3.0	4.5	4.1	3.1	4.0	3.7	3.2	6.6	5.0	0.9	5.8	3.5	−0.4	−4.4	−5.4	−8.9	−6.6	−3.9	0.8	0.5	2.9	TBA
Public debt^{k} (billion €)	0.2	1.5	31.2	87.0	98.0	105.4	112.1	118.8	141.2	152.1	159.5	168.3	183.5	212.8	225.3	240.0	264.6	301.0	330.3	356.0	304.7	319.2	317.1	320.4	319.6	TBA
Nominal GDP^{k} (billion €)	1.2	7.1	45.7	93.4	103.5	114.8	125.7	134.2	141.7	152.0	162.3	178.6	193.0	199.2	217.8	232.8	242.1	237.4	226.2	207.8	194.2	182.4	179.1	177.8	184.3	TBA
Debt-to-GDP ratio (%)	17.2	21.0	68.3	93.1	94.7	91.8	89.2	88.5	99.6	100.1	98.3	94.2	95.1	106.9	103.4	103.1	109.3	126.8	146.0	171.4	156.9	175.0	177.1	180.2	173.4	TBA
Impact of Nominal GDP growth (%)	−2.3	−3.7	−10.6	−10.0	−9.1	−9.3	−7.9	−5.7	−4.7	−6.7	−6.3	−9.0	−7.1	−2.9	−9.2	−6.7	−3.9	2.1	6.3	13.0	12.0	10.1	3.3	1.3	−6.3	TBA
Stock-flow adjustment (%)	N/A	N/A	2.9	1.5	3.9	0.5	1.4	1.9	12.1	2.7	−0.3	−0.8	0.3	9.2	−0.4	−0.4	0.3	0.0	1.9	2.1	−35.1	−4.4	−4.7	−0.2	−2.6	TBA
Impact of budget balance (%)	N/A	N/A	14.2	9.1	6.7	5.9	3.9	3.1	3.7	4.5	4.9	5.7	7.6	5.5	6.1	6.7	9.9	15.3	11.1	10.2	8.7	12.3	3.5	2.1	2.2	TBA
Overall yearly ratio change (%)	−2.3	−0.9	6.5	0.6	1.5	−2.9	−2.6	−0.7	11.1	0.4	−1.8	−4.0	0.8	11.8	−3.4	−0.4	6.2	17.5	19.2	25.3	−14.5	18.1	2.1	3.1	−6.8	TBA
Notes: ^{a} Year of entry into the Eurozone. ^{b} Forecasts by European Commission pr 5 May 2015. ^{c} Forecasts by the bailout plan in April 2014.^{d} Calculated by ESA-2010 EDP method, except data for 1990–2005 only being calculated by the old ESA-1995 EDP method.^{e} Structural balance = "Cyclically-adjusted balance" minus impact from "one-off and temporary measures" (according to ESA-2010).^{f} Data for 1990 is not the "structural balance", but only the "Cyclically-adjusted balance" (according to ESA-1979).^{g} Data for 1995–2002 is not the "structural balance", but only the "Cyclically-adjusted balance" (according to ESA-1995).^{h} Data for 2003–2009 represents the "structural balance", but are so far only calculated by the old ESA-1995 method.^{i} Calculated as yoy %-change of the GDP deflator index in National Currency (weighted to match the GDP composition of 2005).^{j} Calculated as yoy %-change of 2010 constant GDP in National Currency.^{k} Figures prior of 2001 were all converted retrospectively from drachma to euro by the fixed euro exchange rate in 2000.

== See also ==
- 1999 Greek stock market crash
- Currency crisis
- Euro area crisis
- The role of the Institute of International Finance in the Greek debt crisis
- Japonica Partner's Greek bond trade
- List of acronyms associated with the eurozone crisis
- List of countries by external debt
- List of countries by net international investment position per capita
- Puerto Rican government-debt crisis
- Vulture fund

=== Analogous events ===
- 1997 Asian financial crisis
- 1998 Russian financial crisis
- 1998–2002 Argentine great depression
- Latin American debt crisis
- South American economic crisis of 2002
- 2008–2009 Belgian financial crisis
- 2008–2014 Spanish financial crisis
- 2010–2014 Portuguese financial crisis

=== Film about the debt ===
- Debtocracy

== Bibliography ==
- Karyotis, Georgios; Gerodimos, Roman (2015), The Politics of Extreme Austerity: Greece in the Eurozone Crisis, Basingstoke: Palgrave Macmillan, ISBN 978-1-137-36922-2
- Blustein, Paul (7 April 2015), Laid Low: The IMF, the Euro Zone and the First Rescue of Greece (PDF), CIGI Papers Series, CIGI.
- Orphanides, Athanasios (19 October 2015), The Euro Area Crisis Five Years After the Original Sin, MIT Sloan Research Paper, MIT Sloan School of Management, doi:10.2139/ssrn.2676103, hdl:10419/293767, S2CID 155246890, SSRN 2676103.
- Schadler, Susan (October 2013), Unsustainable debt and political economy of lending; constraining the IMF's role in sovereign debt crises (PDF), CIGI Papers Series, CIGI.
- Dalakoglou, Dimitris (2012). "The crisis before the crisis". Social Justice. 39 (1): 24–42.
- Dalakoglou, Dimitris (2014). Crisis-scapes: Athens and Beyond. Athens, Brighton: ESRC. ISBN 978-1-938660-15-3.
- Janssen, Ronald (July 2010). "Greece and the IMF: Who Exactly is Being Saved?" (PDF). Washington, DC: CEPR.
- Pasiouras, Fotios (2012). Greek Banking: From the Pre-Euro Reforms to the Financial Crisis and Beyond. Basingstoke: Palgrave Macmillan. doi:10.1057/9781137271570. ISBN 978-0-230-35608-5.
- Hyppolite, Paul-Adrien (May 2016), Towards a Theory on the Causes of the Greek Depression: An Investigation of National Balance Sheet Data (1997–2014) (PDF), ELIAMEP: Crisis Observatory.
- Takagi, Shinji (8 July 2016), The IMF and the Crises in Greece, Ireland, and Portugal: An Evaluation by the Independent Evaluation Office (PDF), Independent Evaluation Office of the International Monetary Fund.
- Kazamias, Alexander (2018). "The Political Effects of the Greek Economic Crisis: The Collapse of the Old Party System", in Vassilis Fouskas and Costas Dimoulas (eds), Greece in the 21st Century: The Politics and Economics of a Crisis. London: Routledge. pp. 163–186. ISBN 9781857438673.
- Reinhart, Carmen M.; Trebesch, Christoph (2015), The pitfalls of external dependence: Greece, 1829-2015 (PDF), Brookings Papers on Economic Activity.
- Baldwin, Richard; Giavazzi, Francesco, eds. (7 September 2015), The Eurozone Crisis: A Consensus View of the Causes and a Few Possible Solutions, VoxEU, CEPR Press, archived from the original on 11 September 2015.
- Albanese Ginammi Alessandro, Conte Giampaolo, Greek Bailouts in Historical Perspective: Comparative Case Studies, 1893 and 2010|The Journal of European Economic History, 2 2016
