= List of delegates of the 2nd Comintern congress =

Following is a list of delegates at the 2nd Comintern World Congress, held in Petrograd and Moscow from 19 July through 7 August 1920.

== Full delegates ==
- Armenia: Communist Party of Armenia
  - Avis
  - Nseratjan
- Austria: Communist Party of Austria
  - Reisler
  - Karl Steinhardt
  - Anna Strömer
  - Karl Toman
- Azerbaijan: Communist Party of Azerbaijan
  - Sapunov
- Belgium: Young Socialist Guard
  - Eduard Van Overstraeten
- Bulgaria: Communist Party of Bulgaria
  - Khristo Kabakchiev
  - Nikola Maximov
  - N. Shablin (Ivan Nedelkov)
- Czechoslovakia: Union of Communist Groups
  - Ivan Olbracht
- Czechoslovakia: National Confederation of Labor
  - Břetislav Hůla
- Czechoslovakia: Left Wing of the Social Democratic Party
  - Miloš Vaněk
  - Antonín Zápotocký
- Denmark: Communist Party of Denmark
  - Marie-Sophie Nielsen
- Denmark: Left Socialist Party
  - Jörgensen
- East Galicia/Bukovina: Communist Party of Galicia and Bukovina
  - Baral
  - Levitsky
  - Mitra
- Estonia: Communist Party of Estonia
  - Hans Pöögelmann
  - Rudolf Vakmann
- Finland: Communist Party of Finland
  - Otto Ville Kuusinen
  - Lauri Letonmäki
  - Johan Henrik Lumivuokko
  - Kullervo Manner
  - Jukka Rahja
- France: Committee for the Third International
  - Raymond Lefebvre
  - S. Mineff (Vanini)
  - Alfred Rosmer
- France: Socialist Party of France
  - Henri Guilbeaux
  - Jacques Sadoul
- Georgia: Communist Party of Georgia
  - Filipp Makharadze
  - Mikadze
  - Mikha-Tschakhaya (Barsov)
  - Silvestr Todriya
  - Wakashidze
  - Wardunjan
- Germany: Communist Party of Germany
  - Willi Budich
  - Paul Levi
  - Ernst Meyer
  - Jakob Walcher
  - Rosi Wolfstein
- Germany: Communist Youth
  - Leinhardt
- Great Britain: British Socialist Party
  - William McLaine
  - Tom Quelch
- Great Britain: Industrial Workers of the World
  - Richard Beech
- Great Britain: Shop Stewards Movement
  - Willie Gallacher
  - J. T. Murphy
  - David Ramsay
  - Jack Tanner
- Hungary: Communist Party of Hungary
  - Mátyás Rákosi
  - Endre Rudnyansky
  - Eugen Varga
- India: (no party affiliation)
  - Abani Mukherji
- Indonesia: Communist Party of Indonesia
  - Henk Sneevliet "Maring"
  - Tan Malaka
- Ireland: Communist Party of Ireland
  - "Z"
  - "NN"
  - "X"
- Ireland: Industrial Workers of the World
  - Roddy Connolly ("N")
- Ireland: Irish Labour Party
  - Patrick Quinlan ("Y")
- Italy: Socialist Party of Italy
  - Nicola Bombacci
  - Antonio Graziadei
  - Luigi Polano
  - Giacinto Menotti Serrati
- Korea: Socialist Party of Korea
  - Pak Chin-sun
- Latvia: Communist Party of Latvia
  - Dāvids Beika
  - Blank-Berg
  - K. Krastiņš
  - Pēteris Stučka
- Lithuania: Communist Party of Lithuania
  - Vincas Mickevičius-Kapsukas
  - Rasikas
- Mexico: Communist Party of Mexico
  - M.N. Roy
  - Charles Shipman ("Frank Seaman")
- Netherlands: Communist Party of Holland
  - Jan Proost Jansen
  - David Wijnkoop
- Norway:
  - Kristian Kristensen (A)
  - Einar Gerhardsen (NSU)
  - Jakob Friis (A)
  - Sverre Krogh (NSU)
  - Haavard Langseth (A)
  - Alfred Madsen (LO)
  - Hans Medby (NSU)
  - Augusta Aasen (A) – died during the Congress
  - Olav Scheflo (A)
  - Sigrid Syvertsen (A)
- Persia: Communist Party of Persia
  - Avatis Soltanzadeh
- Poland: Communist Party of Poland
  - Julian Marchlewski (Karski)
- Russia: Russian Communist Party (Bolsheviks)
  - Aliev
  - Alekseev
  - Andre Andreev
  - Inesa Armand
  - Artem (F.F. Sergeev)
  - Akhundov
  - Baitursunov
  - Yan Karlovich Berzin
  - Vasily Blakitny
  - Nikolay Bukarin
  - Chernov
  - Raya Dunayevskaya
  - Feliks Dzerzhinsky
  - Abel Enukidze
  - Serafima Gopner
  - Firzov
  - Galimdzhan Ibrahimov
  - Idrisov
  - E.N. Ignatov
  - Adolf Joffe
  - Mikhail Kalinin
  - Faizullah Khojaev
  - Felix Kohn
  - Alexandra Kollontai
  - Alexander Krasnoshchyokov
  - Nikolay Krestinsky
  - Nadezhda Krupskaya
  - Vladimir Lenin
  - Aleksandr Lozovsky
  - Anatoly Lunacharsky
  - Majorova
  - Dmitry Manuilsky
  - Mereshin
  - Mikhail Olminsky
  - Valerian Osinsky
  - Mikhail Pavlovich-Weltmann
  - Stanislav Pestkovsky
  - Mikhail Pokrovsky
  - Posner
  - Yevgeny Preobrazhensky
  - Karl Radek
  - Rafes
  - Christian Rakovsky
  - Ramonov
  - David Riazanov
  - Rivkin
  - Rodzaev
  - Jānis Rudzutaks
  - Aleksey Rykov
  - Oscar Ryvkin
  - Sadovskaia
  - G.I. Safarov
  - Sakharov
  - Sekhibgarey Said-Galiev
  - Leonid Serebryakov
  - Alexander Shlyapnikov
  - Alexander Shumsky
  - Nikolai Skrypkin
  - Petr Smidovich
  - Vladimir Sorin
  - Grigory Sokolnikov
  - Iurii Steklov
  - Mirsäyet Soltanğäliev
  - Taetlin
  - Viktor Taratuta
  - Leon Trotsky
  - Mikhail Tomsky
  - Grigori Tsiperovich
  - Vadim Vatin
  - Voronova
  - Emilien Yaroslavsky
  - Yanson
  - Zeitlin
  - Grigory Zinoviev
- Spain: National Confederation of Labor
  - Ángel Pestaña
- Sweden: Left Social Democratic Party of Sweden
  - Kata Dahlström
  - Sven Linderot
- Switzerland: Communist Party of Switzerland (Forderung)
  - Backer
  - Jakob Herzog
- Switzerland: Social Democratic Party Left
  - Walther Bringolf
  - Jules Humbert-Droz
- United States: Communist Party of America
  - Louis Fraina
  - Alexander Stocklitski
- United States: Communist Labor Party of America
  - Alexander Bilan
  - Edward I. Lindgren ("Flynn")
  - Eadmon MacAlpine
  - John Reed
- United States: Independent Socialist Youth
  - Nathan Chabrow
  - Jurgis
- Yugoslavia: Communist Party of Yugoslavia
  - Ilija Milkić
- Communist Youth International
  - Sigi Bamatter (Switzerland)
  - Willi Münzenberg (Germany)
  - Lazar Shatzkin (Russia)

== Consultative Delegates (voice, no vote) ==
- Australia: Communist League
  - Freeman
  - Susenko
- Austria: Poale Zion
  - Cohn-Eber
- Bukhara: Communist Party of Bukhara
  - Machamadyer
- China: Chinese Socialist Workers Party
  - Lao Hsiu-chao
  - An En-Hak
- Czechoslovakia: Communist Group
  - Malinow
  - Sonnenstein
- Estonia: Independent Socialist Party
  - Jonas
- Finland: Communist Party of Finland
  - Edvard Gylling
  - Kustaa Rovio
  - Tammenoksa
- France: Revolutionary Student Group
  - M. Goldenberg
- France: Section française de l'Internationale ouvrière
  - Marcel Cachin
  - Ludovic-Oscar Frossard
- France:(no party affiliation designated)
  - A.E. Abramovich
- Germany: Independent Social Democratic Party (USPD)
  - Arthur Crispien
  - Ernst Däumig
  - Wilhelm Dittmann
- Germany: Communist Workers' Party (KAPD)
  - Jan Appel
  - Franz Jung

(Otto Rühle and August Merges were also sent as delegates of the KAPD after the party lost touch with Appel and Jung. They however refused to participate in the congress.

- Germany: General Workers' Union of Germany (AAUD)
  - Hermann Knüfken
- Great Britain: National League of Labour Youth
  - Walton Newbold
  - Marjory Newbold
- Great Britain: Workers' Socialist Federation
  - Sylvia Pankhurst
  - Helen Crawfurd
- Iceland: Icelandic Labour Party
  - Brynjólfur Bjarnason
  - Hendrik Siemsen Ottósson
- India
  - M.P.B.T. Acharya
- Italy: Socialist Party of Italy
  - Amadeo Bordiga
  - Emileo Columbino
  - D'Aragona
  - Paverini
  - Vincenzo Vacirca
- Mexico: Communist Party of Mexico
  - Helen Allan
- Persia: Communist Party of Persia
  - Hassanov
  - Orudshev
- Russia: Communist Bund
  - Mosei Litvakov
  - Aron Weinstein
- Russia: Party of Revolutionary Communism
  - Pavel Sapozhnikov
  - Aleksei Ustinov
- United States: (no party affiliation specified)
  - Gildea
- Executive Committee of the Communist International
  - Angelica Balabanova (Russia)
  - Lev Karakhan (Russia)
  - Gustav Klinger (Russia)
  - Menshoi

== See also ==
- List of delegates of the 1st Comintern congress
