= List of delegates of the 1st World Congress of the Communist International =

This is a list of delegates of the 1st World Congress of the Communist International. The founding congress that established the Communist International was held in Moscow from 2 March 1919 to 6 March 1919.

== Full delegates ==
=== Russian Communist Party (Bolsheviks) ===
Six delegates shared five votes:

- Vladimir Lenin
- Leon Trotsky
- Joseph Stalin
- Grigory Zinoviev
- Nikolai Bukharin
- Georgy Chicherin

=== Communist Party of Germany ===
One delegate held five votes:

- Hugo Eberlein

=== Socialist Labor Party of America ===
One delegate held five votes:

- Boris Reinstein

=== Communist Party of German Austria ===
Two delegates shared three votes:

- Karl Steinhardt
- Karl Petin

=== Balkan Revolutionary Social Democratic Federation ===
One delegate held three votes:

- Christian Rakovsky

=== Communist Party of Finland ===
Five delegates shared three votes:

- Yrjö Sirola
- Kullervo Manner
- Otto Kuusinen
- Jukka Rahja
- Eino Rahja

=== Communist Party of Hungary ===
One delegate held three votes:

- Endre Rudnyánszky

=== Norwegian Labour Party ===
One delegate held three votes:

- Emil Stang

=== Communist Party of Poland ===
One delegate held three votes:

- Józef Unszlicht

=== Social Democratic Left Party of Sweden ===
One delegate held three votes:

- Otto Grimlund

=== Swiss Social Democratic Party (Opposition) ===
One delegate held three votes:

- Fritz Platten

=== Communist Party of Ukraine ===
Two delegate shared three votes:

- N. A. Skrypnik
- S. I. Gopner

=== Communist Party of Armenia ===
One delegate held a single vote:

- Gurgen Haikun

=== United Group of the Eastern Peoples of Russia ===
Five delegates shared a single vote:

- Mahomet Altimirov
- Hussein Bekentayev
- Kasim Kasimov
- Burhan Mansurov
- Gaziz Yalymov

=== Communist Party of Estonia ===
One delegate held a single vote:

- Hans Pöögelmann

=== Zimmerwald Left of France ===
One delegate held a single vote:

- Henri Guilbeaux

=== Communist Party of the German Colonists in Russia ===
One delegate held a single vote:

- Gustav Klinger

=== Communist Party of Latvia ===
One delegate held a single vote:

- Kārlis Gailis

=== Communist Party of Lithuania and Belorussia ===
One delegate held a single vote:

- Kazys Giedrys

== Consultative delegates ==
=== Russian Communist Party (Bolsheviks) ===
- V. V. Obolensky
- V. V. Vorovsky

=== Bulgarian Communist Group ===
- Stojan Dyorov

=== Central Bureau of Eastern Peoples ===
- Mir Jafar Baghirov (Azerbaijani Section)
- Tengiz Zhgenti (Georgian Section)
- Mirza Davud Bagir-Uglu Gusseinov (Persian Section)
- Gaziz Yalymov (Turkestan Section)
- Mustafa Suphi (Turkish Section)

=== Chinese Socialist Workers Party ===
- Liu Shao-zhou
- Zhang Yong-kui

=== Czech Communist Group ===
- Jaroslav Handlíř

=== French Communist Group ===
- Jacques Sadoul

=== British Communist Group ===
- Joseph Fineberg

=== Korean Workers League in Moscow ===
- Kang Sang-ju

=== Dutch Social Democratic Group ===
- Sebald Rutgers

=== Swiss Communist Group ===
- Leonie Kascher

=== Socialist Propaganda League of America ===
- Sebald Rutgers

=== Yugoslav Communist Group ===
- Ilija Milkić

=== Zimmerwald Committee ===
- Angelica Balabanova

== See also ==
- List of delegates of the 2nd Comintern congress
