= Congress of the Peoples of the East =

1920 multinational conference in Baku

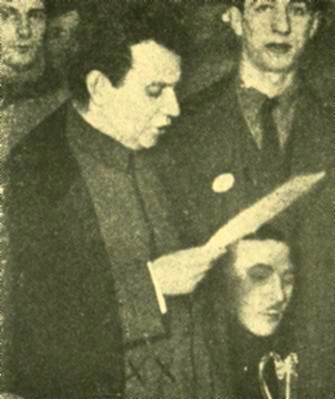
The keynote address to the Congress of the Peoples of the East was delivered by Comintern chief Grigory Zinoviev.

The Congress of the Peoples of the East (Russian: Съезд народов Востока, romanized: S'yezd narodov Vostoka) was a multinational conference held in September 1920 by the Communist International in Baku, Azerbaijan (then the capital of Soviet Azerbaijan). The congress was attended by nearly 1,900 delegates from across Asia and Europe and marked a commitment by the Comintern to support revolutionary nationalist movements in the colonial "East" in addition to the traditional radical labour movement of Europe, North America, and Australasia. Although attended by delegates representing more than two dozen ethnic entities of the Middle East and the Far East, the Baku Congress was dominated by the lengthy speeches of leaders from the Russian Communist Party (RCP), including: Grigory Zinoviev, Karl Radek, Mikhail Pavlovich, and Anatoly Skachko. Non-RCP delegates delivering major reports included Hungarian revolutionary Béla Kun and Turkish feminist Naciye Hanım.

Soviet decision makers recognized that revolutionary activity along the Soviet Union's southern border would draw the attention of capitalist powers and invite them to intervene. It was this understanding which prompted the Russian representation at the Baku Congress to reject the arguments of the national communists as impractical and counterproductive to the revolution in general, without elaborating their fear that the safety of Russia lay in the balance. And it was this understanding, coupled with the Russian Bolsheviks' displeasure at seeing another revolutionary center proposed in their own revolutionary empire, that galvanized them into action against the national communists. The gathering adopted a formal "Manifesto of the Peoples of the East" as well as an "Appeal to the Workers of Europe, America, and Japan." While an executive body was elected to carry on Comintern work in the Middle East and the Far East, the long-term effect of the Congress was ultimately symbolic rather than practical, serving as a marker of Comintern commitment to the revolutionary anti-colonial movements of the east but forging few lasting ties.

== Background ==
The Communist International (Comintern) was established at the Founding Congress held in Moscow in March 1919. A haphazard affair, which was attended by many sympathetic radicals who had no formal mandate from their home organizations, the Comintern's structure was perfected and formalized at its 2nd World Congress, held in July and August 1920. It was this latter and more inclusive gathering, attended by a significant contingent of delegates from the continent of Asia, which authorized the convocation a specialized gathering to rally the various national and anti-colonial movements around the Comintern's banner.

These national-colonial liberation movements were seen as a mechanism for the shattering of colonial empires and the removal of the markets which were believed to be instrumental in the stabilization of imperialist, capitalist economies. Moreover, with revolutionary sentiment strong in the nations bordering Soviet Russia the Comintern believed that strong revolutionary movements in these countries would provide an additional line of defense to ward off foreign invasion by the enemies of the Bolshevik regime.

The written call for the Congress was made in the July 1920 issue of Communist International, the official monthly magazine of the Comintern. Signed by Comintern president Grigory Zinoviev and 25 Western European and American members of the Executive Committee of the Communist International, the call originally slated the opening of the gathering for August 15, 1920 — although the date was soon postponed by two weeks to September 1. The gathering was billed as "a congress of...workers and peasants of Persia, Armenia, and Turkey," according to the text of the convention call. The document asked supporters to "spare no effort to ensure that as many as possible are present" for the Congress. It made use of religious imagery in noting:

Formerly you traveled across deserts to reach the holy places. Now make your way over mountains and rivers, through forests and deserts, to meet and discuss how to free yourselves from the chains of servitude and unite in fraternal alliance, so as to live a life based on equality, freedom, and brotherhood.

Physical arrangements for the Baku Congress were coordinated by a small committee in that city including the Azerbaijani communists Nariman Narimanov and M. D. Huseinov, Said Gabiev from Dagestan, Mustafa Suphi of Turkey, as well as the Georgian Sergo Ordzhonikidze and the Russian Elena Stasova. Transportation was difficult, with many delegates traveling together from Moscow following the conclusion of the 2nd World Congress of the Comintern in a special train designated for that purpose. Even this was no easy task, as the train passed through territory wracked by the ongoing Russian Civil War including destroyed train stations and railway sidings littered with burned rail cars.

Soviet Russia was additionally the subject of a military blockade (cordon sanitaire) at the time, with the government of Great Britain in particular doing its best to impede travel to oil-rich Baku. Two delegates were killed and several wounded when a ship traveling to Baku from Iran was attacked by British warplanes. Additionally, British ships patrolled the Black Sea, making travel from Turkey a risky affair. The governments of Armenia and Georgia banned attendance at the conference, forcing delegates to use stealth at border crossings from these countries.

Despite various hardships, nearly 1,900 delegates ultimately succeeded in making their way to Baku for convocation of the Congress of the Peoples of the East on September 1, 1920. The gathering was by far the largest assembly of delegates organized by the Comintern to that date.

== Delegates ==
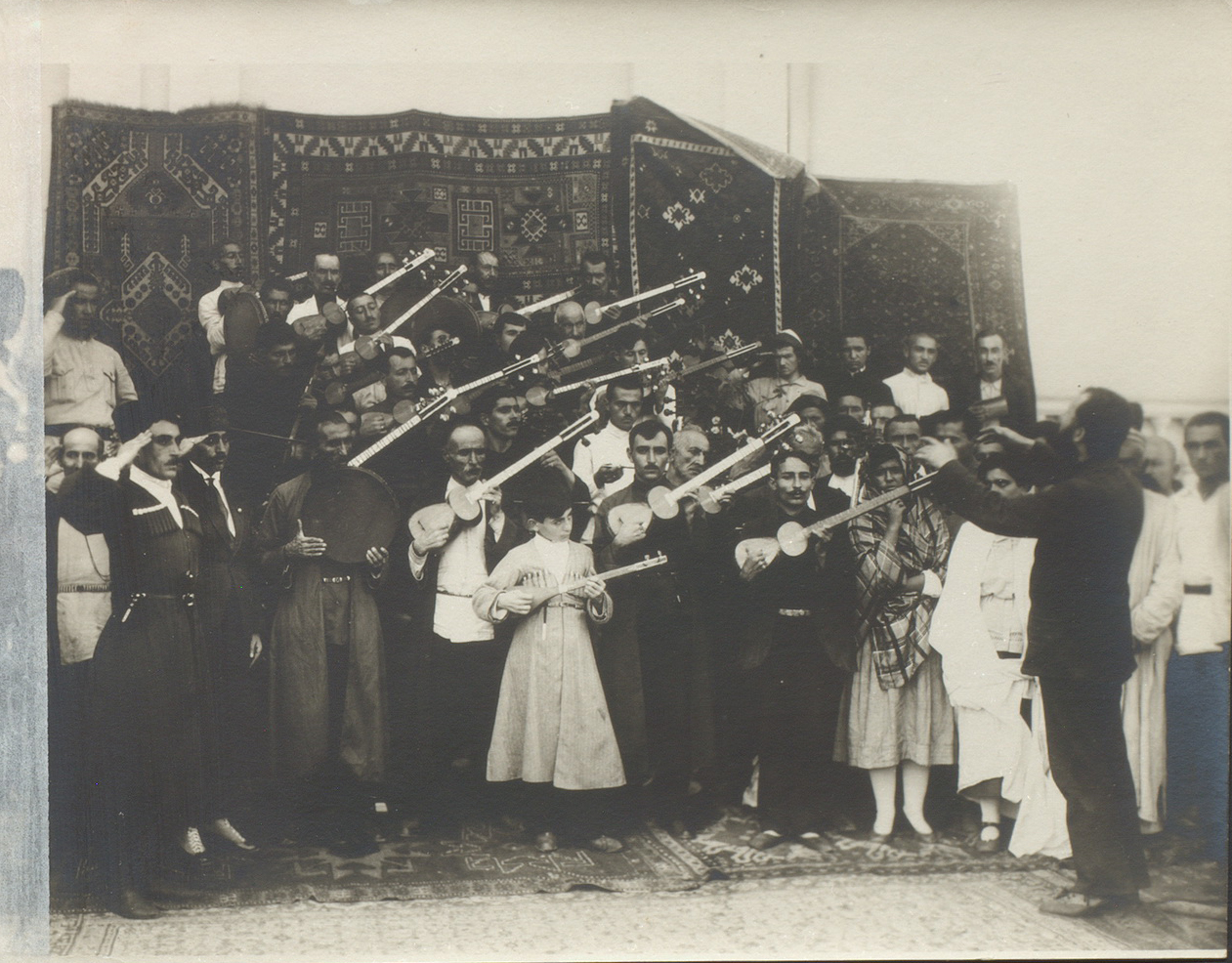
An "Eastern Orchestra" played for delegates during the September 1920 Baku Congress.

Congress of the Peoples of the East

Despite the fact that nearly 1,300 of the 1,891 delegates attending the Baku Congress were registered as "communists", those attending the gathering were not, in general, veteran Marxist revolutionaries. Rather, these were largely anti-colonial fighters and their sympathizers, with a smattering of professional revolutionaries from the Bolshevik organizations of Azerbaijan, Armenia, Kazakhstan, and Soviet Russia. This situation was a reflection of the fact that in 1920 Communist Parties had been established in very few of the colonial and semi-colonial nations of Asia.

Industrialization was minimal in these nations, the trade union movement virtually non-existent, and national bourgeoisies very weak in comparison to those of the colonial powers. Movements for national independence were barely beginning and consequently those attracted to the Comintern's red flame were, in the words of Comintern chief Grigory Zinoviev, "heterogeneous" and "motley" in composition.

This heterogeneity was problematic for congress organizers, as the vast number of languages spoken by participants presented a massive task for translators. Rousing speeches could be delivered only with painful delays as a myriad of translators rehashed and restated words from their original language to languages comprehensible to their listeners. Understanding of the words being spoken was imperfect, with accents often heavy, and the conference hall crowded and noisy. Moreover, religious and ethnic tension such as those between Muslims and non-Muslims, and Armenians and Turks, subtly undermined the Congress's harmony.

The opening of the congress on September 1 was preceded by an opening rally held the day before under the auspices of the Baku Soviet and the Trade Union Congress of Azerbaijan. Opening at almost 1:30 in the morning, the gathering gave Zinoviev, Karl Radek, and the various representatives of the Comintern from Europe and America a rousing welcome, with an orchestra playing the revolutionary anthem "The Internationale" repeatedly. Introductory remarks were delivered by Nariman Narimanov on behalf of the Communist Party of Azerbaijan and the keynote speech by Grigory Zinoviev. Additional speeches were made by Radek and Hungarian revolutionary leader Béla Kun, all of whom spoke in Russian with Turkic summary translation. Short speeches were also delivered Tom Quelch of Britain, Alfred Rosmer of France, John Reed of the United States, and Karl Steinhardt of Austria. The meeting finally drew to a close at 3:30 a.m. with the formal Congress slated to open the following night.

== The Congress ==
=== Speeches of Zinoviev and Radek ===
Karl Radek (L) at the 2nd World Congress of the Comintern, Moscow, July–August 1920

The Congress of the Peoples of the East took place in seven sessions over an eight-day period. The first session, called to order at 9:40 p.m. on the night of September 1 by Nariman Narimanov, noted the existence of organized communist and non-party "fractions" and the seating of a pre-chosen slate of 16 representatives of each of these groups. Grigory Zinoviev was elected Chairman of the Congress by acclamation and Vladimir Lenin, Zinoviev, and Leon Trotsky were honored additionally as "honorary chairmen". Ten honorary members of the Presiding Committee were also named including: the American John Reed, Tom Quelch of Great Britain, Rosmer, Radek, Steinhardt, and Soviet People's Commissar of Nationalities Joseph Stalin, among others.

The first session was almost entirely dedicated to a lengthy keynote speech delivered by Zinoviev, who declared the Baku Congress to be the "second half of the [Second World] Congress that recently finished its work in Moscow". The new Communist International was contrasted to the old Second International by Zinoviev, with the communist future painted in rosy terms in which:

...[T]he peasants of the entire East, under the wise leadership of the organized workers in the West, will now be able to rise up in their hundreds of millions in order to carry out a real, thoroughgoing agrarian revolution. They will be able to clear the soil so that no large landowners are left, no debt slavery, no taxes, dues, or any other variety of the devices used by the rich are left, and the land passes into the hands of the laboring masses.

Zinoviev declared that the 2nd World Congress had determined that it would not be necessary for the nations of the East to have "passed through the state of capitalism" before embarking upon socialist revolution. The nations of China, India, Persia (Iran), Turkey, and Armenia were explicitly singled out by Zinoviev as ripe for "proletarian revolution" in his keynote address.

The following night's session, opened with Zinoviev in the chair, was dedicated to the international political situation and revolved around a lengthy speech by Karl Radek. Radek targeted the British and Russian empires for their protracted imperial struggle over "the peoples of the East," joined in the 20th Century by the rival empires of Germany and France. Radek attempted to reveal World War I as in large measure a struggle of these imperialist powers for markets in the Middle East and Far East. The enormous cost of this war in money and lives had severely weakened all of these capitalist powers, winners and losers alike, Radek argued, increasing the need for colonial exploitation while at the same time making it possible for the danger to "pass away like a bad dream if the toiling masses of the East will rise up together with the workers of Europe."

=== Reports by others ===
The third session, lasting three hours, was held in the early afternoon of September 3 and dealt largely with the situation in Turkestan.

The fourth session, convened that same evening, heard a series of speakers, including the reading of a substantial written statement by the controversial Enver Pasha of Turkey. Enver, a nationalist who came to power in 1908, and who was one of those primarily responsible for the 1915 Armenian genocide, was a highly divisive figure among the delegates, many of whom hailed from Armenia and others who held Mustafa Kemal Atatürk, Enver's sworn enemy, in high regard. With the sympathetic support of Kemal seen as important to Soviet foreign policy, a compromise had been brokered providing for the reading of Kemal's statement without his physical presence in the hall — a decision which took the edge off of the inevitable anger and hubbub on the floor when it was read.

Session five was held during the night of September 5, 1920 and dealt with the questions of nationalism and colonialism, with the discussion based upon a lengthy speech delivered to the gathering by Mikhail Pavlovich, a Bolshevik official in the People's Commissariat of Foreign Affairs. Pavlovich represented modern imperialist rivalry in the East as a three-way conflict between the empires of Germany, Great Britain, and Russia — with new players the United States, France, and Japan entering the fray during the World War and its immediate aftermath. Pavlovich railed against "the criminal blockade and the bloody war that was forced upon us" and to applause asserted that "a war against Soviet Russia is a war against the revolutionary East, and, vice versa, a war against the East is a war against Soviet Russia!" He also charged the Turkish government of Enver Pasha with "disgraceful" behavior at the Brest-Litovsk negotiations and the Menshevik government of Georgia with aggression in South Ossetia.

At the sixth Session, during the night of September 6, a set of "Theses on Soviet Power in the East" were delivered as part of a report by Hungarian revolutionary leader Bela Kun. These theses asserted that "even after the rule of the foreign imperialists has been eliminated, the revolution of the toiling masses of the East will not come to a halt", but would rather move past rule by a national bourgeoisie to "complete liberation from imperialist exploitation" through "transfer of the land to the toilers" and "removal from power of the non-working element, all foreign colonialist elements, ...and all privileged persons".

Kun was followed by a report on the agrarian question by Comintern China expert Anatoly Skachko. A lengthy set of Theses on the Agrarian Question were presented as part of Skachko's report calling for the overthrow of colonial and landlord rule, the takeover of lands, and the cancellation of debts and taxes Skachko reminded the audience that

The peasants of the East, now marching arm in arm with their democratic bourgeoisie to win independence for their countries from the Western Imperialist powers, must remember that they have their own special tasks to perform. Their liberation will not be achieved merely by winning political independence, and therefore they cannot halt and rest content when that is won.... For the complete and real liberation of the peasantry of the East from all forms of oppression, dependence, and exploitation, it is also necessary to overthrow the rule of their landlords and bourgeoisie and to establish the Soviet power of the workers and peasants...

A final seventh session, held the night of September 7, established a permanent executive body called the Council for Propaganda and Action of the Peoples of the East. This body was to convene additional Congresses of the Peoples of the East "no less frequently than once a year" and to conduct day-to-day work in the interval between Congresses. This entity seems to have been more or less stillborn, with only one subsequent Congress of the Toilers of the East convened in Moscow in January and February 1922.

An additional short discussion on the situation faced by the women's movement in the East was also conducted, with Naciye Hanım of the Communist Party of Turkey delivering a report to the congress in Turkish. Included was a call for equality of rights between the genders, unconditional access of women to education, equality of marriage rights, an end to polygamy, employment of women in government institutions, and the establishment of committees for the rights and protection of women.

== Assessments and legacy ==
British historian E. H. Carr emphasized the Comintern's "uncompromising" promotion of the notion of revolution combined with its willingness to compromise with Muslim traditions:

Muslim beliefs and institutions were treated with veiled respect, and the cause of world revolution narrowed down to specific and more manageable dimensions. The Muslim tradition of jihad, or holy war against the infidel, was harnessed to a modern crusade of oppressed peoples against the imperialist oppressors, with Britain as the main target.

Soviet decision makers recognized that revolutionary activity along the Soviet Union's southern border would draw the attention of capitalist powers and invite them to intervene. It was this understanding which prompted the Russian representation at the Baku Congress in September 1920 to reject the arguments of the national communists as impractical and counterproductive to the revolution in general, without elaborating their fear that the safety of Russia lay in the balance. And it was this understanding, coupled with the Russian Bolsheviks' displeasure at seeing another revolutionary center proposed in their own revolutionary empire, that galvanized them into action against the national communists. Carr noted that owing to the unwieldy size of the gathering, policy debates and decisions took place behind closed doors, conducted by appointed leaders of the communist and non-communist "fractions" that were present. "A multinational assembly nearly 2,000 strong is not a working body", Carr observed. He further noted that the Baku Congress "had no successor, and left little behind it in the way of [organizational] machinery" beyond a report to the Executive Committee of the Communist International by the Council for Propaganda and Action of the Peoples of the East and perhaps a single issue of a theoretical journal called The Peoples of the East.

== Attendance by ethnicity ==
According to a survey conducted of congress delegates the following ethnicities (natsional'nosty) were represented at the 1920 Baku Congress.

- Turks (included both Turks and Azerbaijanis) — 235
- Persians — 192
- Armenians — 157
- Russians — 104
- Georgians — 100
- Chechens — 82
- Tajiks — 61
- Kirghizes — 47
- Jews — 41
- Turkmens — 35
- Kumyks — 33
- Lesghians — 25
- Ossetians — 17
- Uzbeks — 15
- Indians — 14
- Ingushes — 13
- Jamshidis — 12
- Hazaras — 11
- Sarts — 10
- Kabardians — 9
- Chinese — 8
- Kurds — 8
- Avars — 7
- Poles — 5
- Hungarians — 3
- Germans — 3
- Kalmucks (Kalmyks) — 3
- Koreans — 3
- Arabs — 3
- Tekintsy — 2
- Abkhazians — 2
- Bashkirs — 1
- Ukrainians — 1
- Croats — 1
- Czechs — 1
- Latvians — 1
- TOTAL — 1,275
- No nationality stated — 266
- No questionnaire — more than 100

== See also ==
- League against Imperialism
