= Jaroslav Handlíř =

Czech politician and soldier

Jaroslav Handlíř (20 November 1888 – 21 September 1942) was a Czech politician and soldier who was a leader in both Czechoslovak and international communism and later joined the Social Democratic Party of Czechoslovakia.

== Biography ==
=== Early years ===
Born in 1888 in Bohemia, Handlíř was drafted into the Austro-Hungarian Army during the First World War. He was captured on the Eastern Front and became a Bolshevik following the October Revolution of 1917 and helped found a Czechoslovak communist group in Russia.

=== Political career ===
Handlíř represented the Czechoslovak communists at the founding congress of the Comintern in March 1919 and participated in political and militant activities in Czechoslovakia. Participating in a strike in December 1920, he was arrested, tried, and convicted to a short prison term in March 1921. Following his release he helped found and then represented the newly formed Communist Party of Czechoslovakia at the Third Congress of the Comintern in June and July 1921, where he was elected to the secretariat. He served in multiple organs of the national party and also headed the lumber workers' trade union.

By the mid-1920s Handlíř was dissatisfied with the direction of the Czechoslovak party and at its third congress in 1925 criticized the leadership and supported the party's right-wing. Along with Břetislav Hůla and Miloš Vaněk he addressed the Executive Committee of the Communist International and further promoted a right-wing viewpoint in 1926. While remaining a party member, he no longer held any leadership role and was expelled in 1929, following which he joined the Social Democratic Party.

=== Death and legacy ===
Jaroslav Handlíř was arrested by the Gestapo and sent to Auschwitz Birkenau and died in 1942.
