= Grigori Tsiperovich =

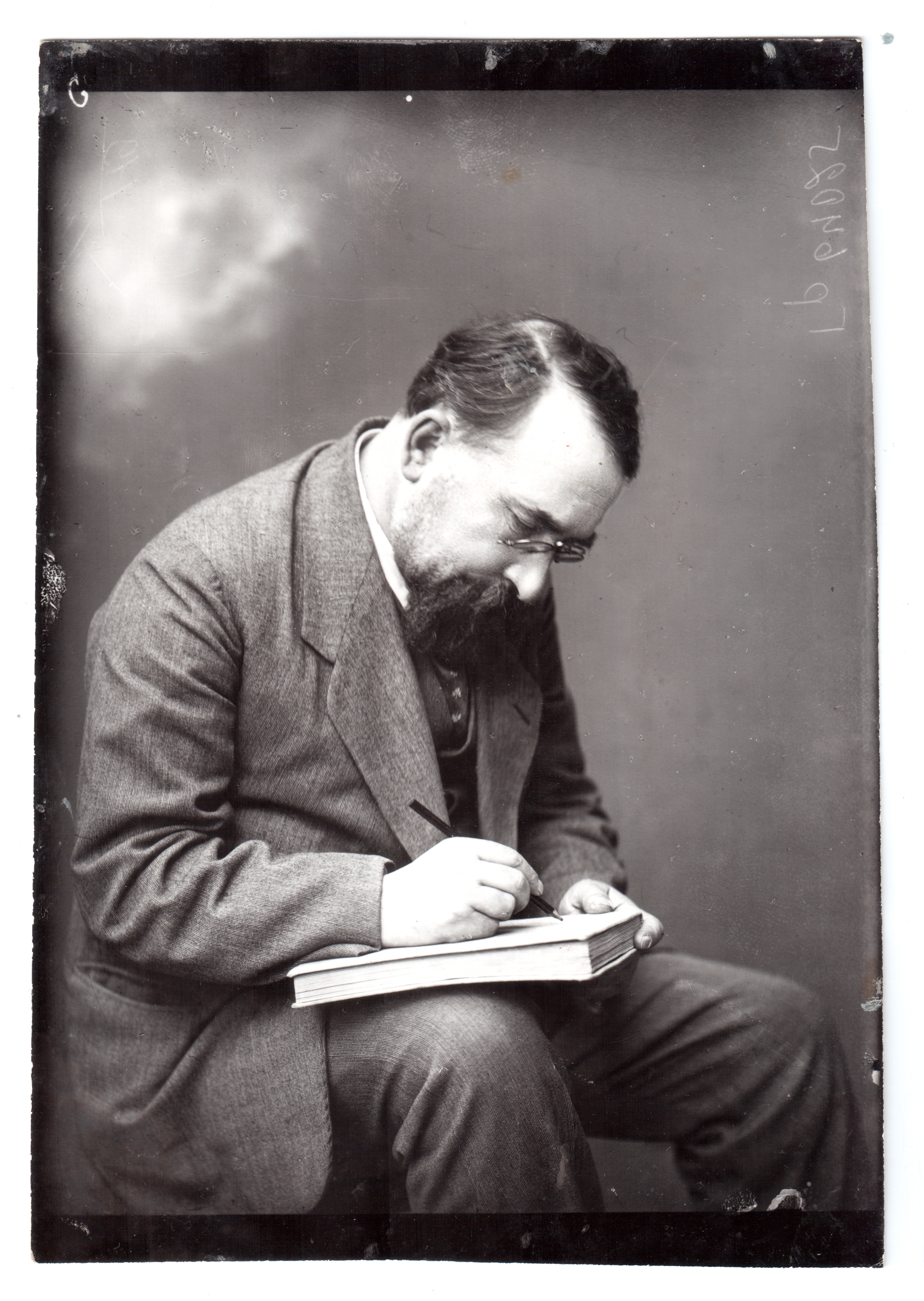
Grigori Tsiperovich in 1920

Grigori Vladimirovich Tsiperovich (Russian: Григорий Владимирович Циперович, the last name also spelled Tsyperovich Russian: Цыперович); (1871 in Odessa – 21 February 1932 in Leningrad) was a Russian economist, publicist and trade unionist active in the Russian Communist Party (Bolshevik).

Tsiperovich was active in the Russian Socialist movement before the 1917 Revolution. He joined the Bolsheviks in 1919 and was a part of the Russian delegation to the Second Congress of the Comintern in 1920. He was part of the Trade Union Commission and was elected as an alternate member of the Executive Committee of the Communist International. He also attended the Second Congress of the Comintern (June 1921), being nominated to the Provisional Committee of the Profintern. He also played a role with the Petrograd Economic Council. He also worked with Mikhail Tomsky on a set of theses for presentation to the Fourth Congress of the All Russian Congress of Trade Unions.

Lenin appointed him to work with Leon Trotsky and Alexander Bogdanov on regulations concerning the activities of foreign capitalists active within the Soviet Union. This later led to him working in the Commissariat for Foreign Affairs.

Towards the end of his life he was Rector of the Industrial Academy, Leningrad.

== Works ==
- (1919) Syndicates and Trusts in Russia, Moscow
