= László Rudas =

Hungarian philosopher, academic, and politician (1885–1950)

László Rudas (born A. Róth; 21 February 1885 in Sárvár – 29 April 1950 in Budapest) was a Hungarian communist newspaper editor, philosopher, professor and politician who become director of the Central Party School of the Communist Party of Hungary.

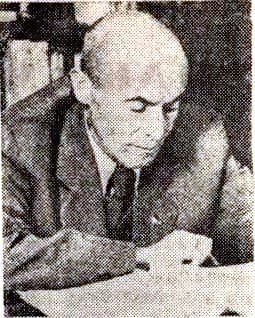
László Rudas

== Biography ==
=== Before the 1918 Revolution ===
László Rudas was born in Sárvár in to a poor working-class family on 21 February 1885. He joined the Social Democratic Party of Hungary (SDP) in 1903 as a university student and identified with the revolutionary socialist left wing of the party. From 1905 he was on the staff of Népszava (People's Voice), the official organ of the Hungarian SDP.

Following the October 1918 Hungarian Revolution, Rudas consistently stood on the left wing of the Hungarian SDP, voting with a minority of the Central Committee to condemn the Hungarian majority socialists for participation in the independent Hungarian government of Mihály Károlyi. Whereas the majority socialists sought an independent Hungary within the framework of a monarchy, the left wing sought insurrection leading to establishment of a workers' republic of the Bolshevik type, as was currently being established in Soviet Russia.

On November 17, 1918, Rudas and his co-thinker, János Hirrosik, called a secret meeting of 50 left wing members of the SDP. Rudas denounced the compromises made by the leadership of his party and called for the immediate formation of a new radical political organization, an idea which was not immediately supported by a majority of the session's participants. However, a week later, on November 24, members of the SDP met in a private apartment in Buda and acceded to Béla Kun's demand for the establishment of the Communist Party of Hungary. Rudas was a member from the Party's inception and was one of 18 original members on its first Central Committee. members. He also served as editor-in-chief of the party's official newspaper, Vörös Ujság ("Red Gazette").

Rudas was the first translator of V.I. Lenin's The State and Revolution into Hungarian and also produced a number of other translations of Russian pamphlet literature.

Rudas was designated as the delegate of the Hungarian party to the founding congress of the Communist International (Comintern) in March 1919, but was unable to reach Moscow until a month after the gathering had concluded. Rudas stayed in Moscow for several months, attending meetings of the Executive Committee of the Communist International (ECCI). He then left for Germany and Austria, where he took part in the highly factionalized politics of the exiled Hungarian Communist Party (CP).

During the Hungarian Revolution, Rudas stood with the far left of the revolutionary government, urging "strong and merciless" application of the proletarian dictatorship "until the world revolution spreads elsewhere in Europe." He was regarded by revolutionary leader Béla Kun as an advisor on ideological matters, along with György Lukács.

=== After the fall of the Hungarian Revolution ===
After the fall of the Hungarian revolutionary government, Rudas was among the 100,000 people who emigrated from the country, avoiding the fate of many — some 5,000 executions were conducted and 75,000 imprisonments made of revolutionary participants by the right wing regime of Miklós Horthy.

Rudas, ever the leftist, drew a radical conclusion from the fall of the Kun regime, declaring in 1920 that "the mistake lay not in unification [of various strata of the country behind the revolutionary government]. The mistake was in the communists' abandonment of the struggle to captivate the masses." In the extreme factional politics following the fall of the revolution, the hardline Rudas was an opponent of József Pogány (John Pepper), regarded by the left wing as an opportunist; the moderate wing of the Communist Party regarded Rudas and his associates as dangerous revolutionary adventurers.

In March 1922 Rudas returned to Moscow to attend meetings of ECCI and its Presidium. He was co-opted into the Comintern apparatus, remaining to teach in Moscow at the Institute of Red Professors, later at the Comintern's International Lenin School.

During the 1930s, Rudas worked at the Marx–Engels–Lenin Institute in Moscow and contributed frequently to the theoretical journal Pod znamenem marksizma ("Under the Banner of Marxism"). He was arrested in 1938, during the last days of the Great Terror, but was subsequently released. He was arrested again in 1941 during the first panicky days of the German invasion but was released again, along with Lukács, who had also been taken in the roundup.

After the conclusion of the Second World War, Rudas returned to Hungary, where he became director of the Central Party School of the Communist Party of Hungary as well as a member of the Hungarian Academy of Sciences. He also served as a member of parliament from 1945 to 1950.

Rudas was a voice of staunch party orthodoxy, leading a criticism of the ideas of Lukács in 1949.

László Rudas died in Budapest on 29 April 1950.

== Works ==
=== Books and pamphlets ===
- Dialectical Materialism and Communism. London: Labour Monthly, 1934. 2nd ed., 1935.
- The Materialist Worldview. (1947)

=== Articles ===
- The Proletarian Revolution in Hungary, in: The Communist International, vol. 1, no. 1 (May 1, 1919), p.55.
- The Meaning of Sidney Hook, in: The Communist, vol. 14, no. 4 (April 1935), p.326–349.
- On the Origin of Greek Philosophy, in: Вестник Коммунистической Академии, Vol. 30, p.127-158, Moscow, 1928.
- Lukács as a Theorist of Class Consciousness, in: Вестник Коммунистической Академии, Vol. 9, p.198-252, Moscow, 1924.
- Overcoming Capitalist Reification or the Dialectical Dialectic of Comrade Lukács, in: Вестник Коммунистической Академии, Vol. 10, p.3-66, Moscow, 1925.
- Orthodox Marxism, in: Вестник Коммунистической Академии, Vol. 8, p. 281-304, Moscow, 1924.
- The Mechanistic and Dialectical Theory of Causality (Bukharin’s Theory of Causality), in: Вестник Коммунистической Академии, Vol. 35-36, p.74-92, Moscow, 1929.
- Lenin and the Tasks of Marxist-Leninists in Europe, in: Вестник Коммунистической Академии, Vol. 11, p.28-36, Moscow, 1925.
- Meeting with Lenin, in: Reminiscences of Foreign Contemporaries, p.146-150, Moscow, Progress Publishers, 1968.
