= Marie-Sophie Nielsen =

Danish communist leader

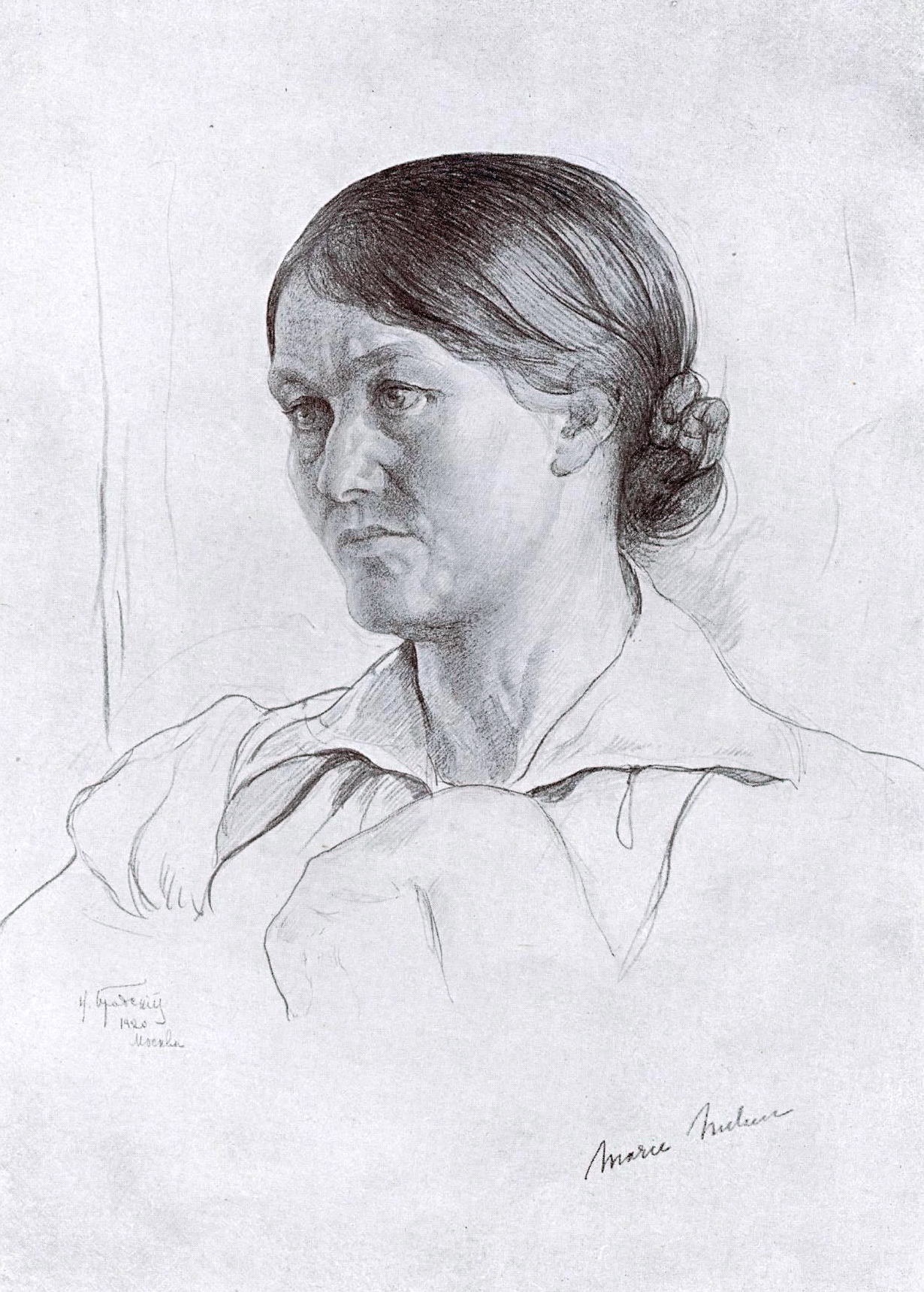
Marie-Sophie Nielsen (1920)

Marie-Sophie Nielsen (23 December 1875 – 6 April 1951) was a Danish communist leader who was a founding member of the Danish Socialist Workers Party and the Communist Party of Denmark.

== Biography ==
=== Early years ===
Marie-Sophie Nielsen was born in 1875 in the village Nørre Herlev, North Zealand.

=== Political career ===
From 1916 to 1918 Nielsen was a key member of the Danish Social Democratic Party, sitting on that organization's directing committee.

In March 1918, Nielsen was a participant in the establishment of the Danish Socialist Workers Party, a left-wing offshoot of the Social Democratic Party, which favored affiliation with the Communist International.

Nielsen became a founding member of the Communist Party of Denmark (CPD) in 1920. The same year she was a delegate representing the Communist Teachers Club to the 2nd World Congress of the Comintern, held in Petrograd and Moscow.

In 1928 she was expelled by the Communist Party for not supporting the campaign against Leon Trotsky. Nielsen was readmitted to the CPD in 1932 but was expelled again in 1936.

=== Death and legacy ===
Marie-Sophie Nielsen died in 1951 in Copenhagen.
