= Nørre Herlev =

- Town
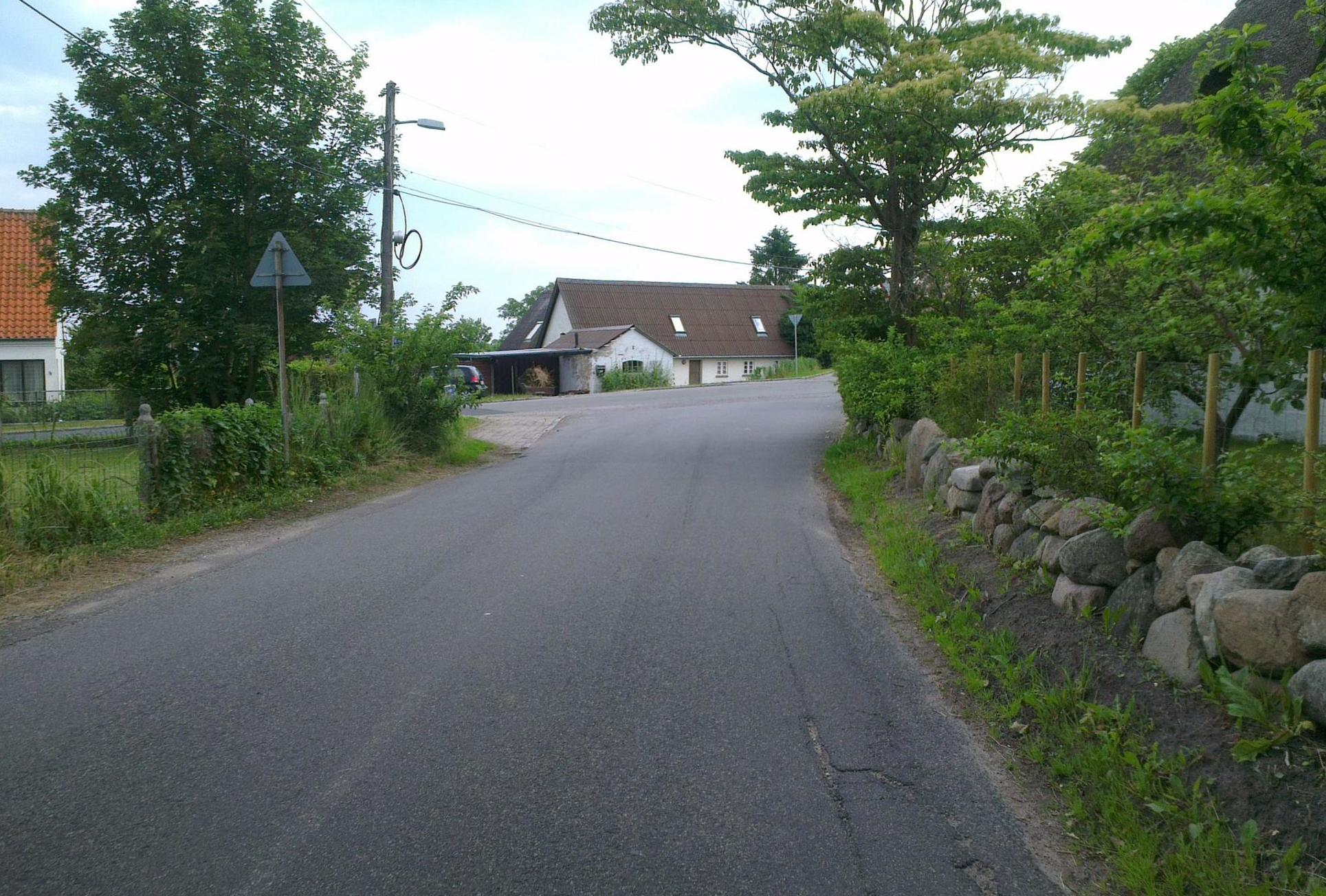
- Bygaden in Nørre Herlev

- Location in Denmark Nørre Herlev (Capital Region)
- Coordinates: 55°53′20″N 12°16′28″E
- Country: Denmark
- Region: Capital Region
- Municipality: Hillerød Municipality

Population (2026)
  - Urban: 422
- Time zone: UTC+1 (CET)
  - Summer (DST): UTC+2 (CEST)
- Postal code: DK-3400 Hillerød

Nørre Herlev (often abbreviated Nr. Herlev) is a village in Hillerød Municipality in North Zealand, Denmark. As of 1 January 2026 it has a population of 422 inhabitants. It is located in the southern part of the municipality, c. 6 kilometres (3.7 mi) south of the town of Hillerød.

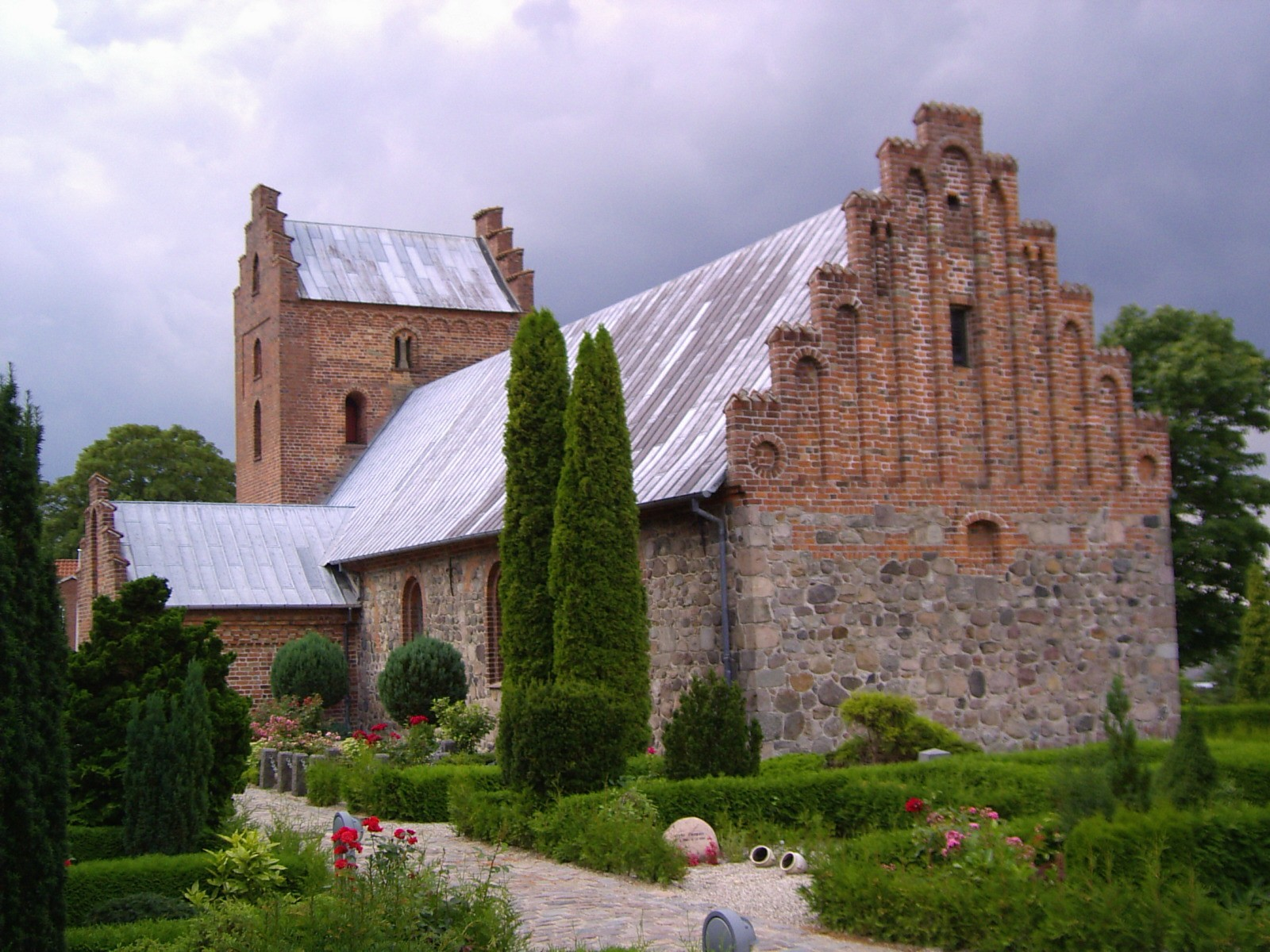
Nørre Herlev Church

Nørre Herlev Church is located in the centre of the town. Since 1950, the village has been served by Brødeskov railway station (called Brødeskov to avoid confusion with Herlev railway station in Greater Copenhagen) located on the Frederiksværk railway line.

== Notable people ==
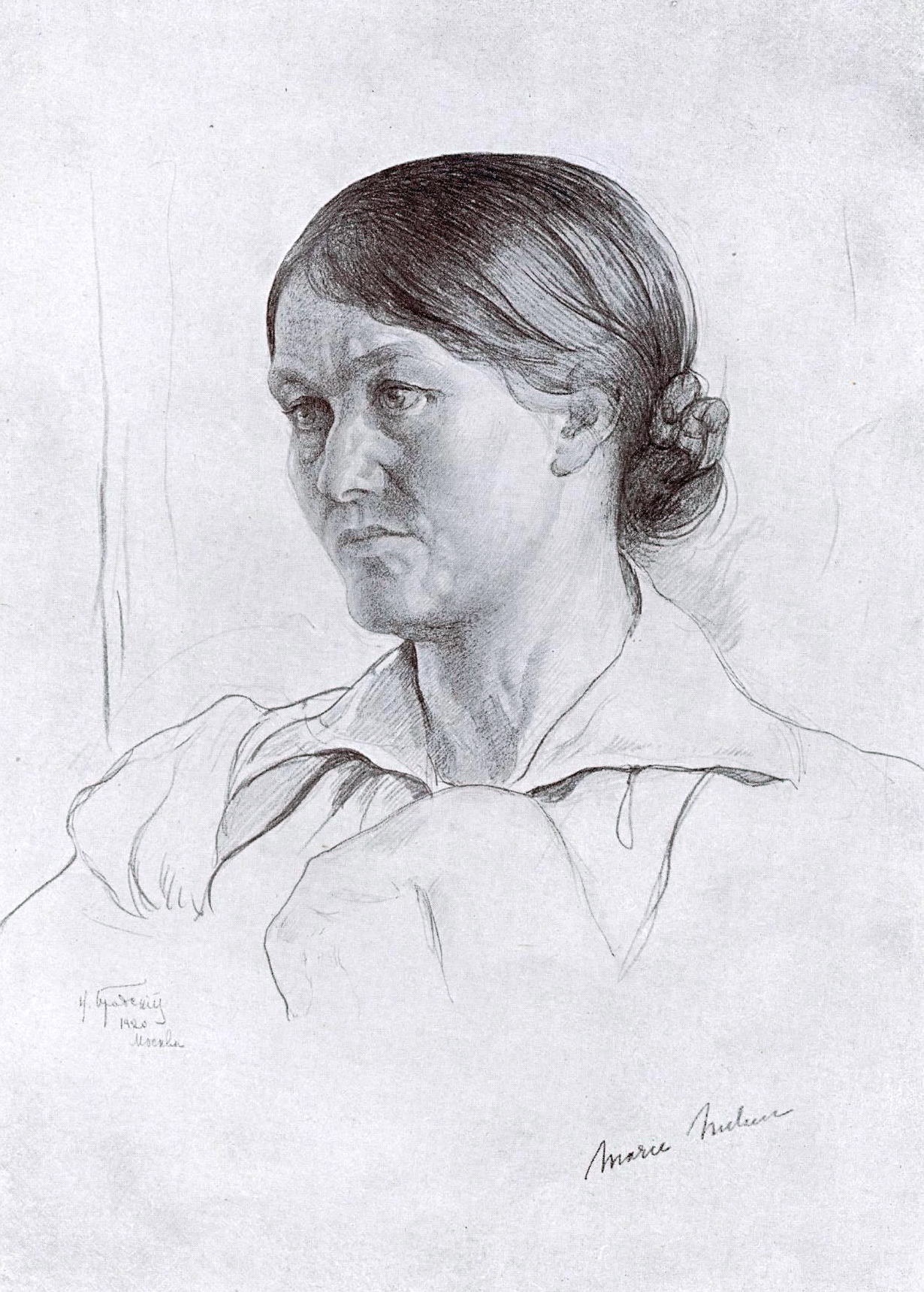
Marie-Sophie Nielsen by Isaak Brodsky, 1920.

- Ulrich Jørgensen Kaas (1677–1746), a Danish nobleman and officer who was an admiral in the Dano-Norwegian navy, is buried at Nørre Herlev cemetery.
- Marie-Sophie Nielsen (1875–1951), a Danish communist leader who was a founding member of the Danish Socialist Workers Party and the Communist Party of Denmark, was born in Nørre Herlev.
