= Richard Beech =

Industrial Unionist

Richard Clyde Beech (1893–1955) was a revolutionary industrial unionist. He was the delegate for the Industrial Workers of the World (IWW) to the 2nd World Congress of the Comintern.

== Family life ==
Born in Kingston upon Hull, Beech ran away to sea with his brother Charlie. The pair then travelled widely working as miners and seamen in Australia and North America. By the outbreak of war they were seamen sailing between Liverpool and the USA. Richard married Dr Moira Elizabeth Connolly in 1940, the daughter of James Connolly. His granddaughter, Donna Dougall, was doing family research in 2010 when she discovered that she was the great granddaughter of James Connolly.

== Political activity ==
Beech was a supporter of the IWW, and attended the 2nd World Congress of the Comintern as a supporter of it. This convinced him to join the Communist Party (British Section of the Third International), and he was one of its two delegates in the unity negotiations which re-established the Communist Party of Great Britain (CPGB). He served on its executive for most of 1921, while working as a travelling salesman.

During the mid-1920s, Beech devoted much of his time to the National Minority Movement, in this capacity he chaired a public meeting held during the unofficial 1925 sailors strike. In 1927, he and Harry Pollitt were co-defendants in a case brought by the National Union of Seamen. However, he objected to Trotsky's expulsion from the Communist Party of the Soviet Union. He contacted James P. Cannon, who was forming the Trotskyist Communist League of America, and began selling its newspaper, The Militant, in the UK. He wrote for the Militant under the pseudonym 'Black Diamond'. Beech subsequently corresponded with Leon Trotsky until 1931 and from time to time helped Trotkyists in Britain.

Beech joined the Chemical Workers' Union in about 1930, later serving as its president, and becoming editor of its journal. In 1939, he joined the Independent Labour Party, having been recruited by Bob Edwards. However, he and Edwards left the party in the late 1940s, joining the Labour Party. Beech was also active in the Movement for Colonial Freedom.

== Works ==
- Torpedoed, and other short stories, (1943) Harrow: Progressive Publishers
