= Endre Rudnyánszky =

Hungarian lawyer

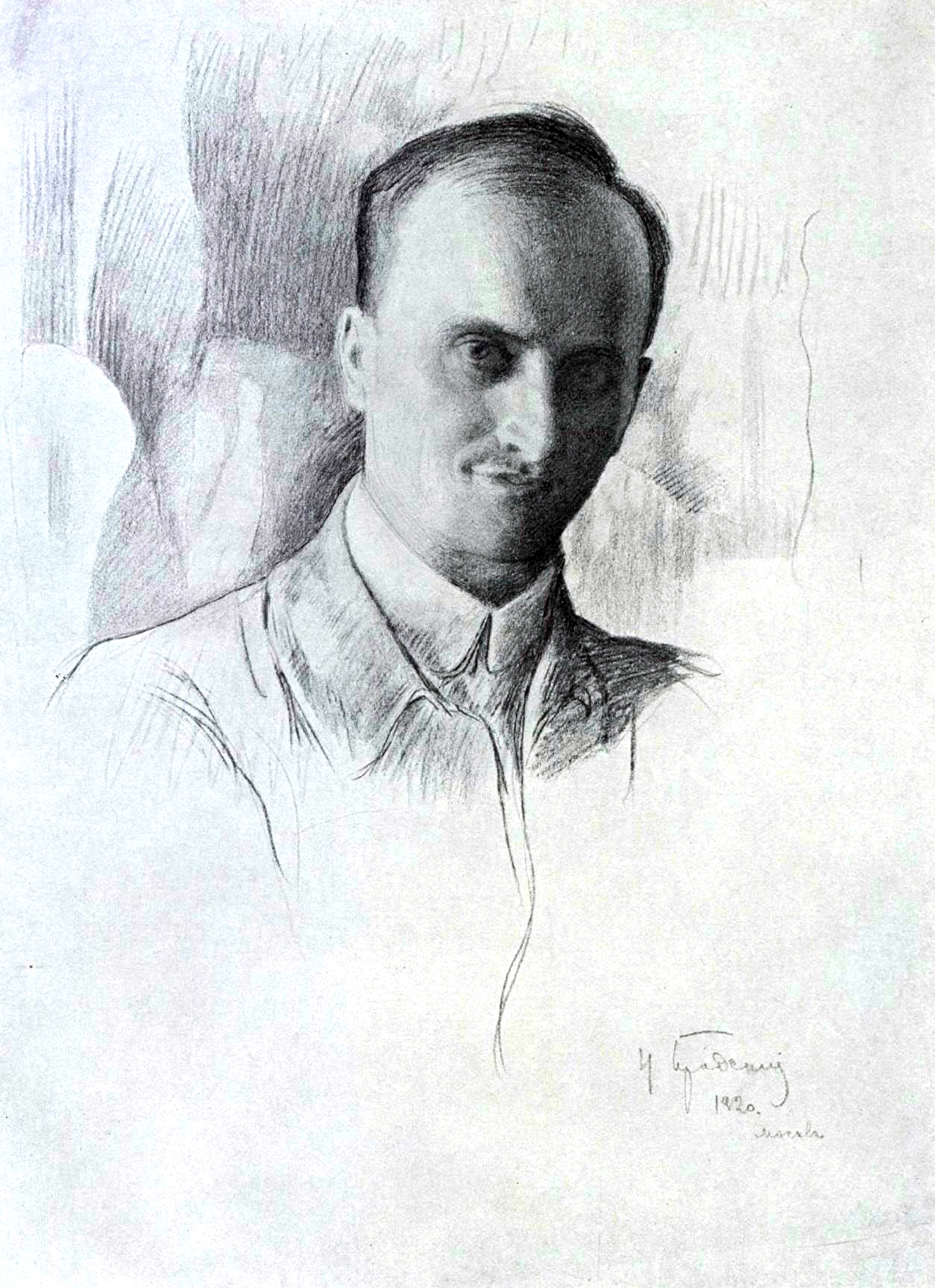
Brodskiy II Rudyanskiy

Endre Rudnyánszky (1885–1921 or 1943?) was a Hungarian lawyer, military officer, and communist. He held leadership posts in international and Hungarian communist organizations until his disappearance in 1921.

== Biography ==
=== Early years ===
Rudnyánszky was born in 1885 in Hungary. Rudnyánszky became a lawyer and was drafted into the Austro-Hungarian Army during the First World War. Serving as a cavalry officer, he was taken prisoner and by 1917 had embraced Bolshevism.

=== Political career ===
In Russia, he participated in the formation of the Hungarian Group within the Bolsheviks' Federation of Foreign Groups. He succeeded Béla Kun as chairman of the federation when the latter returned to Hungary in late 1918. Rudnyánszky signed the call for the creation of a Third International in January 1919 and in March was the only Hungarian at the founding congress of the Comintern.

When the Hungarian Soviet Republic was established (also in March 1919), Rudnyánszky became that government's representative in Moscow. In 1920, at the Second World Congress of the Comintern, he was elected to the organization's executive committee (ECCI) and served on its five-member presidium.

=== Disappearance and legacy ===
While still holding these positions, Endre Rudnyánszky failed to appear at the organization's Third Congress in June 1921, disappearing while in possession of significant Comintern funds. His disappearance was never explained and, according to Béla Kun, he was expelled in absentia from the party. However, according to Pierre Broué he had returned to the Soviet Union five years later and was imprisoned for fifteen years, allegedly remaining in Russia until he was last seen in 1943.

== See also ==
- List of people who disappeared
