= Chemical Workers' Union (United Kingdom) =

Former trade union of the United Kingdom

- Merged into: Transport and General Workers' Union
- Founded: 1918
- Dissolved: 1971
- Headquarters: 155 Kennington Park Road, London
- Location: United Kingdom
- Members: 3,376 (1926)
- Key people: Robert Edwards (General Secretary)

The Chemical Workers' Union was a trade union in the United Kingdom.

== History ==
The union was established in 1912 by a small group of pharmacists, as the Retail Chemists' Association. Most of its members were also members of the Pharmaceutical Society, and it focused on improving standards in the trade and limiting the number of apprentices. By 1918, it had only 447 members, and so it decided to become an industrial union, accepting all workers involved in producing and distributing drugs and chemicals. It changed its named to the Amalgamated Society of Pharmacists, Drug and Chemical Workers, and for the first time registered as a trade union.

In December 1918, the London wholesale drug workers' branch of the National Amalgamated Union of Shop Assistants, Warehousemen and Clerks, decided to dissolve and encourage its members to join the Chemical Workers. As it had 3,000 members, they quickly became prominent the Chemical Workers, with Fred Hawkins becoming its full-time organiser.

In 1920, the small National Association of Chemists' Assistants also joined the union, which became the National Union of Drug and Chemical Workers. It employed Herbert Nightingale as its first full-time general secretary, and launched a journal, the Drug Union News. However, it fell into financial difficulties, laying off Hawkins, and by the end of 1922, membership had fallen to only 2,500. Militant trade unionists won control of the executive.

In 1923, the union affiliated to the Trades Union Congress (TUC), but the Shop Assistants Union claimed it was a breakaway union and should return various "poached" members. The Chemical Workers were unwilling to do this, and so in 1924 again left the TUC. Nightingale resigned as general secretary, concerned he would lose an election, and former secretary of the London wholesale drug workers, Arthur Gillian, was elected as his replacement.

Under Gillian's leadership, the union grew a little, membership reaching 3,376 by 1926. The union strongly supported the UK general strike, and became strongly influenced by the Independent Labour Party, of which Gillian was a member, and the National Minority Movement, with Dick Beech and the employees of the Russian Oil Products Company playing a leading role.

In 1936, the union decided to try to become the sole union for chemical workers. It changed its name to the "Chemical Workers' Union", and again applied to affiliate to the TUC, but was rejected. It then reapplied each year, winning the support of the large majority of TUC affiliates, but due to the opposition of the large general unions, it was unable to secure admission until 1943.

In 1938, Bob Edwards joined the union, soon becoming an organiser. During World War II, he led significant industrial action during World War II, while many other unions refused to do so. Membership grew, and by 1943 reached 22,000, with the union particularly strong at ICI. In 1961, the union absorbed the National Union of Atomic Workers, which had formed in the 1950s as a breakaway from the Transport and General Workers Union.

The union merged into the Transport and General Workers' Union in 1971.

== General Secretaries ==
1912: E. N. Lloyd
1920: Herbert Nightingale
1924: Arthur J. Gillan
1947: Robert Edwards
