= Ivan Nedelkov =

Bulgarian political activist (1881–1925)

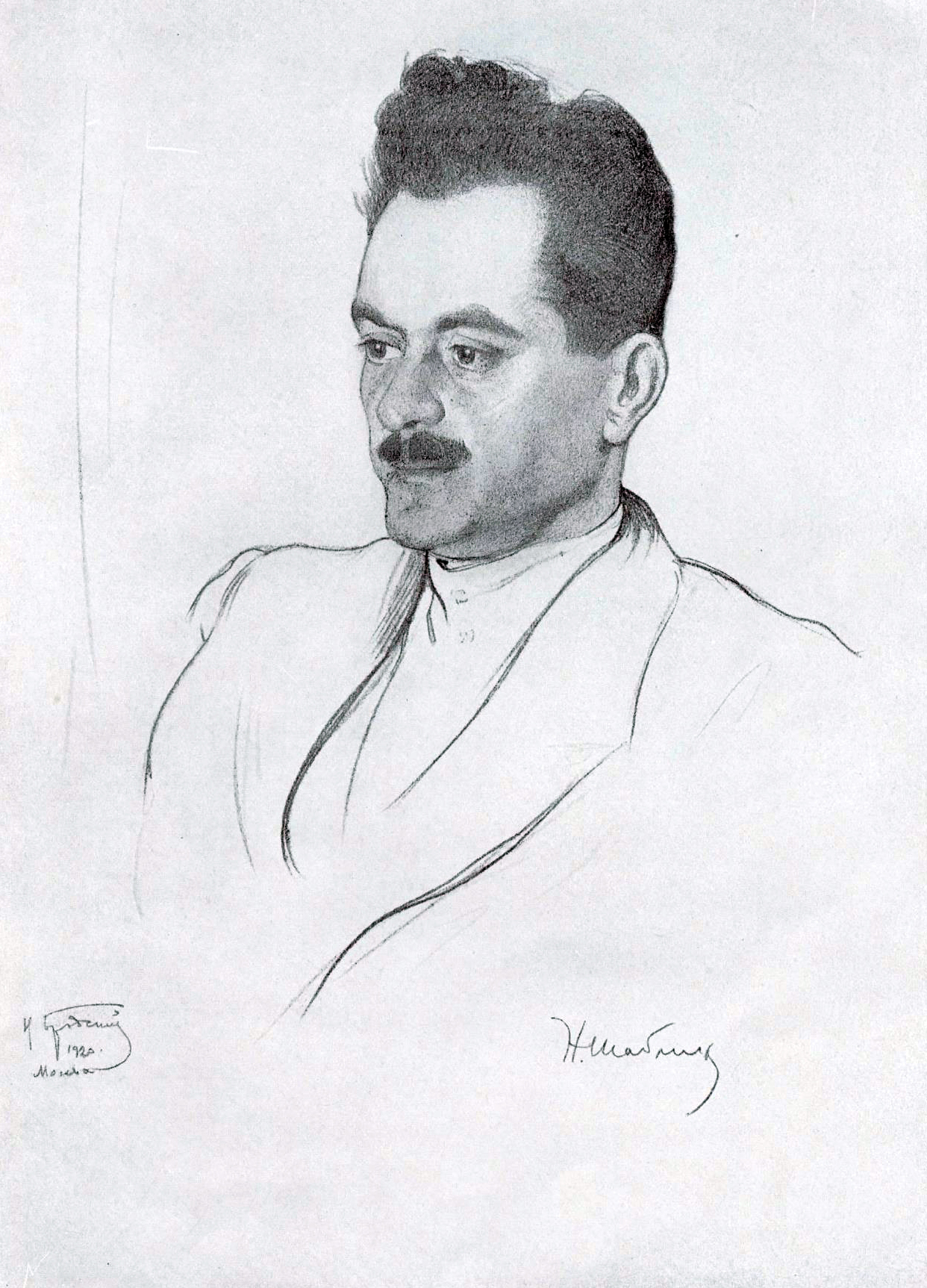
"Shablin" (1920)

Ivan Nedelkov Shablin (Bulgarian: Иван Неделков, also known as "N. Shablin") (1881 - 1925) was a Bulgarian political activist.

== Life ==
Ivan Shablin was born on January 4, 1881, in the city of Radomir. He graduated from the Telegraph School. He became a member of the Bulgarian Social Democratic Workers' Party (Narrow Socialists) in 1897.

He worked as a telegraphist. For his involvement in the Transport Strike (1919-1920) he was fired.

He took part in the Bulgarian Workers' Social Democratic Party before becoming a founder member of the Bulgarian Communist Party in 1919. After the St Nedelya Church assault in 1925, the Bulgarian police murdered him, perhaps by burning him alive.

== See also ==
- List of delegates of the 2nd Comintern congress
