= Karl Steinhardt =

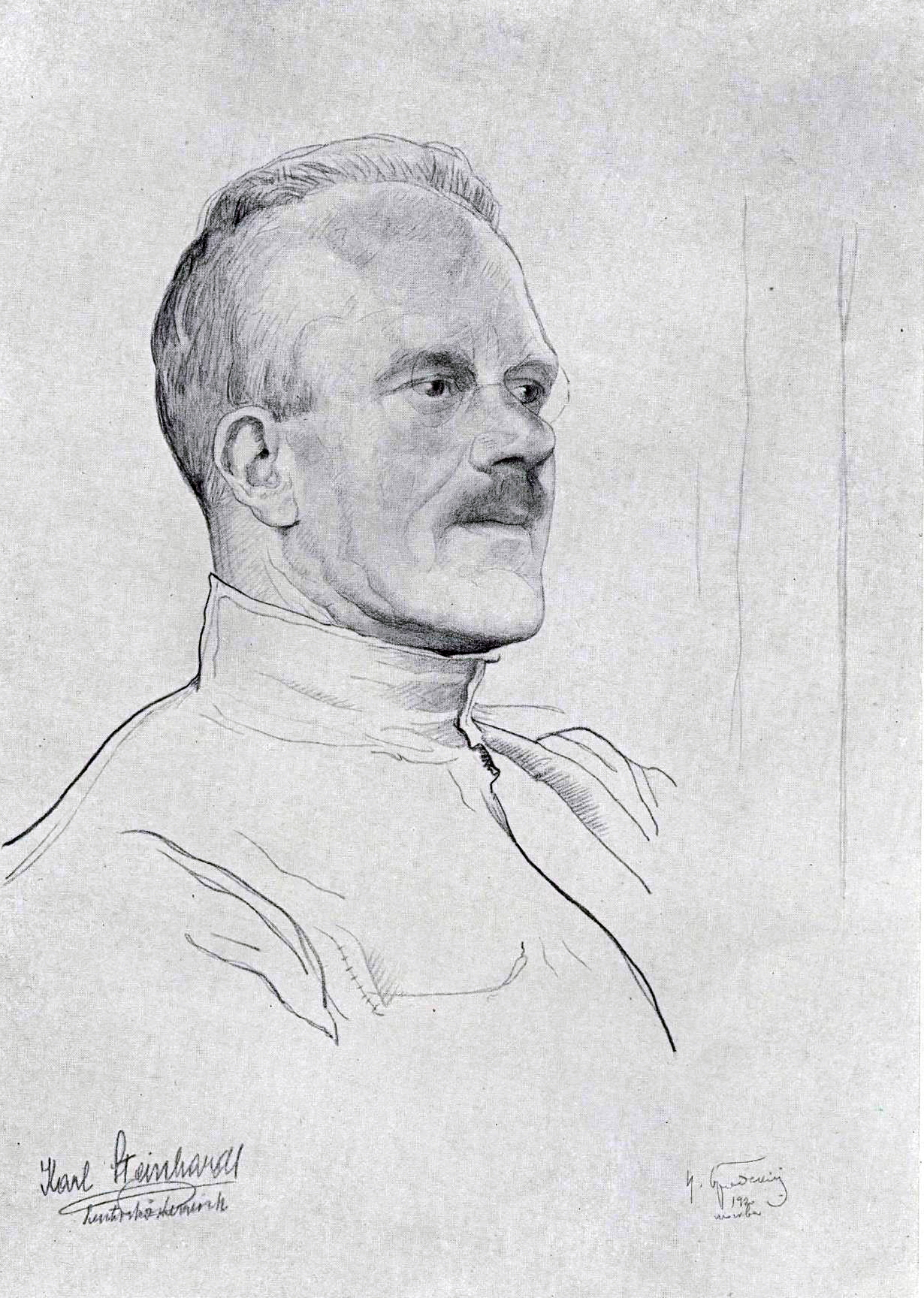
Portrait of Steinhardt at the Second World Congress of the Comintern. By I. Brodsky

Karl Steinhardt (1 August 1875, Gyöngyös — 21 January 1963, Vienna) was an Austrian politician and activist who was one of the founders and leaders of the Communist Party of Austria.

== Biography ==
Born in Gyöngyös in the Austro-Hungarian Empire in to the family of an officer of a hussar regiment. After graduating from his apprenticeship as a printer he became a member of the Social Democratic Party of Austria in 1894. He continued his work as a printer throughout Europe and eventually settled in Hamburg where he was later expelled for his political activities. He went to Vienna in 1913 and became fully committed to political activism until he was expelled from the SDAPÖ for during the First World War for his internationalist stance and anti-war propaganda.

Steinhardt and his "Communist Group" alongside other political radicals such as Ruth Fischer who were formerly members of the Social Democratic Party founded the Communist Party of Austria. In 1919 he was elected to the leadership if the party and became a delegate to the First Congress of the Communist International. Upon his return to Vienna the plane he was a passenger of was shot down in Romaniac and he was arrested for espionage. At first he was sentenced to death however it was later revoked and Steinhardt was sentenced to forced labor instead. After he managed to get in contact with the International Red Cross he was set free and returned to Vienna.

Steinhardt was also a delegate of the Second and Third World Congresses of the Comintern and was elected to its Executive Committee. He was also a delegate at the Congress of the Peoples of the East.

In 1921 he traveled to Bremen and worked for the Communist Party of Germany and its publications. He was expelled from the Bremen committee of the KPD and later traveled to Hamburg where he worked in the Soviet trade agency until he was once again expelled from Hamburg and went on to work for the Soviet trade agency in Berlin. In 1925 he was expelled from Germany and re settled in Vienna where he worked as a district activist for the KPÖ.

After the Nazi annexation of Austria Steinhardt returned to his work as a printer. He was arrested by the Gestapo for multiple times and was under surveillance.

After the Soviet liberation of Austria Steinhardt was appointed deputy mayor of Vienna. From 1945 to 1949 he was a member of the Gemeinderat and Landtag of Vienna for the KPÖ and was also elected to the central committee of the party. In 1945 he was also for a period head of the Welfare Department of Austria.

Karl Steinhardt died on 21 January 1963 in Vienna.
