= Sverre Krogh (editor) =

Norwegian actuary, politician and contributing editor (1883–1957)

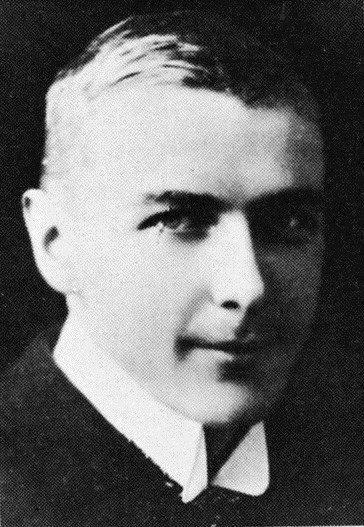
Sverre Krogh

Sverre Krogh (11 March 1883 – 26 October 1957) was a Norwegian actuary, newspaper editor and politician for the Labour and Communist Labour parties. He later became a Nazi, working for Norwegian and German Nazis during the Second World War.

== Early life and labour movement ==
He was born in Kristiania as a son of Colonel Gerhard Christopher Krogh (1839–1916) and Thora Regine Clementine Angelica Neumann (1856–1928). He studied at the University of Karlsruhe and the University of Göttingen, graduating as an actuary in 1905. He worked for a while as an actuary, but was a radical writer and member of the Norwegian labour movement. He was sentenced to three months in prison for revolutionary trade union propaganda in 1908, and to four months in jail for antimilitarist agitation in 1912. In 1920 he was convicted as responsible for the physical assault by some workers on Henrik Ameln; they had attended a meeting where Krogh called for revolutionary actions.

In 1912 he was hired as subeditor in the Labour Party newspaper Arbeidet. He was promoted to editor-in-chief in 1918. In 1920 he was a delegate (for Norges Socialdemokratiske Ungdomsforbund) at the Second Comintern Congress. In the press he defended the Twenty-one Conditions. He was also a member of Fana municipal council from 1916 to 1922, and was elected to the Parliament of Norway from Hordaland in 1921 and 1924. His last term ended in 1927. He stood for election in 1927, and was the communist candidate who came closest to winning a seat without actually winning (three others managed to win a seat). He had joined the Communist Party in 1923, and stepped down as editor of Arbeidet in 1924.

== Nazi period ==
He later joined the Fascist party Nasjonal Samling, being persuaded by Birger Meidell. He found work during the occupation of Norway by Nazi Germany as a consultant in the Norwegian Ministry of Culture and Enlightenment from 1940 to 1941. When the Nazis usurped control over the Norwegian Confederation of Trade Unions, they formed a group of former labour movementarians-turned-Nazis. Krogh was an informer for the Sicherheitspolizei from 1941 to 1944, especially of situations in the trade unions.

From 1943 he was an office manager in Granskningskommisjonen av 1943, a commission that was tasked with scrutinizing the actions of Nygaardsvold's Cabinet prior to the war, and thus find legal grounds for the Nazi usurpation of power.

In 1948, during the legal purge in Norway after World War II, Krogh was tried and convicted of treason and sentenced to two years and three months of forced labour.
