= Burhan Mansurov =

Tatar revolutionary and Soviet politician

- Борһан Мансуров

Chairman of the Central Executive Committee of the Tatar ASSR
- In office 1920–1921
- Preceded by: Position established
- Succeeded by: Rauf Sabirov

Personal details
- Born: 24 June 1889 Staroye Zelenoe, Khvalynsky Uyezd, Saratov Governorate, Russian Empire
- Died: 15 August 1942 (aged 53) Moscow, Russian Soviet Federative Socialist Republic, Soviet Union
- Party: RSDLP (Bolsheviks) (1917–1918); All-Union Communist Party (Bolsheviks) (1918–1942)

Burhan Mansurov (Tatar: Борһан Хөснетдин улы Мансуров, Borhan Xösnetdin ulı Mansurov, Russian: Бурхан Хуснутдинович Мансуров, Burkhan Khusnutdinovich Mansurov; 24 June 1889 – 15 August 1942) was a Tatar revolutionary and Soviet politician.

== Biography ==
=== Early revolutionary career ===
Mansurov was born in to the family of a rural mullah and began his studies at his father's madrasah. At the age of 11 he was sent to Astrakhan, where he was forced to combine his studies with work. There he met representatives of the city's progressive intelligentsia, read revolutionary literature and participated in illegal meetings.

He began his revolutionary activities in 1905 with the distribution of leaflets and proclamations among Tatar workers. In 1906, he participated in the publication of the underground revolutionary newspaper "Uygatu" ("Awakening"). For his revolutionary activity, he was persecuted by the police and the clergy, and was forced to leave the madrasah. Having left for the steppe regions of the province, he conducted revolutionary propaganda among the Kazakhs, and then returned to his homeland, going to work as a teacher in a zemstvo school.

In 1907, he left for Kazan and entered the Tatar school "Mardzhaniya", from where he was soon expelled for agitation work among students. For some time he worked as a teacher in a madrasah in Novotatarskaya Sloboda. During this period, he met Tatar Bolsheviks such as Xösäyen Yamaşev, Mingaz Konov and others, who carried out propaganda among the Tatar workers of the Utyamyshev and Krestovnikov factories. Having come under police surveillance, in 1908 he was forced to leave for Astrakhan, where he joined an underground organization, while simultaneously working in the legal newspaper Idel, from where he was expelled a year later for revolutionary articles. After this and until 1915, working as a teacher, he traveled around the Astrakhan, Saratov, Petrograd, Tobolsk provinces, and Akmola region. From 1915 to 1917 he participated in construction work on the Murmansk Railway, where he also conducted political campaigning.

=== Tatar Soviet leader ===
After the October Revolution, Mansurov traveled to Petrograd, where he took part in the organization of the Central Muslim Commissariat, in which he headed the labor department. In June 1918, at a meeting of Muslim communists, he was elected to the Central Committee of the organization. Soon he took the post of editor of the newspaper "Communism Bayragy" ("Banner of Communism"), then editor of the newspapers "Hurriyat" ("Freedom") and "Kyzyl Shimal" ("Red North"). He organized a communist faction in the Petrograd Muslim Commissariat and led the fight against the pro-nationalist majority of the Commissariat.

In 1919, by order of the Central Committee of the Russian Communist Party, he was sent to Moscow, where he began to edit the central organ of the Communist Organization of the Peoples of the East (KOVN), the newspaper "Eshche", while simultaneously being the chairman of the section of the Communists of the East under the Moscow Committee of the RCP (b) and deputy chairman of the Central Muslim Commissariat under the People's Commissariat of Nationalities. He was also a delegate at the Founding Congress of the Communist International.

In November 1919, as a delegate, he attended the Second Congress of Communist Organizations of the Peoples of the East, at which he was elected to the Central Bank of the KOVN under the Central Committee of the RCP (b) and began working as head of the publishing department. Together with Sahib Said-Galiyev, he organized the translation of Marxist literature into Tatar, Azerbaijani, Persian, Kazakh, Uzbek and other oriental languages.

During the formation of the Tatar Autonomous Soviet Socialist Republic, as part of a delegation headed by Said-Galiyev, he was received by Vladimir Lenin, who asked the delegates about the economy, cultural issues, and was interested in their proposals for the formation of the Tatar Republic. After the proclamation of the Tatar Republic, he took a direct part in strengthening Soviet power on the territory of the TASSR, in the preparation and holding of the founding republican congress of Soviets of workers, peasants and Red Army deputies. At the first meeting of the Central Executive Committee of the TASSR (TatTSIK) elected at the congress, Mansurov was elected the first chairman of its Presidium.

He held the post of member of the All-Russian Central Executive Committee of the RSFSR and participated in the work of the All-Russian Congresses of Soviets and the Tenth Congress of the RCP (b). At the end of June 1921, he was recalled to the apparatus of the Central Committee of the RCP (b), and then appointed editor of the all-Russian newspaper "Igencheler" ("Grain Growers"). During the same years, he collaborated with multiple other magazine such as "Fen Ham Din" ("Science and Religions"), was a member of the editorial board of the magazines "Yash eshche" ("Young Worker") and "Kechkene iptashler" ("Young Comrades"), and was active in on educating young journalists (among his students was Musa Jalil).

=== Later life and death ===
From 1937, he was suffering with serious illness but did not retire. After the German invasion of the Soviet Union, he was sent to the forest department in Vedogush, Moscow region, to organize the preparation of firewood for Moscow. He died there in August 1942.
