= Břetislav Hůla =

Czech Communist politician

Břetislav Hůla (30 March 1894 – 2 April 1964) was a Czech Communist politician, newspaper editor, and translator. He was a leading cadre of Comintern in 1923–24. A National Labor Confederation member, he joined the Bolshevik party in 1917, and was responsible for organizing its Czech section after 1918. A delegate to the Second Comintern Congress (1920), he was excluded from Communist Party of Czechoslovakia in 1925, ostensibly for rightist leanings. After withdrawing from politics he worked as a translator from Russian and German. In 1947 he was commissioned by publisher Adolf Synek to collect and publish the writing of his one time friend Jaroslav Hašek, a task he continued also after the 1948 Communist coup, now on behalf of the Ministry of Information.
