= Barsov =

Barsov (Russian: Барсов, from барс meaning leopard) is a Russian masculine surname, its feminine counterpart is Barsova. It may refer to:

- Nickname of Georgian communist Mikhail Tskhakaya (1865–1950)
- Alexei Barsov (born 1966), Uzbekistani chess grandmaster
- Elpidifor Barsov (1836–1917), Russian literary historian, ethnographer, folklorist, archeologist and philologist
- Maksim Barsov (born 1993), Russian football forward
- Valeria Barsova (1892–1967), Russian operatic soprano
