= Executive Committee of the Communist International =

Governing authority of the Comintern (1919 to 1943)

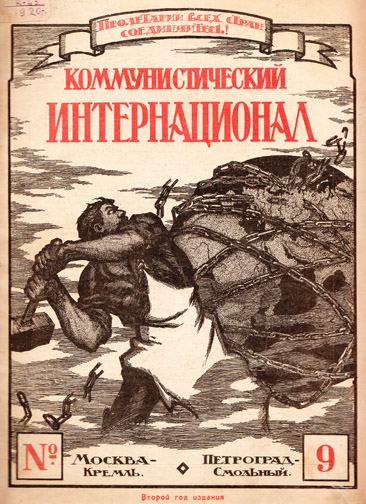
The magazine The Communist International, the official organ of ECCI, was initially published in Russian, French, German, and English editions

The Executive Committee of the Communist International, commonly known by its acronym, ECCI (Russian acronym ИККИ for Исполнительный комитет Коммунистического интернационала), was the governing authority of the Comintern between the World Congresses of that body. The ECCI, established by the Founding Congress of the Comintern in 1919, was dissolved with the rest of the Comintern in May 1943.

== Organizational history ==
=== Establishment ===
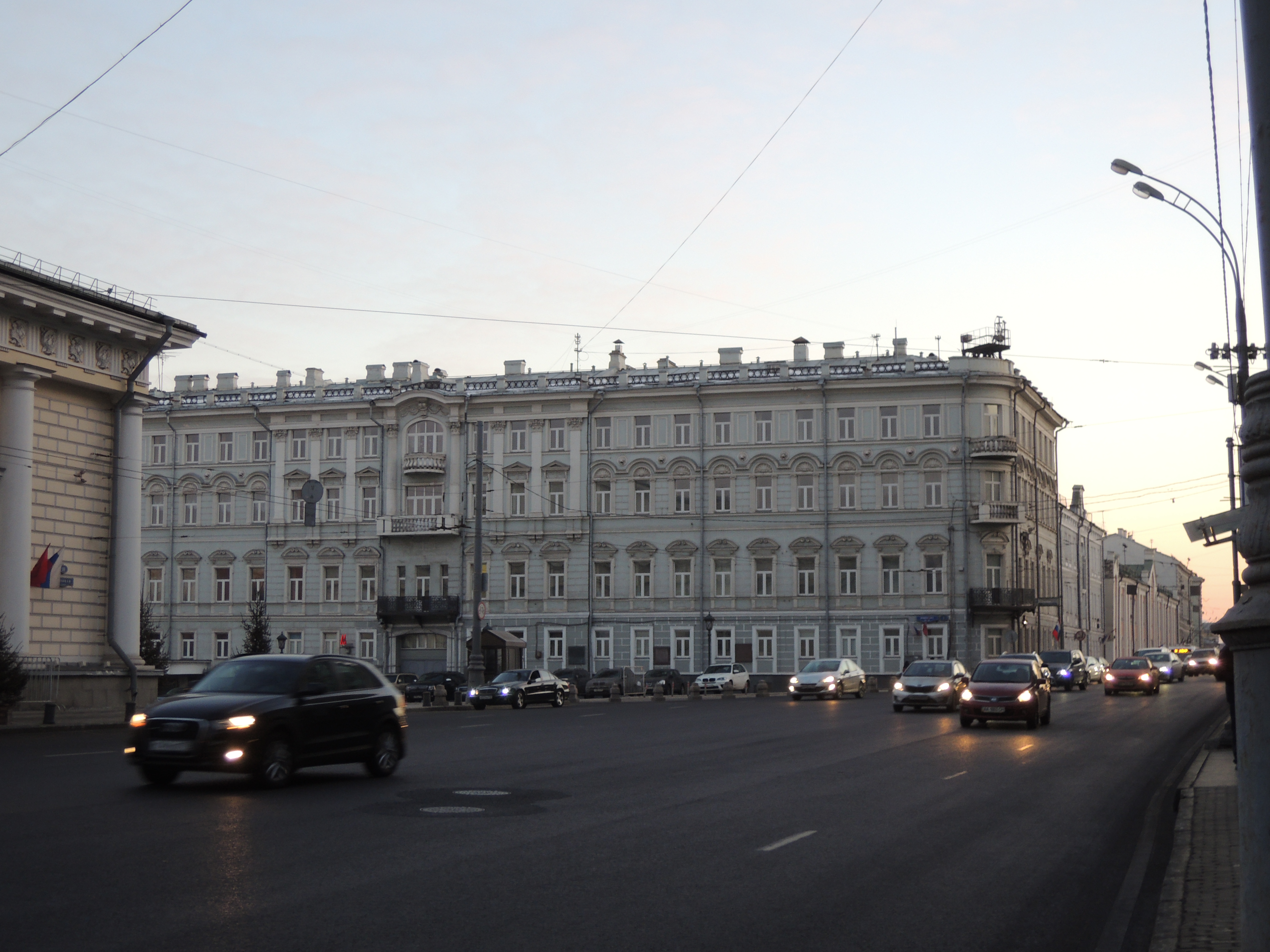
ECCI building on Vozdvizhenka Street

The Communist International was established at a gathering convened in Moscow at the behest of the Russian Communist Party (Bolsheviks). As early as December 24, 1918, a radio appeal had been issued by the ruling party of Soviet Russia calling on "communists of all countries" to boycott any attempts of reformists to reestablish the Second International, but to instead "rally around the revolutionary Third International." The formal call for a conference of revolutionary socialist political parties and radical trade unions espousing revolutionary industrial unionism had been issued on January 24, 1919, with the gathering originally slated to commence in Moscow beginning on February 15.

The conference which ultimately declared itself the Founding Congress of the Communist International was postponed to March 2, 1919, owing to the difficulties entailed by foreign delegates in crossing the blockade of Soviet Russia established by the Allied Nations at the end of World War I. Only a comparatively few delegates did manage to make the trip, with a number of the places filled on an ad hoc basis by individuals already in Soviet Russia not bearing formal credentials from their home organizations. For example, Boris Reinstein, a druggist from Buffalo, New York who sat ostensibly as the delegate of the Socialist Labor Party of America, had been away from home for two years and had no formal authorization to represent his party. Similarly, Endre Rudnyánszky, a former prisoner of war stranded in Russia represented Hungary, while Christian Rakovsky, a Romanian, sat for the nearly defunct Balkan Socialist Federation.

A commission (standing committee) chaired by the Swiss radical Fritz Platten was appointed by this Founding Congress to construct an organizational apparatus for the new Third International. This commission recommended the establishment of two deliberative bodies, an Executive Committee, to handle matters of policy, and a 5-member Bureau, to handle day-to-day activities. The governing Executive Committee was to be headquartered in Moscow and to include representatives from the member organizations of the Communist International. The parties of Russia, Germany, Austria, Hungary, the Balkan Federation, Switzerland, and Scandinavia were each to "immediately send representatives to the first Executive Committee." All parties joining the Comintern before the convention of the 2nd World Congress were similarly to be allowed a representative on this body. Until the arrival of the various elected delegates, representatives of the Russian Communist Party were to perform the functions of this Executive Committee of the Communist International. This organizational plan was approved unanimously by the Congress, without debate.

Selected as President of ECCI was Grigorii Zinoviev, an old associate of V. I. Lenin and top figure in the Russian Communist Party. Karl Radek, then ensconced in a Berlin prison, was symbolically selected as Secretary of ECCI, although the actual functions fell to Angelica Balabanov, albeit only for a few weeks. Zinoviev also served as editor of the official magazine of ECCI, Kommunisticheskii Internatsional ("The Communist International"), which began appearing regularly as soon as the Founding Congress came to a close.

Although no more than the nucleus of an actual organization was created, hampered by difficult communications in the isolation of the blockade, the skeleton ECCI immediately began to issues a series of declarations and manifestos to the workers and nations of the world. These included a manifesto of ECCI to the workers and sailors of all countries on the Hungarian Revolution (March 28, 1919), a message to the Bavarian Soviet Republic (April 1919), a May Day manifesto (April 20, 1919), a manifesto on the Versailles Peace (May 13, 1919), and a manifesto on foreign intervention in Soviet Russia (June 18, 1919).

The early ECCI was, in short, to a large extent a propaganda body, aiming to stir the working class to socialist revolution. In the estimation of historian E. H. Carr, the summer and fall of 1920 marked the high-water mark for the prestige of the Comintern and its hopes of promoting world revolution. There would be, however, other functions for the organization and the executive committee which directed it.

=== From provisional to permanent status ===
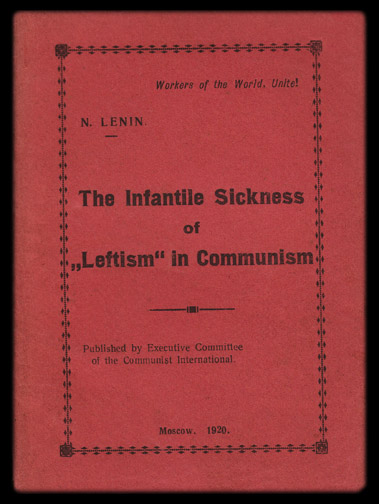
Delegates to the 2nd World Congress of the Comintern received a copy of Lenin's new book The Infantile Sickness of "Leftism" in Communism, published by ECCI.

Owing to poor communications and the difficulty of individuals crossing the frontier during the blockade and civil war, of those originally invited to participate only the Communist Party of Hungary was able to send its permanent representative to ECCI prior to the convocation of the 2nd World Congress of the Comintern on July 19, 1920. This did not mean that ECCI, the Comintern's directing body, was staffed exclusively with Russians during the 1919-1920 period, however. In addition to representatives of the Russian Communist Party Angelica Balabanova, Jan Antonovich Berzin, Nikolai Bukharin, V. V. Vorovsky, Grigorii Zinoviev, and G. Klinger, a number of radicals from around the world had at various times taken part in ECCI's activities. Among this group were László Rudas of Hungary, Jacques Sadoul of France, John Reed of the Communist Labor Party of America, John Anderson (Kristap Beika) of the Communist Party of America, S. J. Rutgers of the Netherlands, in addition to others from Korea, China, Norway, Sweden, Yugoslavia, Poland, and Finland.

During this interval the Comintern, through ECCI and the permanent staff of the organization, began to fund the various communist parties of the world, attempting to add practical support to the literary fusillade which emanated from Moscow. Over time this financial aid provided by the Comintern would help to bind the various national parties to the central body. Still, it would be facile to reduce loyalty to the Comintern and its governing body, ECCI, to mere finances. The array of national communist parties saw themselves in a very real sense as national subdivisions of a single world party and they accepted centralization as a matter of principle and direction in revolutionary strategy and tactics from Moscow, the home of the only successful proletarian revolution as logical and natural.

Although Jane Degras in an appendix to her 1956 three volume compendium of Comintern documents intimates that the 2nd World Congress of the Comintern directly elected the membership of ECCI, the stenographic proceedings of the congress published in 1991 indicates that this was not actually the case. At the close of the final regular session of the congress, held on August 6, 1920, a list of ECCI participants was hurriedly discussed and adopted by a vote of the delegates. Russia, by virtue of the size and importance of its party, was allocated five delegates on the executive committee, to be joined by one delegate each from the following nations: Great Britain, Germany, France, the United States, Italy, Austria, Hungary, Bulgaria, Yugoslavia, Scandinavia, the Netherlands, Poland, Finland, the Far East (Korea), and the Middle East (Iran). No specific individuals were voted upon by the assembled delegates.

This decision seems to have been rapidly modified by ECCI itself after conclusion of the congress, as Degras lists by name a 26-member body that was in place over the course of the next year. Included, in addition to the five Russian delegates, were two Americans (one each from the rival Communist Party of America and the Communist Labor Party of America), two delegates from the Netherlands, as well as one delegate each from Germany, France, Great Britain, Italy, Czechoslovakia, Austria, Scandinavia, Bulgaria, Yugoslavia, the "Far East" (Korea), the "Near East" (Iran), Finland, Poland, Hungary, Georgia, Java (Indonesia), plus one representative of the Young Communist International.

In the aftermath of the 2nd Word Congress, a five-member "little bureau" was also chosen to coordinate the day-to-day activities of the Comintern. This group included the Russians Zinoviev, Bukharin, and Mikhail Kobetsky, the Hungarian Rudniansky, and the German Ernst Meyer. The composition of this "little bureau" was presumably named by ECCI itself. This bureau was enlarged in 1921 by the 3rd World Congress of the Comintern by the addition to these five of the Hungarian Béla Kun, Alfred Rosmer of France, Bernard Koenen of Germany, and the Polish-born Soviet citizen Karl Radek. The Comintern also maintained an extensive staff of professional functionaries.

The 3rd World Congress of the Comintern, held in Moscow from June 22 through July 12, 1921, did not directly elect an executive committee of the Comintern, as did its predecessor. Instead, it decided that the four parties which had been allocated 40 votes at the congress should send two delegates to ECCI, and the 14 parties with 20 to 30 votes should send one delegate. By virtue of its size and status, the Russian Communist Party was allocated five delegates to ECCI, while all other parties were to be entitled to a consultative voice on the committee, but no decisive vote.

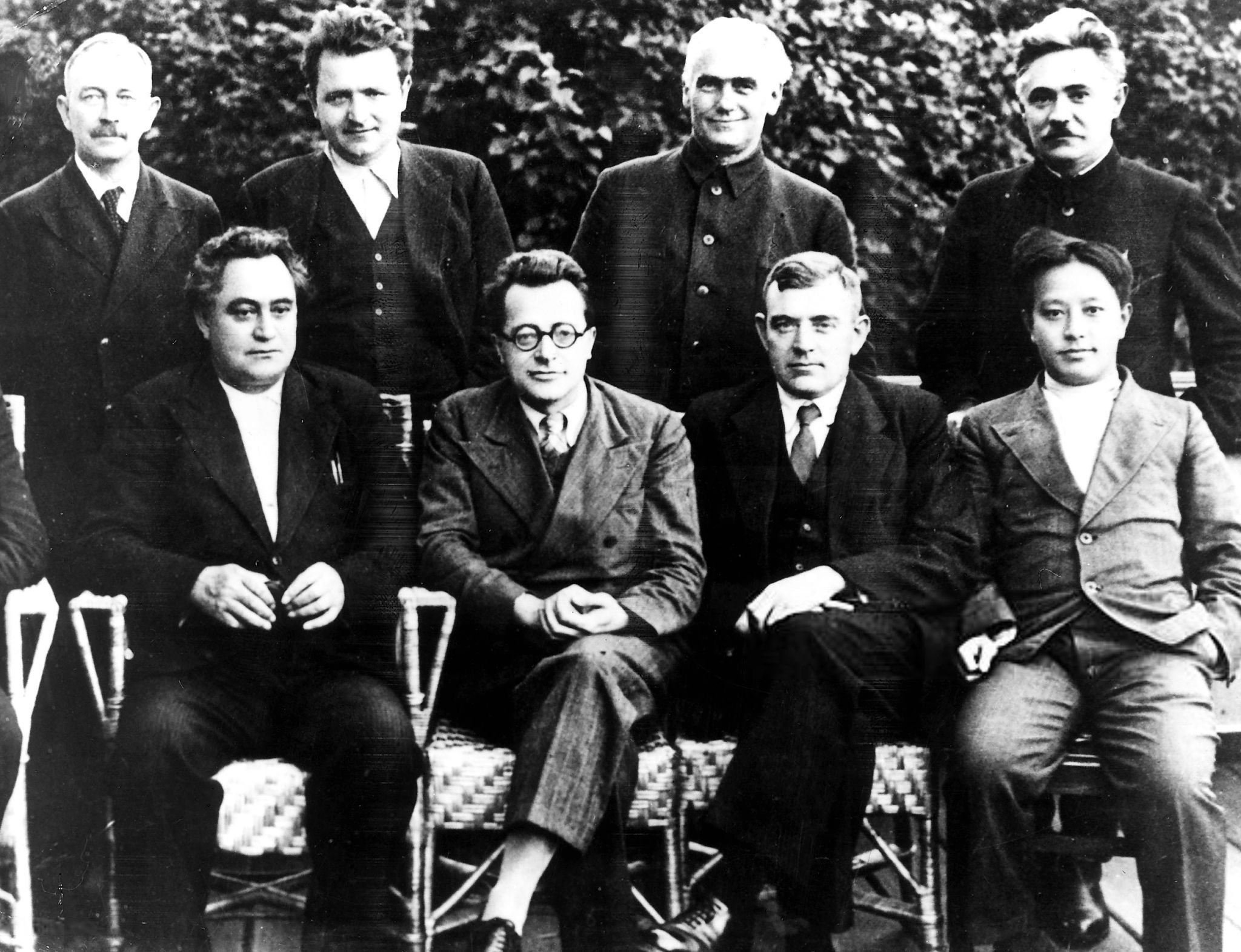
Members of the Executive Committee at the 7th World Congress of the Comintern, 1935. Seated (L-R): Georgi Dimitrov, Palmiro Togliatti, Wilhelm Florin, Wang Ming. Standing: Otto Kuusinen, Klement Gottwald, Wilhelm Pieck, Dmitry Manuilsky.

ECCI was subsequently enlarged in 1921-22, as new Communist Parties were allotted delegates with consultative votes while other parties were allowed a second vote. The countries exercising two votes on ECCI at the time of the 4th World Congress of the Comintern late in 1922 were Germany, France, Czechoslovakia, Finland, and the United States.

Although not originally envisioned as such, formal gatherings of the "Enlarged Executive Committee of the Communist International" rapidly came to supplant the World Congresses of the Comintern.

The 4th World Congress established the Organization Bureau ("Orgburo") of the Comintern. This committee controlled placement of Comintern cadres throughout the world and supervised international agitation and propaganda work, leaving political questions to ECCI. The Comintern Orgburo was patterned after a similar institution in the Russian Communist Party that had been established in March 1919.

The Zinoviev letter, purporting to be instructions to British communists to begin preparations for revolution, is on its face written as a letter from the ECCI on 15 September 1924. Although validated as genuine by the Secret Intelligence Service at the time, the letter is now accepted by the British government to have been a forgery.

=== The loss of autonomy ===
It was the Political Secretariat of the Comintern that de facto governed the Comintern, in Stalinist era intended to be an instrument of Soviet foreign policy.

Subordination of national Communist Parties to the Communist International was complete: in any given country there can be only one Communist Party affiliated to the Communist International and each represented a Section of the Communist International in that country. The decisions of the ECCI were obligatory for all the Sections of the Communist International. And although the Sections had the right to appeal against decisions of the ECCI to the World Congress, they had to execute them, pending the decision of the World Congress. On the other hand, ECCI had the right “to expel from the Communist International, entire Sections, groups and individual members who violate the program and rules of the Communist International or the decisions of the World Congress and of the ECCI”.

=== Dissolution ===
The Communist International was dissolved by resolution of the Presidium of the ECCI, May 22, 1943.

=== Plenums of ECCI ===
Event	Year held	Dates	Location	Delegates
1st Enlarged Plenum of ECCI	1922	Feb. 24 to March 4	Moscow	105
2nd Enlarged Plenum of ECCI	1922	June 7–11	Moscow	41 + 9
3rd Enlarged Plenum of ECCI	1923	June 12–23	Moscow	
4th Enlarged Plenum of ECCI	1924	June 12 and July 12–13	Moscow	
5th Enlarged Plenum of ECCI	1925	March 21 to April 6	Moscow	
6th Enlarged Plenum of ECCI	1926	Feb. 17 to March 15	Moscow	77 + 53
7th Enlarged Plenum of ECCI	1926	Nov. 22 to Dec. 16	Moscow	
8th Enlarged Plenum of ECCI	1927	May 18–30	Moscow	
9th Enlarged Plenum of ECCI	1928	February 9–25	Moscow	44 + 48
10th Enlarged Plenum of ECCI	1929	July 3–19	Moscow	36 + 72
Enlarged Presidium of ECCI	1930	February 25-??	Moscow	
11th Enlarged Plenum of ECCI	1931	March 26 to April 11	Moscow	
12th Enlarged Plenum of ECCI	1932	Aug. 27 to Sept. 15	Moscow	38 + 136
13th Enlarged Plenum of ECCI	1933	Nov. 28 to Dec. 12	Moscow	

== Important members of ECCI ==
- Tom Bell, Great Britain.
- Jan Antonovich Berzin, USSR.
- Amadeo Bordiga, Italy.
- Earl Browder, USA.
- Tim Buck, Canada.
- Nikolai Bukharin, USSR.
- Marcel Cachin, France.
- Georgii Dimitrov, Bulgaria.
- Milan Gorkić, Yugoslavia.
- Jacques Duclos, France.
- William Z. Foster, USA.
- Willie Gallacher, Great Britain.
- Klement Gottwald, Czechoslovakia.
- Antonio Gramsci, Italy.
- Sergey Ivanovich Gusev, USSR
- Ho Chi Minh, Vietnam
- Jules Humbert-Droz, Switzerland.
- Lev Kamenev, USSR.
- Sen Katayama, Japan.
- L. E. Katterfeld, USA
- Vasil Kolarov, Bulgaria.
- Béla Kun, Hungary.
- Otto Kuusinen, Finland.
- James Larkin, Ireland.
- Jay Lovestone, USA.
- A. Lozovsky, USSR.
- Arthur MacManus, Great Britain.
- Dmitrii Manuilsky, USSR.
- Mao Zedong, China.
- André Marty, France.
- V.M. Molotov, USSR.
- Willi Münzenberg, Germany.
- Walton Newbold, Great Britain.
- Alois Neurath, Czechoslovakia
- Osip Piatnitsky, USSR.
- Wilhelm Pieck, Germany.
- Harry Pollitt, Great Britain.
- Karl Radek, USSR.
- Mátyás Rákosi, Hungary.
- John Reed, USA.
- Alfred Rosmer, France.
- M.N. Roy, India.
- László Rudas, Hungary.
- C.E. Ruthenberg, USA.
- Yrjö Sirola, Finland
- Bohumir Smeral, Czechoslovakia.
- Boris Souvarine, France.
- Joseph Stalin, USSR.
- Pēteris Stučka, Latvia.
- Ernst Thaelmann, Germany.
- Maurice Thorez, France.
- Palmiro Togliatti, Italy.
- Mikhail Tomsky, USSR.
- Leon Trotsky, USSR.
- Wang Ming, China.
- David Wijnkoop, Netherlands.
- Clara Zetkin, Germany.
- Grigorii Zinoviev, USSR.
- Zhou Enlai, China.

== See also ==
- Communist Women's International
- Young Communist International
- Red International of Labour Unions
- Krestintern
- International Red Aid
- International Worker's Relief
