= Socialist Workers' Party of China =

Former political party in China

- Founded: January 1919
- Dissolved: 1922
- Ideology: Communism

Socialist Workers' Party of China (Chinese: 中国社会主义工人党; pinyin: Zhōngguó shèhuì zhǔyì gōngrén dǎng), was a political party, formed by Chinese workers in Russia in January 1919. Its founders were active in the Union of Chinese Workers.
