= Gustav Klinger =

Russian Bolshevik politician (1876–1937?)

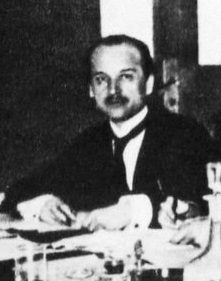
- Gustav Klinger in Moscow in 1919

Chairman of the Volga German Autonomous Soviet Socialist Republic
- In office Early-1918 – October 1918
- Succeeded by: Ernst Reuter

Personal details
- Party: Bolsheviks

Gustav Klinger (1876 – 1937? or 1943) was a Russian Bolshevik politician. Klinger joined the Party in 1917 in time for the revolution and was leader of the Volga German Soviet government 1918. He became business manager for the newly founded Communist International in 1919, and was elected to the Comintern Executive Committee in 1920. Klinger held various governmental posts in the Soviet Union during the 1920s. He was eventually killed during the Stalinist purges, probably in 1937.

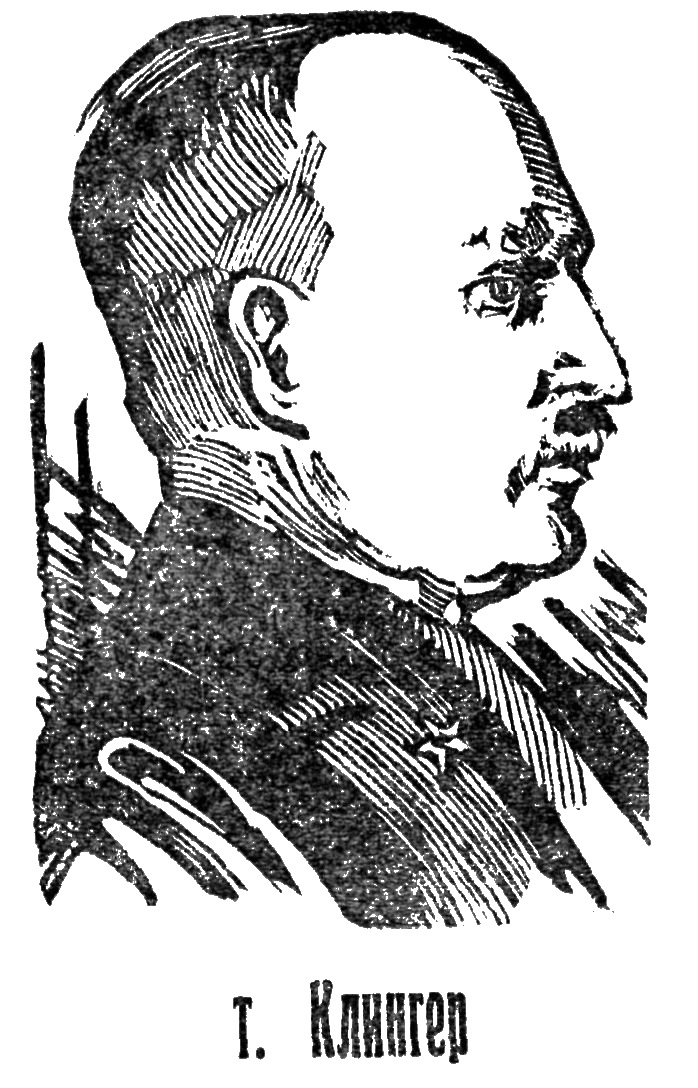
Gustav Klinger. Drawing from the Buryat-Mongolian newspaper Pravda, March 1925
