= 2nd World Congress of the Communist International =

1920 international congress in Moscow

2nd World Congress of the Communist International Второй конгресс Коммунистического интернационала
- Begins: July 19, 1920
- Ends: August 7, 1920
- Venue: Kremlin
- Location: Moscow
- Country: Russian Soviet Federative Socialist Republic
- Previous event: 1st Congress
- Next event: 3rd Congress
- Participants: 218 delegates from 54 parties

The 2nd World Congress of the Communist International was a gathering of approximately 220 voting and non-voting representatives of communist and revolutionary socialist political parties from around the world, held in Petrograd and Moscow from July 19 to August 7, 1920. The 2nd Congress is best remembered for formulating and implementing the 21 Conditions for membership in the Communist International.

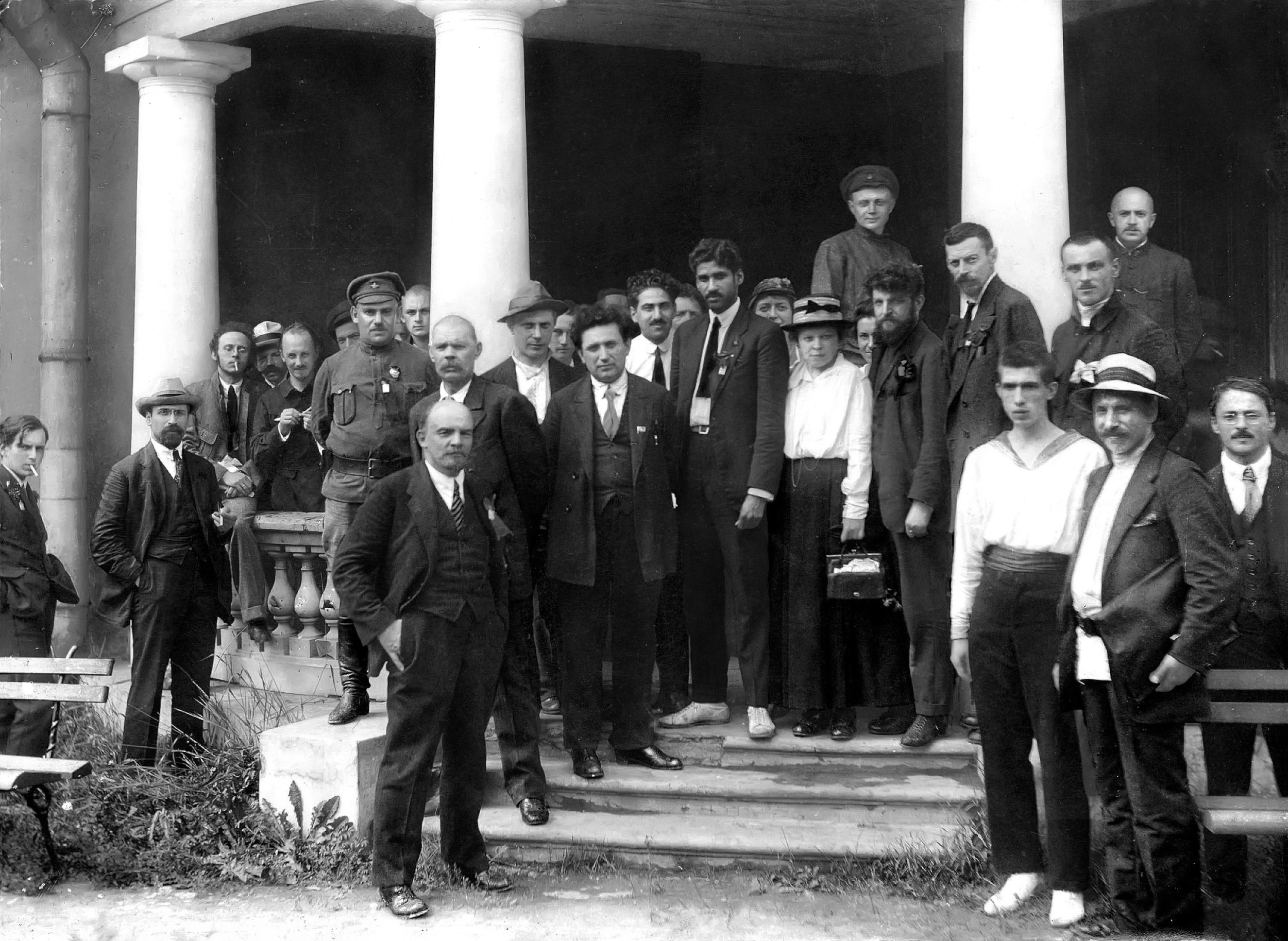
Delegates II Congress of the Comintern: Lev Karakhan (second from left), Karl Radek (third, smoking), Nikolai Bukharin (fifth), Mikhail Lashevich (seventh, form), Maxim Gorky (ninth, shaved), Vladimir Lenin (tenth, hands in pockets), Sergey Zorin (eleventh with the hat), Grigory Zinoviev (thirteenth, hands behind his back), Maria Ilyinichna Ulyanova (nineteen white blouse), Nicola Bombacci (with beard), Lazar Shatskin (white shirt & white shoes) and Abram Belenky (with a hat).

== Overview ==
The 2nd World Congress of the Communist International, held in the summer of 1920, has been regarded by scholars as "the first authentic international meeting of the new organization's members and supporters," owing to the ad hoc nature of the 1919 Founding Convention. The gathering is also significant for the level of participation of Soviet leader Vladimir Lenin, who participated in the affairs of the gathering more intensely than at any other, preparing a host of key documents and actively helping to chart the gathering's course.

The 2nd World Congress took place at a time of heated world political passion, as British historian E.H. Carr later recalled:

"The second congress marked the crowning moment in the history of the Comintern as an international force, the moment when the Russian revolution seemed most certainly on the point of transforming itself into a European revolution, with the destinies of the RSFSR merged in those of some broader European unit."

Whereas in 1919 no mass Socialist party had participated in the activities of the Founding Convention, the 1920 gathering saw the inclusion of credentialed delegates from several large European groups, including the Independent Social Democratic Party of Germany (USPD), the French Section of the Workers' International (SFIO), and the Social Democratic Party of Czechoslovakia. The Bolsheviks denied permission to attend to the recently formed (January 1920) Ukrainian Communist Party (CPU).

It was at the 2nd World Congress that the nature of Communist parties was decided upon, the conditions for their admission to the Communist International set, and the relationship of the national organizations to their international directing center formally established for the first time.

== Delegate composition ==
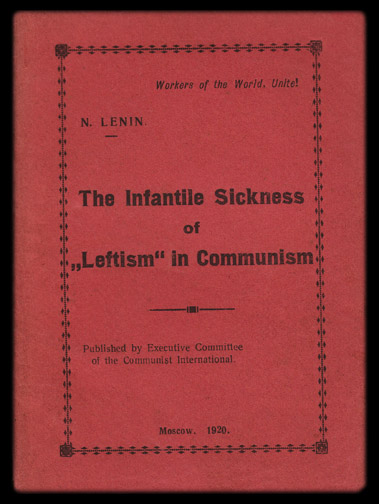
The first English edition of Lenin's "Left Wing" Communism, as distributed to delegates to the 2nd World Congress of the Comintern.

The official records of the 2nd World Congress indicate that a total of 218 delegates participated in the proceedings, including 54 representatives of Socialist, Social Democratic, and other non-Communist political parties and 12 representatives of youth organizations. At least 30 delegates were representatives of the various nationalities of Asia.

Delegates were housed in Moscow at the Delevoi Dvor, a hotel a short walk from the Congress's sessions held at the Kremlin. With food in short supply, fare provided to the delegates was poor, with some delegates forced to rely to some extent upon stores brought into the country with them.

Upon arriving at their hotel rooms, delegates were provided with an assortment of written reports, draft resolutions, and copies of two recently published books — Terrorism and Communism by Leon Trotsky and ""Left-Wing" Communism: An Infantile Disorder by V.I. Lenin.

Delegates participated a wide range of events, touring the country, attending shop meetings, watching theatrical performances, and participating in a subbotnik loading railroad ties.

== Background ==
On April 22, 1920, the Executive Committee of the Communist International (ECCI) voted to hold a 2nd World Congress of its member parties at some indefinite date in the near future. This was followed on June 14, 1920, by the formal publication by ECCI of a call for a 2nd World Congress to be held in Moscow one month hence. Political parties pledging allegiance to the organization were urged to send delegations at once.

During this period Soviet Russia was subject to an armed blockade by land and sea, making travel extremely difficult. Legal passage was possible only through the Estonian port of Revel (known today as Tallinn), but even this means was difficult due to the systematic denial of travel passports to radicals intending on traveling to Central Europe.

War between Soviet Russia and Poland raged in the summer of 1920 and wrecked locomotives and derailed freight cars lined the tracks, further complicating the transportation situation.

Some delegates were forced by circumstances to use false passports and identity documents or to travel without any legal documentation whatsoever, such as by stowing away on a ship. Three French delegates lost their lives in transit, when a small fishing boat setting sail from Murmansk in an attempt to run the Allied blockade went down in stormy weather.

== Proceedings ==
=== Opening of the Congress ===
The Congress was scheduled to open on July 15, but owing to rampant transit difficulties, many delegates had not arrived in Soviet Russia by that date. ECCI decided to postpone the first working sessions by one week.

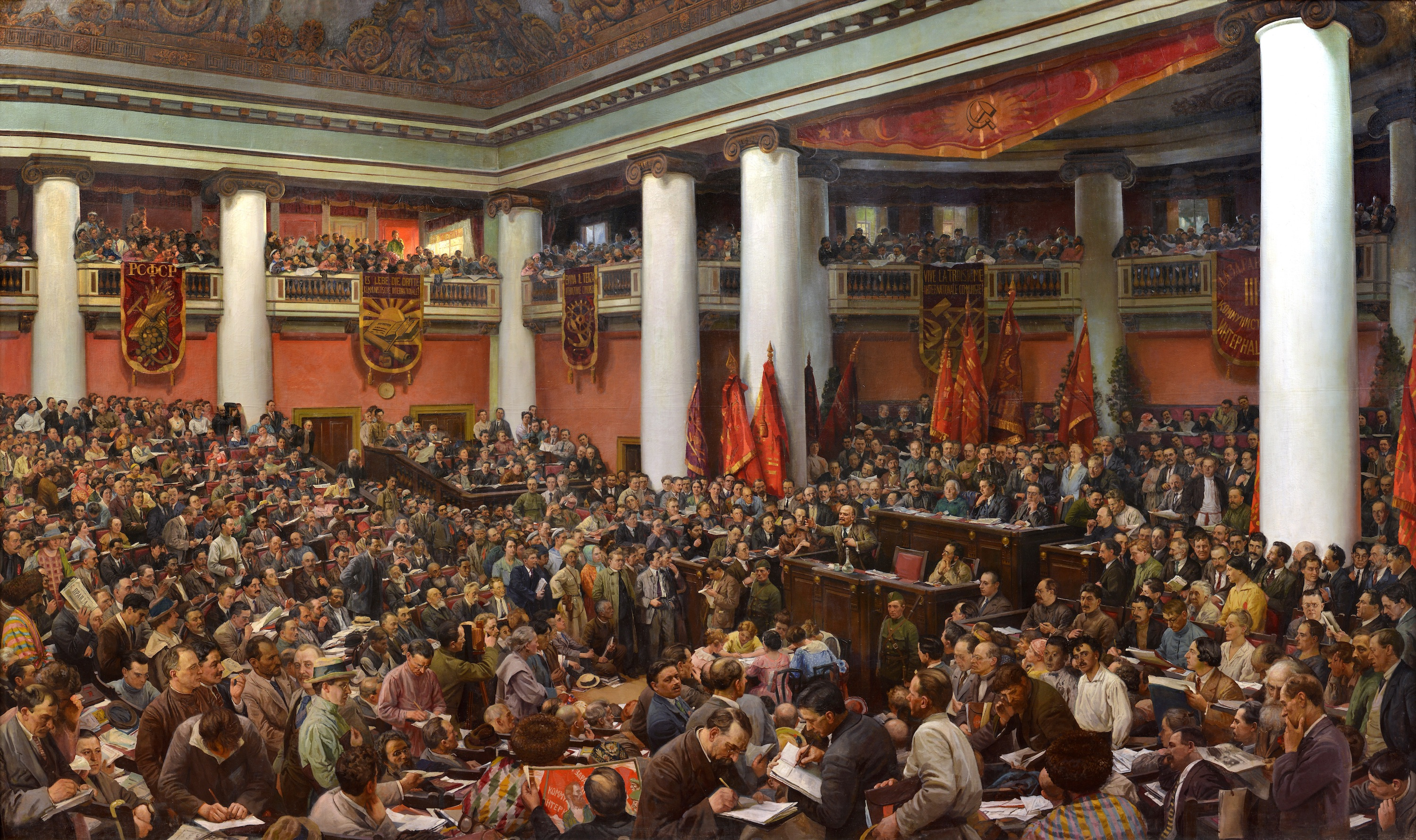
Lenin delivers an address at the Uritsky Theater; 1924 painting by Isaak Brodsky

Following a meal in the Great Hall of Smolny, the delegates, accompanied by thousands of Petrograd workers, marched to the Uritsky Theater where they heard a keynote address on the international situation and the tasks of the Comintern delivered by Lenin. Afterwards the delegates participated in a mass demonstration before gathering at the former stock exchange to see a costume drama called "Spectacle of the Two Worlds" performed by a cast of 3,000.

Following the opening festivities in Petrograd, a three-day break followed, after which the Congress reconvened in Moscow in the former Vladimir Throne Room of the Kremlin. Four official languages were used at the convention — English, French, German, and Russian — with secretaries typing convention documents in each. The primary languages spoken on the floor were French and German, with simultaneous translations taking place in various corners of the room.

The Congress elected a Bureau (governing committee) to make decisions about procedure. All delegates had the right to submit resolution proposals to the Congress and the privilege was not an empty one, as a number of such proposals were submitted.

Voting delegates were provided with red cards, non-voting "consultative" delegates blue cards, and guests green cards, with votes taken by means of counting cards. Voting strength of each delegation was based upon the relative importance of each national party to the international communist movement rather than the actual size of the membership of these groups. At no point in the Congress was a roll call vote taken; rather, a simple counting of cards raised on the floor determined all outcomes.

=== Notable Topics and Decisions Discussed ===
==== The 21 Conditions ====
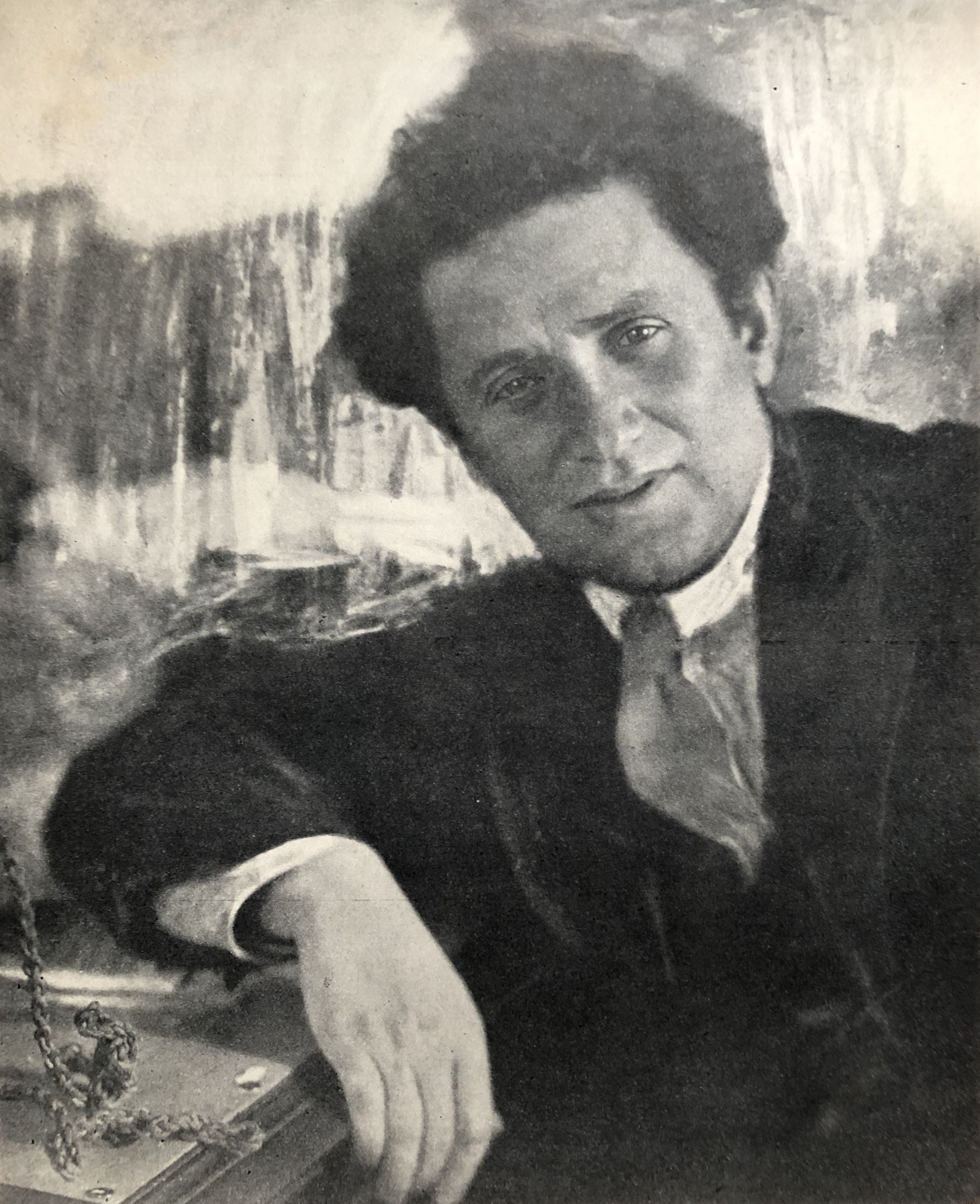
Comintern Chairman Grigorii Zinoviev.

The 2nd World Congress began its actual work on July 23, 1920. Two sessions were dedicated to discussion of the structure and role of Communist parties, with a summary report and theses delivered to the body by Comintern Chairman Grigorii Zinoviev. After Zinoviev's theses on the matter were unanimously adopted by the assembled delegates, debate moved to conditions for admission to the Communist International, a discussion which ultimately produced a document known as the 21 Conditions.

Ever since the founding of the Comintern in 1919, a number of political parties in the Social Democratic tradition — including the Socialist Party of America (SPA) and the Independent Social Democratic Party of Germany (USPD) — had sought admission into the ranks of the international organization. To the Comintern leadership, the electoral orientation and pacifism of such organizations marked them as fundamentally different from the Communist movement and its orientation towards armed struggle and saw the Comintern as a mechanism for the centralized coordination of such efforts around the world.

Such so-called "Centrist" parties, with the German USPD in the first rank, sought a more inclusive and advisory role for the Comintern, in line with the model utilized by the ill-fated Second International. The four delegates of the USPD remained united before the session of the 2nd Congress's Commission on Conditions for Admission.

On July 25, the Commission on Conditions for Admission voted 5–3 on a proposal by Lenin that only parties with a clear majority on their governing Central Committee favoring affiliation to the Comintern prior to the 2nd World Congress would be permitted membership in that organization. Subsequent debate by the Congress itself on July 29 and 30 urged against any concessions to so-called "Centrist" leaders. Following extended commission discussions, a set of 21 Conditions for admission to the Comintern was proposed.

==== The trade union question ====
The 2nd World Congress dealt extensively with the relationship between the trade union movement and the emerging international communist movement. Left-wing communists were scornful of the "conservative" nature of the established union movement in many counties, exemplified by the American Federation of Labor in the United States and the reformist International Federation of Trade Unions, based in Amsterdam. The limited horizons of such organizations, limited to matters of daily concern as wages, hours, and working conditions, were seen as a manifestation of class collaboration and an impediment to the revolutionary transformation of society.

The left-wing communists argued that these unions were a by-product of capitalism and that they, like the political parties of the Second International, had betrayed the working class by supporting their national governments in World War I — seen as a war of imperial conquest. Such unions were worthy only of expeditious destruction, the left-wing communists believed.

Lenin and other Comintern leaders disagreed sharply with the demand of the left-wing communists that new explicitly revolutionary dual unions should be established and supported, arguing the 25 million workers participating in unions affiliated with the Amsterdam International had already made their basic organizational decision. Instead, Lenin and his co-thinkers argued, radical workers should remain within these established unions and to attempt to work from within to move them onto a revolutionary course.

At the same time the Comintern leadership had already been working to establish a new revolutionary international union organization to compete with the Amsterdam International — a goal which the left-wing communists saw as contradictory with the policy of remaining within the established "conservative" unions. Meetings between Comintern officials and trade union leaders in Moscow in the summer of 1920 had led to the establishment of the International Council of Trade and Industrial Unions (Mezhsovprof), forerunner of the Red International of Labor Unions (Profintern) that was established the next year.

The union question remained a matter of heated contention at the 2nd World Congress, with the representatives of the British Shop Stewards Movement and syndicalist delegates from Germany and the United States refusing to abandon their hostility to the strategy of "boring from within" the established unions. Ultimately, the majority of the 2nd World Congress moved to support Lenin's policy, detailed at length in his recently published book "Left-Wing" Communism: An Infantile Disorder.

==== The colonial question ====
The 2nd World Congress also for the first time paid serious attention to the national liberation movements of the colonies of Asia, Africa, and the Americas. While Lenin drafted theses on colonial issues, supplementary theses were presented to the Congress by Indian radical M. N. Roy, formally a delegate from the fledgling Communist Party of Mexico, Avetis Sultan-Zade of Persia, and Pak Chin-sun of Korea, during the 4th Session of the Congress. Dutch communist Maring served as secretary on the commission to review both theses.

The final resolution of the Congress directed communists in colonial countries to support the "national-revolutionary" movement in each, without regard to the fact that non-communist and non-working class elements such as the bourgeoisie and the peasantry might be dominant. Particular attention was paid to formulating an alliance with the rural poor as a means of winning and holding power in a revolution. Russia's Bolsheviks did not apply any of this to non-Russian territories under Bolshevik control at the time—although non-Russian communist parties in those territories did.

== Cultural and sports activities ==
There were several cultural and sports activities arranged to accompany the second congress:

- a soccer match between Moscow and an International XI. Willie Gallagher captained the International XI, which included John Reed. However, they lost heavily to Moscow in front of a crowd of 18,000 in the Red Stadium, located in the former Moscow River Yacht Club.

== Legacy ==
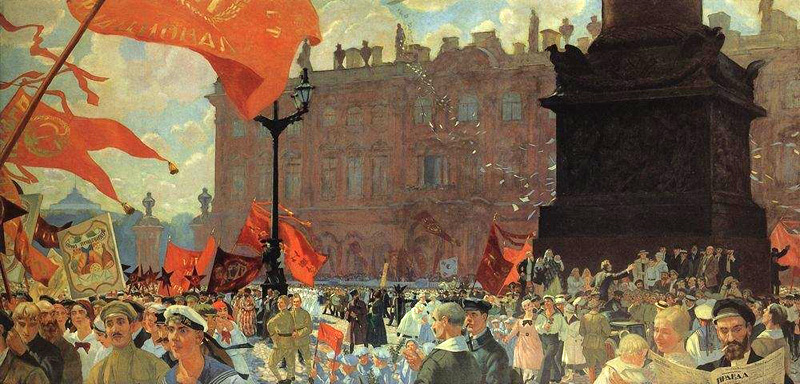
Boris Kustodiyev. Festival of the II Congress of Comintern on the Uritsky Square (former Palace square) in Petrograd

Historian E. H. Carr has argued that the 2nd World Congress — to some extent unintentionally and unconsciously — was the first to "establish Russian leadership of Comintern on an impregnable basis." In addition to the esteem accorded the Russians as practitioners of the first successful Marxist revolution, Carr noted that the Russian delegation "invariably spoke with a united voice," in sharp contrast to the contentious and divided delegations from Germany, France, Great Britain, Italy, and the United States. Therefore, "the Communist International which would make the world revolution was created in the image of the party which had made the Russian revolution," Carr observed.

== See also ==
- List of delegates of the 2nd Comintern congress
- Congress of the Peoples of the East
