= 1st Congress of the Comintern =

1919 international gathering in Moscow

1st World Congress of the Communist International Первый конгресс Коммунистического интернационала
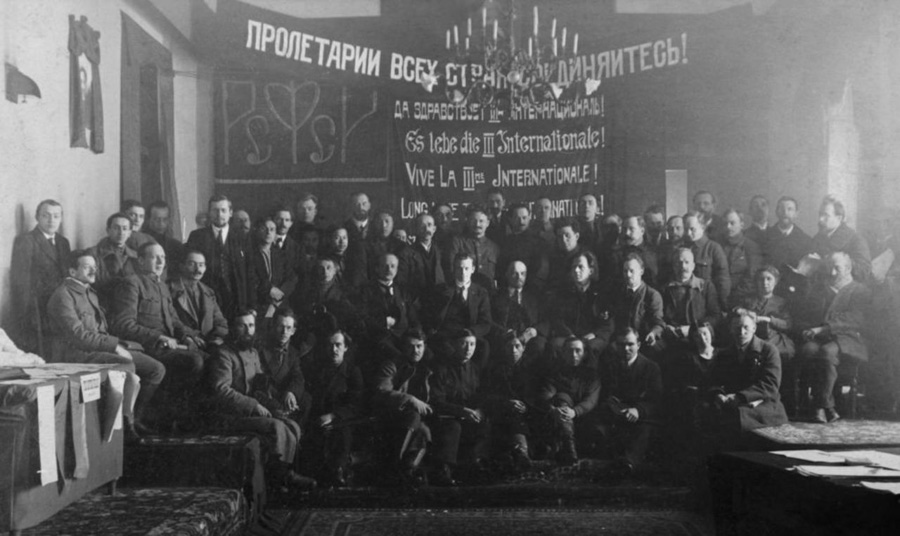
- Delegates at the congress
- Begins: March 2, 1919
- Ends: March 6, 1919
- Venue: Kremlin
- Location: Moscow
- Country: Russian Soviet Federative Socialist Republic
- Previous event: Stockholm Conference
- Next event: 2nd Congress
- Participants: 51 delegates from 35 parties
- Attendance: Delegates

The 1st Congress of the Communist International was an international gathering of communist, revolutionary socialist, and syndicalist delegates held in Moscow which established the Communist International (Comintern). The gathering, held from March 2 to 6, 1919, was attended by 51 representatives of more than two dozen countries from around Europe, North America, and Asia.

== Convention call ==
Late in December 1918, the leadership of the Russian Communist Party decided that the time was ripe for the convocation of a new international association of radical political parties to supplant the discredited Second International. On December 24 a radio broadcast was made from Moscow calling upon the "communists of all countries" to "rally around the revolutionary Third International."

Lenin sought to invite only those organizations which stood for a break with the more conservative elements in their group and who stood for immediate socialist revolution and the establishment of a dictatorship of the proletariat and a Soviet-style form of government. Lenin hoped for a gathering to be held beginning February 1, 1919, either openly in Berlin or, if necessary, secretly in the Netherlands. Owing to political difficulties between Soviet Russia and the rather conservative social democratic government of Germany and the eruption of civil war there, Berlin was quickly rejected as inhospitable for a foundation congress.

On January 21, 1919, a meeting of about a dozen communists living in Moscow determined to hold a formal gathering in that city, to begin February 15 – little more than 3 weeks hence. The formal convention call was composed by People's Commissar of War Leon Trotsky and listed invited political organizations by name.

Invited organizations from the English-speaking world included "the left forces in the British Socialist Party (in particular, representatives of the Maclean current)" (a reference to John Maclean), the British Socialist Labour Party, the Industrial Workers of the World in Britain, the Industrial Workers group in Britain, "revolutionary forces in the shop stewards' movement in Britain, "revolutionary forces in Irish workers organizations," and the Industrial Workers of the World in Australia.

In addition to these, from the United States were invited the American Socialist Labor Party, "left forces of the American Socialist Party (especially the current represented by the Socialist Propaganda League)," the Industrial Workers of the World in America, and the SLP-affiliated Workers International Industrial Union.

Owing to communications difficulties ensuing from the Allied blockade, few organizations outside of Soviet Russia heard of the convention call in sufficient time to send delegates. About two dozen special messengers were said to have been sent out with the news, but only three or four managed to reach their destinations in time with the news. The call was published in the press, however, in Soviet Russia on January 24, 1919, and in Austria and Hungary by the end of the month.

Transport difficulties forced a further postponement of the gathering, with the start date moved back two weeks to March 2, 1919. Despite this additional delay only two parties managed to credential delegates and to successfully get them to Moscow on time for the opening of the meeting. Two prospective delegates – Fritz Platten of Switzerland and Karl Steinhardt of Austria – were arrested and briefly jailed in transit.

As a result, the vast majority of those who sat as delegates to this founding congress of the Communist International had no formal status with the parties which they claimed to represent and the delegates initially decided that the session would be a preparatory conference rather than a formal foundation convention. This initial decision was later overturned by the assembled delegates and the Third, Communist International was declared established.

== Delegate composition ==
Over the six days of the congress a total of 51 delegates were registered, representing 35 organizations in 22 countries. All political tendencies in the Zimmerwald Left movement were represented at the gathering with the exception of the left wing of the International Union of Socialist Youth. Most of these delegates had already been residing in Soviet Russia, however, with only 9 of those attending the founding congress managing to break through the allied blockade of the country from abroad.

With regard to the English-speaking world, no representative of the various parties and tendencies of Great Britain which were invited were in attendance at the founding congress. The only British representative present was Joseph Fineberg, a member of the British Socialist Party who had come to Soviet Russia on his own in 1918. Fineberg received only non-voting credentials as a representative of British Communists living in Russia.

From the United States there was only Boris Reinstein, a Buffalo, New York member of the Socialist Labor Party of America (SLP) who had been previously sent to Europe as the party's representative to an altogether different international conclave. Although Reinstein was granted status as a voting delegate at the congress, at no time did the SLP authorize him to act as its representative at the congress and his independent action was subsequently repudiated by the organization. Dutch engineer S. J. Rutgers, at that time a resident of the United States, sat as a non-voting delegate of the Socialist Propaganda League of America as well as holding similar status on behalf of the Dutch Social Democratic Group.

There were no delegates in attendance in either a voting or consultative status from the English-speaking countries of Canada, Australia, New Zealand, or South Africa.

The nationalities outside of Europe were well represented at the founding congress, including a group of five voting delegates from the "United Group of the Eastern Peoples of Russia," a voting delegate from Armenia, as well as non-voting delegates from Turkey, Turkestan, Georgia, Azerbaijan, Persia, China, and Korea. In all these 13 delegates represented fully one-quarter of the 52 voting and non-voting delegates to the gathering.

The largest and most influential delegation, not surprisingly, was that of Soviet Russia. In addition to the five delegates assigned as representatives of the various "Eastern peoples" of the former Russian Empire, six regular and two consultative delegates were in attendance, including such key figures of the Russian Communist Party as Lenin, Joseph Stalin, Trotsky, Grigori Zinoviev, Nikolai Bukharin, Georgii Chicherin, V. V. Vorovsky, and Valerian Osinsky.

The delegates were, in general, younger than had been typical at previous international socialist gatherings. Of the 43 delegates for whom an age is known, 5 were in their 20s and 24 were in their 30s, with only the American Boris Reinstein over the age of 50.

== Congress location ==
The Founding Convention was held at the Kremlin in Moscow in a small hall in the Courts of Justice. The long, narrow hall was barely large enough for 100 people, with the delegates seated upon flimsy chairs at small tables spaced throughout the room.

== See also ==
- 2nd World Congress of the Comintern
- 3rd World Congress of the Comintern
