= Leo Flieg =

German politician (1893–1939)

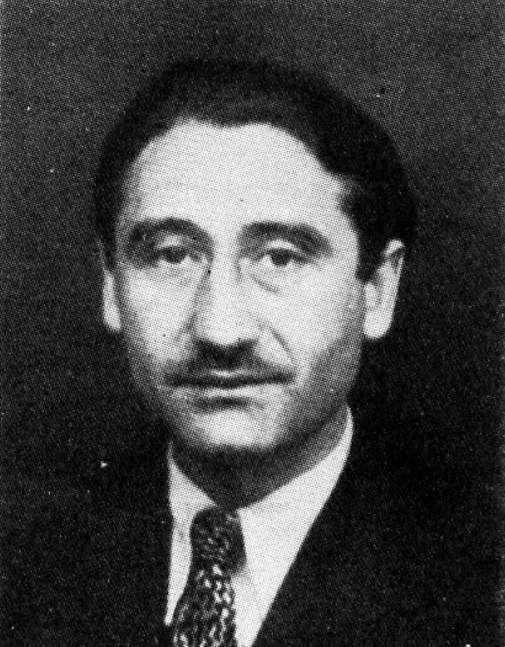
- Flieg c. 1932

Member of the Landtag of Prussia for Westphalia South
- In office 5 January 1925 – 31 March 1933
- Preceded by: Multi-member district
- Succeeded by: Constituency abolished

Personal details
- Born: 5 November 1893 Berlin, Province of Brandenburg, Kingdom of Prussia, German Empire
- Died: 15 March 1939 (aged 45) Moscow, Soviet Union
- Cause of death: Execution by shooting
- Party: SPD (1908–1919); KPD (1919–1939)
- Other political affiliations: Spartacus League (1914–1918)
- Occupation: Politician; Party Functionary; Bank Clerk

Military service
- Allegiance: German Empire
- Branch/service: Imperial German Army; General Staff; Foreign Armies Department
- Years of service: 1914–1918
- Battles/wars: World War I (WIA)
- Central institution membership: 1922–1932: Secretary, KPD Orgburo; 1929–1932: Full member, KPD Politburo; 1928–1929; 1932–1937: Candidate member, KPD Politburo; 1927–1939: Full member, KPD Central Committee

Leopold "Leo" Flieg (5 November 1893 – 15 March 1939) was a German communist politician. A founding member of the Communist Party of Germany, he was regarded by some as an "éminence grise" to the national leadership. He served as organizational secretary of the party from 1922 to 1932 and as a member of the Landtag of Prussia from 1924 until the Nazis came to power in 1933. He fled to Moscow soon after, where he was arrested in 1938 and executed in 1939, during the Great Purge.

== Early life ==
Leopold Flieg was born into a Jewish working-class family in Berlin on 5 November 1893. His mother and sister, along with a number of relatives, would be murdered in the Holocaust.

On leaving school Flieg undertook a commercial apprenticeship at a bank, and he worked as a bank official till the outbreak of the war. In 1908, aged fifteen, he joined the Young Socialists. Three years later, still aged only eighteen, he joined the Social Democratic Party ("Sozialdemokratische Partei Deutschlands" / SPD) itself. 1911 was also the year in which he became a member of the "Zentralverband der Handlungsgehilfen" (loosely: "National Clerical Workers' Union"). There are indications that he was already on the fringes of the social circle centred on the political pioneers, Rosa Luxemburg and Karl Liebknecht. During the First World War Flieg was conscripted into the army, but he was wounded early on and spent the war years in Berlin where he was employed as a "soldier-clerk" in the "secret department" of the General Staff.

During the war years Flieg was involved actively with the anti-war Spartacus League, and he was one of the founders of one of the Free Socialist Youth ("Freie sozialistische Jugend") organisations of the time. In 1918, working as secretary for Leo Jogiches, a close friend of Rosa Luxemburg he increasingly became an "insider" with the leadership of what would soon become the Communist Party. Flieg was always noted for his discretion and reticent demeanour, however. His manner was famously measured and he never raised his voice. During 1918 he began a lifelong friendship with Willi Münzenberg, but the extent of his influence in extremist left-wing circles during the crucial final months of 1918 remains unclear.

== Communist Party of Germany ==
The founding congress of the Communist Party of Germany (KPD) took place in Berlin over three days between 30 December 1918 and 1 January 1919. The core of the founding membership consisted of those who had hitherto been Spartacus League members; Flieg was a party member and part of the leadership team from the outset. He worked closely with Willi Münzenberg on the creation of the Young Communist International ("Kommunistische Jugendinternationale" / KJI), serving as a member of its executive committee from its launch in 1919 till March 1922. During the immediate postwar years Flieg was lodging in Berlin with the family of a girl friend. The father of the family, who worked at the giant Osram factory in Berlin, was heard to marvel at the abstemious ways of his daughter's seemingly unassuming friend: "I was amazed that Leo managed a whole egg for breakfast: half that amount would most certainly have been enough for him!" ("Mich wundert es eigentlich, das Leo zum Frühstück ein ganzes Ei schafft, ein halbes würde ihm sicher auch genügen!").

From 1922, jointly with Käthe Pohl, Flieg served as secretary to the Organisation Office ("Orgbüro") of the party politburo. He participated in every congress conducted by the KPD between 1920 and 1932. In 1924 he was elected to the Landtag of Prussia representing Westphalia South. He was re-elected several times before Communists were excluded from the Landtag in 1933. He was elected to the KPD Central Committee in 1927 and appears to have joined the Politburo shortly afterwards. At the 6th World Congress of the Communist International in 1928, he joined the Comintern International Control Commission.

One source indicates that from 1928 Flieg made his home in the Comintern's so-called "Hotel Lux" in Moscow, though the extent of his activities in Germany suggests that at this point much of his time was still spent in Berlin. Flieg liked to operate behind the scenes, which can make it hard to pin down details of his work for the KPD. According to one source, records uncovered in Moscow during 1992/93 show that during the early 1930s, as a secretary of the party and commissioner of the Comintern Intelligence Service ("Отдел международной связи, " / OMS), Flieg was in charge of spending an annual subsidy from Moscow valued at 1.8 million marks, co-ordinating false passports, radio operators and couriers. He himself headed up a counterfeiting operation with 170 "employees". This intelligence role was conducted in close collaboration with the Soviet secret police.

In May 1932 Flieg was suddenly dismissed from his various functions by the KPD. At the time a party newspaper - identified, perhaps inevitably, as a Trotskyist newspaper - noted that party comrades had probably barely heard of him. But Flieg had nevertheless become the stabilizing figure ("der ruhende Pol") in the party Central Committee:
"... quiet and inconspicuous, no puffed up bozo, but a completely reliable and punctilious party official, Leo Flieg survived under a succession of leadership regimes. He had taken down Brandler's secret minutes without batting an eyelid. He had distributed the circulars produced by Ruth Fischer and Werner Scholem, and those in the know suggest that deep down Fischer was the only one whose vision he really shared. But he survived. He survived Ewert (who never entirely trusted him), and since 1928 he had survived for four years as "head of personnel" under Thälmann's leadership, effectively mastering the considerable feat of managing Thälmann's office. Those diplomatic talents must be saluted."
"... still und unscheinbar, kein hochfahrender Bonze, aber ein absolut zuverlässiger und pünktlicher Beamter, hat Leo Flieg manche Zentrale überlebt. Er hat Brandlers Geheimprotokolle geführt, ohne mit der Wimper zu zucken. Er hat die Rundschreiben von Ruth Fischer und Werner Scholem expediert, und Kenner behaupten, die Ruth-Fischer-Zentrale sei auch die einzige gewesen, mit der Flieg im Grunde einverstanden gewesen sei. Trotzdem hat er auch Ewert überlebt, der ihm wenig getraut hat, und er hat seit 1928 als Personalchef der Thälmann-Zentrale immerhin vier Jahre das Kunststück fertiggebracht, das Büro eines Thälmann zu leiten. Alle Achtung vor solchen diplomatischen Talenten...".

The Communist Party of the Soviet Union (CPSU) became increasingly polarised during the later 1920s between those who were supportive of Stalin and those who dared to speculate that perhaps Lenin's successor should have been Leon Trotsky. The CPSU and the KPD were closely linked at various levels; party ruptures in Moscow often found powerful echoes among the comrades in Berlin. A major programme of expulsions was carried out in 1928 following the Wittorf Affair, during which Flieg was one of party leader Ernst Thälmann's only allies. Many of those expelled later established an alternative party. Sources insist that through this period Flieg carried out his party functions with skill, loyalty and meticulous care, without regard to whether the party leadership might be considered too far to the left or too far to the right. Then, in May 1932 Flieg was relieved by the KPD of his party responsibilities, seen as having become too close to Heinz Neumann, a close political comrade and a personal friend. In 1930/31 Neumann had become critical of Thälmann, and thereby also of Stalin, both of whom, he said, were underestimating the dangers presented by the rise of the Nazi Party. In April 1932 Neumann was stripped of his party functions and summoned to Moscow. Flieg was identified as a "member of the Neumann group" and his demotions, accompanied by the inevitable mutterings about Trotskyite sympathies, followed a few weeks later. His membership of the politburo was reduced to "candidate membership".

== In exile ==
Despite his disgrace in Germany, Flieg still had influential friend in Moscow as a result of his years as linkman for the Berlin activities of the OMS. He knew Piatnitsky and Abramov-Mirov and other Comintern leaders from long years of working together on "intelligence matters". By the end of 1932 he was working in Moscow for the Comintern executive committee. Sources are not entirely consistent over his postings over the next few years. In January 1933 the Nazis came to power in Germany and Communist activists were either arrested (or worse) or escaped abroad. Moscow and Paris both quickly became informal headquarter locations for the KPD in exile. Flieg was sent to Paris and was able to renew his important hands-on political work as a "technical secretary to the politburo". By 1934 he was evidently rehabilitated by the Germany party, and there is mention of his having been sent by the politburo Central Committee not just to Paris, but also to Saarbrücken during the run-up to the 1935 referendum, and to Prague. In October 1935 the exiled KPD held its first party conference since the Nazi take-over in Berlin. The Brussels Conference was also the last conference that the party would be able to hold for more than ten years. Flieg participated, identified pseudonymously as "Alfons", and presented the party's finance report. He was re-elected to the party Central Committee. After that he was probably based in Paris till 1937.

In 1937 Flieg was deprived of his German nationality and so became stateless. At Easter that year he received an invitation from the Comintern to a meeting in Moscow. Those with contacts in the Soviet Union were by this time fully aware of the rising level of political arrests under way in what later came to be known in English language sources as the Great Purge. Flieg knew the risks inherent in returning to Moscow and friends urged him to stay in Paris. The Swedish banker Olof Aschberg urged him not to go, and promised support in seeking "emigrant status" from the French authorities. But Flieg felt constrained to accept the invitation. He had responsibilities for party monies, and feared he might be accused of embezzlement by Comintern chiefs in Moscow if he did not comply with their order.

== Death ==
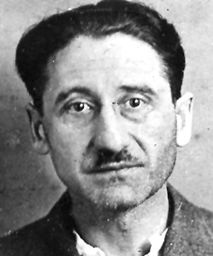
Flieg's NKVD mugshot, 1938

Flieg returned to Moscow in June 1937 and installed himself once more in the "Hotel Lux". His meeting with Comintern management took place, but he received only a reprimand. Early in 1938 the German representative among the Comintern leadership, Philipp Dengel, lodged an application for Flieg to be permitted to leave the country again. Authorisation never came through. Instead, on 20 March 1938, Flieg was arrested by the NKVD and charge with "membership of a right-wing Trotskyite spying organisation".

According to a television report of research undertaken by the Hamburg historian, Reinhard Müller, Flieg was tortured for an entire year ("Flieg wurde ein ganzes Jahr lang gefoltert ...."). In the course that lengthy succession of torture sessions he was persuaded to incriminate himself and many others. In the written "confession" extracted from him he confirmed his membership of a Comintern anti-Soviet conspiracy. On 14 March 1939 Flieg was condemned to death by a military tribunal of the High Court and executed by shooting. He was posthumously rehabilitated in 1957.

== Legacy ==
Personal paranoia at the top of the Soviet government which underpinned the Great Purge can be seen as a sufficient explanation for Flieg's conviction. He was only one of many hundred Comintern workers and collaborators who fell victim to it. Documents from the Soviet Union that became available after 1990 disclosed a hitherto unsuspected level of involvement by leading members of the German community of exiled communists in Moscow. In the words of one headline that appeared in 1990, "more than a thousand German communists fell victim to the Stalin Terror, with the approval of leading comrades in the Communist Party of Germany". Subsequent investigation of contemporary documents suggests to some that the involvement of the leading German communist comrades probably extended beyond mere approval.

In 2002 work undertaken on more recently studied Soviet documents led one specialist historian to point the finger at Herbert Wehner (identified in Soviet records of the time under the party name "Kurt Funk"). Wehner returned from Soviet exile in 1946 and rose to become a leading figure in West Germany's Social Democratic Party. Under NKVD interrogation in the Lubyanka Building during 1937 Wehner found himself accused of joint responsibility for the arrest, in Germany, of the German party leader, Ernst Thälmann, back in 1933. The accusation might have been expected to have ended in Wehner's death, but it did not. Wehner chose to co-operate. He wrote for his interrogators a lengthy report entitled "Report of investigation into deeply ingrained Trotzkyite activity in the German anti-fascist movement" ("Untersuchungsbericht zur trotzkistischen Wühlarbeit in der deutschen antifaschistischen Bewegung"). The report included the names of all the communist German political exiles in Moscow who shortly afterwards fell under suspicion of being "Trotskyites" and / or members of "counter-revolutionary groups". Wehner's report on Flieg included the observation that he had been characterised by party leader Ernst Thälmann as a rogue (" Er sei, so Wehner, vom Vorsitzenden Ernst Thälmann als Gauner bezeichnet worden"). Soon after Wehner submitted his report hundreds of KPD refugees were detained by the Soviet authorities. For Reinhard Müller this was part of a desperate "survival strategy", which for a terrified Herbert Wehner worked in its own terms, but for which hundreds of others paid the price. An alternative interpretation might be that the German political exiles caught up in the Great Purge would have been arrested anyway, and Wehner's active collusion merely facilitated the exercise.
