= Hugo Eberlein =

German politician (1887–1941)

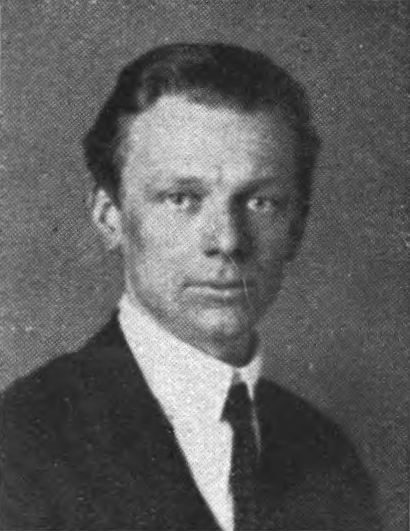
- Eberlein c. 1921

Member of the Landtag of Prussia for Berlin
- In office 10 March 1921 – 31 March 1933
- Preceded by: Constituency established
- Succeeded by: Constituency abolished

Personal details
- Born: 4 May 1887 Saalfeld, Kingdom of Saxony, German Empire
- Died: 16 October 1941 (aged 54) Moscow, Soviet Union
- Cause of death: Firing squad
- Resting place: Zentralfriedhof Friedrichsfelde
- Party: SPD (1906–1917); USPD (1917–1919); KPD (1919–1941)
- Other political affiliations: Spartacus League (1914–1918)
- Spouse(s): Luise Harms (m. 1913) Inna Armand
- Relations: Inessa Armand (mother-in-law)
- Children: Werner; Ines
- Occupation: Politician
- Central institution membership: 1924–1925; 1927–1929: Full member, KPD Politburo; 1919–1929: Full member, KPD Central Committee (Note: Zentrale until 1925); Other offices held: 1918–1919: Chairman, Danzig Workers' and Soldiers' Council

Max Albert Hugo Eberlein (4 May 1887 – 16 October 1941) was a German communist politician. He took part of the founding congress of the Communist Party of Germany ("KPD") in December 1918 and January 1919, and then in the First Congress of the Comintern (2–6 March 1919), where he held important posts until 1928, the result of his involvement with the Conciliator faction. When the Nazis took power in Germany in 1933, Eberlein fled to the Soviet Union, where he found refuge at the Hotel Lux.

In July 1937 he fell under the Great Purge. In January 1938 he was interrogated and tortured for ten days and nights. In April 1938 he was taken to Lefortovo Prison, where he was tortured for weeks at a time; then in 1939 he was sentenced to 15 years in the Vorkuta Gulag. He was returned to Moscow in 1941, when he was tried and sentenced again, and was shot on 16 October 1941. Hugo Eberlein was later rehabilitated and became a national hero in East Germany; his name was even borne by a guard regiment of the National People's Army.

== Years in Germany ==
Eberlein was born in Saalfeld on 4 May 1887, the son of a factory worker. A trained technical draftsman, he joined the SPD in 1906, where he belonged to the left wing. As an opponent of Burgfriedenspolitik, the party's policy of support for and cessation of strikes during the First World War, he co-founded the USPD and the Spartacus League. Following the German Revolution in 1918, he served as chairman of the Danzig Workers' and Soldiers' Council. At the end of the year he was a founding member of the KPD and was elected to its leadership, to which he belonged until 1929.

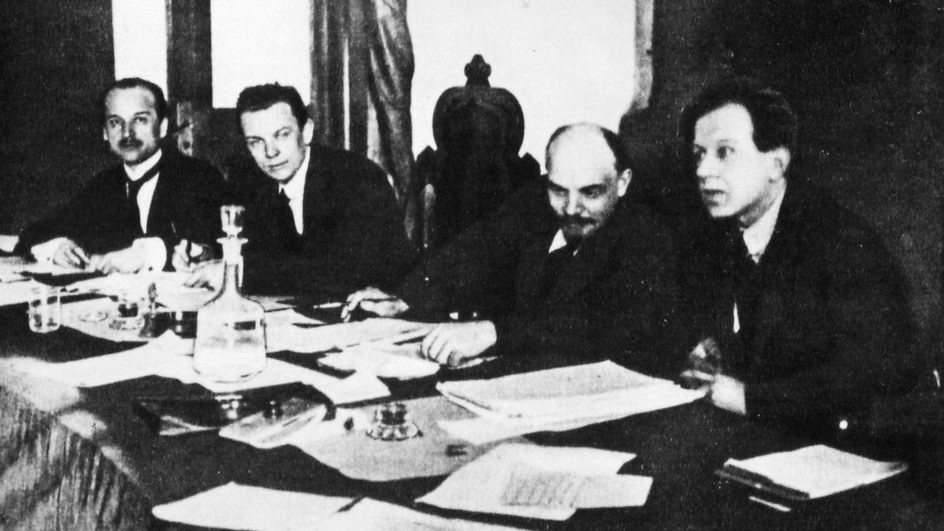
Eberlein (second from left) with Vladimir Lenin (third from left) among the Presidium of the 1st Congress of the Comintern, March 1919

He represented the party executive of the KPD in the place of the murdered Rosa Luxemburg at the founding congress of the Communist International (Comintern) in early March 1919, where he abstained from voting on its founding–as previously recommended by Luxemburg and Leo Jogiches–because he believed that it was premature. Nevertheless, once the Comintern had been established, he pleaded successfully for the KPD to join after his return to Germany and acted as a confidante for the Comintern leadership in Germany for the next few years. He was among other things responsible for receiving financial support payments addressed to the KPD.

In May 1919 Eberlein was managing director of the newspaper Die Rote Fahne, the central organ of the KPD. During the March Action of 1921, he was head of the party's military apparatus, and traveled to Halle (near the Leuna works, a site of major strike efforts) to organize sabotage. He was elected to the Landtag of Prussia soon after, serving from 1921 to 1933. Over the course of the 1920s, he initially supported the party leadership around Heinrich Brandler and August Thalheimer, then broke with them to join the so-called Middle Group, and from 1927 was part of the Conciliator faction. The latter supported a united front with the Social Democrats and were driven out of the KPD's leadership in 1929 after the Wittorf affair (which Eberlein helped expose) and the return of Ernst Thälmann to power at the direction of Joseph Stalin. From that point he was employed, like Arthur Ewert and Kurt Sauerland, under the leadership of Béla Kun in the apparatus of the Comintern.

== Exile and death ==
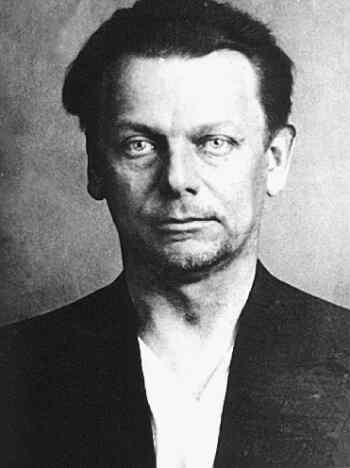
Eberlein's 1937 mugshot

After being briefly imprisoned after the National Socialists seized power in 1933, Eberlein was able to go into exile in the French Third Republic, where he campaigned for the establishment of a popular front between communists, social democrats and bourgeois forces. After being arrested in Strasbourg in 1935 and temporarily imprisoned, he emigrated to the Soviet Union in 1936 after a stopover in Switzerland.

Despite the intercession of his friend Wilhelm Pieck, Eberlein was swept up in the Great Terror and was imprisoned in July 1937. On 5 May 1939, at a closed session of the Military Collegium of the USSR Supreme Court, he was sentenced to 15 years in the gulag for allegedly being involved in a "terrorist organization" within the Comintern apparatus as part of the "anti-Comintern bloc". On 1 June 1939 he was transported to Vorkuta. According to other sources, he was imprisoned in the Unzhlag camp in 1939/1941.

In 1941 he was transferred to a camp 100 km north of Syktyvkar in the Komi Autonomous Soviet Socialist Republic. From here he was transported back to Moscow and charged again. On 30 July 1941 he was sentenced to death by firing squad, which was carried out on 16 October 1941. His brother was also shot.

== Personal life ==
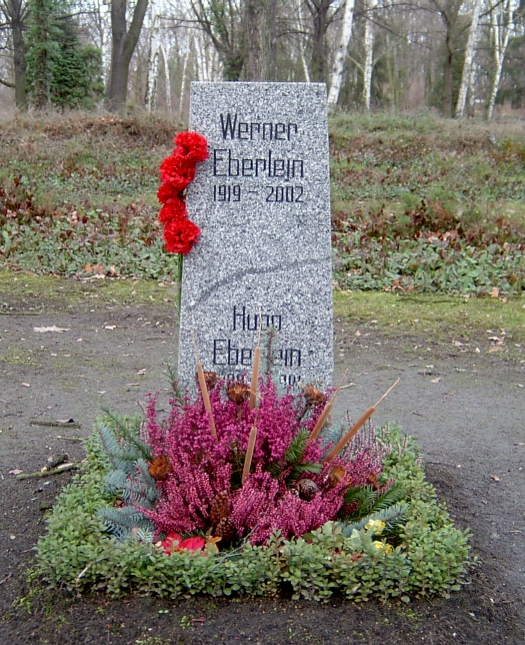
Tombstone of Hugo and Werner Eberlein

Eberlein was married twice; first to Luise Auguste Anna Harms (15 July 1889 – 11 January 1964) in Berlin-Charlottenburg on 3 April 1913, and second to Inna Armand, a daughter of the French-born Russian Bolshevik Inessa Armand. From his first marriage came his son Werner, who made a career as an SED official. From his second marriage came his daughter Ines, born 1923. By 1923, Eberlein had separated from Armand and was living with his secretary, Charlotte Scheckenreuter.

Hugo Eberlein is also commemorated on the tombstone of his son Werner in the graves for victims of fascism and those persecuted by the Nazi regime in Berlin's Friedrichsfelde Central Cemetery.
