= Berthe Zimmermann =

Swiss politician (1902–1937)

- circa 1925
- Born: 27 September 1902; Zürich, Switzerland
- Died: 2 December 1937 (aged 35); Moscow
- Cause of death: execution
- Other names: Berta Zimmermann, Bertha Zimmermann
- Occupations: Communist activist; spy (courier)
- Years active: 1923–1927
- Organization: Communist Party of the Soviet Union
- Known for: head of courier section of Comintern's OMS (International Liaison Department)
- Spouse: Fritz Platten

Berthe Zimmermann (27 September 1902 – 2 December 1937) (also spelled "Berta Zimmermann" and "Bertha Zimmermann") was a Swiss communist and wife of Fritz Platten. She headed the courier section of the Comintern's OMS (International Liaison Department) in Moscow in 1935 and was summarily executed during the Great Purge in 1937.

== Background ==
Zimmermann was born in Zürich, Switzerland, to a Protestant family on September 27, 1902.

== Career ==
In 1923, Zimmermann emigrated from Switzerland to the Soviet Union, where she worked for the Comintern. In 1923–1930, she worked for the Information section. Then in 1930–1931, she worked for the Organization section. Finally, in 1931–1937, she worked for the OMS under Jacob Mirov-Abramov.

After 1935, Zimmermann became head of the OMS's Courier section of OMS. She went on OMS missions to Paris and Prague.

== Personal ==
Zimmermann was married to Fritz Platten, a fellow communist also of Switzerland.

== Death ==
Zimmermann was executed 2 December 1937 in Moscow.

Platten was arrested in 1938, moved to a prison camp near Nyandoma in 1939, and shot on 22 April 1942.
