= Karl Volk =

Karl Volk (1 April 1896 – March 1961) was a Communist politician, journalist and German Resistance fighter against Nazism.

== Biography ==
Volk was born in Schowkwa, Galicia (today Ukraine) to a middle-class Jewish family and grew up in Moravian Prostějov, where he attended gymnasium. He studied economics and philosophy at Charles University in Prague. He was involved with the socialist-zionist Poale Zion and with others in its left wing, joined the Communist Party of Czechoslovakia in 1921. He then went to Soviet Russia and worked short-term in the soviet diplomatic service as a secretary at the embassy in Beijing and at the Soviet Russian press agency in Vienna. At the end of 1922, Volk moved back to Germany, where under the assumed name of Robert, he worked full-time as a functionary of the Communist Party of Germany (KPD). From 1923–1924, he was the political leader of the regional KPD in Lower Saxony and during the Hamburg Uprising, acted as political commissar. After a brief period on the Comintern staff in Moscow, he moved back to Germany in 1924, where he headed the KPD daily newspapers, Sächsische Arbeiterzeitung in Leipzig and Der Kämpfer in Chemnitz until 1925. In 1926, he became head of the central KPD news service in Berlin.

Initially Volk was in the left wing of the party, aligned with Ruth Fischer, Arkadi Maslow and Ernst Thälmann, but in 1928, he modified his views, becoming a leading member of the Conciliator faction. The ultra-left party line of the KPD leadership under Thälmann labeled the moderates social fascists, according to the position taken by the Comintern. As a result, Volk was relieved of his party functions and in a disciplinary move, sent to Hamburg, where he headed the KPD newspaper, the Hamburger Volkszeitung. After the Wittorf affair, he was relieved of this position, as well. In 1929, after the power of the Conciliator faction was weakened within the party, he continued to lead the faction discreetly, working with Georg Krausz and Heinrich Süßkind to build a Conciliator organization within the Berlin KPD.

After the seizure of power by the Nazi Party in 1933, Volk's Conciliator group went underground to fight the Nazi government, concentrating on factories. Here, as in exile, Volk maintained close contact with social democratic and socialist groups, like Neu Beginnen and the Revolutionary Socialists of Germany. Volk was forced to flee to France in 1933 and later that year, he took part in the Conciliator meeting in Zurich. His hope for a reformed KPD was strengthened after the retreat from the ultra-left party line in 1934 and the 7th Comintern Congress in 1935. However, he was disillusioned by the Moscow trials and most of all, by the execution of Nikolai Bukharin, which caused him to break with the KPD in 1938. After the outbreak of World War II, Volk was able to flee to the United States, where he lived underground until the end of the war and afterwards, as a journalist specialized in Soviet issues. During this time, he maintained political connections with the Social Democratic Party of Germany, but never joined.

== Publications ==
- Pattern for World Revolution. Chicago/New York (1947) (with Julian Gumperz, authored and edited under the pseudonym Ypsilon)
