= International Liaison Department of the Communist International =

The OMS (Russian: Отдел международной связи, otdel mezhdunarodnoy svyazi or ОМС), also known in English as the International Liaison Department (1921–1939), was "the most secret department" of the Executive Committee of the Communist International. It has also been translated as the Illegal Liaison Section and Foreign Liaison Department.

== Operations ==
In 1939, Soviet intelligence defector Walter Krivitsky described the OMS as "a worldwide network of permanently stationed agents." Moreover, "These OMS representatives hold the whip over the leaders of the Communist Party in the country where they are stationed... The most delicate job entrusted to OMS resident agents is the distribution of money to finance the Communist Parties."

In 1999, the historian Raymond W. Leonard stated, "Through the auspices of the Comintern and the OMS, foreign communist parties provided a ready-made source of ideologically dedicated agents." He also speculated that the Intelligence Section "was probably the organization required by the OMS to be present in every Communist party of liaison work with the Red Army."

In 2002, historian David McKnight stated:

The most intense practical application of the conspiratorial work of the Comintern was carried out by its international liaison service, the OMS. This body undertook clandestine courier activities and work which supported underground political activities. These included the transport of money and letters, the manufacture of passports and other false documents and technical support to underground parties, such as managing "safe houses" and establishing businesses overseas as cover activities.

In 2007, historian Nigel West provided perhaps the longest single description of the OMS in English in his book Mask. In 2011, historian Thomas L. Sakmyster stated:

The OMS was the Comintern's department for the coordination of subversive and conspiratorial activities. Some of its functions overlapped with those of the main Soviet intelligence agencies, the OGPU and the GRU, whose agents sometimes were assigned to the Comintern. But the OMS maintained its own set of operations and had its own representative on the central committees of each Communist party abroad.

In 2014, Soviet expert Boris Volodarsky called the OMS a "little known intelligence service" and referred to it as the "intelligence branch of the Comintern," preceded by the Sluzhba Svyazi or "Communication Service."

Most sources agree that the OMS "acted as an adjunct between the two main Soviet intelligence services."

Milder descriptions exist: "The OMS... arranged for financial support of parties abroad, transmitted instructions, prepared papers, took care of visiting Communist leaders quartered in Moscow's Hotel Lux..."

Radio communications formed part of OMS services, headed by David Glazer.

The falsification (not manufacture) of passports was a major function of the OMS. American passports were a particular favorite.

The OMS had its own cryptography and served as the Comintern's logistical organization.

== Major locations ==
The OMS's international headquarters resided in Berlin. Its address was 131-132 Wilhelmstrasse in the offices of Führer Verlag.

The OMS's training school lay in Kuntsevo near Moscow, with additional training available in Berlin. Other sources call it the Lenin School.

== History ==
It was founded at the Third Congress of the Comintern in July 1921. It mission was to provide support, guidance, and funding to communist parties outside Russia.

In 1923, the OMS received direction from the "Illegal Commission," headed by Mikhail Trilisser and two others.

In 1924, direction of the OMS transferred to the GRU and the OGPU.

The historian Raymond W. Leonard noted, "Between 1919 and 1922, people frequently moved back and forth between the Razvedupr and Comintern... For the rest of the interwar period, the Red Army used the Comintern, especially the OMS, primarily for agent support and as a source of recruits for its own purposes... After 1927, agents of the OMS usually acted as liaisons between the Comintern and Red Army Intelligence."

Two international raids led the OMS to distance itself from Soviet diplomatic missions. In April 1927, the Chinese police raided the Soviet military attache's office in Beijing. In May 1927, Scotland Yard raided ARCOS in London.

In the 1930s, the OMS moved increasingly toward intelligence operations. It began to fold into the OGPU in 1935 or 1937 with Trilisser's appointment. During 1937–1939, the OMS received blame as a center of counter-revolutionary activity, by which time it was "totally liquidated." Leon Trotsky noted these developments in his writings.

== Personnel ==
The first head of the OMS was the Latvian functionary Dāvids Beika. Beika was replaced by Osip Piatnitsky. In Krivitsky's assessment, this role made Piatnitsky effectively "Finance Minister and Director of Personnel" of the Comintern. Piatnitsky was purged in 1938. Mikhail Trilisser was Piatnitsky's deputy. Trilisser (as "Moskvin") succeeded Piatnitsky to head the OMS in 1937.

The OMS's representative on the Executive Committee of the Communist International (ECCI) was Jacob Mirov-Abramov, also called "chief of OMS for Europe." In 1935, Berthe Zimmermann (1902–1937), wife of Fritz Platten of Switzerland, worked for the OMS in Moscow in 1935 as head of the courier section at OMS headquarters.

In Germany, the head was Mirov-Abramov. (Krivitsky stated that Mirov-Abramove, "whom I knew for many years," was stationed there 1921–1930). Next was Hans Kippenberger (also known as "Leo" and "Alfred Langer") in the mid-1920s, a protegee of Walter Krivitsky and of Fyodor Raskolnikov's wife Larisa Reisner. Succeeding him was Fritz Burde, under whom served future author Arthur Koestler. In 1925, Richard Sorge became an OMS officer in Germany, "charged with establishing Comintern intelligence networks." Leo Flieg was the last OMS head in Germany before the Nazi electoral victory in 1933. Propagandist Willi Muenzenberg was "set up with OMS funds."

In France, the head was Henry Robinson, director of French Communist Party intelligence department and the OMS in Western Europe.

In Austria, an early head was Jakob Rudnik; by 1929, Arnold Deutsch was a member there. Deutsch traveled to Romania, Greece, British Palestine, and French Syria for the OMS. While in Austria, Kim Philby may have served as an OMS courier.

In Denmark, an OMS agent was Richard Jensen, supported by George Mink (also known to Whittaker Chambers in New York City).

In the Netherlands, the head was Henk Sneevliet.

In the UK, an OMS agent trained in radio and photography was Kitty Harris, some time mistress of Earl Browder; she handled Donald Maclean.

In China, the head was "a Russian comrade who passed himself off as an emigre" and was a friend of Arthur Ewert. In 1931, when Sorge arrived in Shanghai, OMS agents Agnes Smedley and Ruth Werner supported him. The arrest of Joseph Ducroux in 1931 in Shanghai hurt the position of the OMS globally. The "Noulens Affairs" over OMS spy Jakob Rudnik in the same year further undermined the OMS's stance. (In his memoir, Whittaker Chambers refers to the "Noulens Affair" as the "Robinson-Rubens Case".)

In Turkey, the head in the early 1920s was Mikhail Trilisser.

In the United States, the head of the OMS was Alexander Borisovich Epstein, who arrived there in 1921 and stayed through most of the decade. (Epstein was implicated later in the death of Juliet Stuart Poyntz.) The head was Solomon Vladimirovich Mikhelson-Manuilov, also known as "Black", from 1933 to 1938. Over the same period, CPUSA general secretary Earl Browder made J. Peters its OMS counterpart. Peters sought to develop a homegrown "illegal apparatus," which grew to include the Ware Group, whose best known members were Whittaker Chambers and Alger Hiss. In 1935, Peters penned The Communist Party: A Manual on Organization, which includes the following:

The Communist Party puts the interest of the working class and the Party above everything. The Party subordinates all forms of Party organization to these interests. From this it follows that one form of organization is suitable for legal existence of the Party, and another for the conditions of underground, illegal existence...

== Directors ==
- David Samuilovich Beika (1920–1921)
- Osip Aronovich Pyatnitsky (1921–1922)
- Petr Aleksandrovich Wompe (1922–1925)
- Alexander Emelyanovich Abramovich (1925–1926)
- Alexander Lazarevich Abramov-Mirov (1926–1935)
- Boris Nikolaevich Melnikov (1935–1937)
- Konstantin Petrovich Sukharev (1937–1943)

== Mentions ==
In her book, KPD co-founder Ruth Fischer says that the OMS group sent to Germany in 1923 "can well be compared with the International Brigade in Spain thirteen years later."

In his memoir (published posthumously in 1951 in French), Victor Serge (1890–1947) mentions that the OMS had failed to mention his child when entering details onto (false) Belgian passports.

In her book Before and After Stalin, Aino Kuusinen, wife of Otto Wille Kuusinen, calls the OMS "the brain and the inner sanctum of the Comintern."

== Research ==
Historian McKnight has noted, "Unlike other Comintern files, those about the OMS are still generally withheld from scholarly research."

== See also ==
- Osip Piatnitsky
- Communist International
- Cheka
- INO, ИНО, Иностранный отдел, First Chief Directorate of the KGB
- GRU
- Fifth column
