= Käthe Latzke =

German anti-Nazi political activist

Käthe Latzke

Käthe Latzke (8 May 1899 - 31 March 1945) was a German political activist (KPD) who resisted Nazism and spent most of her final twelve years in state detention. Her health having been broken, she died in Ravensbrück concentration camp.

== Life ==
Käthe Latzke came from a working-class family in Königsberg in East Prussia, which at that time was part of Germany. After leaving school she qualified as a typist. In 1916 she met the tailor and left-wing activist Hans Westermann who subsequently became her life partner. In 1918 Latze joined the Free Socialist Youth organisation. It was also in 1918 that she joined what later became the Young Communists. In 1920 she relocated to Hamburg where she and Hans Westermann moved in together. In 1924 she joined the Communist Party itself.

She also joined the AfA-Bund (trades union). Around this time she was arrested and sentenced to a month in prison for taking part in an unauthorised Demonstration. On her release she found a job with "Red Aid" ("Rote Hilfe"), a workers' welfare organisation with close links to the German and therefore, many people believed, the Soviet Communist parties. She worked in the Hamburg office of "Red Aid" between 1926 and 1930. During the later 1920s the savage internal differences in the Soviet Communist Party, which saw Stalin's potential rivals removed from positions of power and influence, were closely mirrored by divisions within the German Communist Party, which by 1930 was led by the hardline Stalinists around Ernst Thälmann. In 1930 Latze's partner, Hans Westermann, was condemned as a conciliator (Versöhnler) and expelled from the party. The accusation, which was an extremely serious one, referred to Westermann's advocacy of closer collaboration with the Social Democratic Party (SPD) in order to present a more united front on the left to resist the threat of electoral success by the extreme right. The Communist leadership were at this point strongly opposed to any sort of collaboration with the SPD, whom they characterised as "social fascists". Latze was also expelled from the party in 1929 or 1930, which involved dismissal from her job with "Red Aid", and left her unemployed.

After his exclusion from the party Westermann continued to engage politically. In his Hamburg region he became the focus of a circle of people who had, like him, been condemned as "conciliators" and expelled. The circle came to be identified as the "Westermann Group". It appears that their ideas continued to receive support, especially from trades union elements, within the Communist Party, since at the regional party conference in 1932 the leadership found it necessary to warn delegates expressly against the "machinations of the Westermann renegades" (den "Treibereien des Renegaten Westermann"). The political backdrop changed dramatically in January 1933 when the Nazis took power and converted Germany into a one-party dictatorship. Political activity (except in support of the Nazi party) became illegal. Westermann was arrested by the Gestapo in June 1933 and detained for seven months. In 1934 he held a meeting with Hermann Schubert. He was still hoping, in defiance of the changed political context, to promote greater unity between German Communists and Social Democrats. He was reconciled with the Communist Party, but by this time those in party leadership who were not in state detention had mostly fled and were living as political exiles in Paris or Moscow. The Westermann Group" disappeared, but Westermann himself remained in Germany. Westermann and Lateze were both arrested, along with other members of the former "Westermann Group" overnight on 5/6 March 1935. Westermann died, probably as a result of the torture to which he was subjected at the pre-trial detention centre, on 16 March 1935. Latzke was also subjected to appalling mistreatment, but she survived and on 26 June 1935 faced the Hamburg District High Court. She received a two-year prison sentence which she served at the Lübeck detention facility. After the two years had been spent, she was held for several more years in "protective detention" ("Schutzhaft") on the other side of the country, at the Moringen concentration camp.

In 1940 she was released. The serious mistreatment to which she had been subjected was apparent from her physical condition. She was suffering from edema (dropsy) on her legs, typhus and heart damage. Her released was made conditional on her not returning to her Hamburg home base, and she therefore settled in Stralsund. Through Paul and Magda Thürey, she nevertheless established contacts with the Hamburg based resistance group round Bernhard Bästlein. At the end of 1943, at the request of the de:Staatspolizeileitstelle HamburgHamburg Gestapo, she was rearrested, and in April 1944 she was transferred to Ravensbrück concentration camp. Here she died on 31 March 1945, following complications arising from the typhus to which she had fallen victim.
