= Boris Melnikov =

Boris Melnikov may refer to:

- Boris Melnikov (fencer)
- Boris Melnikov (diplomat)
