= Conciliator faction =

Opposition group within the KPD

The Conciliator faction was an opposition group within the Communist Party of Germany during the Weimar Republic and the Third Reich. In East Germany, after World War II, the German word for conciliator, Versöhnler, became a term for anti-Marxist political tendencies.

== Background ==
The faction emerged in the mid-1920s from the "middle group" aligned with Ernst Meyer. Meyer, a high-ranking member of the Communist Party of Germany (KPD), was elected to its central committee in 1927. Along with the faction led by Ernst Thälmann, they formed the leadership of the KPD from 1926 to 1928.

The leading people aligned with Meyer were Hugo Eberlein, Arthur Ewert, Heinrich Süßkind, Gerhart Eisler and Georg Schumann and came from the ranks of trade unionists, intellectuals and full-time KPD employees. They supported a united front with the Social Democratic Party of Germany, similar to the right wing of the KPD, aligned with August Thalheimer and Heinrich Brandler. They also pushed for active participation with the Federation of General Trade Unions in Germany (Allgemeiner Deutscher Gewerkschaftsbund), a federation of socialist trade unions. They opposed the ultra-left policies of the Revolutionary Trade Union Opposition against the International Federation of Trade Unions, who were social democrats. Adopted in 1928 by the Profintern, the party line branded the social democrats as "social fascists". The Conciliator faction refrained from criticizing the hegemony of the Communist Party of the Soviet Union in the Comintern and they rejected all suggestions of a split in the KPD.

A series of events between 1928 and 1930 led to a loss of their influence in the KPD. In autumn 1928, there was a scandal involving a close friend of Thälmann, John Wittorf, who was accused of embezzling between 1,500 and 3,000 Reichsmark from the KPD. He was defended by Thälmann, despite his guilt. Afterward, Thälmann was deposed from the party's central committee, with support of the Conciliator faction. Thälmann was soon reinstated by Joseph Stalin and the Conciliator faction was driven out of the KPD leadership. With Meyer's death in early 1930, the Conciliator faction lost a large part of its influence in the KPD and afterward, found themselves needing to be discreet. Pressure from Stalin led to the expulsion and defamation of several members. Individual, unaffiliated Conciliator groups began to emerge. In Hamburg, a group was formed by Hans Westermann in Hamburg. Eduard Wald founded the Committee for Proletarian Unity (Komitee für Proletarische Einheit) working primarily in Hanover. Others joined the Socialist Workers' Party (SAP) or the Social Democratic Party (SPD).

After 1933, when the Nazi Party seized control of the government, the Conciliators joined the German Resistance, both unaffiliated groups and those still in the KPD, such as the "Berlin Opposition" aligned with Karl Volk and Georg Krausz. There was a meeting of Conciliators in Zurich in 1933 and one group published a magazine in exile, called Funke. By 1940, many Conciliator groups had disintegrated, primarily because of repression by the Gestapo. Other prominent members, such as Eberlein and Süßkind, fell victim to the stalinist purges. Most members who survived the Nazi regime and war either rejoined the KPD and later the Socialist Unity Party of Germany (SED) in the Soviet occupation zone, while some joined the SPD.

== Postwar term ==
After the war, the German word for conciliator, versöhnler, was used in the German Democratic Republic (GDR) to refer to anti-Marxist tendencies. The term had been previously used by Vladimir Lenin, Leon Trotsky and Joseph Stalin to vilify certain party members. The third party convention of the SED continued the attack on Social Democratism, with propaganda including the fight against all liberalism and conciliatory tendencies as essential to the fight's effectiveness. The 1984 Handbuch der deutschen Gegenwartsprache ("Handbook of German Contemporary Speech") published in the GDR defined versöhnler as "within the labor movement, someone who exhibits unprincipled anti-marxist behavior, fomenting right or left opportunism".

== Members ==
=== Leaders ===
- Ernst Meyer
- Hugo Eberlein
- Gerhart Eisler
- Arthur Ewert
- Georg Schumann
- Heinrich Süßkind

=== Reichstag deputies ===
- Eduard Alexander
- Adolf Ende
- Josef Miller
- Heinrich Schmitt
- Johannes Schröter

=== Other members ===
- Fritz Ausländer
- Karl Albin Becker
- Oswald Bleier
- Heinrich Blücher
- Heinz Brandt
- Fritz Charpentier
- Adolf Deter
- Karl Borromäus Frank
- Marianne Gundermann
- Johannes Holm
- Georg Krausz
- Bernard Koenen
- Harry Kuhn
- Heinrich Kurella
- Käthe Latzke
- Siegmund Neumann
- Philipp Pless
- Albert Sanneck
- Richard Schnetter
- Robert Siewert
- Heinrich Stahmer
- Otto Unger
- Karl Volk
- Eduard Wald
- Hans Westermann
