= Jakob Rudnik =

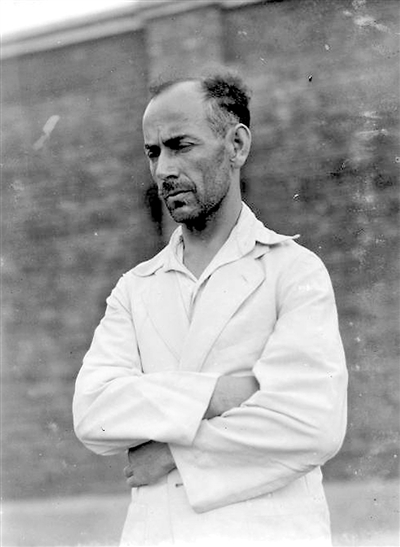
Jakob Rudnik

Jakob Rudnik (24 March 1894–13 March 1963) was a Ukrainian-born agent for the Otdel Mezhdunarodny Sviasy (OMS), which was the Communist International's clandestine International Liaison Department.

== Noulens Affair ==
Rudnik rose to notoriety in 1931 under the nom de guerre Hilaire Noulens when he was arrested in Shanghai along with his wife Tatiana Moissenko by the Special Branch of the Shanghai Municipal Police.

As a result of the actions of the propagandist Willi Münzenberg an international press furore was generated about the case. Celebrities such as Albert Einstein, H.G. Wells, Madame Sun Yat-sen, and Henri Barbusse became involved in the International Noulens/Ruegg Defence Committee that was established and the case was discussed in both the British House of Commons and the United States Senate.

News of the couple's fate, which had previously been the subject of press speculation, was soon overshadowed by events following the Japanese invasion of the Chinese administered areas of the city of Shanghai on 28 January 1932, following the Mukden Incident.

== Later discoveries ==
For almost 60 years, the identity of Noulens was incorrectly thought to be Paul Ruegg. Thus, in the few works that deal with the arrest of Rudnik and his wife on 15 June 1931, this mistake is common.

In his memoir Witness (1952), Whittaker Chambers refers to the "Noulens Affair" as the "Robinson-Rubens Case" and refers to Rudnik and "Richard Robinson-Rubens."

It was only in an article by Dr. Frederick Litten in the China Quarterly in 1994 that Noulens' real identity was exposed.

== See also ==
- International Liaison Department
- Whittaker Chambers
