= Horst Scheffler =

German painter, teacher and graphic artist

Horst Scheffler (born April 26, 1935, in Heinrichswalde) is a German painter, teacher, and graphic artist. His work has been exhibited as Concrete Art (Konkreten Kunst), and Rudolf Arnheim in 1974 wrote of the "particularly modern, teasing dynamics" of his work. Since 1969, Scheffler has lived and worked in Bremen.

== Education and teaching career ==
From 1949 to 1952, Scheffler was an apprentice carpenter in Mittelhessen. From 1953 to 1955, he attended the Werkkunstschule in Hanau, and from 1956 to 1958 the Werkkunstschule in Hamburg, where he was a pupil of Max Hermann Mahlmann. In 1968 he studied in Switzerland, where he became acquainted with Richard Paul Lohse and Camille Graeser, followed in 1969 by a study visit to West Berlin and a scholarship from the city of Bremen. In 1970 he went to Paris, where he made the acquaintance of Leo Breuer. In 1971 he received the Förderpreis of the city of Bremen. From 1971 to 1998 he worked full-time as an art and crafts teacher in Bremen. In 1979 he went to the United States, where he visited Rudolf Arnheim, among others.

== Design themes; critical reception and analyses ==
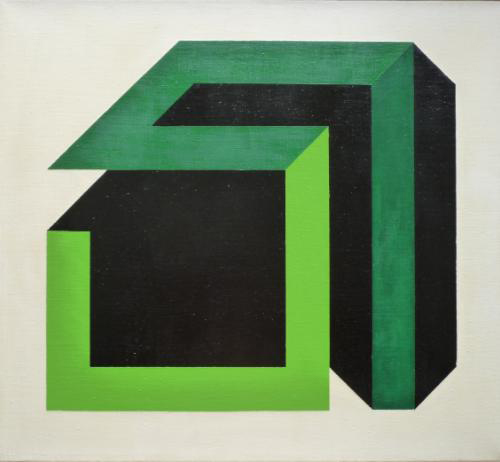
Gegenwinkel-Modulation II, 1978, oil on canvas, 45 × 50 cm.

In the catalogue for Scheffler's Modulare Malerei und Objekte exhibit in Bremen in 1971, Günter Busch wrote:

Scheffler's work [is] a particular form of Concrete Art…But in his picture panels, the rational function gives way to the irrational. The surfaces work together in the immanent alternating dynamics of known color experiences, surface experiences, spatial experiences, to show the viewer double polarity; polar tensions dominate the picture. Scheffler would like to set himself apart from the practitioners of Concrete Art, for whom the picture can be grasped completely rationally, for whom—as Max Bill says—the picture must be completely solvable. Like Albers, Scheffler sees the irrational power of color. He writes: "For me, images are essential for the area that cannot be grasped rationally."

In the same catalogue, Scheffler himself addressed "The Problem of Space in the Fine Arts," writing:

The concept of space has changed. For centuries, space was understood as the interior space enclosed by surfaces. Euclid's definition "space is the content of a body" is perceived as a restriction with regard to the effective spatiality of the colors. Just as non-Euclidean geometry changed spatial thinking in mathematics through the emergence of the space-time concept, artistic creation of space, awareness of space, has expanded.…At all times man has had a special but flexible relationship to the space he is aware of, in which he has established himself materially on the one hand and spiritually on the other. Our time has created new relations, raised new standpoints and new points of view on the question of space.

In the 1974 edition of Art and Visual Perception, Rudolf Arnheim discussed Scheffler's 1971 painting Gegenwinkel-Modulation:

Figure 198 is a black-and-white reproduction of a painting by Horst Scheffler. It uses isometric perspective in combination with frontality to study the ambiguous interplay between flatness and depth. The short oblique edge in the center is seen as a part of the isometric tilt into depth when approached from the left, but as a leaning edge in the frontal plane when approached from below. The parallelism maintained in isometric perspective lends itself to being forced back into the frontal plane, at least for brief moments, and the instability of the balance between second and third dimensions produces a particularly modern, teasing dynamics.

In the catalogue for Scheffler's retrospective exhibit in 1986, Jürgen Weichardt wrote:

"Geometry is the study of the ability to construct events," says Horst Scheffler; with this sentence he gets to the heart of his paintings and drawings. His proximity to mathematical and geometric thinking as a design principle opens up a canon of diverse constructivist pictorial ideas from optical-logical and objective-logical pictorial vocabulary.

Writing about Scheffler's appearance, at age 84, at an exhibition of his works in Bremen in 2020, culture reporter Rolf Stein described the experience of viewing Scheffler's work in plainer terms:

Standing in front of Scheffler's oil painting Modified Space and staring at it can cause capers in the mind. Do you look at the red areas from below or from above? Is the bottom of this space an oval, or a circle that looks like an oval because of the perspective? And the black surface that cuts through the possibly cylindrical space—is it partially hidden from our view above? Perceptions engage in a dance with no resolution waiting at the end.

Elements of his works spanning a 60-year career include: number-oriented divisions and combinatorics; modular painting and objects; serial cubic and angular themes; programmed grids with flexible elements; and wall designs in public buildings.

== Solo exhibitions ==
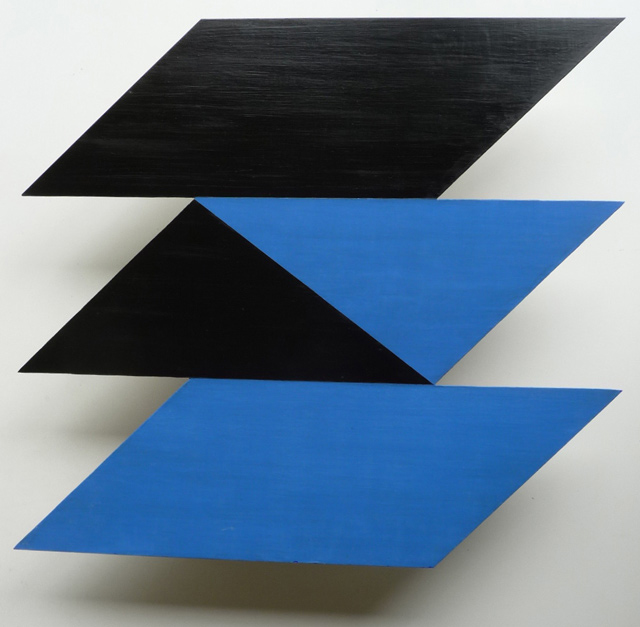
Äqui-Balance, 1974, oil on aluminium plate, 50 × 50 cm.

- 1964 Hamburg, Stadtpark Water Tower Planetarium
- 1967 Bremen-Nord, Community Center: painting, graphics, plastic
- 1968 Bremen, Galerie im Schüsselkorb
- 1969 Hagen/Westphalia, Karl Ernst Osthaus Museum
- 1970 Hamburg, Galerie Fürneisen-Dröscher
- 1971 Bremen, Kunsthalle: Modulare Malerei und Objekte
- 1971 Hannover, T-Galerie
- 1971 Berlin, Schöneberg Art Office
- 1972 Nuremberg, Galerie Keresztes: pictures, graphics, play objects
- 1972 Cologne, Galerie Reckermann: polar modulations
- 1972 Oldenburg, State Museum
- 1974 Bremen, Kabinett 2, Galerie Werner
- 1974 Amsterdam, Galerie van Hulsen
- 1980 Worpswede, Kunsthalle Friedrich Netzel
- 1984 Bremen, Kunsthalle Kupferstichkabinett
- 1986 Bremen, Galerie Uwe Michael: Konstruktive Bilder von 1958-1986 (retrospective exhibit)
- 2004 Bremen, Italian Consulate
- 2010 Quedlinburg, Palais Salfeld

== International exhibitions ==
In group shows, along with many venues in Germany, Sheffler has exhibited internationally in New York City, Los Angeles, Chicago, San Francisco, Kraków, Lausanne, Milan, and Tokyo.

== Selected works ==
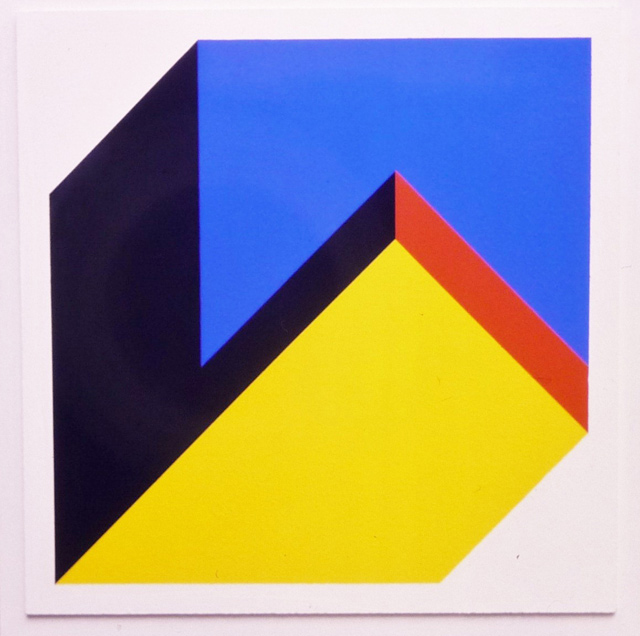
Untitled, 1977, casein tempera on chipboard, 59 × 59 cm.

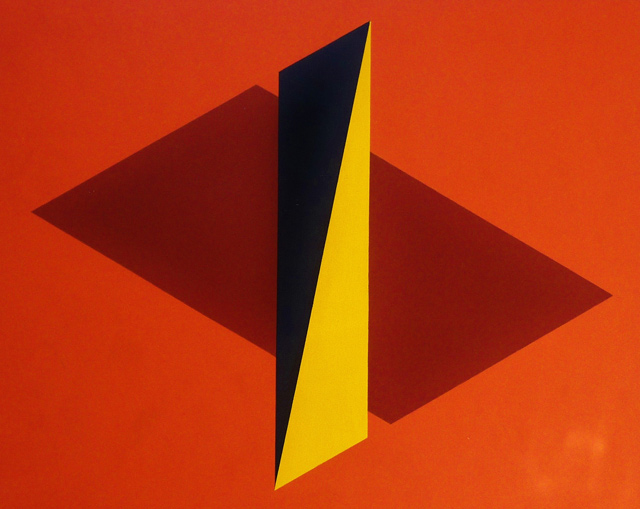
Apollonian Sound, 1977, oil on canvas, 60 × 75 cm.

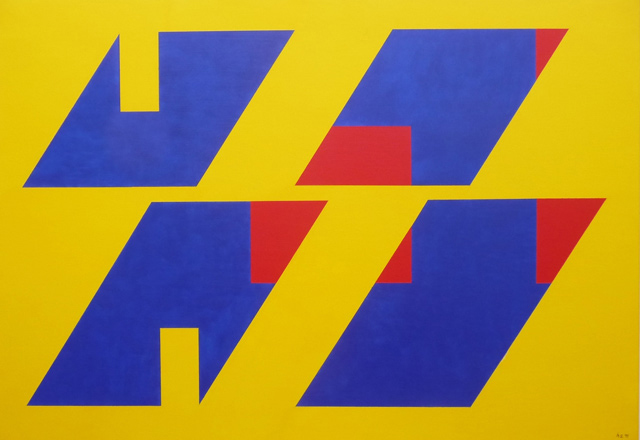
Configured Energy, 2011, oil on canvas, 70 × 100 cm.

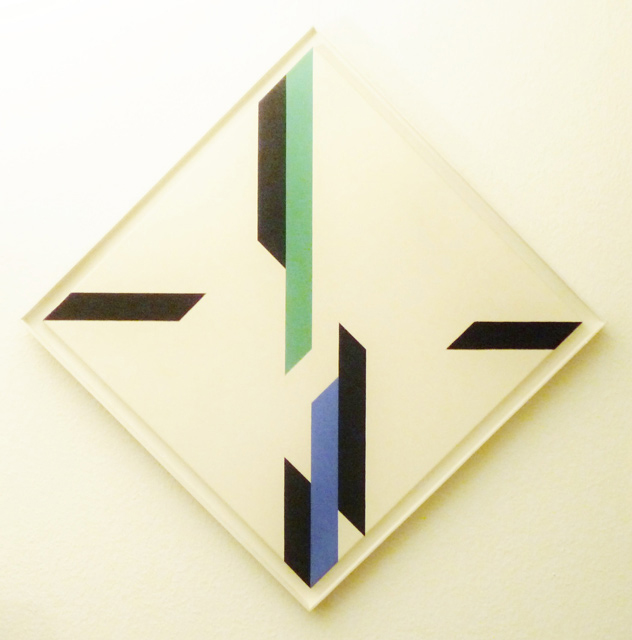
Bi-Axial Space Modulation, 2014, KHD on canvas, 107 × 107 cm.
