= Harry Tisch =

East German politician and trade unionist (1927–1995)

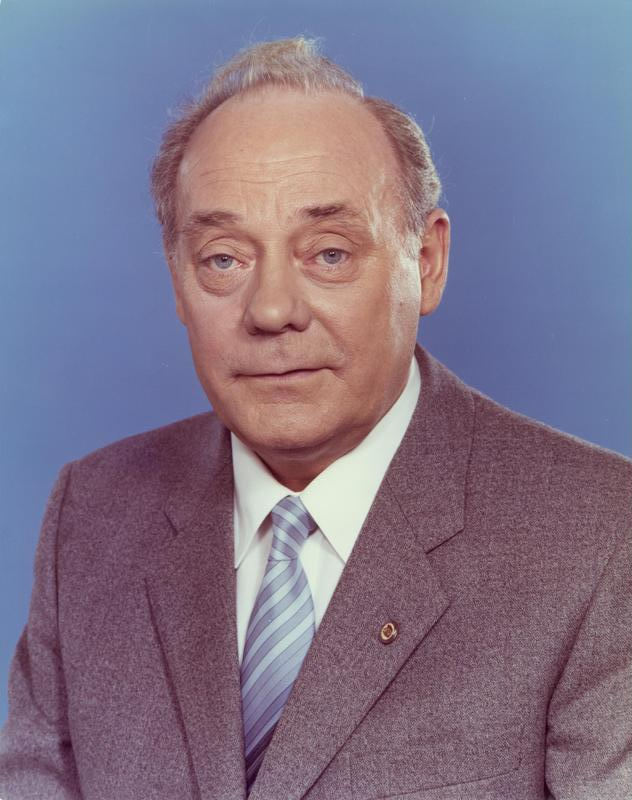
- Tisch in 1983

Chairman of the Free German Trade Union Federation
- In office 26 April 1975 – 2 November 1989
- Deputy: Wolfgang Beyreuther; Johanna Töpfer
- Preceded by: Herbert Warnke
- Succeeded by: Annelis Kimmel

First Secretary of the Socialist Unity Party in Bezirk Rostock
- In office 21 July 1961 – 29 April 1975
- Second Secretary: Ernst Timm; Heinz Lange
- Preceded by: Karl Mewis
- Succeeded by: Ernst Timm

Personal details
- Born: 28 March 1927 Heinrichswalde, Province of Pomerania, Free State of Prussia, Weimar Republic (now Mecklenburg-Vorpommern, Germany)
- Died: 18 June 1995 (aged 68) Berlin, Germany
- Party: Socialist Unity Party (1946–1989)
- Other political affiliations: Communist Party of Germany (1945–1946)
- Education: Party Academy Karl Marx
- Occupation: Politician; Civil Servant; Union Official; Locksmith
- Awards: Patriotic Order of Merit, 1st class; Order of Karl Marx
- Central institution membership: 1975–1989: Full member, Politburo of the Central Committee; 1971–1975: Candidate member, Politburo of the Central Committee; 1963–1989: Full member, Central Committee; Other offices held: 1975–1989: Member, State Council; 1963–1989: Member, Volkskammer; 1959–1961: Chairman, Bezirk Rostock Council; 1955–1959: Secretary for the Economy, Socialist Unity Party in Bezirk Rostock; 1950–1952: Member, Landtag of Mecklenburg-Vorpommern

Harry Tisch (March 28, 1927, Heinrichswalde – June 18, 1995) was an East German politician and trade unionist who served as Chairman of the Free German Trade Union Federation between 1975 and 1989. He was also a member of the State Council from 1976 until he was forced to resign in November 1989.

== Early career ==
Following World War II, Tisch worked as a locksmith in Ueckermünde and joined the Socialist Unity Party of Germany, the German Free Youth League and the German Free Trade Unions. From 1948 to 1953 he held several leading positions. From 1953 to 1955 he studied at the Karl Marx Higher Party School.

== Career and awards ==
He was a recipient of the Patriotic Order of Merit in Gold in 1969 and the Order of Karl Marx in 1977.

== Following the collapse of the GDR ==
In a trial for profiting from his position, to the tune of $71 million, Tisch was sentenced in 1991 to 18 months in prison and released after serving 14 months in pre-trial detention. He died of heart failure in 1995. Harry Tisch was a fan of the German football club FC Hansa Rostock.
