= Orli Wald =

Member of German Resistance to Nazi Germany

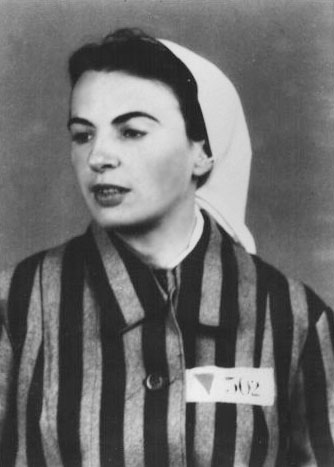
Orli Wald on arrival at Auschwitz, March 26, 1942

Orli Reichert-Wald (July 1, 1914 – January 1, 1962) was a member of the German Resistance in Nazi Germany. She was arrested in 1936 and charged with high treason, whereupon she served four and a half years in a women's prison, followed by "protective custody" in Nazi concentration camps until 1945, when she escaped.

She was a prisoner functionary in the infirmary at Auschwitz-Birkenau and because of her helpfulness to Jewish and other prisoners, was called the "Angel of Auschwitz". After the war, Wald was often ill with physical problems stemming from illness during her confinement. She was also plagued by depression, unable to cope with her memories of the concentration camps, and she made numerous suicide attempts. She wrote stories about her experiences in an attempt to overcome the past, but she died at the age of 48 in a psychiatric hospital.

== Early years ==
Wald was born Aurelia Torgau in Bourell, near Maubeuge, France, the sixth child of a German couple, Maria and August Torgau. Her father, a skilled worker, found work in France as a locomotive mechanic, but World War I broke out weeks after Wald's birth and the family was interned.

Although her father was kept in detention until 1919, her mother and the children were forced to leave France. They went to Luxembourg, but were forced to leave there as well, ending up in Trier, Germany in 1916. After his release, August Torgau joined the family in Trier, where he became active in the Communist movement. Wald graduated from school in Trier, then completed an apprenticeship as a sales clerk. In the 1920s, she became a member of the Young Communist League of Germany (YCLG), as did her brothers, Fritz and Willhelm, called Willi.

== Nazi era ==
After the Nazis seized control of the government in 1933, she became involved in political resistance, smuggling educational pamphlets into Germany. This work led to her arrest in 1934, but lack of evidence caused the matter to be dropped and she resumed her activities.

In 1934, she was married to a construction worker and YCLG member, Friedrich-Wilhelm (Fritz) Reichert in 1935, but the marriage lasted only six months. Reichert, who turned his support toward the Nazis and became a member of the Sturmabteilung (SA), filed for separation in 1936. In June 1936, her resistance cell was arrested and charged with high treason, a charge punishable by execution. presumably because of incriminating statements made by her husband, who denounced her.

On December 21, 1936, aged 22, she was sentenced to four and a half years at hard labor and was taken the same day to the Ziegenhain women's prison. She served four years at Ziegenhain, three of them in solitary confinement. Her mother made several efforts to win clemency for her, but to no avail.

Reichert divorced her in 1939 on the grounds that he was "known to the Nazis" and was a member of the SA. In 1940, despite having served her full sentence, Wald, then known as Orli Reichert, was not released, but was sent to Ravensbrück concentration camp, where she was held in "protective custody" as a danger to the Third Reich. She was made to wear the "red triangle", designating her as a political prisoner and she became friends with Margarete Buber-Neumann. In March 1942, she was transferred to Auschwitz and became prisoner number 502. She was sent to work at the prisoner infirmary and herself became sick the following winter. Seeing her situation as hopeless, she attempted suicide with sleeping pills, but was saved and she recovered. In 1943, she became Lagerälteste, putting her in a better position to help other prisoners. At the notorious infirmary, headed by Josef Mengele, she witnessed numerous Nazi crimes, including the killing of newborn babies with injections of phenol, while the mothers were sent to the gas chamber, as well as Nazi medical experiments on prisoners, and the "selections," by which doctors determine which sick prisoners would be gassed rather than cured. As Lagerälteste, she sometimes had to assist Mengele in the selections, although she was able to save many others.

Wald continued to work in the German resistance, even while imprisoned. She risked her life to help and save Jewish and other prisoners, earning her the name "Angel of Auschwitz". She survived the January 1945 death march from Auschwitz to Ravensbrück and Malchow concentration camp, which she was able to escape with a group of women in April 1945. She was found by Soviet soldiers, who then raped her.

== After World War II ==
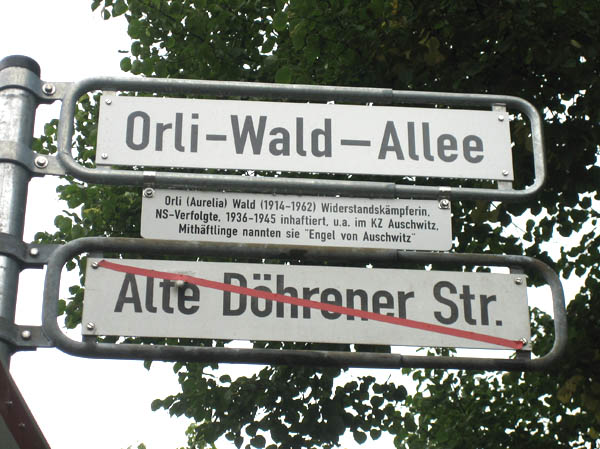
Road named for Orli Wald at the Hannover cemetery where she is buried

As a result of her imprisonment, she was unable to drop her married surname of Reichert, which was required for her to receive the Haftentschädigung (financial compensation for imprisonment) and later, government aid to meet rising medical costs stemming from her confinement.

She met Eduard Wald after the war in the Carl von Ossietzky Sanatorium, then run by the Union of Persecutees of the Nazi Regime in Sülzhayn, in the Harz mountains. An editor, he had also been a German resistance fighter and had been imprisoned at Brandenburg-Görden. They were married in November 1947 and moved to Hannover, where he had previously lived. Both she and her husband, who later became a politician and trade unionist, had fought the stalinization of the Socialist Unity Party of Germany and joined the Social Democrats.

Wald wrote short biographical stories in an attempt to overcome the traumatic experiences of the concentration camps, and until her death suffered both physically and mentally from the effects of her imprisonment. Along with the memories she could not forget, she could no longer bear to hear music, which reminded her of the Auschwitz orchestra, which had played for incoming transports of prisoners. Succumbing often to depression, she attempted suicide numerous times, and ended up addicted to the drugs given to her for the depression. After being scheduled to testify in the Frankfurt Auschwitz Trials, which she wanted to do, her memories became so overpowering to her, she suffered a complete mental breakdown and died in a psychiatric clinic in Ilten, near Hanover at the age of 48.

== Legacy ==
There is a small street in the Wettbergen neighborhood of Hannover named Reicherthof. Relatives and friends objected to the street name, which used the name of her first husband, who was likely responsible for her arrest.

As a result, in 2007, the city of Hannover renamed a street near the Engesohde cemetery, where she is buried, after Orli Wald. On February 23, 2007, a stolperstein in the name Orli Torgau-Wald was laid in Trier, where she had previously lived.

== Publications ==
- Nachgelassenes - Schriften von Orli Wald in Der dunkle Schatten
- Orli Wald-Reichert, Das Taschentuch in H. G. Adler, Hermann Langbein & Ella Lingens-Reiner, editors: Auschwitz. Zeugnisse und Berichte. Europäische Verlagsanstalt, Cologne (1979); ISBN 3-434-00411-4 pp. 105 - 108 (Note: Eyewitness testimony and report about a killing through poison injection by the SS in Auschwitz of a blind girl, the daughter of a German officer, according to statements by the Polish mother. Thüringer Volk, April 10, 1948. The killer with the injection was Hans Nierzwicki (1905-1967), who remained unpunished after 1945.)

== Sources ==
- Bernd Steger, Günter Thiele, ed. Peter Wald, Der dunkle Schatten. Leben mit Auschwitz. Erinnerungen an Orli Reichert-Wald. Schüren, Marburg (1989) ISBN 3-924800-57-X
  - expanded and re-published: Steger & Wald, Hinter der grünen Pappe. Orli Wald im Schatten von Auschwitz. Leben und Erinnerungen. VSA-Verlag Hamburg (2008) ISBN 978-3-89965-322-9
- Hermann Langbein, Menschen in Auschwitz. Europa, Vienna (1996) ISBN 3-203-51145-2 (also published by Ullstein)
- Margarete Glas-Larsson, "Ich will reden!" G. Botz, Vienna (1981) ISBN 3-217-01186-4
- Adélaïde Hautval, Medizin gegen die Menschlichkeit. Die Weigerung einer nach Auschwitz deportierten Ärztin, an medizinischen Experimenten teilzunehmen. Karl Dietz, Berlin (2008) ISBN 978-3-320-02154-2
- Ella Lingens-Rainer, Gefangene der Angst. Berliner Taschenbuchverlag (2005) ISBN 3-8333-0152-X
- Bruno Baum, Widerstand in Auschwitz. VVN, Berlin (1949) p. 25; also Congress, Berlin (1962) p. 80 (Note: Wald is referred to as Orly Reichert. Baum later a Socialist Unity Party functionary.)
- Edu Wald papers, Confederation of German Trade Unions-Archiv, Düsseldorf and Archiv der sozialen Demokratie
