= Boris Melnikov (diplomat) =

Soviet politician (1896–1938)

- Born: January 2, 1896; Selenginsk, Russian Empire
- Died: July 29, 1938 (aged 42); Moscow, Soviet Union
- Education: Mikhailovsky Artillery School
- Political party: All-Union Communist Party (Bolsheviks) (1917-); Russian Social Democratic Labour Party (1916-1917)
- Awards: Order of the Red Banner
- Military Service
- Allegiance: Russian SFSR; Russian Empire
- Branch: Red Army; Imperial Russian Army
- Conflicts: Russian Civil War; Far Eastern Front (POW); First World War; Eastern Front

Boris Nikolayevich Melnikov (Russian: Борис Николаевич Мельников; 2 January 1896 – 29 July 1938) was a Soviet intelligence officer and diplomat.

== Biography ==
Boris Melnikov was born in to the family of a state employee. He moved to Petrograd for work in 1915 and joined the RSDLP(b) in 1916.

He was drafted in the Imperial Russian Army in 1916 and graduated from the Mikhailovsky Artillery School, in 1917. After the Russian Revolution he was a member and secretary of the Irkutsk Revolutionary Committee and until 1918 chairman of the Troitskosav Council. In July 1918 Melnikov was taken prisoner by the Japanese, in December 1918 he regained his freedom, emigrated to China, was arrested and released in 1920.

He became a member of the Military Revolutionary Committee and Amur Regional Committee of the RCP(b) and a military commissar of the Amur Front Staff. From December 21, 1920, to July 13, 1921, he was a member of the Military Revolutionary Council of the 2nd Amur Army of the Far Eastern Republic. From August to September 1921 a soldier of the Amur Infantry Division, from September 21 to December 18, 1921, commander of the troops of the Seaside Military District, and from December 18, 1921, to May 2, 1922, a member of the Military-Revolutionary Council of the Eastern Front of the Far Eastern Republic and at the same time chairman of the Seaside Regional Committee of the RCP (b).

In 1922, he was assistant to the head of the Intelligence Directorate of the Red Army Staff and assistant to the commander-in-chief in Siberia, and head of the Department of the 2nd Agentural Section of the Intelligence Directorate of the Red Army Staff, 1923–1924, an employee of the Board of the Plenipotentiary of the People's Commissariat of Foreign Affairs of the USSR in Harbin, and from 1924 to 1928 head of the department at the Intelligence Directorate of the Red Army and head of the Far Eastern Department of the NKID of the USSR.

From 1928 to 1931 he was consul general of the USSR in Harbin and at the same time a member of the Board of the Chinese Eastern Railway, from June to August 1931 he was chargé d'affaires of the USSR in Japan.

From October 1936 to May 1937 Melnikov was the head of the International Liaison Department of the Comintern Executive Committee and served under the pseudonym Boris Muller. On February 21, 1933, he was awarded the Order of the Red Banner.

On April 28, 1937, the NKVD head Nikolai Yezhov sent a special message to Joseph Stalin about B. N. Melnikov calling for his arrest. Melnikov and multiple of his coworkers were arrested on May 4, 1937. During his interrogation, Melnikov admitted to being a Japanese spy since his capture by the Japanese army in 1918. He also testified to being a spy for the Germans from 1933, being recruited by Alexander Abramov-Mirov.

He was sentenced to death after a twenty-minute trial in November 1937 and executed on July 29, 1938.

Boris Melnikov was rehabilitated in 1956.
