= Fritz Platten =

Swiss communist politician (1883-1942)

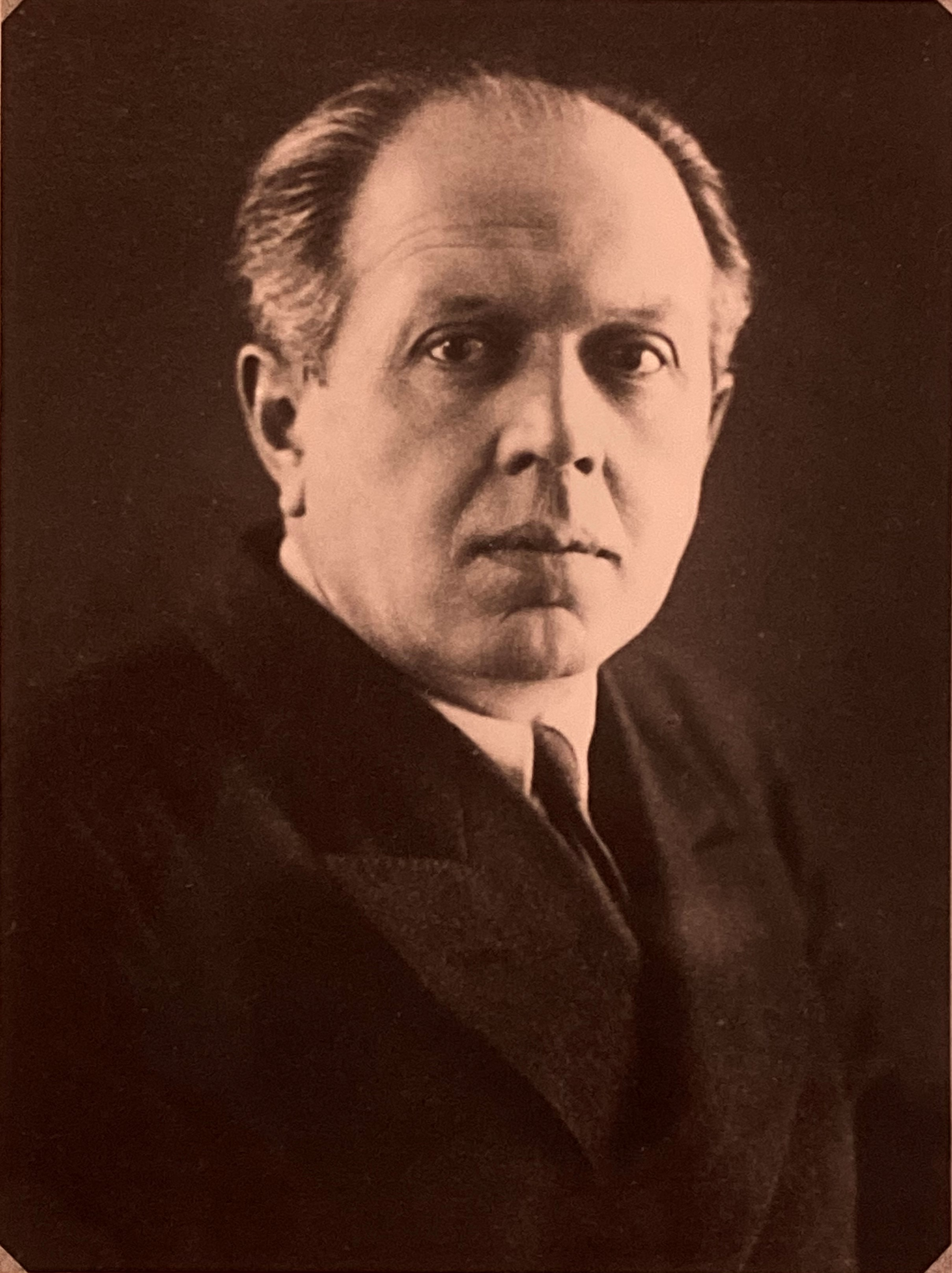
- Portrait of Fritz Platten

Member of the National Council
- In office 3 December 1917 – 3 December 1922
- Constituency: Zürich

Personal details
- Born: 8 July 1883 St. Gallen, Canton of St. Gallen, Switzerland
- Died: 22 April 1942 (aged 58) Nyandoma, Russian SFSR, Soviet Union
- Party: Social Democratic Party of Switzerland; Communist Party of Switzerland

Fritz Platten (8 July 1883 – 22 April 1942) was a Swiss communist politician and one of the founders of the Communist International.

== Early life ==
Platten was born in the village of Tablat, now part of St. Gallen, on 8 July 1883, to an Old Catholic family. He was the son of Maria Strässle and Peter Platten, a German carpenter and innkeeper. Having moved to Zürich in 1892, he worked as an apprentice locksmith from 1898 to 1902. After working various jobs, Platten took part in the First Russian Revolution in Riga, in 1906, for which he was jailed until escaping to Switzerland in 1908.

== Career ==
Platten began his political career as a member of the Social Democratic Party of Switzerland, of which he was secretary between 1915 and 1919. In the 1917 federal election he was elected as a member of the National Council for the canton of Zürich, where he served until 1923. In 1921, along with other dissidents from the left wing of the Social Democrats, Platten was one of the founding members of the Communist Party of Switzerland.

After the collapse of the Second International, Platten joined the Zimmerwald Movement.

Fritz Platten is mostly known for having been the main organizer of Lenin’s return trip from exile in Switzerland back home to Russia after the February Revolution. Due to the First World War, the trip was not easily arranged, but Lenin and his company traveled through Germany in a sealed train car. They then took the ferry to Sweden and were greeted in Stockholm by the Swedish communist leaders Otto Grimlund, Ture Nerman, Carl Lindhagen and Fredrik Ström, who together with Platten had helped plan the trip. The train journey then continued through northern Sweden and Finland back to Russia and St Petersburg.

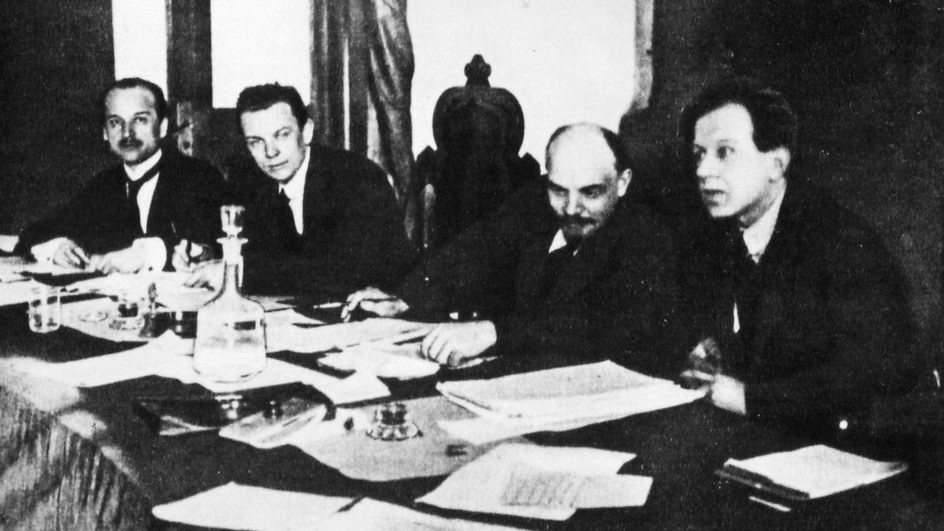
Platten (right) and Lenin in Moscow, at the Presidium of the First Congress of the Communist International

Platten participated in the foundation of the Communist International, and, as a representative of the Swiss Communist Party, spent much time in the Soviet Union.

Platten was present when Lenin’s car was attacked in Petrograd on 14 January 1918 (1 January O.S.). The two were riding in the back of the car after having given a public speech at Mikhailovsky Manege. When the shooting started "Platten grabbed Lenin by the head and pushed him down. ... Platten’s hand was covered in blood, having been grazed by a bullet as he was shielding Lenin."

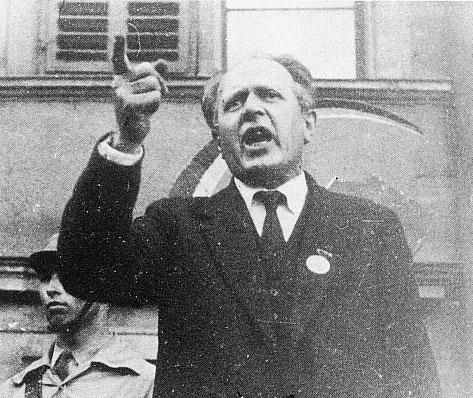
Fritz Platten speaking, approx. 1930

== Death ==
Platten became a victim of the Stalinist purges of the 1930s. He was arrested in 1938 and moved to a prison camp near Nyandoma in 1939, where he was shot on 22 April 1942. He was rehabilitated in 1956.

== Personal life ==
Platten was married to Berthe Zimmermann (1902-1937), also from Switzerland. In 1935, she was a top functionary for the OMS in Moscow as head of the courier section at the headquarters of the OMS or International Liaison Department, the most secret section of the Comintern.
