= Hans Westermann =

German politician

Hans Westermann (July 17, 1890 – March 16, 1935) was a German Communist, politician and fighter in the German Resistance against the Third Reich. He died in Nazi custody days after being arrested by the Gestapo.

== Biography ==
Westermann was born in Hamburg and was trained as a tailor. He joined the Social Democratic Party of Germany (SPD) in 1910, where he was a member of the left wing and volunteered in several capacities. in 1914, he was drafted into the navy, though opposed to the war. During this period, Westermann sympathized with the Spartacus League and the Independent Social Democratic Party of Germany. In November 1918, during the German Revolution of 1918–1919, he was elected delegate of the minesweeper flotilla in the Kiel Sailors' council. In 1919, he joined the Communist Party of Germany (KPD) and in 1921, became the full-time party secretary in Hamburg, where he was primarily responsible for the Works council.

In 1925, Westermann was briefly expelled from the KPD after he advocated a waiver of Ernst Thälmann's candidacy in favor of Social Democrat Otto Braun, a tactical move meant to thwart a victory by Paul von Hindenburg in the second round of the German presidential election in 1925. He was readmitted after the ultra-left leadership of Ruth Fischer and Arkadi Maslow was removed and in 1927, he was elected to the Hamburg district leadership of the KPD. A short time later, he was elected to the Hamburg Parliament. Within the KPD, Westermann was considered to be a trade union expert. He was aligned with the Conciliator faction and was opposed to the increasingly militant verbal attacks by the ultra-left party leadership under Thälmann, particularly with regard to trade union policy, which was elevating the position of Revolutionary Trade Union Opposition policy. Westermann was also aligned with those in favor of closer ties and cooperative efforts with the SPD. These positions caused Westermann to be expelled from the party in 1930 along with Heinrich Stahmer and Albert Sanneck, also Conciliators. Westermann then resigned his parliamentary seat and, with his common-law wife, founded in Hamburg his own independent and unnamed Conciliator group, sometimes referred to the "Westermann Group".

After the Nazis seized power in 1933, Westermann's group began working underground, focusing on dock and shipyard workers and employees. Westermann was arrested and kept in detention between June 1933 and August 1934. On his release, made contact with other Conciliator groups both within and outside the KPD, such as the Committee for Proletarian Unity, founded by Eduard Wald. His relationships with the KPD improved and he and his group were again admitted into the party in 1935. Shortly after he had begun reorganizing the Hamburg party, which had been weakened by Gestapo attacks, Westermann and numerous others were arrested late March 5, 1935 or early March 6. A few days later, Westermann was killed at KoLaFu in Hamburg.
