= Elise Saborovsky Ewert =

German communist activist

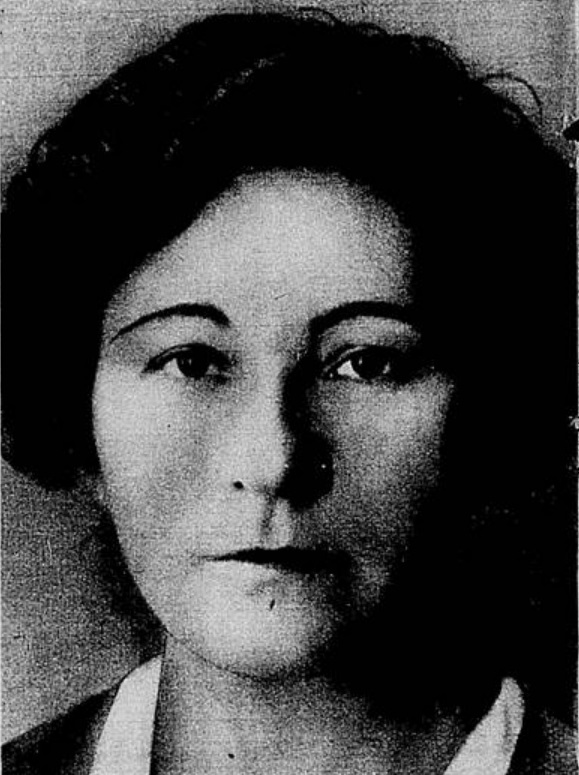
- Ewert around 1936
- Other names: Berger, Elisabeth, Machla, Macha Lenczycki, Sabo

Elise Saborovsky Ewert (born November 14, 1886 in Hanover, Germany; died 1939 or 1940, in Ravensbrück concentration camp) was a German communist activist who worked around the world, but is most known for her work in Brazil during the 1930s.

== Biography ==
Ewert was born in Hanover to Polish parents. She worked as a secretary and typist. She met and became a partner to Arthur Ewert in the 1914, though they would not marry until 1922. She became politically active in 1913. A year later, she and Ewert moved to Canada and was interned due to her political activities. Traveling to the United States, she became a photographer.

She later returned to Germany and, in 1920, joined the Communist Party of Germany. Ewert then became a member of the Comintern. She and her husband traveled to China on a secret mission in 1932. They were in the Soviet Union during 1934.

They arrived in Brazil in March 1935 (under false names with American passports) and were fundamental to the establishment of the National Liberation Alliance in July. A few days later, President Getúlio Vargas declared it illegal and it became an underground organization dedicated to planning the government's overthrow.

After the failure of the Brazilian communist uprising of 1935, they were arrested in Rio de Janeiro. The Ewerts were tortured, including in front of each other, and Elise was sexually assaulted. In 1936 or 1937, she was deported to Germany and handed over to the Gestapo.

She was first held at Lichtenburg concentration camp. Though some sources state that she escaped to France, Ewert most likely died in Ravensbrück concentration camp in 1939 or 1940.
