= Eduard Wald =

German Communist politician and trade unionist

Eduard Wald (10 March 1905 – 5 November 1978) was a Communist politician, trade unionist and member of the German Resistance against Nazism.

== Biography ==
Eduard Wald, known as Edu, was born in Kiel, Germany, where he attended school. He reached upper school, then received training as a gardener between 1921 and 1923. By 1923, he was already a member of the Young Communist League of Germany and in 1924, he joined the Communist Party (KPD). He soon became a member of the Lower Saxony district leadership, where he was responsible for agitation and propaganda and the Rotfrontkämpferbund. In 1926, he became the editor of the Niedersächsischen Arbeiterzeitung, the Lower Saxony workers' newspaper and from 1926 to 1927, he was district treasurer. As editor of the newspaper, between 1926 and 1929, he was convicted of 12 different press violations. In 1929, he went to the Soviet Union for medical reasons, to be cured of a lung condition. On his return, he was active in the educational programs of the KPD.

He was a member of the Versöhnler, a group of KPD members critical of the ultra-left policies of KPD leader Ernst Thälmann and as a result, in 1929, lost his job in the Party, though he was not expelled until 1930. He was unemployed until 1930, when he got a job at a factory and began to build a regional Versöhnler network both in and outside the KPD.

After the Nazi Party seized power in 1933, Wald was forced to go underground. He was able to build a Resistance group called the Committee for Proletarian Unity (Komitee für Proletarische Einheit). Several hundred members strong, its focus was the Hanover area. He kept in close contact with the Versöhnler group organized by Hans Westermann in Hamburg and the Hannover Socialist Workers' Party under Otto Brenner. In 1934, Wald moved to Berlin, where he work to coordination the various Versöhnler groups around Germany. On 11 May 1936 he was arrested by the Gestapo, and on 30 June 1937 he was sentenced at the Volksgerichtshof to 15 years' hard labor. He was imprisoned at Emslandlager and at Brandenburg-Görden Prison with other political prisoners, including Erich Honecker, later head of East Germany's Socialist Unity Party. Wald remained at Brandenburg-Görden until his release in April 1945.

In 1945, Wald again became a KPD party official in Lower Saxony. From 23 August 1946 to 29 October 1946 he was a representative in the State of Hanover legislature established under the British occupation forces. He also was one of those who held the newspaper license, required in postwar Germany, to publish a newspaper in Lower Saxony, the Niedersächsischen Volksstimme. He held this position until 1948, when he withdrew from the Party over the "Russianization of the KPD". In 1948, Wald became the leader of the Confederation of German Trade Unions in Lower Saxony and on the national level. In 1950, he published Feinde der Demokratie ("Enemies of the Democracy") and he became a member of the Social Democratic Party (SPD), working closely with Sigmund Neumann, then head of the eastern office of the SPD.

In 1977, Wald was quoted in Der Spiegel in an article about Honecker's years in Brandenburg-Görden Prison. Wald died in Lachen am Ammersee in 1978.

== Personal ==
Wald was married twice. His son from his first marriage is the German journalist and author Peter Wald. He and his first wife were divorced in 1947. In November 1947, he married Orli Wald. Otto Brenner was his first wife's brother.

== Publications ==
- Arthur Mannbar and Eduard Wald, Brandenburg, Verlag VVN (1948)
- Eduard Wald, Die Gewerkschaften im politischen Zeitgeschehen. Frankfurt am Main (1953)

== Sources ==
- Wilhelm Sommer, Edu Wald und die Widerstandsgruppe „Komitee für proletarische Einheit“ in Hannover – mit einem Text von Peter Wald. In: Hannoversche Geschichtsblätter (Neue Folge), Vol. 57/58, 2003/2004. Hannover (2004) pp. 205–218.
- Barbara Simon, Abgeordnete in Niedersachsen 1946–1994. Biographisches Handbuch. (1996) p. 393
