= Heinrich Schmitt =

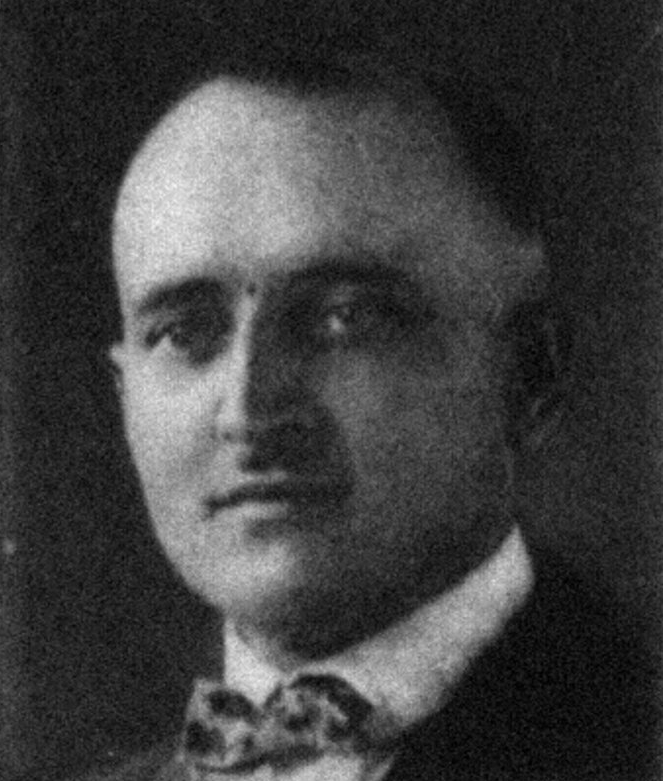
- Schmitt c. 1928

Member of the Reichstag for Merseburg
- In office 20 May 1928 – 14 September 1930
- Preceded by: Multi-member district
- Succeeded by: Multi-member district

Personal details
- Born: 6 October 1895 Waldbüttelbrunn, Lower Franconia, Germany
- Died: 13 August 1951 (aged 55) Munich, Bavaria, West Germany
- Party: SPD, USPD, and KPD
- Spouse: Anna Nawroth (1892–1984)
- Children: Harry Schmitt (1919–1999, also known as Ralf Forster)
- Occupation: Trades union activist & politician

Heinrich Schmitt (6 October 1895 – 13 August 1951) was a German politician. In 1928 he was elected to the national Reichstag, where he sat as a Communist member. In 1933 he escaped with his family to the Soviet Union. The next year he infiltrated back into Germany with false papers. He was arrested in 1935, but survived ten years in detention, re-emerging in 1945 as a leading regional politician in occupied Bavaria. He left the Communist party in 1947.

== Life ==
Heinrich Schmitt was born into a working-class family in Waldbüttelbrunn, a small town a short distance to the west of Würzburg. While his father went out to work his mother maintained a small-holding. Schmitt trained as a machinist and in 1913, the year of his eighteenth birthday, joined the Social Democratic Party (SPD). He was conscripted into the army in 1915, but his military career was cut short by a head wound, and by the end of 1916 he was working for BASF in Ludwigshafen. In 1917 the SPD split, primarily over the issue of whether or not to continue supporting the country's participation in the war, and Schmitt switched to the breakaway Independent Social Democratic Party of Germany (USPD / Unabhängige Sozialdemokratische Partei Deutschlands). 1917 was also the year in which he relocated the Dresden region, obtaining work with the giant Leuna plant. He stayed with Leuna until 1930, joining the company's works council.

The political left splintered further in the chaotic aftermath of World War I, and in 1920 Schmitt joined the newly formed German Communist Party (KPD). By this time he had married Anna Nawroth, and their son Harry Schmitt had been born in Halle on 17 September 1919. As a political activist, Schmitt became known as a skilled and effective speaker. Having joined the works council at Leuna, he became its president in the mid-1920s, and was re-appointed to that post in 1928 and 1929 despite his increasing level of high-level political engagement outside the factory gates. Between 1928 and 1930, he was in the national Reichstag, representing the Merseburg electoral district. The political left continued to be prone to factionalism, and as a member of the increasingly marginalised Conciliator faction within the German Communist Party, in 1930 Schmitt lost his position on the Leuna works council, and also lost his job with Leuna. At the same time, the party withdrew his Reichstag mandate and he lost his seat there. He nevertheless remained loyal to the party, respecting party discipline.

Later in 1930 Schmitt emigrated to the Soviet Union, taking work as a skilled machinist, working initially at the "Hammer & Sickle" plant in Moscow. However, he soon found himself removed from the factory to the Moscow International Lenin School. He returned to Germany in July 1931, where the Party Central Committee installed him as General Secretary of the "Chemicals Industry Workers' International" and as General Secretary of the "International Rubber Industry Workers' Organisation".

Early in 1933 régime change came to Germany and the Hitler government lost little time in imposing a one-party government. Membership of the KPD was banned. Schmitt emigrated with his family back to the Soviet Union, where he resumed his employment as a machinist, while also working voluntarily with the "Chemicals Industry Workers' International".

In June 1934 he was sent to Prague, from where he went on to the Saarland as a Party Central Committee instructor, while his wife Anna and their son Harry remained in the Soviet Union (until after the Second World War). Schmitt traveled in Germany during this time with a false passport, using the name "Walter Scheublein", and was also operating from his Saarland base as a senior consultant to the trade-union movement in the Rhineland. He was also a member of the Berlin-based national leadership team of the illegal trades union movement. On 7 May 1935 Schmitt was arrested in Cologne. Nearly two years of investigative detention followed. On 8 February 1937 he appeared before the Special Court (Volksgerichtshof), created by the government the previous year to handle a wide range of political cases. The court gave him a fifteen-year custodial sentence.

Schmitt was released from Landsberg Prison by the United States Army on 27 April 1945 and reactivated his Communist party membership. On 1 September 1945 he took a job as an inspector with the health insurance administration (Krankenkasse) in Würzburg, a position he held only until 22 October 1945, by which time he joined the Bavarian regional government. During the first week of October the Bavarian chief minister, Wilhelm Hoegner, appointed him Bavarian Secretary of State for Special Projects ("...für Sonderaufgaben"), a newly created post. The creation of the office appears to have resulted from an initiative by the US occupation forces, and responsibilities included "denazification" ("Entnazifizierung "). Between 8 March 1946 and 24 June 1946, he was the sole representative of the Communist Party of Germany on the committee ("Vorbereitender Verfassungsausschuss") convened to prepare a new constitution. Between 30 June 1946 and 26 October 1946, he was a member of the regional assembly that produced the new Bavarian constitution.

"Muß man denn, um ein guter Genosse zu sein, immer unrasiert, ohne Kragen und mit geflicktem Anzug herumlaufen? Das ist jedenfalls nicht mein Ideal."

"Must one always go around unshaven, without a collar, and wearing a patched jacket, in order to be a good Comrade? Either way, that is not my own philosophy."

Heinrich Schmitt, quoted in 1947 at the time of his departure from the Communist Party

During this period Schmitt was also a member of the Communist party secretariat in Bavaria, but he came into conflict with the party, which criticised his ministerial conduct. His lifestyle was deemed "insufficiently comradely". He resigned his ministerial office in July 1946 and his Communist party membership on 19 October 1947. (Other sources imply that he was excluded from the party, but either way, the decision appeared to have been a mutual one.)

Between 1947 and 1949, Schmitt was a member of the Bavarian Senate as a trade union representative. However, this was evidently not a time-consuming responsibility, and during the closing part of the 1940s he also focused on business interests.

Schmitt died in Munich on 13 August 1951.

== Harry Schmitt ==
Heinrich Schmitt's son, Harry Schmitt, known also by his "Nom de Guerre" as Ralf Forster, achieved notability on his own account, although his role was little publicised until after his death in 1999. During the Cold War, Harry Schmitt led the Ralf Forster Group, a secret military organisation sponsored by the East German party leadership which was seen as the military wing of the Communist Party in West Germany.
