= Exempt secretary =

Position in Communist organizations

Exempt secretary (Russian: освобожденный секретарь), also translated as 'freed secretary', 'relieved secretary', 'full-time secretary', etc. was a management position in branches civic organizations in the Soviet Union, notably the Communist Party of the Soviet Union, Komsomol, and Soviet trade unions, established at plants, factories, institutions, etc.

In the Chinese Communist Party, a similar term is 'full-time party secretary', who deals only with party matters and is not involved in "productive" work.

The same concept existed in various parties of Germany: hauptamtlicher Parteisekretär ('full-time party secretary').

== Soviet Union ==
Virtually every workplace (and military force) in the Soviet Union had lower-level subdivisions of the three major Soviet organizations: the CPSU, Komsomol, and Soviet trade unions. Heads of these organizations were titled "secretary". For small organizational subdivisions the secretary was usually an employee of the corresponding workplace subdivisions. For sufficiently large organizational subdivisions, the elected secretary was either temporarily relieved from his workplace duties, or, more frequently, was part of nomenklatura and his salary was paid from the membership dues of the corresponding organization.

Tony Cliff in his 1958 Changes in Stalinist Russia wrote: "In factories of some size, there is a full-time Party secretary appointed by the town, regional, territorial or republican Party Committees, who is responsible not to the management of the plant, but to his superiors in the Party hierarchy." ... "The factory Party secretary has the power to compel the manager to change his decisions, including the annual production plan of the plant or of an individual shop. He can appoint “technical brigades of specialists”, whose suggestions to the manager are irrevocable orders. He can also compel the manager to change his subordinate personnel."

The charter of the CPSU specifies the number of members required in a party organization of a workplace or military unit to have a full-time party secretary.

In 1953 Zbigniew Brzezinski wrote that in Soviet Army full-time party secretaries (i.e., the ones without military duties) were typically assigned in party organizations on regimental and divisional levels and they were nominated by the political departments of the military command one level above. (There were two structures of political control over the Soviet armed forces: immediate control via the structures of the Main Political Directorate of the Soviet Army and Soviet Navy (best known by the concepts of politruk and zampolit) and mediated via the local organizations of the CPSU within the Army. The two were intertwined: Political Directorate itself was controlled by the Communist Party. At the same time, the Political Directorate had some control over Communist organizations down the military hierarchy.
