= Wittorf affair =

Political scandal in the KPD

The Wittorf affair (German: Wittorf-Affäre) was a political scandal that occurred in the Communist Party of Germany (KPD) during the Weimar Republic in 1928. Chairman Ernst Thälmann was ousted from the KPD Central Committee when his close friend John Wittorf had embezzled from a party campaign fund and Thälmann tried to cover up the embezzlement. Joseph Stalin had Thälmann reinstated as KPD Chairman using the influence of Comintern, completing the Stalinization of the KPD and beginning a purge of moderates from the party.

== Scandal ==
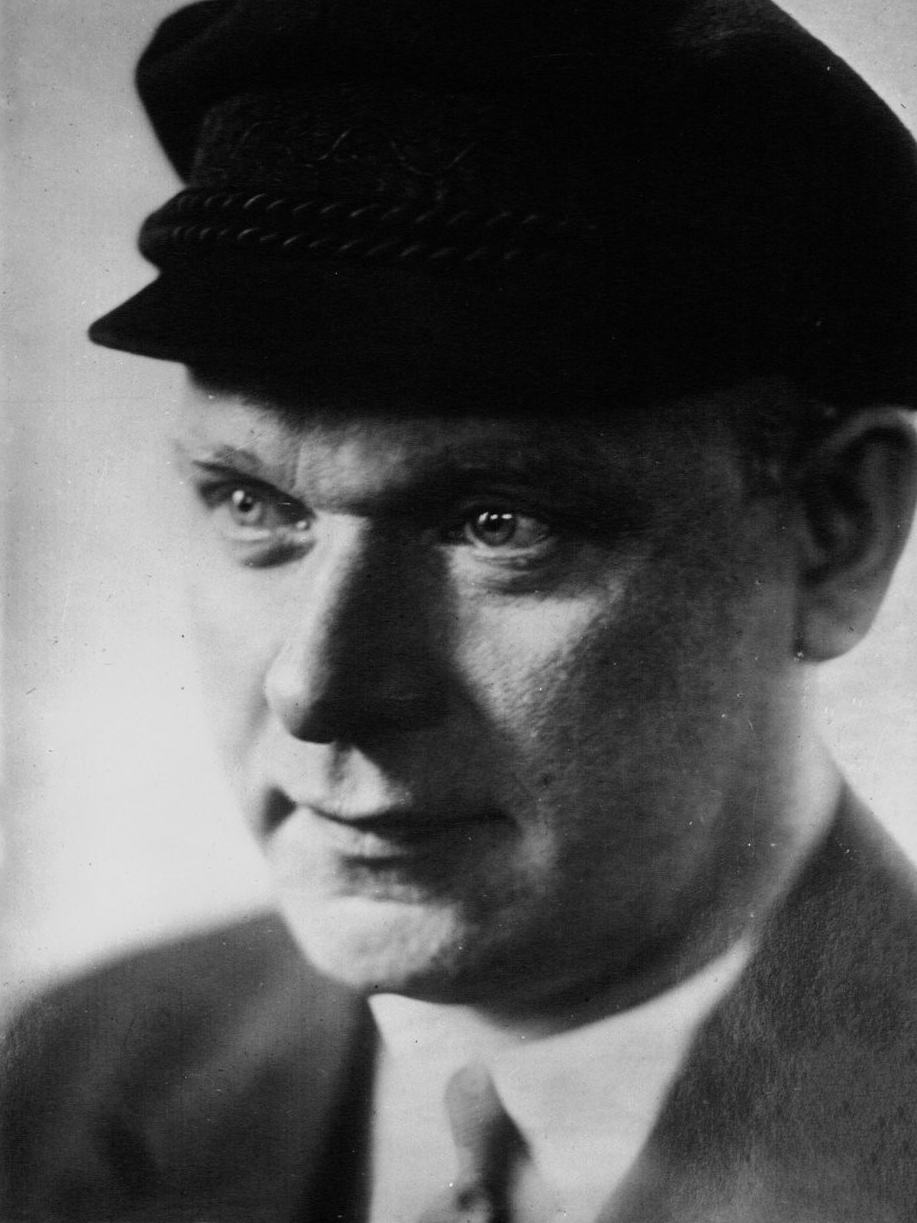
Ernst Thälmann

John Friedrich Wittorf (1894–1981), a member of the KPD's central committee, was caught having embezzled around 1,500 to 3,000 Reichsmarks from the KPD's campaign fund during the 1928 German federal election. KPD chairman Ernst Thälmann, who was a close friend and sponsor of Wittorf, knew about the embezzlement but, due to the upcoming election, concealed it for tactical reasons. At first, responsibility was blamed on Hugo Dehmel, a district treasurer not involved in the embezzlement. On 26 September 1928, after rumors of the embezzlement had been leaked to the press, the KPD central committee expelled Wittorf and three other Hamburg officials from the KPD. Thälmann was accused of covering up Wittorf's actions and relieved of his party responsibilities during a party investigation, effectively removing him as KPD Chairman. Only two of the central committee's 35 members, Leo Flieg and Josef Winternitz, defended him.

== Stalin's intervention ==
Joseph Stalin, the leader of the Soviet Union, used his influence in the communist world to have Thälmann reinstated as KPD Chairman despite the scandal. Stalin had been looking to strengthen Thälmann, whom he viewed as an ally and loyal supporter for the left turn recently adopted at the Sixth World Congress of the Comintern. Stalin felt he could count on Thälmann to purge the KPD of both its right and moderate left wings. Stalin asked Vyacheslav Molotov for advice in handling the problem of Thälmann's ouster. In a telegraph to Molotov on 1 October 1928, Stalin acknowledged that Thälmann had made a huge mistake in covering up the embezzlement, but defended his motives, calling them "unselfish". He said Thälmann had been trying to spare the party a scandal, in contrast to the motives of Arthur Ewert and Gerhart Eisler, KPD central committee members who were in the Conciliator faction. Stalin felt they had placed their own interests over those of the party and the Comintern and saw in their actions "absolutely no mitigating circumstances".

Stalin then intervened: On 6 October 1928, the Executive Committee of the Comintern passed a resolution expressing "complete political trust" in Thälmann, reversing the KPD's 26 September decision and calling on the KPD to "liquidate all factions within the party". Despite stubborn resistance from several prominent officials, the central committee of the KPD reinstated Thälmann as party chairman on 20 October 1928. This signaled the beginning of the KPD's purge of its right-wing and the moderate Conciliator faction.

== Aftermath ==
The Wittorf affair was the final step of the Stalinization of the KPD. It made Thälmann servile with respect to Stalin, pinned the KPD to the general line of the Soviet All-Union Communist Party (Bolsheviks), and destroyed internal democracy within the KPD. It guaranteed Thälmann's and the KPD's commitment to branding the Social Democratic Party of Germany (with whom the KPD was often a reluctant ally) as ;social fascists;. Stalin used the affair to consolidate his control, via the Comintern, of foreign Comintern mamber parties; he showed his support for loyalty and ambition, and neutralized both real and perceived political opponents. The discussion in the Comintern over the ousting of Thälmann had wide-reaching consequences for other Communist Parties, including the Communist Party of Italy.

== Rediscovered after the Soviet Union's collapse ==
Following the establishment of the German Democratic Republic in 1949, Thälmann was treated as a founding father despite the fact that he had been executed at the Nazi concentration camp at Buchenwald in 1944. The Wittorf affair was distorted beyond recognition or simply not discussed in the German Democratic Republic. After the dissolution of the Soviet Union in 1991, the archives of the Comintern and the central committee of the Communist Party became available to Western historians, revealing much about the Wittorf affair and the extent to which Stalin manipulated the Comintern and the KPD.
