= Osip Piatnitsky =

Russian revolutionary and politician (1882–1938)

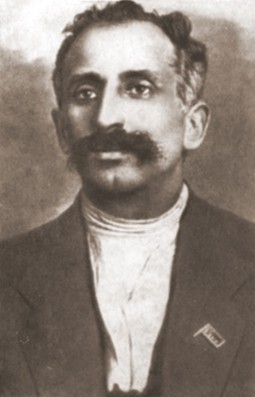
- Osip Piatnitsky before 1926
- Born: Iosif Oriolovich Tarshis; January 29, 1882; Vilkomir, Russian Empire
- Died: July 29, 1938 (aged 56); Moscow, Soviet Union
- Cause of death: Execution by firing squad
- Resting place: Kommunarka shooting ground
- Political party: Russian Social Democratic Labor Party (1899–1917); All-Union Communist Party (Bolsheviks) (1917–1938)

Osip Aaronovitch Piatnitsky (Russian: Осип Аронович Пятницкий; Lithuanian: Josifas Piatnickis; born Iosif Oriolovich Tarshis; 29 January [O.S. 17 January] 1882 – 29 July 1938) was a Russian revolutionary and Soviet politician. Piatnitsky is best remembered as head of the International Department of the Communist International during the 1920s and early 1930s, a position which made him one of the leading public faces of the international communist movement.

== Biography ==
=== Early years ===
Iosif Oriolovich Tarshis was born on 29 January [O.S. 17 January] 1882, the son of a Jewish carpenter in the town of Ukmergė (then known as Vilkomir), in the Kovno Governorate of the Russian Empire (present-day Lithuania). As a boy, Tarshis worked briefly as a tailor's apprentice in Vilkomir before moving to the big city of Kovno (now Kaunas) in 1897. There he took up his father's trade of carpentry and was radicalized by the illegal trade union movement among the city's carpenters, joining a workers' self-education circle. In 1898, Tarshis became active in the Kovno's illegal tailor's union, helping to conduct educational and organizational work on its behalf.

=== Underground revolutionary ===
Tarshis became a convert to Marxism and joined the Russian Social Democratic Labor Party (RSDLP) in 1899, moving that same year to Lithuania's largest city, Vilna (now Vilnius). There Tashis became involved in the Vilna organization of ladies' tailors. As a member of the underground movement, Tarshis adopted the pseudonym Piatnitsa, meaning "Friday", as a means of avoiding detection by the Okhrana, the tsar's secret police. This early "party name" became the root of Tarshis's best-known pseudonym, Osip Piatnitsky, and it is by this name that he will henceforth be referred to here.

In 1901, Piatnitsky became associated with the Internationalist wing of the RSDLP, a group prominently including Vladimir Ulyanov (Lenin), which was at the time publishing the revolutionary newspaper Iskra from emigration in Germany. Piatnitsky became involved in the smuggling of this newspaper across the German frontier into Russia, also helping to organize the transportation of party members to and from the country. This dangerous work placed Piatnitsky in harm's way, and arrest by the secret police followed in 1902.

Although jailed in 1902, Piatnitsky managed to make his escape and he returned to Germany to continue his work as a courier for the Iskra group. He was a delegate to the 2nd Congress of the RSDLP in London in the Summer of 1903 — a gathering which split the RSDLP into rival Bolshevik and Menshevik wings. Piatnitsky sided with Lenin and the Bolsheviks at that gathering and he remained a loyal member of that faction throughout the pre-revolutionary years.

In the spring of 1905, Piatnitsky attended the 3rd Congress of the RSDLP in London. He returned to the Russian Empire later in that same year, going to Odessa in Ukraine, where he worked as a Bolshevik organizer primarily among the tobacco workers there. Piatnitsky was an active participant in the Revolution of 1905, helping to organize a general strike in Odessa. Unsurprisingly, this activity again drew the scrutiny of the secret police and in January 1906 Piatnitsky was arrested again by the Okhrana.

Following this second arrest, Piatnitsky remained in jail until 1908. Following his release, Piatnitsky returned to Germany, where he once again took up work for the Bolshevik Party, coordinating secret communications from the party center abroad to its network of activists inside Russia.

In January 1912, Piatnitsky was again chosen as a delegate to a Bolshevik conclave in Prague, remembered as the 6th All-Russian Conference of the RSDLP. As he sought to return to Russia to work in industry, Piatnitsky went to Paris following the Prague party conference, where he trained as an electrician.

He returned to Russia in 1913, taking a job as an electrician in the town of Volsk in Saratov Oblast, located on the banks of the Volga River. There Piatnitsky led a strike before being transferred to Samara. His political and union activities drew the attention of the secret police and Piatnitsky was arrested for a third time in June 1914. This time Piatnitsky was sentenced to Siberian exile, which removed him from revolutionary politics until after the February Revolution of 1917.

=== Communist functionary ===
Freed by the February Revolution, Piatnitsky relocated to Moscow, where he became a member of the Bolshevik Party's Moscow Committee. Following the Bolshevik Revolution of November 1917, Piatnitsky became a government functionary. From 1919 to 1920, he served as head of the Railroad Workers' Trade Union. Piatnitsky was chosen as head of the Moscow Committee in 1920, and elected an alternate member of the governing Central Committee of the Russian Communist Party (bolsheviks) at the party's 9th Congress that same spring.

Piatnitsky moved from work in the Soviet trade unions and the Russian Communist Party to work in the Communist International in 1921, when he was elected by Executive Committee of the Communist International to the post of treasurer of the Comintern and head of the Comintern's International Liaison Department (OMS). Following the 4th World Congress of the Comintern in November 1922, Piatnitsky was chosen as a member of the Comintern's Organization Buro and budget commission. In June 1923, the 3rd Plenum of the Comintern elected Piatnitsky as of four top leaders of the organization to sit on the body's governing Secretariat. Piatnitsky was joined as a member of the Comintern Secretariat by the Bulgarian Vasil Kolarov, the Finn Otto Kuusinen, and Mátyás Rákosi of Hungary.

Piatnitsky remained a top official of the Comintern throughout the 1920s and the first half of the 1930s. The 5th World Congress of 1924 returned him as a member of the Secretariat, Orgburo, budget commission, and ECCI. Following the fall of Grigory Zinoviev in 1926, the post he formerly held as "President" of the Comintern was eliminated, to be replaced by a new Political Secretariat, to which Piatnitsky was elected. Piatnitsky's role was subsequently confirmed by the 6th World Congress of 1928 and the 11th Plenum of 1931.

In addition to his leading role in the Comintern, Piatnitsky held several positions of high importance in the hierarchy of the Russian Communist Party. In 1924, he was elected a member of the Communist Party's Central Control Committee, a body in charge of matters of party discipline, remaining in that position through 1927. In that year, Piatnitsky was made a full member of the governing Central Committee of the RKP(b) in which he continued until the time of his arrest in 1937.

Piatnitsky seems to have fallen from grace towards the middle of the 1930s. While he addressed the 7th World Congress in 1935, he was not re-elected to any of the positions in the organization which he had held previously. Thereafter he returned briefly to work in the All-Union Communist Party (bolsheviks).

=== Arrest and execution ===
In the midst of the secret police terror known as the Great Purge, Osip Piatnitsky objected to the massacres, expressed doubt that charges against party comrades were valid when the Central Committee met in plenary session and was asked to sanction what had been happening. Equal to calling Stalin a tyrant and fraudster, Piatnitsky refused to back down. As a result, in October 1937, like what happened to his comrade Grigory Kaminsky and others a few months earlier, he was removed from his position on the Central Committee, stripped of party membership, and arrested by the NKVD, the Soviet secret police. This suicidal act of courage was extremely rare. He remained in jail for a year before finally being given a summary trial and sentenced to death. On 30 October 1938, Osip Piatnitsky was executed. He was 56 years old at the time of his death.

=== Legacy ===
Osip Piatnitsky was posthumously rehabilitated in 1956, following the 20th Congress of the CPSU, at which Soviet leader Nikita Khrushchev revealed the systemic abuses of the Soviet secret police during the Stalin period in a so-called "Secret Speech."

== Works ==
- The Organisation of a World Party. London: Communist Party of Great Britain, 1928.
- The Immediate Tasks of the International Trade Union Movement. New York: Workers Library Publishers, n.d. [c. 1930].
- World Communists in Action: The Consolidation of the Communist Parties and Why the Growing Political Influence of the Sections of the Comintern is Not Sufficiently Maintained. New York: Workers Library Publishers, n.d. [c. 1930].
- Unemployment and the Tasks of the Communists. New York: Workers Library Publishers, 1931.
- Urgent Questions of the Day: Unemployed Movement, Factory Organisation, Fluctuation of Membership. Moscow: Cooperative Publishing Society of Foreign Workers in the USSR, 1931.
- The Bolshevisation of the Communist Parties by Eradicating the Social-Democratic Traditions. London: Modern Books, n.d. [1932].
- The World Economic Crisis: The Revolutionary Upsurge and the Tasks of the Communist Parties. New York: Workers Library Publishers, n.d. [1932].
- The Work of the Communist Parties of France and Germany and the Tasks of the Communists in the Trade Union Movement. New York: Workers Library Publishers, n.d. [c. 1932].
- The Present Situation in Germany. New York: Workers Library Publishers, 1933.
- The Twenty-One Conditions of Admission into the Communist International. New York: Workers Library Publishers, 1934.
- The Communists in the Fight for the Masses. New York: Workers Library Publishers, 1934.
- Memoirs of a Bolshevik. New York: International Publishers, 1935.
