= Alexander Abramov-Mirov =

Soviet politician (1895–1937)

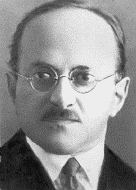
- Born: Alexander Lasarevich Abramov; Александр Лазаревич Абрамов; 19 October 1895; Šiauliai, Kovno Governorate, Russian Empire
- Died: 26 November 1937 (aged 42); Moscow, Soviet Union
- Cause of death: Execution by firing squad
- Occupations: Communications officer (Comintern); Intelligence official
- Spouse: Elena Germanovna Mirova (1899–1938)

Alexander Abramov-Mirov (19 October 1895 – 26 November 1937) was a Soviet Comintern communications officer and intelligence agent. Believed by those in charge to be insufficiently distanced from Leon Trotsky, with whom he had worked closely in the past, he was shot to death on 26 November 1937, the day after he was convicted. His wife suffered the same fate on 8 February 1938.

== Names ==
His first name is sometimes given as Jakob, possibly reflecting a career in espionage and the resulting necessity to use more than one name.

== Life ==
Alexander Lasarevich Abramov was born in Šiauliai, an industrial and commercial city in Lithuania, which at that time of his birth had already been incorporated within the Russian Empire for approximately a century. His father was a Jewish merchant. He was educated in Germany. As a child he was strongly influenced by his elder brothers who were members of the Jewish Labour Union. However, it was a different left-wing movement that he himself joined in 1916, becoming a member of the Russian Social Democratic Labour Party and, within it, the Bolshevik faction. The next year he took part in the February Revolution and in the longer lasting October Revolution of 1917.

In 1921 he took part in the Polish–Soviet War: at the direction of one of the Bolshevik leaders, Leon Trotsky, from 1920 Abramov was organising the Soviets' so-called "German brigade" on the western front. The next year he embarked on a diplomatic career, appointed Second Secretary at the Soviet embassy in Berlin, with responsibilities in the press department. The reality of his responsibilities, not entirely reflected in his official title, was his work as a key official of the Executive Committee of the Communist International (ECCI / ИККИ), the controlling authority of the Communist International (Comintern). He was in charge of the Berlin information hub of the International Liaison Department (Отдел международной связи / ОМС / OMS), which focused on collecting and collating foreign intelligence from across central Europe. He was responsible for the transfers and distribution of Comintern funds and instructions, as well as for the printing of documents. Including assistants and couriers, during his time in Berlin he controlled a staff of 25.

It appears to have been in 1926 that he relocated and took over leadership of the OMS at its Moscow headquarters, in succession to Osip Piatnitsky (who nevertheless continued to play a leading role in the Intelligence department of the ECCI). Abramov remained in this post for nearly ten years, personally responsible for a wide range of "technical" espionage and communications tasks in the Comintern. Contemporaries later remembered him as a friendly, competent, and loyal comrade.

After the seventh Comintern World Congress which took place in 1935, Abramov was increasingly edged out of positions of influence within the ECCI. In September 1936 he was transferred to the Intelligence Section of the Red Army, where he took the title "Assistant Chief of the 4th Intelligence General Staff Control", which involved leadership of Soviet military intelligence in the Spanish Civil War, an unfolding situation in which the Soviet leadership took a close and active interest.

In the end, like most OMS workers, he became a victim of the Great Terror/Purge. He was arrested on 21 May 1937 by the NKVD, which imputed to him a central role in the (almost certainly fictitious) "Anti-Comintern Block", which was said to have destroyed the Comintern from the inside. Among the various accusations, it was said that he had used the OMS to channel money to Trotsky, who had fallen foul of Stalin some years earlier but was, at this stage, still alive and living in exile while trying to hide from Soviet agents. During his interrogation, Abramov was probably badly tortured, since like many others similarly treated in this purge, he signed a "confession" which imputed guilt to his former co-workers. It was also recorded that he had implicated his former boss, Osip Piatnitsky. On 25 November 1937 it was determined by the Military Collegium of the Supreme Court of the Soviet Union that he had led the Trotskyist terror organisation within the Comintern, and also worked for the German Intelligence services. The death sentence was carried out by shooting the next day, on 26 November 1937. The same court rehabilitated him on 18 January 1958.

== Family ==
Alexander Lasarevich married Elena Germanovna Mirova (born Saratov, 1899). During the Spanish Civil War, she worked as a correspondent in Spain for the Russian News Agency (TASS). She was shot on 8 February 1938, like her husband a victim of the Great Terror/Purge.
