= Arthur Ewert =

German communist political activist (1890–1959)

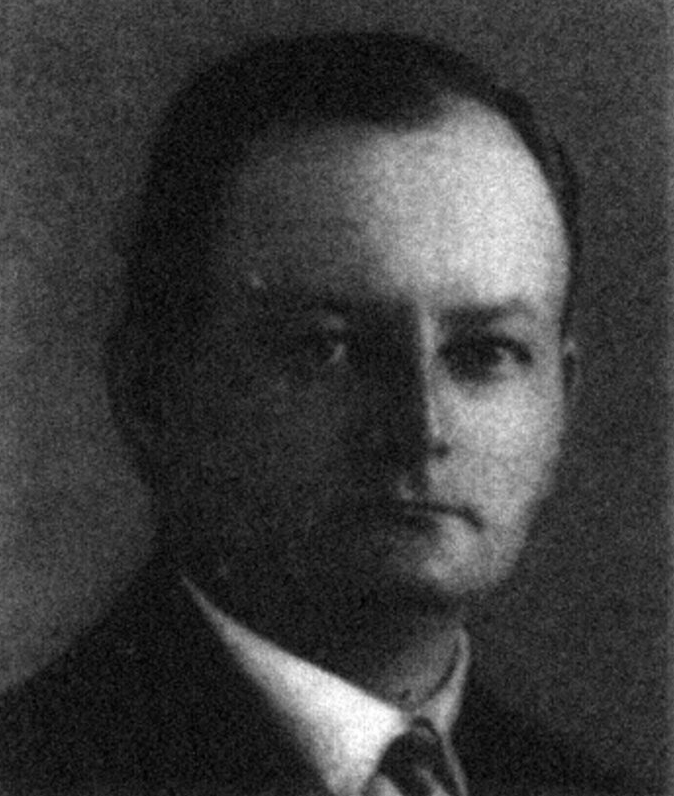
- Ewert c. 1928

Member of the Reichstag for Potsdam II
- In office 20 May 1928 – 14 September 1930
- Preceded by: Multi-member district
- Succeeded by: Multi-member district

Personal details
- Born: 13 November 1890 Heinrichswalde, East Prussia, Kingdom of Prussia, German Empire
- Died: 3 July 1959 (aged 68) Eberswalde, East Germany
- Spouse: Elise Saborovsky (m. 1922; died 1940)
- Known for: Political activism
- Central institution membership: 1925–1929: Full member, KPD Politburo; 1927–1929: Full member, KPD Central Committee; 1923–1924: Full member, KPD Zentrale

Arthur Ernest Ewert (13 November 1890 – 3 July 1959) was a German communist political activist and functionary of the Communist International (Comintern). Ewert is best remembered as an official Comintern representative to the United States, China, Argentina, and Brazil during the late 1920s and 1930s. After being subjected to torture and sentenced to 13 years in prison for his political activity in Brazil, Ewert lost his sanity. He was granted amnesty in May 1945 and ultimately returned to East Germany, where he lived out the rest of his life in a series of medical facilities.

== Early life and education ==
Arthur Ernest Ewert was born November 13, 1890, in the town of Heinrichswalde, East Prussia (now called Slavsk). He was the son of a poor peasant family. Largely self-educated, Ewert completed only a primary school education in a one-room rural schoolhouse.

Anxious to escape the drudgery of rural life, at the age of 14 Ewert accepted a position as an apprentice in an uncle's saddle-making factory in the urban center of Berlin. The growth of the automotive industry convinced the young Ewert that there was little future in saddle-making, however, so he left that trade to take a job as a worker in a Berlin steel works. Earning low wages to perform difficult and sometimes dangerous work in the steel plant proved to be a radicalizing experience for Ewert. Influenced by his older sister, Minna, who was an activist in the social democratic youth movement, Ewert himself joined the Social Democratic Party of Germany (SPD) in 1908 at the age of 18.

In addition to socialist politics, Ewert's sister introduced him to a friend from work, the Polish-born Elise Saborovsky Ewert, known to her friends as "Szabo", who was herself a committed Marxist. The pair began living together and would remain a couple for 25 years.

== Pre-political life ==
=== Life in Canada ===
Early in 1914 Ewert and Szabowski moved to Canada, where they began to achieve fluency in the English language. At the time of Canada's entry into World War I in the summer of that year Ewert and Szabowski were required as citizens of an enemy power to report to the legal authorities for internment for the duration of the war. Instead the couple chose to disappear into the political underground, where they were aided by Canadian Marxist opponents of the war. The couple traveled extensively through Canada and the United States in this period, interacting with others of like political mind and joining the new Socialist Party of North America (SPNA), a small revolutionary socialist organization launched in Canada in 1915. During this period the couple used the party pseudonyms "Gustav" and "Elsie" and procured false identity documents under the names "Arthur Brown" and "Annie Bancourt" to better avoid law enforcement officers.

Following the Russian Revolution of November 1917, Canadian authorities increased their scrutiny of domestic radicals and Ewert and Szabowski became persons of interest. An informer tipped off the authorities that the pair would be in Toronto for a party meeting on March 23, 1919, and plainclothes detectives picked up their trail from the gathering to a boarding house, where arrest and search warrants were served. According to the police communist propaganda and several handguns were found in the couple's room during the search. After an administrative hearing Ewert was deported to Germany a few months after his arrest, while Szabo was transported across Canada to an internment camp, pending her own deportation in February 1920 aboard a prisoner of war repatriation ship. The couple reunited in Berlin where they resumed their lives together anew.

=== German revolutionary ===
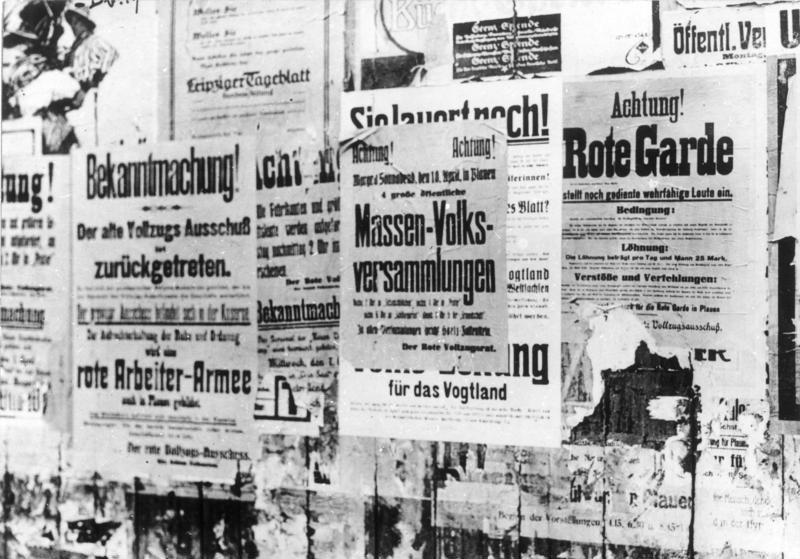
Wall posters from the ill-fated "March Action" of 1921, which resulted in defeat and discredit for the Communist Party of Germany.

Returning to Germany early in the summer of 1919, Ewert joined the fledgling Communist Party of Germany (KPD) and became active in its work preparing the ground for a revolutionary overthrow of the German government. To support himself he went to work in Berlin as a laborer at the giant electrical corporation AEG (Allgemeine Elektricitäts-Gesellschaft), becoming one of the leading KPD activists among that company's workers. This period was marked by economic chaos, strikes, and street fighting, in which the KPD frequently played the role of provocateur. Ewert was involved in this activity as a leading member of the loosely organized Greater Berlin Revolutionary Action Committee, established to organize urban workers into fighting groups to do battle with similar bands of ultranationalist demobilized soldiers.

The leadership of Soviet Russia placed supreme importance on an early communist revolution in Germany to provide material support for the revolution in their own revolution backwards peasant nation. Substantial funds were funneled into Germany to support the organizing and propaganda efforts of the German communist movement. From 1920 onwards German-speaking veterans of the Soviet revolution and Russian Civil War were employed to establish paramilitary "military-political organizations" throughout Germany in preparation for armed insurrection.

The leadership of the KPD was divided over the advisability of such preparations for armed struggle, with Hungarian Comintern plenipotentiaries Bela Kun and József Pogány dispatched to Germany early in 1921 in an effort to win support for the strategy from faltering party chiefs. These preparations for a planned insurrection were ultimately short-circuited by events in Soviet Russia, including the March 1 Kronstadt uprising in which Baltic sailors took up arms against the Soviet regime, prompting more than two weeks of violent and bloody conflict between these revolutionary forces.

In need of a diversion, the Communist International (Comintern) pushed forward with its plans for German insurrection in events which were later to be known as the March Action. On March 22, 1921, Communist paramilitary units exploded bombs and attacked police stations and government buildings throughout Central Germany in an attempt to spark the overthrow of the Ebert government. The chaos and killing which resulted from this coordinated offensive resulted in a debacle for the Communists, alienating a broad section of the public against the KPD and provoking an immediate reaction by the authorities, which easily put down the uprising. The Communist Party of Germany was decimated in the aftermath of the failed March Action and party leader Paul Levi was expelled for afterwards publishing a pamphlet which sharply criticized the Comintern for its tactics and role.

In April 1921 the KPD leadership dispatched Arthur Ewert to the city of Halle to attempt to rebuild the party organization there following its destruction in the March Action. After only a couple weeks Ewert was arrested for his organizing activity, however, and he was transferred to the prison facility at Frankfurt, where he was held for two months with other communist activists without formal charges being filed. The state was unable to produce evidence that Ewert was involved in fomenting armed insurrection, however, and he was subsequently released.

== Political career ==
=== Political rise ===
Ewert was elected to the governing National Committee (Zentrale) and its Politburo by the 8th Congress of the KPD in January 1923. Ewert was also elected as a KPD delegate to the 3rd Enlarged Plenum of Executive Committee of the Communist International (ECCI) in 1923.

During this interval Ewert was one of the top party leaders in Western Germany involved in the planning of the Communist Party's failed October 1923 uprising. This activity made Ewert a wanted man with the legal authorities of the Weimar Republic and he was forced into hiding. Ewert was arrested in November 1926 but managed to escape and he returned to life in the underground until 1928.

Ewert was voted off the Zentrale for factional reasons by the dominant party left wing at 9th Congress of the KPD, held in April 1924. Ewert and his co-thinkers Heinz Neumann and Gerhart Eisler were removed from the political scene for work in the Communist International in Moscow. Ewert was initially assigned to work in the Comintern's Balkan Commission, dealing with political affairs of the various Communist Parties of that region. Ewert was also put to work as a lecturer at the Comintern's International Lenin School, an institution established in 1925 for the intellectual and technical training of leading party cadres for life as "professional revolutionaries."

The fortunes of his "center" political faction soon improved in Germany, however, and Ewert was returned to his formerly held leading positions by the 10th Congress of the KPD in 1925 and re-elected by the 11th Congress in 1927.

In 1926, Ewert was again selected as a delegate of the KPD to the 6th Enlarged Plenum of ECCI, at which he made use of his English-language skills as chair of the British Commission under the pseudonym "Braun."

Ewert was again elected to the 8th Enlarged Plenum of ECCI, held in Moscow in May 1927, where he chaired the American Commission, which attempted to resolve the ongoing factional war inside the Workers (Communist) Party of America. This was followed that same summer by his dispatch to the United States as the Comintern's Representative to the 5th Convention of the Workers (Communist) Party, during which time he used the pseudonym "Grey."

By 1928, Ewert was regarded as one of the top leaders of the KPD, reckoned by historian Patrick Major to have been the number two figure in the Communist Party of Germany after party leader Ernst Thälmann. He entered the German parliament, the Reichstag, in May 1928. Later in 1928 Ewert was tapped as the KPD's representative to the Executive Committee of the Communist International following Thälmann's apparent involvement in a corruption scandal.

=== Condemnation as "Conciliator" ===
Ewert returned from his Moscow posting to ECCI early in 1929 to resume work in the apparatus of the German Communist Party. He quickly found himself on the wrong side of a growing factional divide of the increasingly radical Third Period policies of the world communist movement as a leading member of the moderate "Conciliator" (Versöhnler) faction.

At the 10th Enlarged Plenum of ECCI, held in Moscow in 1929, Ewert came under fire from his factional opponents as a supporter of discredited Soviet leader Nikolai Bukharin, with KPD representative to ECCI Walter Ulbricht leading the attack of what he characterized as a "Bukharin–Humbert-Droz–Ewert Group." This charge was echoed by Joseph Stalin's right-hand man, Vyacheslav Molotov, who singled out Ewert by name among those "conciliators" who lent de facto political support to the more moderate political line of Bukharin and his co-thinkers inside the All-Union Communist Party (bolsheviks).

Ewert managed to salvage his political career by engaging in public self-criticism at the 12th Congress of the KPD, held in June 1929, followed by publication of an article entitled "The Bankruptcy of the Conciliators" in the official party newspaper. Despite this public reversal of previously held political positions, Ewert was removed from the top leadership of the German Communist Party and was thereafter no longer directly involved in German party affairs.

=== Comintern functionary ===
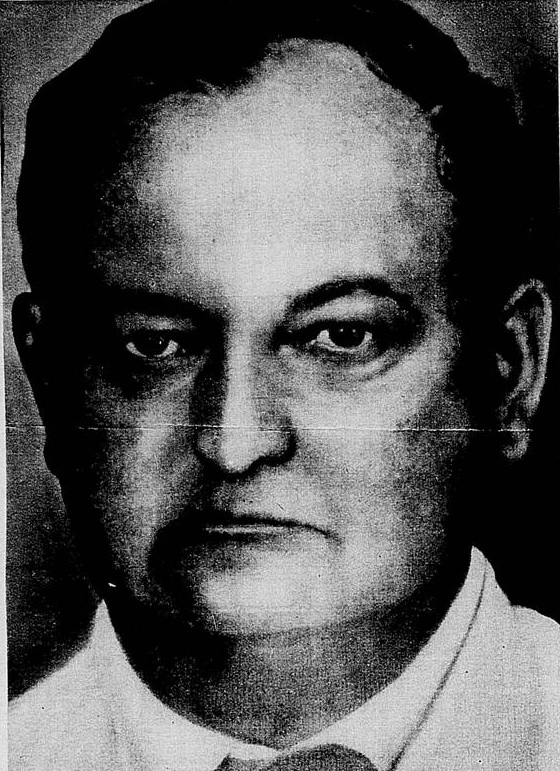
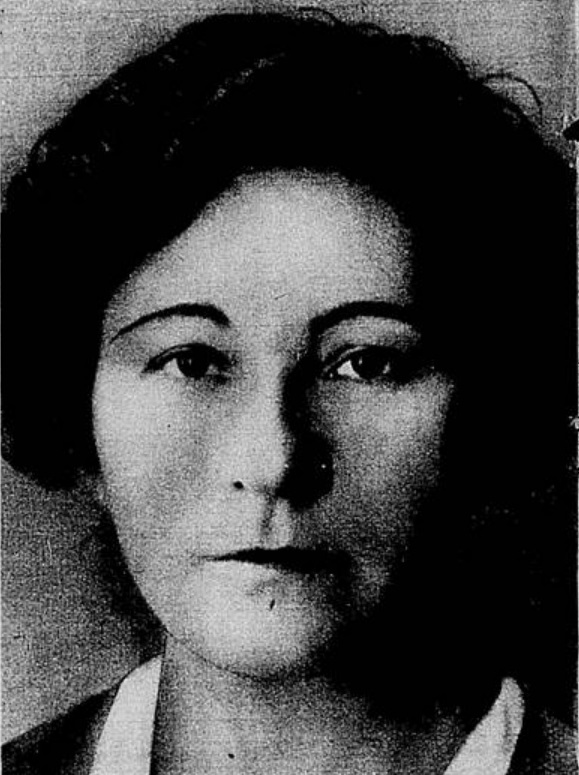
Ewert and his partner Elise in 1936

Ewert's familiarity with the English language and with the affairs of the America Communist Party made him a useful agent to the US, to which he traveled a false passport on Comintern business in 1930. Of primary concern to the Comintern was obtaining an independent assessment of the solidity of the hold over the party apparatus by the faction headed by Earl Browder and William Z. Foster, which had recently assumed control from deposed party leader Jay Lovestone.

The use of Ewert — a personal friend and former ideological ally of the expelled dissident Lovestone — for this task was doubtlessly a form of loyalty-testing and assessment of whether Ewert retained political usefulness to the Comintern. Ewert seems to have passed the test, avoiding contacts with the Lovestone political organization and gaining the confidence and respect of the new American party leadership.

In the fall of 1930, Ewert was formally assigned to the Comintern's Latin American department and he traveled with his common-law wife Szabo to Buenos Aires, Argentina to take over affairs of the Comintern office there. The posting was not a desirable one, but was rather a form of banishment of the ideologically suspect Ewert from the decision-making centers of the Communist Party of Germany and the Comintern.

Ewert worked closely with Comintern representative August Guralsky to win popular expelled Brazilian political leader Luís Carlos Prestes to the communist cause, regarded as a top priority task. The pair were successful in formally bringing Prestes over to the Communist Party of Brazil (PCB) by May 1931, with Prestes capping his conversion with a trip to Moscow that fall.

It is unclear whether Ewert accompanied Prestes to the Soviet Union, but he did turn up again in Moscow in the spring of 1931, his Argentine mission at an end.

In 1932, Ewert and his wife were dispatched as Comintern representatives to the Chinese Communist Party, where they would stay until recalled to Moscow in 1934.

From Moscow Ewert and Szabo were first sent to the United States, with Ewert using the pseudonym "Harry Berger" during his brief stay. From there the pair proceeded to Brazil as Comintern Representative to the Communist Party of Brazil. Following an abortive insurrection against the regime of Getúlio Vargas in November 1935, Ewert was arrested in Rio de Janeiro and was subjected to severe torture by authorities seeking the whereabouts of opposition leader Prestes.

His wife Szabo was also subjected to police torture, being stripped, forced to suffer electric shocks, beaten, and burned with cigarettes — all in the presence of Ewert. Despite the viciousness of the interrogation, neither Ewert nor Szabo betrayed their confidences under duress. Szabo was ultimately deported to Nazi Germany in September 1936, where she was incarcerated and would later die at the Ravensbrück concentration camp in 1939.

Ewert underwent protracted interrogation, during which time he lost his sanity. He was finally brought to trial in May 1937, where he was convicted and sentenced to 13 years and four months in prison.

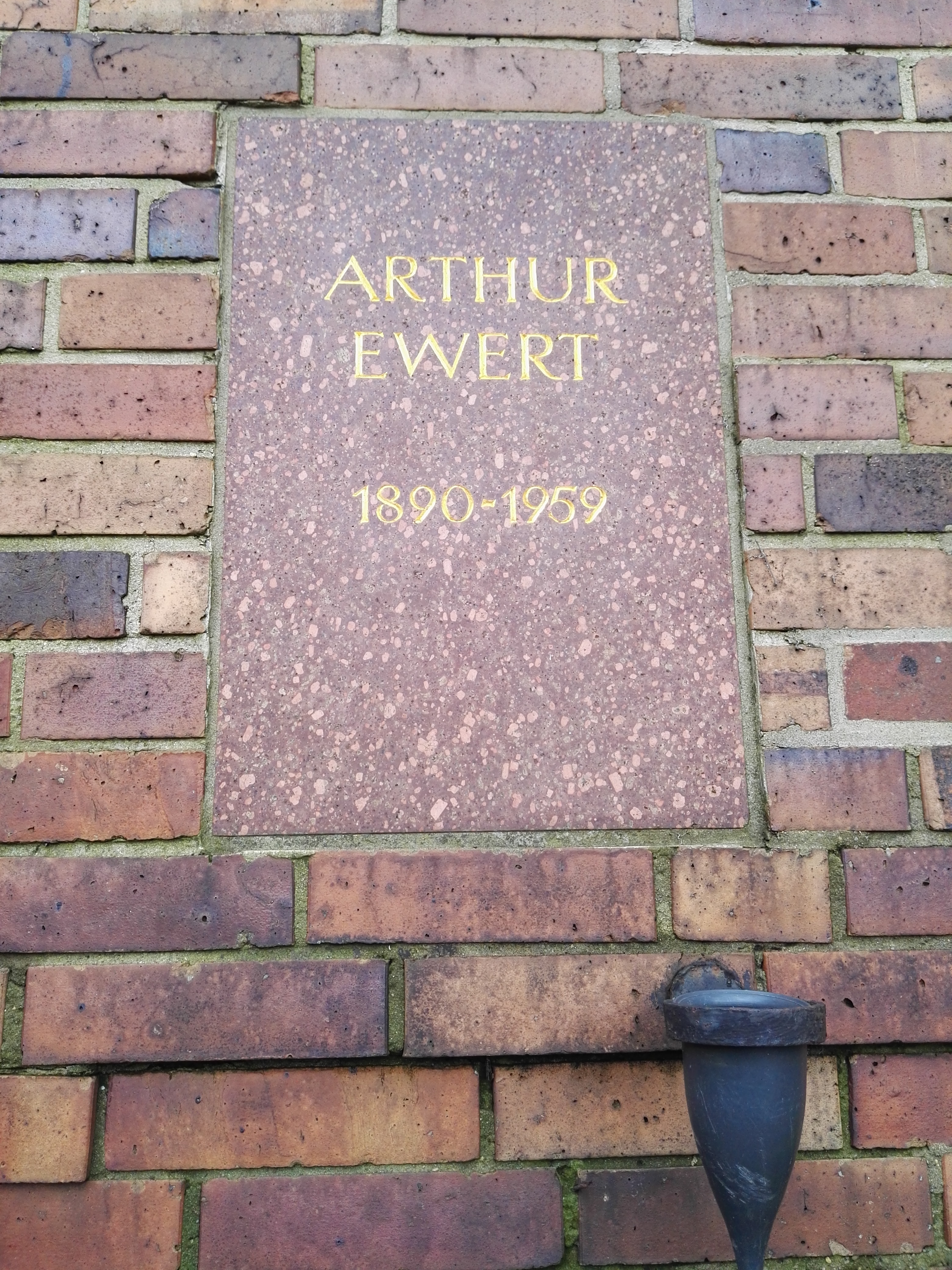
Ewert's grave in the Zentralfriedhof Friedrichsfelde cemetery

== Later years and death ==
In May 1945, Ewert was granted an amnesty from prison. He returned by ship to the Soviet zone of control in East Germany in August 1947 but the mental problems which followed his torture and imprisonment proved insurmountable and he was forced to be hospitalized in a sanatorium for the rest of his life.

Ewert died on July 3, 1959, in Eberswalde, East Germany.

In 1981 the government of the German Democratic Republic issued a postage stamp in Ewert's honor.
