= 3rd World Congress of the Communist International =

1921 meeting in Moscow, Russia

- Begins: June 22, 1921
- Ends: July 12, 1921
- Location: Moscow
- Country: Russian Soviet Federative Socialist Republic
- Previous event: 2nd Congress
- Next event: 4th Congress

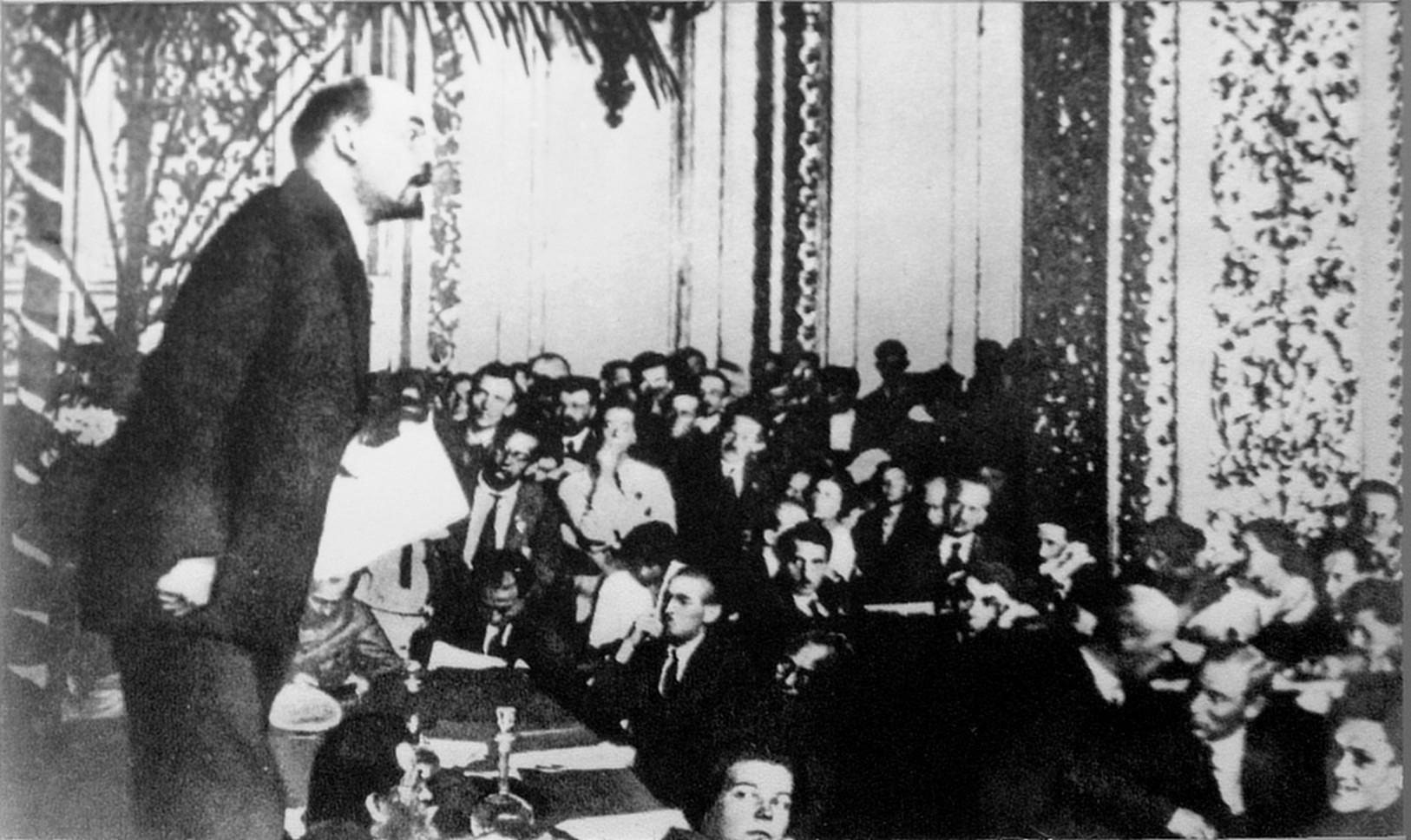
Lenin giving a speech to the delegates of the Third World Congress of the Communist International

The 3rd World Congress of the Communist International was held in Moscow between 22 June and 12 July 1921. The third official meeting of the Communist International included delegations from more than 50 different national structures and took place in the back-drop of two major events; the failure of the German revolution and the introduction of New Economic Policy in Soviet Russia.

The main language of the congress was German, with three further working languages: French, English and Russian (of the three, French being predominant).

Over 600 delegates were housed at Hotel Lux.

== Agenda ==
The agenda was circulated in several languages from March 1921:

1. Report of the executive committee.
2. The world economic crisis and the new role of the Communist International.
3. Tactics of the Communist International during the revolution.
4. The period of transition (partial actions and the final revolutionary struggle).
5. The campaign against the Yellow Trade Union International of Amsterdam.
6. The International Council of Red Trade Unions and the Communist International.
7. The internal structure of the Communist Parties, their methods of action, and the essence of that action.
8. The internal structure of the Communist International—and its relations with the affiliated parties.
9. The Eastern question.
10. The Italian Socialist Party and the Communist International. (Appeal of the Italian Socialist Party against the decision of the executive committee.)
11. The K.A.P.D. and the Communist International. (Appeal of the V.K.P.D. against the decision of the executive committee.)
12. The women's movement.
13. The Young Communist movement.
14. Election of the executive committee, and designation of its place of session.
15. Miscellaneous.

== Delegates ==
There were delegates from the following countries.

Country	Party	No.
Argentina	Communist Party of Argentina	2
Armenia	Communist Party of Armenia	8
Azerbaijan	Communist Party of Azerbaijan	6
Austria	Communist Party of Austria	7
Austria	Poalei Zion	14
Australia	Communist Party of Australia	4
Baku	Young Communist International	1
Baku	Eastern Bureau	2
Bashkir Autonomous Soviet Socialist Republic	Communist Party of Bashkiria	2
Belgium	Socialist Revolutionaries	2
Belgium	Young Communist International	1
Belgium	Communist Party of Belgium	2
Britain	Communist Party of Great Britain	14
Britain	Socialist Party	1
Britain	Anti-Parliamentary Communist Federation	1
Bukhara	Communist Party of Bukhara	7
Bulgaria	Bulgarian Communist Party	19
Bulgaria	Young Communist International	1
Canada	Socialist Party of Canada	1
China	Chinese Communist Party	1
China	Young Communist International	1
Constantinople	Communist Party of Turkey	1
Czechoslovakia	Communist Party of Czechoslovakia	27
Czechoslovakia	Young Communist International	2
Denmark	Communist Party of Denmark	6
Egypt	Communist Party of Egypt	1
Estonia	Communist Party of Estonia	5
Estonia	Estonian Independent Socialist Workers' Party	2
Estonia	Young Communist International	1
Far Eastern Republic	Russian Communist Party (bolsheviks)	1
Far Eastern Republic	Young Communist International	1
Finland	Communist Party of Finland	30
France	Communist Party of France	8
France	Syndicalists	9
France	Young Communist International	3
France	Syndicalist Minority	11
Fünfkirchen	Socialist Party	3
Georgia	Communist Party of Georgia	11
Georgia	Young Communist International	1
Germany	Communist Workers' Party of Germany (KAPD)	5
Germany	United Communist Party of Germany	25
Germany	Young Communist International	8
Germany	women	1
Germany	United Communist Party of Germany (opposition)	2
Greece	Communist Party of Greece	3
Hungary	Communist Party of Hungary	12
Hungary	Young Communist International	1
India		4
India	Young Communist International	1
Iran	Communist Party of Iran	5
Ireland	Communist Party of Ireland	2
Italy	Communist Party of Italy	21
Italy	Young Communist International	4
Italy	Socialist Party of Italy	4
Java	Communist Union of the Indies	1
Khiva	Young Communist International	1
Khirgizia	Communist Party of Kirghizia	1
Korea	Communist Party of Korea	1
Latvia	Communist Party of Latvia	11
Latvia	Young Communist International	1
Lithuania	Communist Party of Lithuania	9
Lithuania	Young Communist International	2
Luxemburg	Communist Party of Luxemburg	4
Luxemburg	Socialist Party of Luxemburg	1
Luxemburg	Young Communist International	1
Mexico	Communist Party of Mexico	1
Mexico	Young Communist International	1
Mongolia	Mongolian People's Revolutionary Party	1
Near East	Young Communist International	1
Netherlands	Communist Party of the Netherlands	5
Netherlands	Young Communist International	1
Norway	Norwegian Labour Party	11
Norway	Young Communist International	1
Norway	Communist Party of Norway	1
Palestine	Communist Party of Palestine	1
Poale Zion		1
Poland	Communist Party of Poland	20
Poland	Bund	3
Romania	Communist Party of Romania	10
Romania	Young Communist International	4
Russia	Communist Party of Russia (Bolshevik)	72
Russia	Young Communist International	4
South Africa	International Socialist League	1
Sweden	Communist Party of Sweden	15
Sweden	Young Communist International	3
Switzerland	Communist Party of Switzerland	13
Switzerland	Young Communist International	2
Spain	Communist Party of Spain	5
Spain	Communist Workers Party of Spain	4
Spain	Syndicalists	5
Tatar Autonomous Soviet Socialist Republic	Tatarstan Regional Committee of the Communist Party (Bolshevik)	1
Turkey	Communist Party of Turkey	4
Turkestan	Communist Party of Russia (Bolshevik)	4
Turkestan	Revolutionary League	4
Ukraine	Communist Party of Ukraine	22
United States of America	United Communist Party of America	10
United States of America	Young Communist International	2
United States of America	Japanese Communist Group	1
Byelorussian Soviet Socialist Republic	Communist Party (bolsheviks) of Byelorussia	2
Yugoslavia	Communist Party of Yugoslavia	10
Yugoslavia	Young Communist International	1

=== Armenia ===
The Communist Party of Armenia delegation was led by Sarkis Kasyan. Other delegates included Sahak Ter-Gabrielyan and Avis Nurijanyan.

=== Azerbaijan ===
The Communist Party of Azerbaijan delegation included Gazanfar Musabekov, Ibrahim Abilov and Mikheil Kakhiani.

=== Austria ===
The Communist Party of Austria delegation included Franz Koritschoner, Joseph Frey, Jacob Riehs and Karl Steinhardt.

=== Australia ===
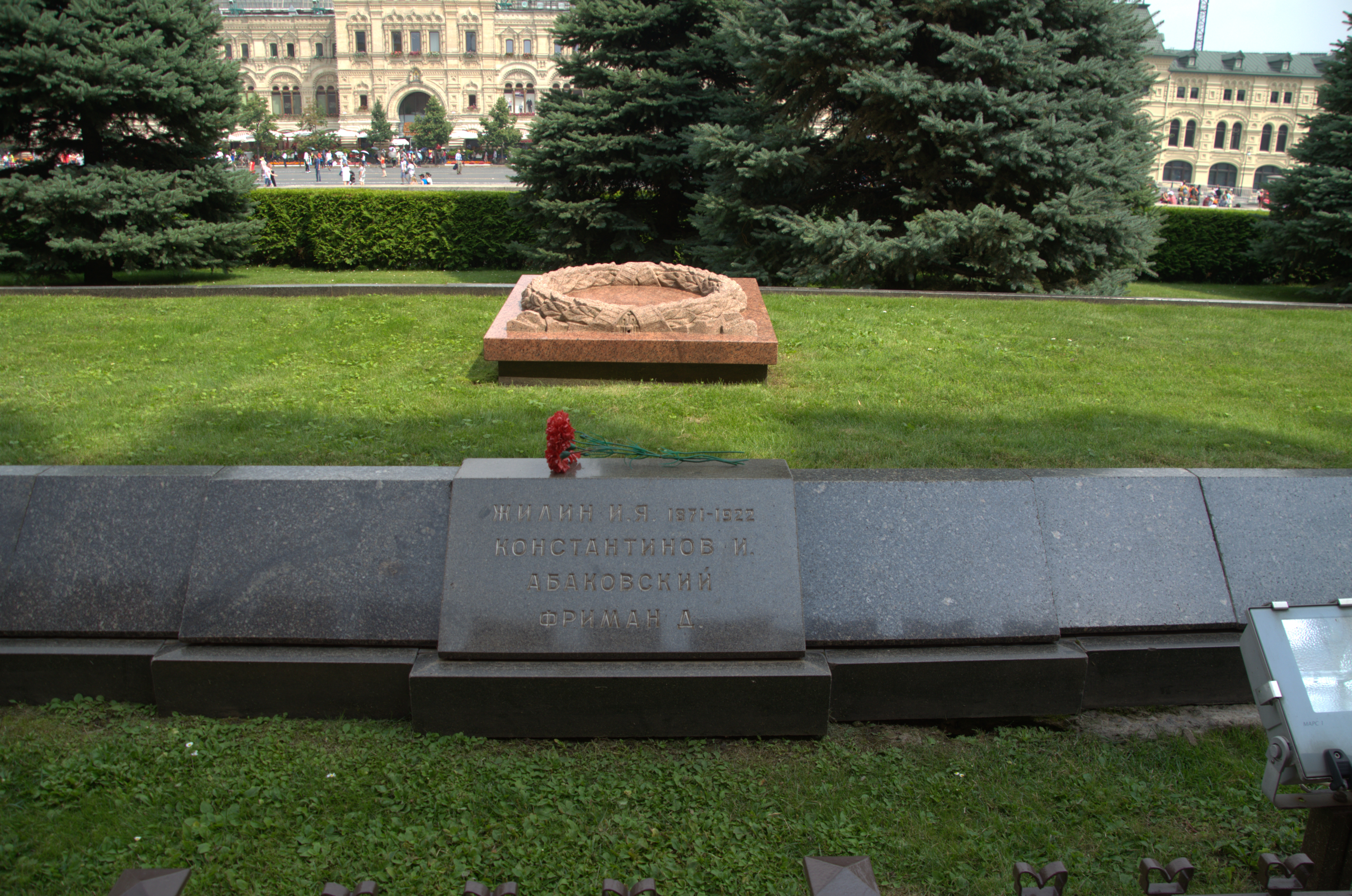
Mass grave No. 13 at the Kremlin Wall Necropolis where Freeman, Konstantinov and Abakovsky, victims of the Aerowagon crash, were buried

By the time of the third Comintern congress the Australian Socialist Party and the Communist Party of Australia had not settled differences between the two parties. Both groups sent delegations to the congress, with Paul Freeman being sent by the ASP to represent the party. The CPA leader William Earsman travelled together with Jack Howie (Australian delegate to the RILU congress), reaching Great Britain and from there went to Moscow where they arrived on 13 June 1921. Upon arrival in Moscow the CPA delegates realised that they had beaten the ASP leader Paul Freeman in the quest to arrive first to the congress, but that another ASP member Alf Rees had already reached the city to attend the RILU congress. Rees had already acquired the Comintern congress credentials for the ASP delegation. Freeman arrived later whilst a third ASP delegate, Jim Quinton, was arrested in England whilst en route to Moscow.

Freeman died in the Aerowagon experimental monorail crash on 24 July 1921, along with his close friend Commissar Artem. Both were buried at the Kremlin Wall Necropolis.

=== Argentina ===
Rodolfo José Ghioldi represented the Communist Party of Argentina at the congress. Ghiodi travelled to Russia on 29 May 1921, and attended the congress with a consultative vote. He carried a greeting from the Uruguayan communists to the congress. Zalman Yaselman, a former member of the Russian Communist Group in Argentina and a founder of the International Socialist Party (the earlier incarnation of the Communist Party), accompanied Ghiodi in his travels to Moscow and attended the congress but without obtaining an official credential.

Mikhail Yaroshevsky arrived in Moscow on 1 June 1921, as a correspondent of Argentinian trade union and Communist Party newspapers, and assisted the congress.

=== Belgium ===
Two delegations from Belgium attended the congress - the 'Left-Wing of the Belgian Labour Party' (a name assigned to the faction from Comintern side) and the 'Communist Party of Belgium'. The former group, led by Joseph Jacquemotte, was the faction around the publication L'Exploité who had broken away from the Belgian Labour Party and reconstituted themselves under the name 'Communist Party of Belgium' in May 1921. The latter group, led by War Van Overstraeten, emerged in August 1920 as members of the Belgian Socialist Youth broke with the Belgian Labour Party and formed a communist organization with the newspaper L'Ouvrier communiste as their organ. Both groups had been invited by the Comintern to send two delegates each to the third Comintern congress, to ensure negotiations during the congress proceedings on a merger of the Belgian communists into a single Communist Party.

Jules Poulet accompanied Jaquemotte at the congress as the second member of the 'Left-Wing of the Belgian Labour Party' delegation. Félix Coenen was the second member of the 'Communist Party of Belgium' delegation.

Posterior to the talks in Moscow at the Comintern congress, the two factions merged into the Communist Party of Belgium at a congress 3-4 September 1921.

=== Britain ===
The delegation of the Communist Party of Great Britain was led by Tom Bell (politician). Other CPGB delegates included Norah Smyth, Tom Mann, F. L. Kerran, Thomas Quelch, Joseph J. Vaughan, J. T. Murphy, Harry Pollitt, Ellen Wilkinson and William J. Hewlett. During the congress Bell was pressured by the Comintern on the track record of performance of the CPGB.

The Socialist Labour Party sent James Clunie to attend the congress. Whilst the 1921 SLP party conference had voted against a merger with CPGB (17 votes against, 5 votes in favour) the party continued to identify itself with the Comintern. The party conference overwhelmingly voted in favour (21 votes to 1) to seek membership in Comintern and named Clunie as its delegate to the third Comintern congress. The Comintern credentials committee did not award delegate credentials to Clunie (as the SLP had refused to merge with CPGB) but awarded him guest status at the congress. Rose Witcop of the Anti-Parliamentary Communist Federation travelled Moscow to (unsuccessfully) negotiate for 'associate membership' in Comintern for her faction at the congress.

=== Czechoslovakia ===
In May 1921 the Communist Party of Czechoslovakia had been founded, in which the Czech Marxist Left and the Marxist Left in Slovakia and the Transcarpathian Ukraine (which had amalgamated the Slovak left socialists and the International Socialist Party of Subcarpathian Rus'). But the merger of the Communist Party of Czechoslovakia and the Communist Party of Czechoslovakia (German Division) had not yet taken place. At the Third Congress, there were 27 party delegates and 2 youth delegates from Czechoslovakia.

The Czechoslovak delegation arrived in Moscow via Riga on 4 June 1921. The delegation had been stuck in Berlin for a week.

The largest contingent came from the Communist Party of Czechoslovakia, with 20 delegates. The erstwhile leader of the Czech Marxist Left and founder of the Communist Party of Czechoslovakia, Bohumír Šmeral, attended the congress but was not listed as a delegate of any specific party. The delegation included Edmund Burian, Heřman Tausik, Matej Kršiak (Ružomberok), Miloš Vaněk, Jaroslav Handlíř (Prague), Josef Skalàk, Otto Rydlo (Třebíč), Jan Doležal (Brno), Václav Douša (Prague), Oldřich Formánek (Mladá Boleslav), Metoděj Galla (Brno), Rudolf Hájek (Prague), Jan Jaroš (Radvanice), Marie Knytlová (Brno), Anna Křenová (Prague), Zavadil (Prague), Tomáš Koutný (Hodonín), František Koza (Hradec Králové), František Kučera (Kladno), František Melichar (Pardubice) and František Sailer (Louny) There were additionally a number of Magyar delegates from Slovakia in the Communist Party of Czechoslovakia delegation. Another four Communist Party of Czechoslovakia cadres had been named as delegates to the congress, but they had been denied passports and were thus unable to travel.

Burian was named as head of the Communist Party of Czechoslovakia delegation, Kršiak was named deputy delegation leader, Handlíř as delegation secretary and Vaněk the delegation rapporteur. The delegation brought a memorandum to the congress, requesting affiliation to the Comintern.

The Communist Party of Czechoslovakia (German Division) had 5 delegates at the congress. The party leader Karl Kreibich was one of the German delegates. The Polish communist group in Czechoslovakia had a single delegate, Karol Śliwka. Rudolf Kohn was a delegate of the revolutionary Poalei Zion faction.

During the congress proceedings, Lenin highlighted support for Šmeral's tactical line for the communists in Czechoslovakia. Per Trason (1955) this positioning could be explained as linked to the adoption of the NEP which included ideas of emphasizing closer connections to broader popular masses akin to those of Šmeral.

The congress deliberated on the membership application of the Communist Party of Czechoslovakia. The Czechoslovak communists were admitted to the Comintern on the condition that the Czechoslovak and German communists merge into a single party.

=== Bukhara ===
The Communist Party of Bukhara sent a 7-member delegation to the congress. The Bukharan delegation protested against the measure to only allowing consultative status, arguing that Bukhara was a 'prominent, significant stronghold of the proletarian revolution in the East'.

=== Bulgaria ===
The Bulgarian Communist Party sent a 19-member delegation to the congress. Vasil Kolarov and Georgi Dimitrov led the Bulgarian delegation. Kolarov presided over the congress. Head of BKP delegation (Sofia)

The other Bulgarian party delegates were Dmitr Popov (Barna), Ivan Konstantinov, Krum Kyulyavkov, Nayden Kirov (lawyer from Ruse), Salcho Vasilev, Vladimir Blagoev, Ivan Abadjiev, Ana Maimunkova (Haskovo), Todor Lukanov (Pleven), Pencho Dvoryanov (Dereli), Todor Atanasov (metal worker from Sofia), Vasil Tabachkin (Pleven), Lulcho Chervenkov (Zlatitsa), Gencho Petrov (Barna), Ivan K. (miner from Gorna Oryahovitsa), Koemdzhiev (textile worker, Sliven) and Ivan Minkov.

At the time of the 2nd World Congress of the Comintern in 1920 one of two boats used by the Bulgarian Communist Party to cross the Black Sea was captured by Romanian forces and Vasil Kolarov, Georgi Dimitrov and Kosta Yankov had been jailed. This time, the Bulgarian Communist Party prepared differently to transport their delegation to Soviet Russia. Those delegates who could get passports travelled via Vienna, whilst others travelled by boat over the Black Sea.

=== Canada ===
In the lead-up to first congress of RILU, the U.S. communist organizer Ella Reeve Bloor travelled to Winnipeg where she sought to convince the One Big Union leader Robert B. Russell to attend the event. Russell did not agree, and Bloor then travelled to Toronto where she met with another OBU organizer, Joseph R. Knight. Knight would travel to Moscow along with the U.S. delegation and attended both the Comintern congress and the RILU congress. The used the pseudonym 'Morgan' whilst in Soviet Russia. Knight was a member of the Socialist Party of Canada, and was listed as a Socialist Party delegate in the Comintern congress documentation.

=== China ===
Zhang Tailei represented the Chinese Communist Party (CCP) at the congress. His participation was effectively managed by the Far Eastern Bureau of the Communist International in Irkutsk, a process that the CCP was unaware of. Zhang had no contact with the CCP in China. Afterward the CCP ratified the nomination of Zhang. Zhang would address the congress plenary.

=== Cuba ===
M. Díaz Ramírez had received a credential from José Rubio to represent the Communist Section of Cuba in the Mexican Region at the Third Congress.

=== Japan ===
Kondo Eizo was unable to attend the Congress. Two Japanese delegates were present, Taguchi Unzo and Yoshiwara Gentaro, participating in individual capacity with consultative vote. Both were living in the United States. Taguchi was nominated by Katayama Sen as the representative of the Japanese socialist group in the United States. Yoshiwara was also a participant in the Japanese socialist group, as well as a member of the Industrial Workers of the World and a participant at the Congress of the Peoples of the East held at Baku in September 1920.

=== Socialist Labor Party of America ===
Although the Socialist Labor Party had rejected the 21 conditions, it sent two observers to the Third Congress. The delegation faced some difficulties, as another SLP member and delegate to the Profintern congress Adolf S. Carm, was arrested in Moscow accused of 'having given assistance to the state in repression of IWW'. The two SLP delegates to the Third Congress were also questions. Carm was released after a second arrest following a notification to Lenin and after the two SLP Third Congress delegates had vouched for him.

=== Planned art festival ===
Lunacharsky had planned a mass cultural festival to coincide with the congress. It was to display the history of mankind, from the Stone Age, to antiquity (ancient Egypt), feudalism, capitalism, the victory of the Communist International and building the future. It was conceptualized as a mass worker peasant opera with orchestra, chorus, dancers performed in large amphitheater. The festival was cancelled due to economic constraints.
