= Communist Party of Czechoslovakia (German Division) =

Communist Party of Czechoslovakia (German Division) Kommunistische Partei der Tschechoslowakei (Deutsche Abteilung)
- Chairman: Karl Kreibich
- Founded: March 12, 1921
- Dissolved: October 30, 1921
- Split from: German Social Democratic Workers Party in the Czechoslovak Republic
- Merged into: Communist Party of Czechoslovakia
- Newspaper: Vorwärts
- Women's wing: National Women's Secretariat
- Membership (1921): 40,000
- Ideology: Communism
- International affiliation: Communist International

The Communist Party of Czechoslovakia (German Division), Section of the Communist International (German: Kommunistische Partei der Tschechoslowakei (Deutsche Abteilung), Sektion der Kommunistischen Internationale) was a communist party in Czechoslovakia. The party emerged from a split in the German labour movement in the Czechoslovak Republic and functioned parallel to the Czech Marxist left movement for most of 1921. The party represented a more radical position compared to the Czech Marxist left, and fully supported adherence to the Communist International. It eventually merged into the Communist Party of Czechoslovakia.

== Split in DSAP ==
The Communist Party of Czechoslovakia (German Division) originated in a split in the German Social Democratic Workers Party in the Czechoslovak Republic (DSAP) 1920–1921. The radicalization among the German socialists in Czechoslovakia could be traced to the influence from refugees from Hungary following the defeat of the Hungarian Soviet Republic. The leftwing elements in the DSAP, centered in Liberec (German: Reichenberg) and led by Karl Kreibich, took part in the December 1920 general strike. The DSAP party leadership issued a statement on January 8, 1921, condemning the Liberec party branch for violation of party discipline. The DSAP left responded by declaring their support for the formation of a Communist Party. DSAP expelled its Liberec branch on January 17, 1921, which in turn held a conference on January 30, 1921, and issued an appeal for an extraordinary party conference to be held March 12, 1921. The expelled Liberec DSAP branch was joined by other German left-wing social democrats in working towards founding a new party.

== Founding party conference ==
The founding party conference (Parteitag) of the Communist Party of Czechoslovakia (German Division) was held in Liberec-Nové Pavlovice (Neu Paulsdorf in German) on March 12–15, 1921. The Liberec party conference unanimously adopted, without any debate, a resolution declaring the founding of the party. The party conference approved the 21 theses of the Communist International and issued a request, without any preconditions, for affiliation to the International. 160 delegates participated in the party conference.

The Union of Communist Groups of Stanislav Kostka Neumann attended the conference, and Neumann held a speech to the delegates.

== Building the party ==
About a quarter of the DSAP membership, over 40,000 people, joined the new party. Kreibich, along with his colleague Alois Neurath, built the party with inspiration from the Communist Party of Germany (KPD). On March 15, 1921, the newly constituted Central Committee of the party elected Kreibich as its chairman, Joska as treasurer and Kreutz as deputy treasurer. The executive committee constituted the same day included Kreibich, Alois Neurath, Joska, Kreutz and Sitte.

As per the statutes adopted in the founding party conference, the new party was divided into 18 district organizations (Kreisorganisationen): Aussig, Bodenbach, Böhmisch Leipa, Brünn, Freiwaldau, Grulich, Karlsbad, Komotau, Krummau, Mies, Mährisch-Ostrau, Mährisch-Schönberg, Olmütz, Prag, Reichenberg, Töplitz, Trautenau and Warnsdorf. The district organizations were further divided into local branches. The party central struggled with the number of requests from local cadres to set up local branches.

== Party press ==
The party had a printing house of its own, with four rapid presses, a rotary press and five typesetting machines. Prior to the founding of the Communist Party of Czechoslovakia (German Division), the organ of Liberec left was the daily newspaper Vorwärts ('Forward'). Ahead of the founding party conference the German communists had founded Internationale ('International') as a second daily organ, carrying the subtitle 'communist organ for the North-West Bohemian workers', and a weekly newspaper, Südböhmische Arbeiterzeitung ('South Bohemian Workers' Newspaper', appearing January 5, 1921). On April 2, 1921, another weekly newspaper was launched, Ostböhmische Arbeiterzeitung ('East Bohemian Workers' Newspaper'). On May 1, 1921, a third daily party organ emerged, Kampf ("Struggle"), with the subtitle 'communist organ for Silesia and North Moravia'. The party launched the publication Weckruf ('Wake-up call') for mass distribution among urban and rural workers. Another party publication was Der kommunistische Gewerkschafter ('The Communist Trade Unionist'), later renamed Der rote Gewerkschafter ('The Red Trade Unionist').

== National Women's Secretariat ==
Parallel to the founding party conference in Liberec, a national women's conference (Frauenreichskonferenz) was held. The party had a National Women's Secretariat (Reichssekretariat der Frauen). The secretariat had a publication of its own, Die Kommunistin ('The Woman Communist'), which had a circulation of 13,000 copies.

== Merger with the Czech left ==
Notably, the Communist Party of Czechoslovakia (German Division) was the first communist party in the new republic, with the Czech Marxist left forming their party only in May 1921. Lenin in particular was pushing for the unification of the communist movement in Czechoslovakia into a single party, a move that the Czech leftists had initially resisted. The German communists had taken a more radical stand than the Czech left leader Bohumír Šmeral, who for tactical reasons hesitated in forming a new party. Šmeral sought to gather as many left social democrats as possible before formalizing the split in the Czech social democracy, prompting Kreibich to accuse the Czech Marxist left of being a platform for 'centrists' and 'opportunists'. Drawing from the experiences of the building of the KPD, Kreibich sought to utilize the same approach to Šmeral's group as the Spartacus League had employed in winning over large parts of the Independent Social Democratic Party of Germany.

In April 1921, a meeting between representatives of the Communist International and Czech and German communists from Czechoslovakia was held in Dresden, at which it was agreed in principle to form a unified Communist Party in the Czechoslovak Republic.

Kreibich represented the Communist Party of Czechoslovakia (German Division) at the third congress of the Communist International, held in Moscow June–July 1921. The dispute between the Šmeral and Kreibich factions was resolved at this meeting, the Comintern instructed that a unified international Communist Party to be formed in Czechoslovakia within three months (which Šmeral had resisted) whilst Kreibich was reprimanded for 'leftist deviations'. During the summer of 1921 local joint international communist organizations emerged around the country, gathering Czech, German and (in the case of Ostrava) Polish communists.

A unification party conference, merging the Communist Party of Czechoslovakia and the Communist Party of Czechoslovakia (German Division), was held between October 30, 1921, and November 4, 1921. Šmeral and Kreibich were the main speakers at the event. All 169 delegates at the conference voted in favour of a unified Communist Party, without any distinction of nationality.
