= Neurath =

Neurath is a surname. Notable people with the surname include:

- Alois Neurath (1886–1955), Sudeten German dissident communist activist
- Carolina Neurath (born 1985), Swedish journalist and writer
- Eva Neurath (1908–1999), British publisher
- Hans Neurath (1909–2002), founding chairman of the Department of Biochemistry at the University of Washington in Seattle
- Konstantin von Neurath (1873–1956), German diplomat, foreign minister of Germany between 1932 and 1938
- Marie Neurath (1898–1986), member of the team that developed the Vienna Method of Pictorial Statistics, later renamed Isotype
- Olga Hahn-Neurath (1882–1937), Austrian mathematician and philosopher
- Otto Neurath (1882–1945), Austrian philosopher of science, sociologist, and political economist
- Paul Neurath, creator of computer games
- Walter Neurath (1903–1967), British publisher
- Wilhelm Neurath, (1840–1901), Austrian political economist

== See also ==
- Neurath (Grevenbroich), a town in the Rhein-Kreis Neuss, in North Rhine-Westphalia, Germany
- Neurath Power Station, lignite-fired power station at Neurath in Grevenbroich, North Rhine-Westphalia, Germany
