= Karl Kreibich (politician, born 1883) =

German politician and author in Czechoslovakia (1883–1966)

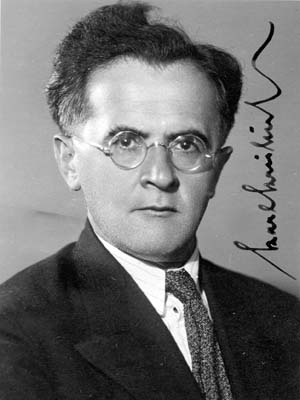
Karl Kreibich

Karl Kreibich (14 December 1883 – 2 August 1966), also known as Karel Kreibich, was a Sudeten German communist politician and author in Czechoslovakia. Kreibich emerged as the main leader of the revolutionary socialist movement amongst German workers in Bohemia after the First World War. He was a leader of the Communist Party of Czechoslovakia and a functionary of the Communist International. During the First Czechoslovak Republic, he was elected to parliament thrice (twice to the Chamber of Deputies and once to the Senate). During the Second World War he was part of the exiled Czechoslovak State Council, based in London. After the war he served as Czechoslovak ambassador to the Soviet Union.

== Youth and war years ==
Kreibich was born in Zwickau on 14 December 1883. Kreibich joined the Social Democratic Workers Party of Austria in 1902. Between 1906 and 1911 he served as the editor of the weekly Freigeist 1906–1911, issued from Reichenau. In 1909 he organized a youth movement in Northern Bohemia, and served as its chairman between 1909 and 1915. He moved on to become the chief editor of Vorwärts, serving in said function from 1911 until the start of the World War. As the First World War broke out in 1914, Kreibich supported Lenin's call against the war. Kreibich did military service between 1915 and 1918.

== German-Bohemian revolutionary leader ==
Kreibich emerged as a leader of the revolutionary sections in the German-speaking areas of Bohemia. After the war, he became the chairman of the Reichenberg branches of the German Social Democratic Workers Party in the Czechoslovak Republic (DSAP) and its youth organization. He was elected to the Czechoslovak Chamber of Deputies in 1920, standing as a DSAP candidate in the 4th electoral district. The leftwing elements in the DSAP, centered in Reichenberg and led by Kreibich, took part in the December 1920 general strike. The DSAP party leadership issued a statement on 8 January 1921, condemning the Reichenberg party branch for violation of party discipline. The DSAP left responded by declaring their support for the formation of a Communist Party. DSAP expelled its Reichenberg branch on 17 January 1921. The expelled DSAP left founded the Communist Party of Czechoslovakia (German Division) in March 1921. On 15 March 1921 the newly constituted Central Committee of the party elected Kreibich as its chairman.

== Building the Communist Party ==
Kreibich, along with his colleague Alois Neurath, built the new party with inspiration from the Communist Party of Germany (KPD). Notably, the Communist Party of Czechoslovakia (German Division) was the first communist party in the new republic, with the Czech Marxist left forming their party only in May 1921. Lenin in particular was pushing for the unification of the communist movement in Czechoslovakia into a single party, a move that the Czech leftists had initially resisted. The German communists had taken a more radical stand than the Czech left leader Bohumír Šmeral, who for tactical reasons hesitated in forming a new party. Šmeral sought to gather as many left social democrats as possible before formalizing the split in the Czech social democracy, prompting Kreibich to accuse the Czech Marxist left of being a platform for 'centrists' and 'opportunists'. Drawing from the experiences of the building of the KPD, Kreibich sought to utilize the same approach to Šmeral's group as the Spartacus League had employed in winning over large parts of the Independent Social Democratic Party of Germany.

Kreibich represented the Communist Party of Czechoslovakia (German Division) at the third congress of the Communist International, held in Moscow June–July 1921. The dispute between the Šmeral and Kreibich factions was resolved at this meeting, the Comintern instructed that a unified international Communist Party to be formed in Czechoslovakia within three months (which Šmeral had resisted) whilst Kreibich was reprimanded for 'leftist deviations'.

== Unification with the Czech left ==
A unification party conference, merging the Communist Party of Czechoslovakia and the Communist Party of Czechoslovakia (German Division), was held between 30 October 1921 and 4 November 1921. Šmeral and Kreibich were the main speakers at the event. All 169 delegates at the conference voted in favour of a unified Communist Party of Czechoslovakia, without any distinction of nationality. Kreibich was a member of the politburo of the Communist Party of Czechoslovakia until 1924.

== In Comintern ==
In 1922 he participated in the first and second plenums of the Executive Committee of the Communist International. Between 1924 and 1927 he worked at the Comintern headquarters, serving as the editor Kommunistische Internationale in Moscow. He was re-elected to the Czechoslovak National Assembly in the 1925 elections, representing the 4th electoral district. In 1927 he returned to Czechoslovakia, retaking his seat in the party politburo, but returned to Moscow again in 1929.

== Fascism and World War ==
He returned to Czechoslovakia in 1933, become the editor of the daily newspaper Rote Fahne ('Red Banner'). He was elected to the Czechoslovak Senate in 1935. In 1938 he emigrated to London, following the Munich Pact. In spite of his anti-fascist credentials, Kreibich was interned by British authorities due to his German ethnicity for a period. His daughter Ilse was arrested by the Gestapo in Prague and sent to concentration camp.

During the Second World War, Kreibich collaborated with Edvard Beneš' Czechoslovak government-in-exile. In 1941 he was inducted in the Czechoslovak State Council. As a member of the London-based State Council he took part in approving the controversial Beneš decrees, paving the way for mass expulsions of ethnic Germans from Czechoslovakia.

== Later years ==
He returned to Czechoslovakia in 1945. At the time, Kreibich was an established historian and scholar. In 1948 he became chairman of the Czechoslovak-Israeli Friendship Association.

Between 1950 and 1952 he served as the Czechoslovak ambassador to the Soviet Union. Kreibich fell out of favour with the Communist Party, as he emerged as a major critic of the Slánský trial. He was abruptly recalled from his Moscow posting.

From 1952 onwards, Kreibich was politically isolated. His biography did not get published, and the Institute of Party History began downgrading his past role as a founder of the communist movement in Czechoslovakia. Kreibich died in Prague on 2 August 1966.

== Bibliography ==
- Karel Kreibich (1951). Počátky českého dělnického tisku. Rovnost.
- Karl Kreibich (1920). Tabor: eine Halbjahrtausend-Feier des Kommunismus. Runge.
- Karel Kreibich (1957). Jak došlo v Německu k fašismu. Státní Naklad. Politické Literatury.
- Karel Kreibich (1968). Těsný domov - širý svět. Severočes. nakl., t. Liberecké tisk.
