= Feuchtwang =

Feuchtwang is a German surname. Notable people with the surname include:

- David Feuchtwang (1864–1936), Jewish scholar and author
- Stephan Feuchtwang (born 1937), British anthropologist and professor

== See also ==
- Feuchtwanger
