= Communist Party of Czechoslovakia (Opposition) =

- Chairman: Alois Muna
- Founded: 29 June 1929
- Dissolved: 1938
- Split from: Communist Party of Czechoslovakia
- Merged into: Czechoslovak Social Democratic Workers Party (majority wing)
- Newspaper: Komunista, Obrana Svobody, Arbeiterpolitik, Reichenberger Vorwärts
- Ideology: Communism; Bukharinism
- Political position: Left-wing

The Communist Party of Czechoslovakia (Opposition) (Czech: Komunistická strana Československa (opozice), German: Kommunistischen Partei der Tschechoslowakei (Opposition)), or simply the Communist Opposition, was a political party in Czechoslovakia 1929–1938, which was aligned with the Right Opposition in the international communist movement. During its early phase the Communist Opposition had a significant role in leading trade unions, but over time the influence of the group declined and by 1932 the majority of the group merged into the Social Democratic Workers Party.

== Split in the Communist Party of Czechoslovakia ==
The Communist Opposition in Czechoslovakia emerged from a division within the Communist Party of Czechoslovakia in the wake of the 6th World Congress of the Communist International and the 5th Party Congress of the Communist Party of Czechoslovakia. In March 1929 the tensions in the Communist Party of Czechoslovakia provoked a split in the communist-led trade union centre MVS. On March 10, 1929, the new leadership of the Communist Party declared the MVS leadership elected central secretary Josef Hais dissolved. Hais, who identified with the opposition to the new party leadership, refused to comply with the party directive and his supporters seized control of the MVS headquarter offices on Ječná Street in Prague. The Communist Party leadership then created parallel Red Trade Unions outside of MVS. On March 24, 1929, a statement of communist intellectuals (Josef Hora, Vladislav Vančura, Ivan Olbracht, Marie Majerová, Stanislav Kostka Neumann, Jaroslav Seifert and Helena Malířová) was published, which denounced the role of the Communist Party leadership in the affairs of the labour movement. On March 27, 1929, a meeting at the Communist Party senatorial club was held, with the presence of 14 communist senators and 12 members of the Chamber of Deputies, which adopted a resolution decrying the role of the new party leadership's handling of the MVS affair. Meeting participants included Bohumil Jílek, Alois Neurath and Václav Bolen. The Executive Committee of the Communist International ordered the Czechoslovak opposition leaders to arrive in Moscow for talks, but Jilek refused to comply. In May 1929 Alois Muna, O. E. Berger and other opponents of the party leadership began publishing the periodical Komunista ('Communist'), which continued publication until October 1929 when it was closed down due to financial difficulties.

Tens of thousands of Communist Party of Czechoslovakia members were expelled from the party. Jilek, Bolen, Neurath, Muna, Václav Houser, Josef Skalák and František Toužil, all prominent party leaders, were purged at a plenary of the Party Central Committee on June 1–2, 1929. Following these expulsions, the Communist opposition formed the Leninist parliamentary club on June 3, 1929, with 11 members of the Chamber of Deputies and 9 Senators.

== Foundation of the Communist Party of Czechoslovakia (Opposition) ==
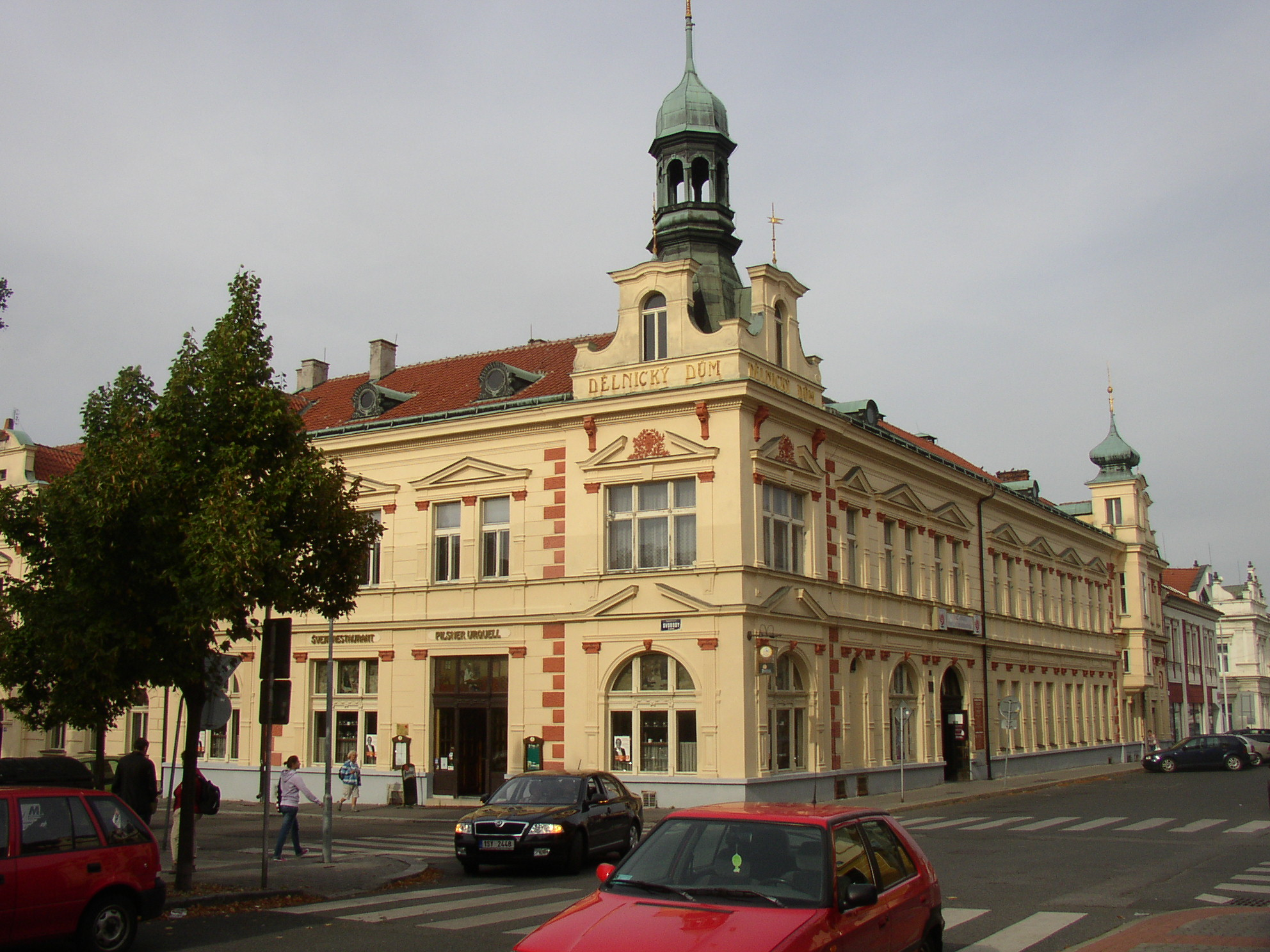
The Kladno Workers House, where the founding conference of the Communist Opposition was held June 29–30, 1929

At a conference June 29–30, 1929 the Communist Opposition was constituted as a formal organization. The meeting was held in the Workers House in Kladno. 108 delegates with voting rights and 54 delegates without vote participated in the conference. A representative of the Brno Opposition (another Communist Party splinter group), Václav Friedrich, presented greetings to the meeting. The conference debated ideological and organizational priorities, and after the conference the main programmatic lines of the organization was presented in the German-language booklet Was will die Opposition in der K. P. Tsch.? ('What does the Opposition in the C.P.Cz. want?'). The Communist Opposition affirmed support for the unity of the communist movement, loyalty to the Communist Party of Czechoslovakia (albeit denouncing the leadership as sectarian), defense of the Soviet Union and opposition to capitalism and social democracy.

At the time of the Kladno conference the Communist Opposition claimed to represent over 6,000 organized communists, hold the leading role in the MVS trade union centre and control a number of cooperatives and other labour organizations. Obrana Svobody ('Defense of Freedom'), a weekly published from Kladno edited by Muna, became the Czech-language central organ of the Communist Opposition.

The Kladno conference elected a 30-member National Working Committee (Czech: Říšský akční výbor, German: Reichsausschuß). The National Working Committee elected a 10-member executive committee (Czech: Užší výbor) consisting of Berger, Bolen, Houser, Jílek, Neurath, Muna, Skalák, Hais, Václav Sucharda and Václav Sýkora. A secretariat consisting of Houser, Berger, Neurath and Bolen was set up. The Kladno conference also elected a nine-member Control Commission led by František Hovorka. The National Working Committee held its first meeting on July 21, 1929, with Jilek as acting secretary.

== Aš Conference ==
On September 15, 1929, a conference for the Communist Opposition in the German-speaking districts was held at the Workers House in Aš. The conference was attended by 95 delegates with voting rights. Muna and Neurath attended the event as the representatives of the leadership of the Communist Opposition. The conference decided to convert the German-language weekly organ Arbeiterpolitik ('Workers Politics') into a twice weekly publication.

== 1929 elections ==
Ahead of the 1929 parliamentary elections the National Working Committee of the Communist Opposition issued an appeal for workers to vote for the candidatures of the Communist Party of Czechoslovakia. However, the Communist Opposition presented its own slates in some municipal elections. In the municipal election in Lomnice nad Popelkou held October 6, 1929 the Communist Opposition won 4 out of 30 seats in the municipal council, having obtained 376 votes. In November 1929 the Communist Opposition slate obtained 482 votes in the municipal election in Slané.

== Talks with the Brno Opposition ==
On November 28, 1929, a meeting of opposition factions was held in Brno, in which the Communist Opposition and the Brno Opposition gathered to discuss possibilities for unity. The Brno group proposed a modality of united front tactic that was not accepted by the Communist Opposition, who rejected the Brno Opposition's proposition as non-Leninist application of united front to justify rapprochement with Social Democrats (as opposed to a united front as joint mass action of communists and Social Democrats). The meeting agreed work towards unity, urging discussions in local units of the different groups in preparations for a unity congress. A Joint Working Committee was established to prepare the merger process. The National Working Committee of the Communist Opposition voted to endorse the resolutions of the November 28, 1929 meeting, with 19 voted in favour and 4 against. The four members that voted against the resolutions were Bolen, Jilek, Lipina and Kozler. On December 15, 1929, the Joint Action Committee held a meeting, which the Communist Opposition perceived as progress of the process towards merger with the Brno Opposition.

== Departure of Jilek and Bolen ==
Over time differences within the Communist Opposition emerged. In early 1930 Obrana Svoboda criticized the failure of Jilek and Toužil to contribute their parliamentary salaries to the Communist Opposition treasury since October 1929 (in line with how Communist Party parliamentarians had been obliged to contribute their salaries to the party funds). After this controversy Jilek withdrew from the Communist Opposition. Bolen also strayed away from the Communist Opposition and would later become a National Socialist politician. After the departure of leaders like Jilek and Bolen, group around Muna (the former right-wing faction of the Communist Party of Czechoslovakia) became increasingly dominant in the Communist Opposition.

In the beginning of 1930 the Communist Opposition managed to gain control over the Communist Party newspaper Reichenberger Vorwärts.

== Second National Conference ==
A process of unity between MVS and the Social Democratic trade union centre OSČ was taking place in 1930. The Second National Conference of the Communist Opposition was held on July 13, 1930, at the People's House in Michle, Prague. At the time Berger was the secretary of the Communist Opposition, Muna its chairman. 63 delegates participated. The conference endorsed the process of unity in the trade union movement. The conference adopted Reichenberger Vorwärts as the new central German language organ. By the time of the Second National Conference the year-long process of unity talks with the Brno Opposition had not borne fruits, as the Brno group had moved towards Austro-Marxist Social Democratic positions. The Brno Opposition member Burian was allowed to address the Second National Conference, but his statement was unanimously rejected by the conference participants. Heinrich Brandler of the Communist Party of Germany (Opposition) attended the conference.

The International Association of the Communist Opposition (IVKO) was founded at a conference in Berlin December 16–17, 1930. The Communist Opposition from Czechoslovakia participated in the establishment of the new international body.

== Decline of the Communist Opposition ==
The outcome of the municipal elections held on September 27, 1931 indicated the declining influence of Communist Opposition. Whilst the Communist Opposition obtained strong results in some locations, like becoming the most voted slate in Unhošť and Záluží, the group was absent from the balloting in many locations. In Prague the Communist Opposition, contesting with the list 'Unity against Fascism, Capitalism and Corruption' (Czech: Sjednocení proti kapitalismu, fašismu a korupci), got 1,174 votes (0.25%).

During the March 1932 Kladno municipal election campaign the Communist Opposition office was raided by police and Muna was briefly detained. The Communist Opposition slate, led by František Pavel, got 3 out of 42 seats in the Kladno municipal council (a result seen as a backlash for the group). After the election the Communist Opposition joined hands with Social Democrats and National Socialists for the election of the city mayor.

== Merger with the Social Democrats ==
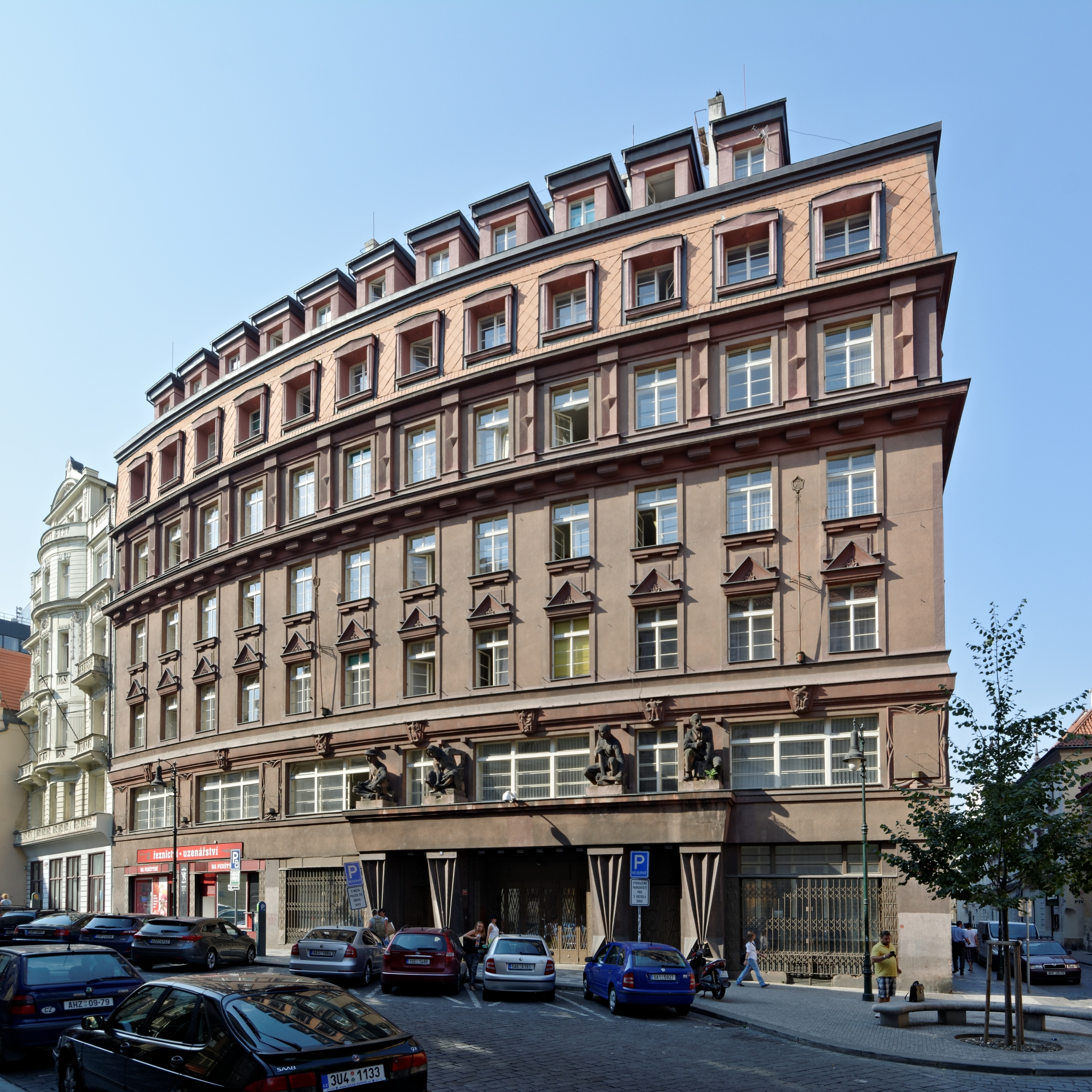
House of Trade Unions in Prague, the site of the Third National Conference of the Communist Opposition, October 16, 1932

During 1932 the group in the Communist Opposition around Neurath broke away from the movement and joined the Trotskyists. Declining in influence, the Communist Opposition moved closer to Social Democracy. In autumn of 1932, ahead of Third National Conference of the Communist Opposition, the National Working Committee discussed the possibility of a merger with the Social Democrats in order to build working class unity against the rising threat of fascism. At the Third National Conference, held at the House of Trade Unions on Na Perštýně Street in Prague, various leaders such as Hais, Berger, Václav Šturc spoke in favour of a merger. Antonín Hampl and other Social Democratic leaders attended the meeting. The 76 conference delegates unanimous voted in favour of decision to merger with Social Democrats. Publication of Obrana Svobody discontinued after the conference.

== Continued presence in Aš ==
By the end of 1932 the sole significant organized remainder of the Communist Party of Czechoslovakia (Opposition) was its local group in Aš. Christan Bloss, vice mayor of the city, was the leading figure of the group in Aš. The Aš Workers House housed the party headquarters; the same building also housed the local Communist Party of Czechosloavkia office. Arbeiterpolitik was again published as the party organ from Aš 1935–1938. J. Völkl was the manager of the publication. Around 1938-1939 Bloss and some 20 other members of the Communist Party of Czechoslovakia (Opposition) emigrated to Great Britain where they merged into the Sudeten German group of the Communist Party of Czechoslovakia.
