= Deštná =

Deštná may refer to places in the Czech Republic:

- Deštná (Blansko District), a municipality and village in the South Moravian Region
- Deštná (Jindřichův Hradec District), a town in the South Bohemian Region
- Deštná, a village and part of Dubá in the Liberec Region
- Velká Deštná, a mountain
