= Trautenauer Echo =

Trautenauer Echo was a German language newspaper published from Trautenau. The newspaper was founded in 1900. Politically it was an organ of the Social Democratic Party of Austria. Trautenauer Echo appeared weekly on Saturdays. It carried the slogan 'Organ of the Working People of North-Eastern Bohemia' (Organ für die Werktätige Bevölkerung des nordöstlichen Böhmens). Wilhelmem Kiesewetter was the editor of the newspaper during the initial period.

After the foundation of Czechoslovakia, Trautenauer Echo became an organ of the German Social Democratic Workers' Party in the Czechoslovak Republic. Around 1920 the newspaper appeared twice weekly.

As of the mid-1930s the editor-in-chief of the newspaper was Adolf Palme from Prague. Copies had between 6 and 10 pages. Around this time it appeared on Tuesdays (2,400 copies), Thursdays (1,500 copies) and Saturdays (3,800 copies). The editorial office was located on Kreuzplats.
