= Ostrauer Volksblatt =

German-language socialist newspaper

Ostrauer Volksblatt ('Ostrava People's Paper'), later renamed Der Kampf ('The Struggle'), was a German-language socialist newspaper published in Austria-Hungary, later Czechoslovakia. It was founded as a weekly newspaper by the Social Democratic Association in Moravská Ostrava (today a district of Ostrava).

The paper was printed by Verlag Wilhelm Niessner in Brünn, and from 1917 it was printed by Verlag Josef Herrman in Moravská Ostrava. In 1919 it became a regional organ of the German Social Democratic Workers Party in the Czechoslovak Republic.

In March 1921 it was converted into a daily newspaper, renamed Der Kampf, now a regional organ of the Communist Party of Czechoslovakia for Moravia and Silesia and printed from Brno. After a year, the newspaper moved to Liberec. The publication was discontinued in 1922.
