= Stephan Feuchtwang =

British researcher

Stephan Feuchtwang (born 1937) is emeritus professor of anthropology at the London School of Economics (LSE). His main area of research is China.

He was born in Berlin in 1937, the son of Wilhelm Feuchtwang and Eva Neurath. His grandfather, David Feuchtwang, was the chief rabbi of Vienna. Feuchtwang is the author of books on Chinese popular religion, feng shui, and (with Wang Mingming) a book on local leadership: Grassroots Charisma in southern Fujian and northern Taiwan.

== Selected works ==
- with Charlotte Bruckermann: The Anthropology of China. China as ethnographic and theoretical critique, Imperial College Press 2016, ISBN 978-1-78326-982-2.
- After the Event. The Transmission of Grievous Loss in Germany, China and Taiwan, berghahn 2011, ISBN 978-0-85745-086-9.
- The Anthropology of Religion, Charisma and Ghosts, De Gruyter 2010, ISBN 9783110223552.
- with Wang Mingming: Grassroots Charisma. Four Local Leaders in China, Routledge 2002, ISBN 9780415865579.
- The Imperial Metaphor: Popular Religion in China, Routledge 1992, ISBN 978-0415021463.
