= Lysice =

- Market town
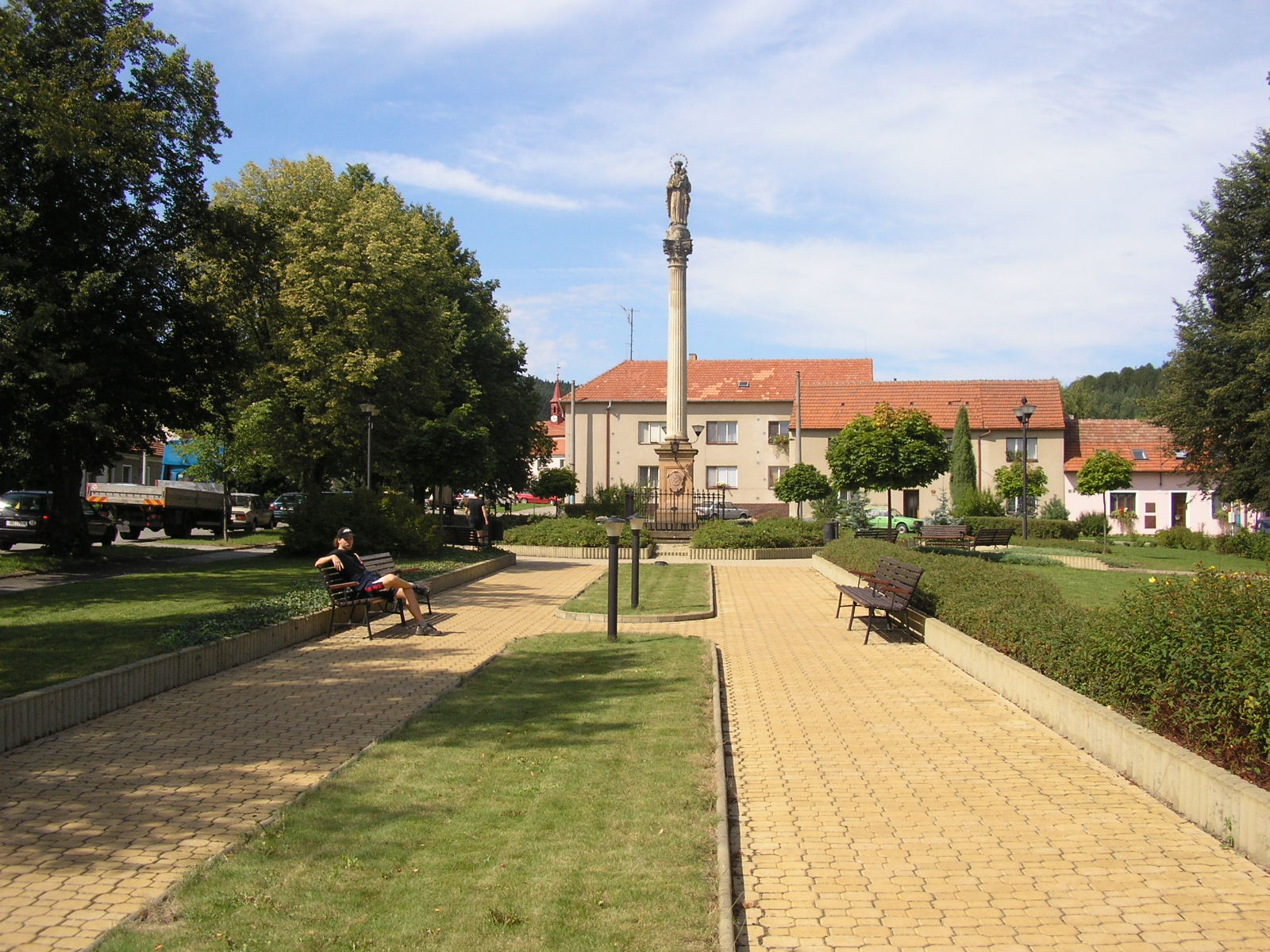
- The square Náměstí Osvobození

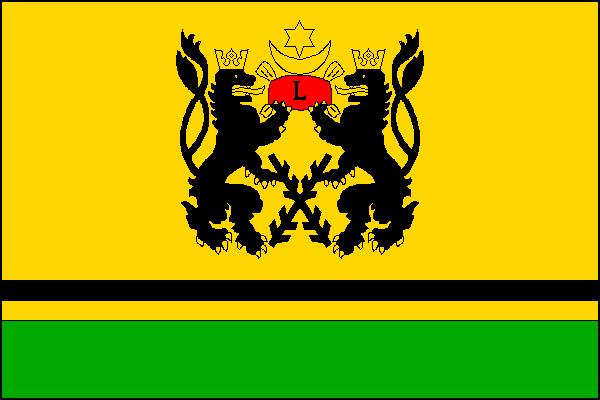
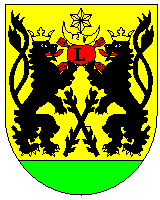
- Flag Coat of arms

- Location in the Czech Republic
- Coordinates: 49°27′6″N 16°32′14″E
- Country: Czech Republic
- Region: South Moravian
- District: Blansko
- First mentioned: 1278

Area
  - Total: 10.76 km^{2} (4.15 sq mi)
- Elevation: 362 m (1,188 ft)

Population (2026-01-01)
  - Total: 1,970
  - Density: 183/km^{2} (474/sq mi)
- Time zone: UTC+1 (CET)
  - Summer (DST): UTC+2 (CEST)
- Postal code: 679 71
- Website: www.lysice.cz

Lysice (Czech pronunciation: [ˈlɪsɪtsɛ]) is a market town in Blansko District in the South Moravian Region of the Czech Republic. It has about 2,000 inhabitants. Lysice is known for the Lysice Castle, protected as a national cultural monument.

== Geography ==
Lysice is located about 12 kilometres (7 mi) northwest of Blansko and 26 km (16 mi) north of Brno. It lies on the border between the Boskovice Furrow and Upper Svratka Highlands. The highest point is at 520 m (1,710 ft) above sea level.

== History ==
The first written mention of Lysice is from 1278. In 1316, it was bought by the Lords of Kunštát, who joined it to the Kunštát estate and owned the village until 1520. In 1520–1529, it was a property of the Pernštejn family. The next owners were the Černčický of Kácov family, who founded here a pond and started construction of a water fortress. Among the most notable owners were the Březnický of Náchod family, which held it in 1584–1678. During their rule, the fortress was finished and then rebuilt into a Renaissance castle. In 1652, Lysice was promoted to a market town.

== Demographics ==
Historical population

Year	Pop.	±%
1869	1,814	—
1880	1,895	+4.5%
1890	1,907	+0.6%
1900	1,934	+1.4%
1910	1,860	−3.8%

Year	Pop.	±%
1921	1,715	−7.8%
1930	1,629	−5.0%
1950	1,515	−7.0%
1961	1,575	+4.0%
1970	1,591	+1.0%

Year	Pop.	±%
1980	1,618	+1.7%
1991	1,798	+11.1%
2001	1,843	+2.5%
2011	1,885	+2.3%
2021	1,853	−1.7%

Source: Censuses

== Transport ==
The I/43 road (part of the European route E461) from Brno to Svitavy runs along the eastern municipal border.

== Sights ==
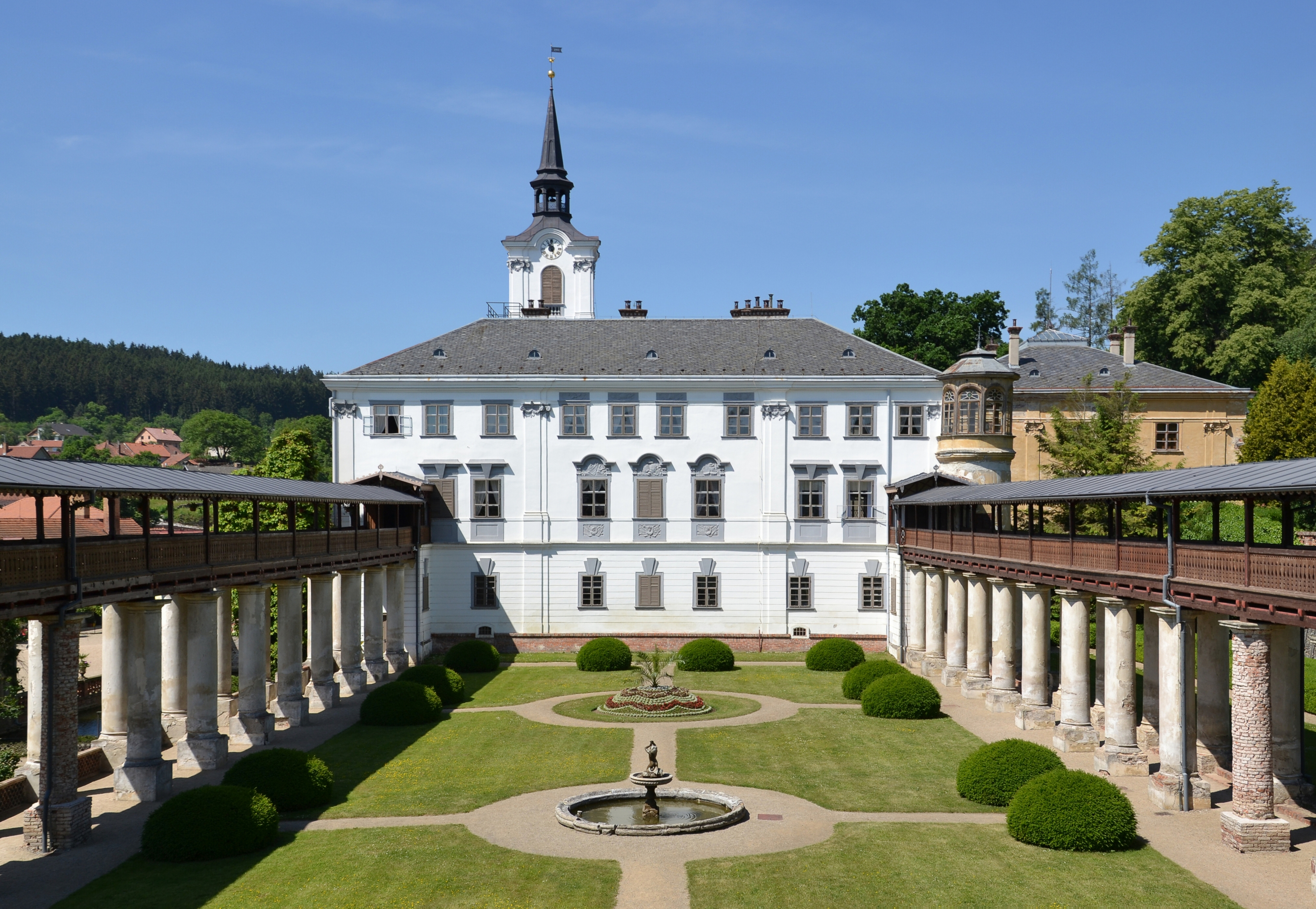
Lysice Castle

The most important monument, protected as a national cultural monument, is the Lysice Castle. It is a large complex of an architecturally valuable castle, built mostly in the Renaissance, late Baroque styles and 19th-century styles. In addition to the castle itself, the castle complex include a theatre, a garden with a colonnade, orangery and greenhouses, and others. Today the castle is owned by the state and offers guided tours.

The Church of Saints Peter and Paul has a Gothic core and preserved Renaissance tower. The church was rebuilt to its present form in 1777–1786. It has valuable Baroque interior fittings.

== Notable people ==
- Alois Muna (1886–1943), politician
