= Union of Communist Groups =

The Union of Communist Groups (Czech: Svaz komunistických skupin) was a communist organization in Czechoslovakia, led by Stanislav Kostka Neumann.

The Union of Communist Groups was founded in the spring of 1920 as followers of Neumann moved away from the Federation of Czech Anarcho-Communists. Neumann's publication Červen had carried pro-communist articles since 1919. Neumann and other anarchists around Červen had tried to work within the Czechoslovak Socialist Party, but felt disillusioned with the party after the 1920 Czechoslovak parliamentary election. With the founding of the Union of Communist Groups Červen issued a declaration denouncing any collaboration with the Czechoslovak Socialist Party. A workers conference was organized in Lom May 23–24, 1920 at which Neumann declared the objective of the new organization to be in line with the Communist International (Comintern), and called for the formation of workers, peasants and soldiers' soviets. Nevertheless, in practice the group retained many anarchist political traits it spite of its support to the Comintern.

The Union of Communist Groups sent a delegation to the 2nd World Congress of the Comintern; consisting of Ivan Olbracht, Emanuel Vajtauer, Hugo Sonnenschein and Helena Malířová. Following the congress, the Union of Communist Groups unsuccessfully sought recognition as the Czechoslovak section of the International. The Union of Communist Group expressed strong criticism against the Social Democratic Left led by Bohumír Šmeral, accusing it of opportunism. But the Comintern had not fully given up hope in Šmeral's group.

The Union of Communist Groups was dissolved in the summer of 1921, encouraging its members to join the Communist Party of Czechoslovakia instead.
