= Eva Neurath =

British publisher (1908–1999)

Eva Urvasi Neurath (née Itzig; 22 August 1908 – 27 December 1999) was a British publisher, the co-founder in 1949, with her husband, Walter Neurath, of Thames & Hudson.

== Biography ==
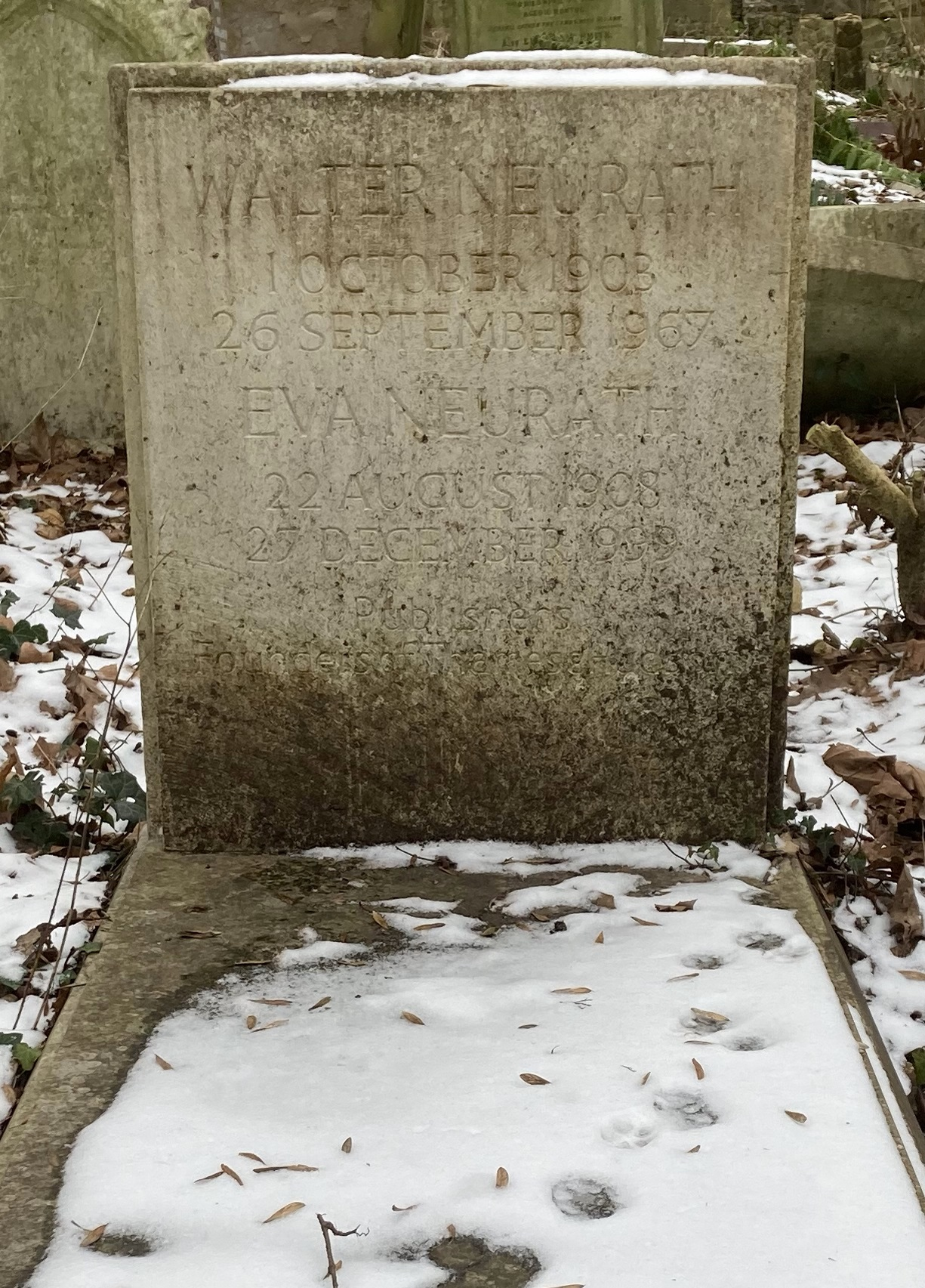
Grave of Walter and Eva Neurath in Highgate Cemetery (west side)

She was born in Berlin, the youngest of Rudolf Itzig, a Jewish clothier's five daughters. He died when she was eight.

With the rise of the Nazis, she came to England with her second husband, Wilhelm Feuchtwang (son of David Feuchtwang, chief rabbi of Vienna), and their son Stephan Feuchtwang.

In 1949, she founded art publishing house Thames & Hudson and was one of the pioneers of the so-called integrated spread, in which text and images were integrated with each other in compositions. An expertise of hers was reproducing colours of art in high-quality prints, with one of her last efforts being the coverage of the 1985 Francis Bacon Tate Gallery.

In 1953, she married Walter Neurath. He was her third husband, and she was his third wife. They are buried together in Highgate Cemetery (west side).
