= Bohumil Jílek =

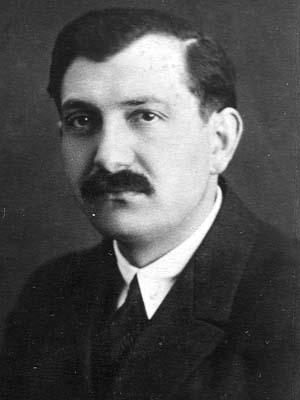

Bohumil Jílek (17 October 1892 – 3 August 1963) was a Czechoslovak politician.

== Life ==
Jílek was born in Deštná in the Jindřichův Hradec District, the son of Jan Jílek, a local policeman, and his wife Františka née Vosolová.

From 1925 to 1929 he was General Secretary of the Communist Party of Czechoslovakia. Deposed by Klement Gottwald, he joined a new parliamentary club called Communist Party of Czechoslovakia (Leninists). He then worked as a journalist. After 1948, he left for France and later emigrated to the United States.

He died in 1963 in New York City.
