= Walter Neurath =

British publisher (1903–1967)

Walter Neurath (1903–1967) was a British publisher, the co-founder in 1949, with his wife, Eva Neurath, of Thames & Hudson.

== Early life ==
Neurath was born in Josefstädterstrasse, Vienna, Austria on 1 October 1903, the only child of Alois Neurath (1886–1955) and his wife, Gisela Fröhlich (d. 1944), who had moved from Bratislava ten years earlier. Walter spent his entire childhood in Vienna, where his father owned a wholesale tea, coffee, and luxury foods importation business. He was educated at the Volks Schule and the Real Gymnasium from which he matriculated with distinction. He then attended the University of Vienna where he studied art history, archaeology, and history, becoming, in 1922, a member of the Institute for Art History. At the same time he worked for the art book publisher Würthle & Sohn and organized various art exhibitions, including one in Paris of nineteenth-century French paintings from Viennese collections. He also lectured on art history to the Austrian equivalent of the Workers' Educational Association.

== Career ==
=== Vienna ===
After four years working in the family firm, acquiring routine business skills, in 1929 Neurath turned to full-time publishing, with a strong interest in printing and typography. He joined the Verlag für Kulturforschung (‘publishing house for cultural research’), and Zinner Verlag, which published fiction and where, after six months, he was made production director. There he published a number of illustrated books, and German language translations of English and American books. The rise to power in Germany of the Nazi Party effectively closed the main German language market for this Jewish firm which therefore decided to cease trading in 1935.

For the next two years Neurath worked as an educational publisher, developing new illustration techniques and creating, as general editor, a series of illustrated textbooks for children designed as an educational counter-influence to Nazi ideology. The books had a strong democratic and anti-totalitarian bias and were translated into seven foreign languages by like-minded publishers abroad. In 1937 Neurath was appointed manager of the Wilhelm Frick publishing house, where he continued to commission and publish both illustrated books on the arts and anti-Nazi propaganda. However, on the occupation of Austria by the Nazis he was ordered to cease publishing immediately and a Nazi-approved Commissar was appointed to run the company.

=== England ===
Because of his anti-Nazi publishing activities, Neurath was soon on the Gestapo lists and, after several near misses and a period in hiding, managed to escape to England on 1 June 1938, taking with him his second wife, Marianne. His sponsor for entry into England as an alien was Frances Margesson, wife of Captain (later Viscount) Margesson; the Neuraths stayed with the Margessons at Boddington, near Rugby, for some five years and their son Thomas was born there. Neurath was offered work by a company called Adprint, run by a fellow refugee, Wolfgang Foges. He soon became the production manager designing and producing the successful King Penguin series, effectively Penguin's first hardcover books. Neurath went on to develop a more ambitious series called Britain in Pictures, edited by Walter J. Turner in which the illustrations were an integral part of a book, prominently placed together with the words to which they were related, rather than banishing them to the plates section elsewhere the book. The series combined skilful picture research with fine design and printing including significant texts from George Orwell (The English People), Rose Macaulay (Life among the English), John Piper (British Romantic Artists), Michael Ayrton (British Drawings), and Jacquetta Hawkes (Early Britain); the series eventually comprised more than 100 volumes.

Neurath was not yet a naturalised British citizen and was dispatched to an internment camp on the Isle of Man, alongside musicians later to become the Amadeus Quartet and other distinguished and blameless European artists and intellectuals viewed as enemy aliens. Happily, aware that the Britain in Pictures series had considerable propaganda value, a friendly civil servant, Richard Cowell, managed to get Neurath released rapidly and he was soon back at work, with eventual naturalization as a British subject to follow.

After World War II Neurath stayed with Adprint until September 1949 when he founded Thames and Hudson, contributing his life savings of £3000 to the new company's total capital of £7,000. His co-directors included his Adprint colleague Eva Feuchtwang, the printer John Jarrold and the process engraver Wilfrid Gilchrist. The publishing house was named after the rivers of London and New York, Thames and Hudson, to signify its ambition to publish on both sides of the Atlantic. However, the point was frequently missed in the business world and letters addressed to Mr Thames and Mr Hudson were often received.

Thames and Hudson went on to become one of the most important publishing houses in Europe over the next two decades, by publishing art books at readily affordable prices and being the first to foresee the rise of the quality original paperback. Its World of Art series in paperback fitted student budgets, and the best titles in the series, such as Michael Levey's From Giotto to Cézanne (1962), which had over 500 colour illustrations, went on student reading lists all over the world, in as many as twenty languages, and sold by the hundred thousand, having a powerful impact on international art education.

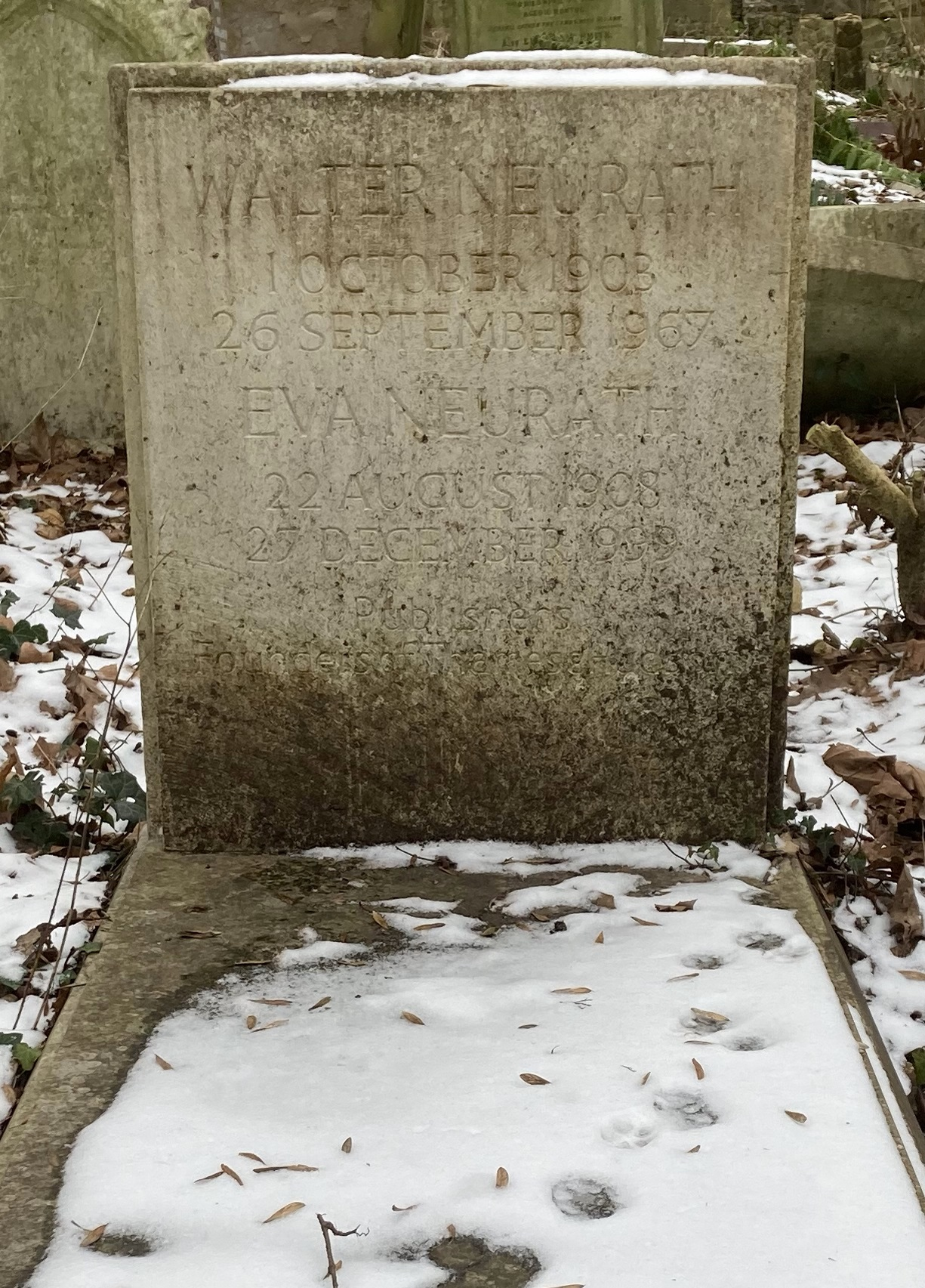
Grave of Walter and Eva Neurath in Highgate Cemetery (west side)

== Personal life ==
Neurath married three times, Lilly Kruk in 1925 (dissolved in 1933), then Marianne Müller (1909–1950) who was a schoolteacher, and on 6 August 1953 he married his longtime colleague at Adprint, Eva Urvasi Feuchtwang (1908–1999) who, as Eva Neurath, was also his full business partner and essential contributor to the success of Thames and Hudson. Together they built a holiday house in Tuscany, named Dolphin Villa after the emblem of the firm, whilst their London home was a fine 18th Century house in Highgate Village. Walter Neurath died on 26 September 1967 after fighting cancer for many months. His widow, Eva, became chairman, his son Thomas managing director, and his daughter Constance a director. He is buried with Eva in Highgate Cemetery.

After his death, Thames and Hudson endowed an annual Walter Neurath memorial lecture, first at Birkbeck College, University of London and then at the National Gallery. The lecture is a fitting memorial to one of the many German-speaking Jewish refugees who had such a deep influence on British cultural life. Neurath's native Austria honoured him with the Goldene Ehrenzeichen (the approximate equivalent of CBE), but his adopted Britain shamefully awarded no decoration. Neurath was a formidably scholarly and erudite man, and as Eric Hobsbawm said "there is no educated person in Britain with an interest in the arts who does not owe an enormous debt to the man who came from Vienna in 1938, who founded and directed the publishing house Thames and Hudson in 1949 and set it on the course which it still steers, thirty years after his death."
