= Jewish Communist Party in the Czechoslovak Republic =

The Jewish Communist Party in the Czechoslovak Republic was a short-lived political party in Czechoslovakia.

Following the July 1920 World Congress of the Poale Zion movement, the Poale Zion party in Czechoslovakia was split in 1920 with the left faction being led by Rudolf Kohn (Prague), Dr. Arthur Polak (Prague) and Felix Loria (Brno). In February 1921, the (Left) Poale Zion had accepted the 21 conditions of the Communist International.

The Left Poale Zion re-constituted itself as the 'Jewish Communist Party in the Czechoslovak Republic', at a congress held May 14–15, 1921. Kohn announced the formation of the Jewish Communist Party at the founding congress of the Communist Party of Czechoslovakia. The formation of the Jewish Communist Party marked a definitive break with Zionism for Kohn and his followers.

The Jewish Communist Party drew support from Jewish intellectuals and from the rural Jewish proletariat in eastern Slovakia and Subcarpathian Rus'. Most of the erstwhile Poale Zion members in Bratislava and Ružomberok had joined the party. In July 1921, a meeting organized by the party in Žofín, Prague was attended by some 120 persons.

The party published the monthly Der Funke ('The Spark') from Brno as its organ. The party merged into the Communist Party of Czechoslovakia at the October 30-November 3, 1921 unity congress. Der Funke continued to be published as the organ of the Jewish Section of the Communist Party of Czechoslovakia.
