= Thames & Hudson =

Publisher of illustrated books

- Founded: 1949
- Founders: Walter Neurath; Eva Neurath
- Country of origin: United Kingdom
- Headquarters location: High Holborn
- Distribution: Hachette UK Distribution (UK); W. W. Norton & Company (US); Alliance Distribution Services (Australia)
- Publication types: Books
- Official website: www.thamesandhudson.com

Thames & Hudson (sometimes T&H for brevity) is a publisher of illustrated books in all visually creative categories: art, architecture, design, photography, fashion, film, and the performing arts. It also publishes books on archaeology, history, and popular culture.

Headquartered in London, it has a sister company in New York City, and subsidiaries in Melbourne, Singapore, and Hong Kong. In Paris it has a sister company, Éditions Thames & Hudson, and a subsidiary called Interart which distributes English-language books. The Thames & Hudson group currently employs approximately 150 staff in London and approximately 65 more around the world.

The publishing company was founded in 1949 by Walter and Eva Neurath, who aimed to make the world of art and the research of top scholars available to a wider public. The company's name reflects its international presence, particularly in London and New York. It remains an independent, family-owned company, and is one of the largest publishers of illustrated books, with over 2,000 titles in print.

== History ==
Walter Neurath was born in Vienna in 1903, and ran an art gallery and published illustrated books there. In 1938, he left for London, where he initially worked as production director of Adprint, a London book-packaging company established by fellow Viennese émigré Wolfgang Foges. While at Adprint, Neurath designed and produced the hardback King Penguin Books, and developed the book series Britain in Pictures which integrated images with text rather than separating them into "plates" sections.

Neurath and Foges helped pioneer the concept of book packaging and co-edition publishing, in which books are conceived, commissioned, and produced, and then sold to publishers in different markets, countries, and languages, in order to create large print-runs and thereby lower costs.

Wishing to take book packaging and international publication further, and recognizing the need to defray the high production costs of illustrated books, in 1949 Neurath established his own publishing house, establishing offices in London and New York, and named the company Thames & Hudson to indicate it would publish in both British and North American markets, with reference to the River Thames and the Hudson River. Eva Feuchtwang (later Eva Neurath), who had arrived with her second husband in London from Berlin in 1939, was co-founder; she married Neurath in 1950 following the death of his wife. Neurath's stated intention with his new publishing company was to create a "museum without walls", a way of bringing art to the masses at a price they could afford.

Thames & Hudson published ten titles in its first year of 1950, including English Cathedrals with photographs by Martin Hürlimann, and Albert Einstein's Out of My Later Years.

Increasing the number of titles published year over year, by 1956 Thames & Hudson had outgrown its High Holborn offices and moved to Bloomsbury Street just off Bedford Square, which was at the time the centre of London book publishing. Remaining at that address for 43 years, it moved back to High Holborn in 1999.

In 1958, Thames & Hudson launched one of its best-known series, the World of Art. Pocket-sized and with black spines, the series grew to 49 titles within seven years, and has currently produced over 300 titles.

Other major series have included Ancient People and Places, edited by archaeologist Glyn Daniel, which eventually included over 100 titles, and the large-format Great Civilizations series, published from 1961, featuring contributions by Alan Bullock, Asa Briggs, Hugh Trevor-Roper, A. J. P. Taylor, John Julius Norwich and others.

Walter Neurath died in 1967 at the age of 63, and Eva Neurath became chairman of the company until her death in 1999. Walter's son Thomas (1940–2025), who with his sister Constance had joined the company in 1961, became managing director upon Walter's death. Constance later served as art director for several decades. Both Thomas and Constance sat on the company's board of directors, and as of 2025 Thomas's daughters Johanna and Susanna are on the board as well.

In 2023, Thames & Hudson acquired back catalogues and rights to future titles by two small independent British book publishers: Unit Editions, specializing in books about graphic design, and Read-Only Memory (ROM), focused on video game history.

== See also ==
- List of publishers
- Ian Mackenzie-Kerr (1929–2005), a book designer with T&H for nearly 50 years
- World of Art, Thames & Hudson's signature book series on the arts
