= Deštná (Jindřichův Hradec District) =

- Town
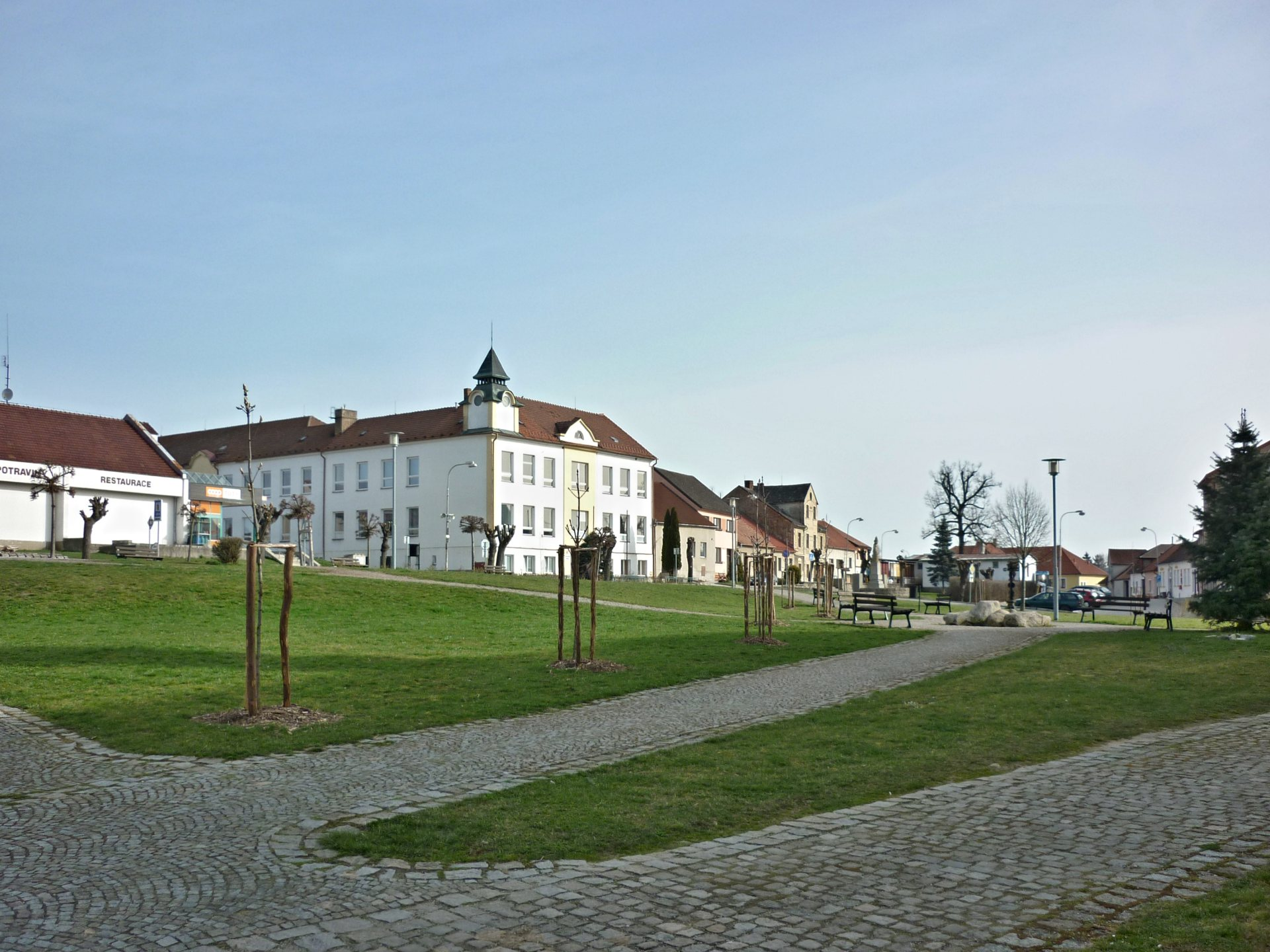
- Town square

- Flag Coat of arms

- Location in the Czech Republic
- Coordinates: 49°15′55″N 14°55′16″E
- Country: Czech Republic
- Region: South Bohemian
- District: Jindřichův Hradec
- First mentioned: 1294

Government
  - Mayor: David Šašek

Area
  - Total: 12.70 km^{2} (4.90 sq mi)
- Elevation: 520 m (1,710 ft)

Population (2026-01-01)
  - Total: 738
  - Density: 58.1/km^{2} (151/sq mi)
- Time zone: UTC+1 (CET)
  - Summer (DST): UTC+2 (CEST)
- Postal code: 378 25
- Website: www.destna.cz

Deštná (Czech pronunciation: [ˈdɛʃtnaː]; German: Deschna) is a town in Jindřichův Hradec District in the South Bohemian Region of the Czech Republic. It has about 700 inhabitants.

== Administrative division ==
Deštná consists of two municipal parts (in brackets population according to the 2021 census):

- Deštná (667)
- Lipovka (29)

== Etymology ==
The name was derived either from the Czech word déšť (i.e. 'rain'), which described a rainy landscape, or from the old Czech expression deščený, which denoted a forest made up of tall but not very branched trees.

== Geography ==
Deštná is located about 14 kilometres (9 mi) north of Jindřichův Hradec and 45 km (28 mi) northeast of České Budějovice. It lies in the Křemešník Highlands. The highest point is the hill Deštenská hora at 647 m (2,123 ft) above sea level. The stream Dírenský potok flows through the town. The municipal territory is rich in fishponds.

== History ==
The first written mention of Deštná is a donation deed of Oldřich of Hradec from 1294, when it was already a market town. In 1364, Lords of Hradec sold Deštná to the Rosenberg family, who annexed it to the Choustník estate. In 1418, Deštná was promoted to a town. With a short break in 1531–1538, the Rosenbergs owned Deštná until 1596, when they sold it to Vilém Ruth. He annexed the town to the Červená Lhota estate, which remained so until the establishment of an independent municipality in 1848. In 1774, Deštná was badly damaged by a large fire.

== Demographics ==
Historical population

Year	Pop.	±%
1869	1,653	—
1880	1,620	−2.0%
1890	1,550	−4.3%
1900	1,476	−4.8%
1910	1,393	−5.6%

Year	Pop.	±%
1921	1,321	−5.2%
1930	1,245	−5.8%
1950	967	−22.3%
1961	955	−1.2%
1970	800	−16.2%

Year	Pop.	±%
1980	685	−14.4%
1991	649	−5.3%
2001	664	+2.3%
2011	721	+8.6%
2021	696	−3.5%

Source: Censuses

== Transport ==
There are no railways or major roads running through the municipal territory.

== Sights ==
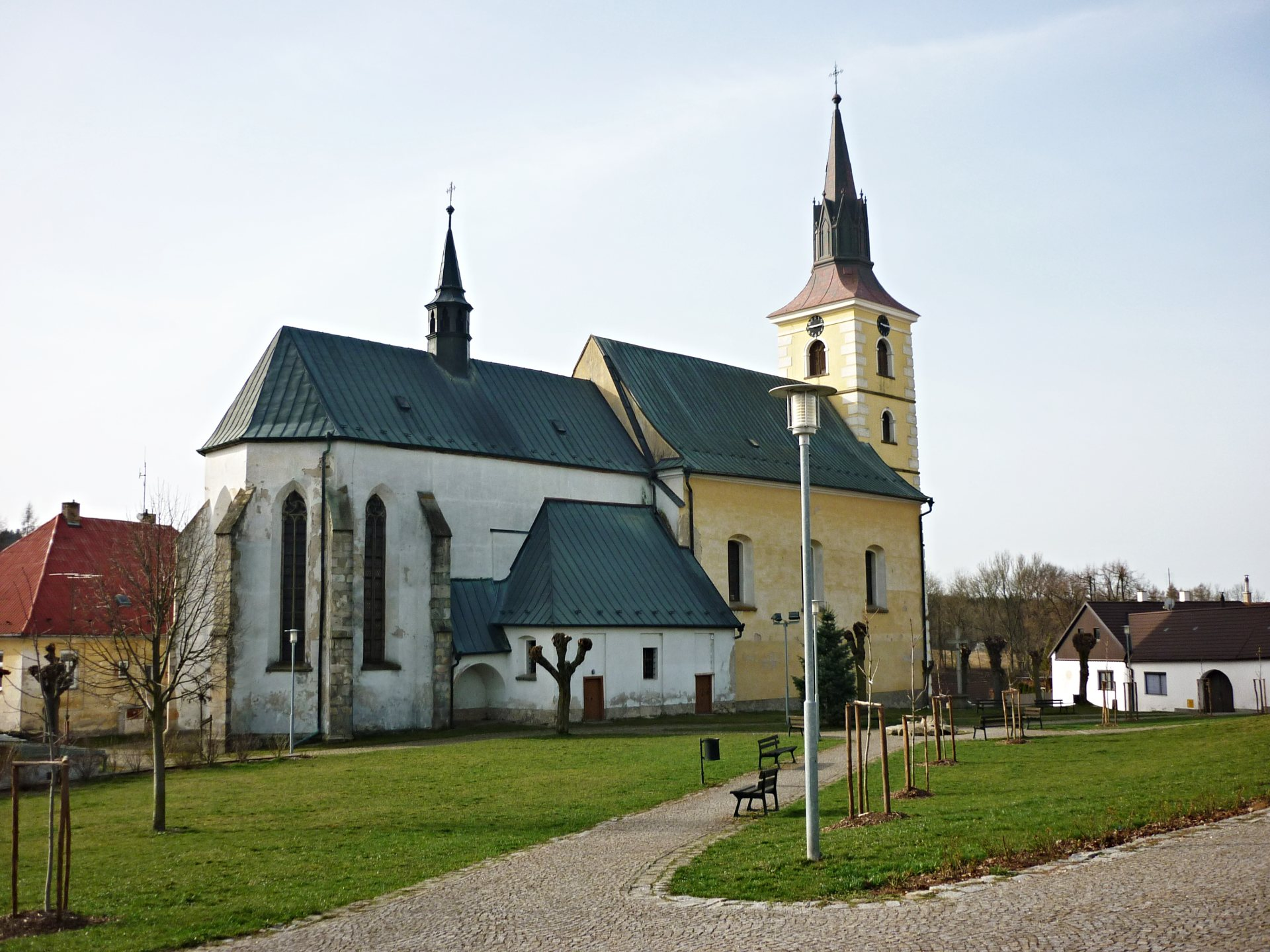
Church of Saint Otto

The main landmark of Deštná is the Church of Saint Otto. It was built by the Teutonic Order after 1255 and was extended in 1380. The tower was raised in 1687. In 1733, it was rebuilt in the Baroque style. It is the only church in the country dedicated to Saint Otto of Bamberg.

The Chapel of Saint John the Baptist is located on the outskirts of the town. It was built in the second quarter of the 17th century and rebuilt in the neo-Gothic style in the 18th and 19th centuries.

Among the tourist destinations are the Aviation Museum Deštná with exhibits about Czechoslovak RAF pilots in World War II, and Rope Museum of Karel Klik, which presents the rope-making craft.

== Notable people ==
- Carl Ditters von Dittersdorf (1739–1799), Austrian composer, violinist and silvologist; buried here
- Bohumil Jílek (1892–1963), politician
