= Franz Koritschoner =

Austrian communist politician

Franz Koritschoner

Franz Koritschoner (23 February 1892 – 9 June 1941) was an Austrian communist politician. Born in Vienna, Koritschoner was a leading figure of the Communist Party of Austria (KPÖ), and a member of its Central Committee until 1928. He translated the works of Lenin and edited the central party organ Die Rote Fahne.

Koritschoner was one of the organizers of the 1918 Austro-Hungarian January Strike, and was arrested after its resolution. He joined the Austrian Communist Party shortly after its foundation in 1918. In 1926, he went to Russia in order to work with the Profintern, and became a close associate of its leader Solomon Lozovsky. In 1930, he joined the Communist Party of the Soviet Union. In the wake of the Stalinist purges, he was arrested in 1937. In 1940, by decision of the Soviet Supreme Court, he was extradited to Nazi Germany. On June 7, 1941, he was deported to Auschwitz, where he was murdered two days later.

After Nikita Khrushchev's "Secret Speech" in 1956, Koritschoner was politically rehabilitated.

== See also ==
- Austria under Nazism
