= Alois Neurath =

Sudeten German dissident communist activist

Alois Neurath (29 August 1886 Vienna – 25 April 1955 Stockholm) was a Sudeten German dissident communist activist who later joined the Swedish Social Democratic Party.

Neurath was a founding member of the Communist Party of Czechoslovakia (German Division), becoming Party secretary in 1921. He also became a member of the Executive Committee of the Communist International where he supported Zinoviev.

In June 1929, following the emergence of the new party leadership under Klement Gottwald, he was expelled from the Communist Party of Czechoslovakia and joined a new parliamentary club called Communist Party of Czechoslovakia (Leninists).

He was married to Gisela Fröhlich (d. 1944). They had one son, Walter Neurath (1903–1967), the British publisher who co-founded Thames & Hudson.
