= Deštná (Blansko District) =

- Municipality
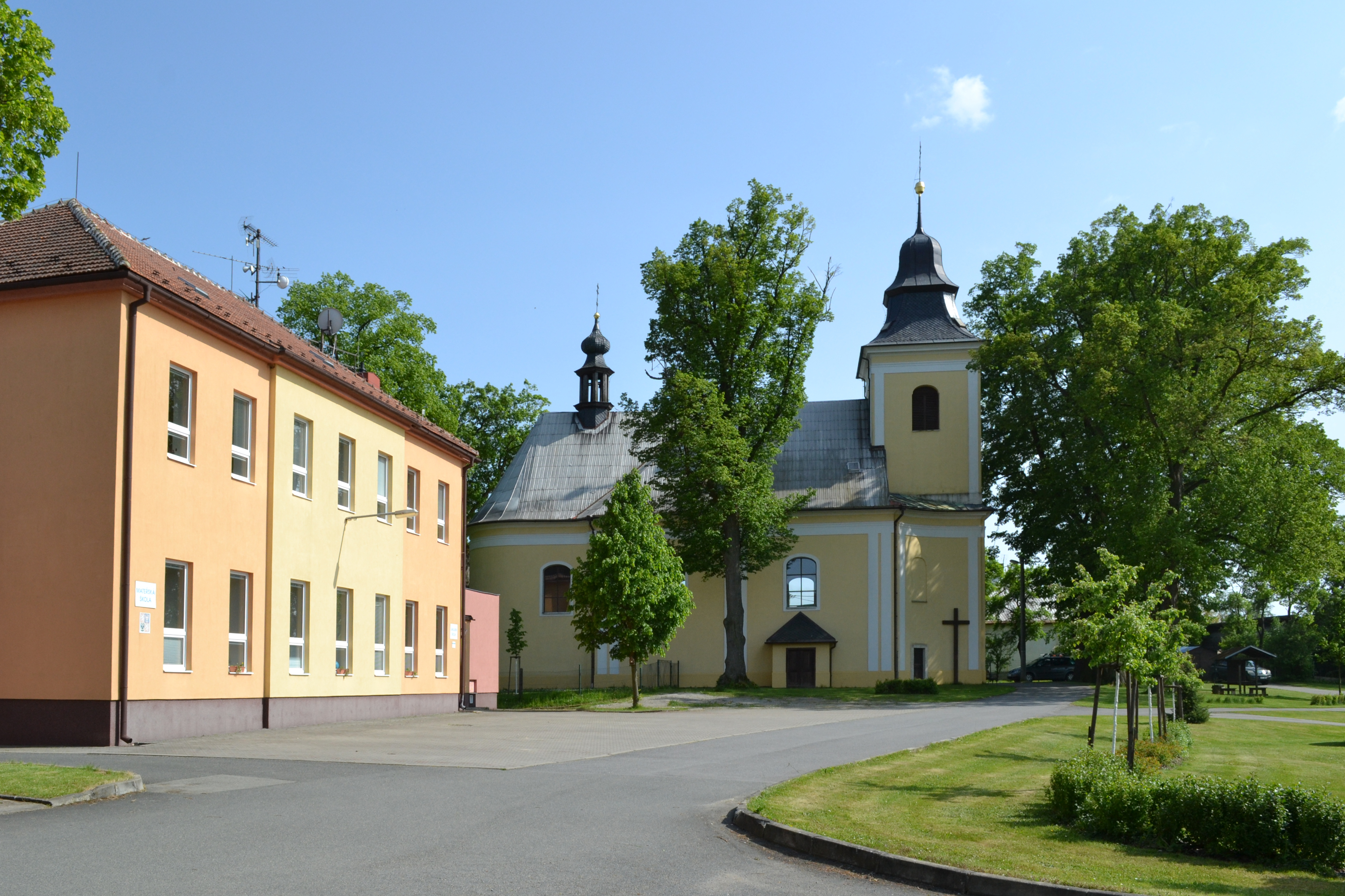
- Church of Saints Peter and Paul

- Flag Coat of arms

- Location in the Czech Republic
- Coordinates: 49°36′45″N 16°33′49″E
- Country: Czech Republic
- Region: South Moravian
- District: Blansko
- First mentioned: 1317

Area
  - Total: 3.29 km^{2} (1.27 sq mi)
- Elevation: 442 m (1,450 ft)

Population (2026-01-01)
  - Total: 218
  - Density: 66.3/km^{2} (172/sq mi)
- Time zone: UTC+1 (CET)
  - Summer (DST): UTC+2 (CEST)
- Postal code: 679 61
- Website: www.obecdestna.cz

Deštná is a municipality and village in Blansko District in the South Moravian Region of the Czech Republic. It has about 200 inhabitants.

Deštná lies approximately 29 kilometres (18 mi) north of Blansko, 47 km (29 mi) north of Brno, and 162 km (101 mi) east of Prague.

== Administrative division ==
Deštná consists of two municipal parts (in brackets population according to the 2021 census):

- Deštná (154)
- Rumberk (69)

== Demographics ==
Historical population
Year	Pop.	±%
1869	328	—
1880	367	+11.9%
1890	375	+2.2%
1900	390	+4.0%
1910	411	+5.4%
1921	375	−8.8%
1930	403	+7.5%
1950	315	−21.8%
1961	276	−12.4%
1970	273	−1.1%
1980	272	−0.4%
1991	217	−20.2%
2001	239	+10.1%
2011	208	−13.0%
2021	223	+7.2%
Source: Censuses
