= Alois Muna =

Czechoslovak politician

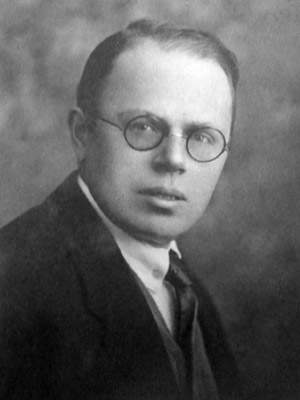
Alois Muna

Alois Muna, also Alois Můňa (23 February 1886, Lysice – 2 August 1943, Kladno), was a Czechoslovak politician and one of the founders and interwar period general secretary of the Communist Party of Czechoslovakia.
