= German Social Democratic Workers' Party in the Czechoslovak Republic =

German Social Democratic Workers' Party in the Czechoslovak Republic Deutsche sozialdemokratische Arbeiterpartei in der Tschechoslowakischen Republik
- Leader: Josef Seliger; Ludwig Czech; Wenzel Jaksch
- Founded: 1919
- Dissolved: 1939
- Split from: SDPÖ
- Ideology: German minority interests Social democracy Democratic socialism Activism
- Political position: Centre-left to left-wing
- International affiliation: Labour and Socialist International

The German Social Democratic Workers' Party in the Czechoslovak Republic, (Note: German: Deutsche sozialdemokratische Arbeiterpartei in der Tschechoslowakischen Republik; Czech: Německá sociálně demokratická strana dělnická v Československé republice) or DSAP, was a German social democratic party in Czechoslovakia, founded when the Bohemian provincial organization of the Social Democratic Workers' Party of Austria separated itself from the mother party. The founding convention was held in Teplice from 30 August – 3 September 1919; the first leader of the party was Josef Seliger.

In the First Czechoslovak Republic, DSAP was the most important German party, aiming to give the German population a place in the republic. At first the party's leadership was politically and socially radical; the Czechoslovak State was regarded as a "creation of Allied Imperialism" and the Czechoslovak Constitution as the "suicide of democracy". However, these politics changed shortly thereafter as the radical left-wing, led by Karl Kreibich, left the party for the Communist Party of Czechoslovakia in October 1920. The number of members fell dramatically from 1921 to 1926, from 120,000 to 60,000. Unlike right-wing German parties, the DSAP accepted Jews as members, and nominated Jewish candidates for office.

Some leading members of the party started talks with President Masaryk, who tried to persuade the party to join the government. It finally agreed in 1929, when its leader Ludwig Czech became Minister of Public Affairs.

During the years of the great economic crisis, the party lost many of its Sudeten German supporters, and the Sudeten German Party (SdP) gained importance. After the Munich Agreement, when the troops of Nazi Germany began occupying the Sudeten areas (on 1 October 1938), only some of the anti-Nazi opposition members could retreat into the remaining Czechoslovak territories. Immediately after the entry of the Nazi troops, the persecution of Social Democrats and other opponents of Nazism began. From October to December 1938, 20,000 members of the Social Democratic Party were arrested; 2,500 anti-Nazi Sudeten Germans were sent to the Dachau concentration camp alone. Around 30,000 people managed to flee to the West. On 22 February 1939 the DSAP leadership decided to cease all activities in the Czechoslovak Republic and continue working abroad as "Treuegemeinschaft sudetendeutscher Sozialdemokraten". The group began publishing the monthly bulletin Sudeten-Freiheit from Oslo.

The party was a member of the Labour and Socialist International between 1923 and 1938.

== See also ==
- Category:German Social Democratic Workers' Party in the Czechoslovak Republic politicians
