= Vorwärts (Czechoslovak newspaper) =

Vorwärts ('Forward') was a communist newspaper published from Liberec, Czechoslovakia. The newspaper was founded in 1911, replaced the previous social democratic organ in the area, Freigeist. It served the German-language organ of the Communist Party of Czechoslovakia. The frequency of publishing shifted, but the newspaper was a daily for most of the time between 1931 and 1933. The newspaper was banned by the Czechoslovak government in September 1933.
