= David Feuchtwang =

Jewish scholar and author (1864–1936)

David Feuchtwang (27 November 1864 – 6 July 1936) was a Jewish scholar and author, and chief rabbi of Vienna from 1933 until his death in 1936.

David Feuchtwang was born in Nikolsburg, Moravia (now Mikulov, Czech Republic) on 27 November 1864, the son of Mayer Feuchtwang, who was rabbi of Nikolsburg from 1861 to 1888. He had five children.
