= Bohumír Šmeral =

Czech communist politician

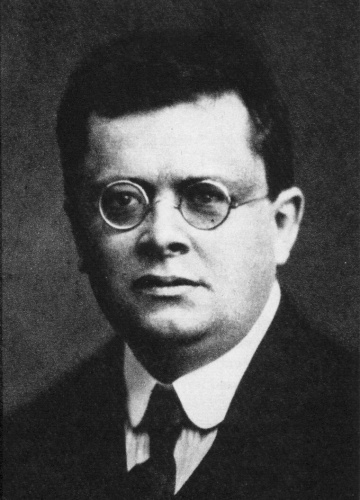
- Born: 25 October 1880; Třebíč, Austria-Hungary
- Died: 8 May 1941 (aged 60); Moscow, Russian SFSR, Soviet Union
- Occupations: Politician, journalist and writer

Bohumír Šmeral (25 October 1880 – 8 May 1941) was a Czech politician, leader of the Czech Social Democratic Party, and one of the founders of the Communist Party of Czechoslovakia.

== Early life ==
Šmeral was born into a relatively well to-do family in a small town. While studying at the gymnasium in Třebíč he joined the local wing of the Czech Social Democratic Party. During 1898–1904 he studied law at the Charles University in Prague and actively engaged in politics. Since 1899 he also worked as a journalist in the party newspaper Právo lidu and as a public speaker. He also published several theoretical works.

== Political career ==
Being able, outspoken and hard working, Šmeral was elected to the executive committee of social democracy (in 1909) and into the parliament of Austria (Reichsrat), in 1911. According to historian Jan Galandauer he was the most competent politician among Czech social democrats.

During World War I Šmeral became head of social democracy. He advocated federalization of Austria-Hungary as the best way to achieve the goals of the worker's movement and argued against creation of small national states. As the war dragged on and faith in the monarchy vanished, the other leaders of the party grew discontented. During September 1917, Gustav Habrman, František Soukup, František Tomášek, Rudolf Bechyně and others criticized Šmeral for his pro-Austrian stance and forced him to resign.

After 28 October 1918, when Czechoslovakia was established, he refused to participate in politics of the new state and until the end of 1919 worked as a correspondent of Právo lidu in Switzerland.

During the spring of 1920, Šmeral visited Soviet Russia where he discussed the future directions of the left movement in Czechoslovakia with V. I. Lenin. After his return, he led the left wing of Social Democracy, preparing for the creation of the communist party and participated in work of the Comintern. In May 1921 he co-founded, together with Antonín Zápotocký, the Communist Party of Czechoslovakia (KSČ) and served in its executive committee (later named the central committee, ÚV KSČ).

Šmeral was criticized as too moderate and for "social democratism" by radicals. He worked as an executive of the Comintern from 1926, most of the time outside Czechoslovakia. During the 1930s he organized anti-fascist movements. In September 1938, after the Sudetenland Crisis resulted in the Munich Agreement, he left for Moscow and joined the exiled leadership (zahraniční vedení) of the KSČ (soon banned in Nazi-occupied Czechoslovakia).

In November 1938 he went to Moscow, where he died on 8 May 1941.

== Selected works ==
- Kdo jsou a co chtějí sociální demokraté [Social Democrats: Who They Are And What They Want] (1906)
- Materálie k dějinám dělnického hnutí [Historical Materials About Worker's Movement] (1906)
- Pravda o sovětském Rusku [The Truth About Soviet Russia] (1920)
