= Mauvais =

Mauvais may refer to:

== People with the surname ==
- Léon Mauvais (1902–1980), French trade unionist and senator of France from the Seine
- Victor Mauvais (1809–1854), French politician

== Geography ==
- Mauvaise River, a tributary of the Bras du Nord in Saint-Raymond, Quebec, Canada

== See also ==
- Mauvais noir (disambiguation), a name for a few varieties of wine grapes
