= Jacques Sadoul =

Jacques Sadoul may refer to:

- Jacques Sadoul (writer) (1934-2013)
- Jacques Sadoul (politician) (1881-1956)
