= French Communist Group =

The French Communist Group was a small organization of French residents in Russia, founded in Moscow in October 1918. One of the founders, Jacques Sadoul, had been a French infantry soldier in Russia during World War I but had joined the Red Army and became an organized communist.

Prominent members of the French Communist Group included Jacques Sadoul, Pierre Pascal, Suzanne Girault and Henri Guilbeaux.

The group was affiliated to the Federation of Foreign Groups of the Russian Communist Party (Bolsheviks). Although the organization was small, it was able to play an important role in educational work that enabled mutinies amongst French interventionist troops in Russia in 1919.

The French Communist Group published the weekly newspaper La Troisième Internationale between October 1918 and March 1919. The newspaper had as its stated goal to promote "the enlightenment of the workers of France, Belgium and Switzerland about the Russian Revolution; agitation among French soldiers at the front in Russia, the organization of French, Belgian and Swiss workers living in Russia."

The group was represented by Jacques Sadoul at the founding congress of the Communist International in March 1919. Sadoul participated as a consultative delegate.

The group was torn apart by internal differences and squabbles between Guilbeaux and Sadoul. Victor Serge, who used to assist the meetings of the group in 1920 and 1921, described it as a "little nest of vipers".

One of the members of the group, the school teacher Jeanne Labourbe, was executed by French troops in Odessa in 1919. Labourbe would be iconized as a communist martyr.

Suzanne Girault, who would later become a leading figure in the French Communist Party, became the secretary of the French Communist Group in Kiev in 1919.
