= Sadoul =

Sadoul is a French surname. Notable people with the surname include:

- Georges Sadoul (1904–1967), French journalist and cinema writer
- Numa Sadoul (born 1947), French writer, actor, and director
- Jacques Sadoul (writer) (1934–2013), French author
- Jacques Sadoul (politician) (1881–1956), French communist politician
