= La Nouvelle Internationale =

Defunct Swiss newspaper

- Type: Weekly newspaper
- Founder(s): Charles Hubacher and Henri Guilbeaux
- Founded: May 1, 1917
- Ceased publication: April 1921
- City: Geneva
- Country: Switzerland

La Nouvelle Internationale (transl. The New International') was a weekly newspaper published from Geneva, Switzerland between May 1, 1917 and April 1921. The newspaper was founded by Charles Hubacher and Henri Guilbeaux as a successor of Le Peuple suisse. La Nouvelle Internationale was based on the principles of the Zimmerwald Left. It carried the byline 'Newspaper of the internationalist socialist workers'. Apart from Hubacher, another notable editor was Ernest Brunner. On May 1, 1921 La nouvelle internationale was superseded by L'Avant-Garde.
