= Raphaël Lévy (disambiguation) =

Raphaël Lévy may refer to:

- Raphaël Lévy, professional player of Magic: The Gathering, a trading card game
- Raphael Levy (died 1670), Jewish martyr
- Raphaël-Georges Lévy (1853–1933), French banker, economist and politician
