= The Founding Myths of Modern Israel =

1996 book by Roger Garaudy

Les Mythes fondateurs de la politique israélienne
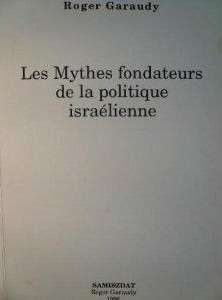
- Author: Roger Garaudy
- Language: French
- Publication date: 1996
- English publication date: 2000

Les Mythes fondateurs de la politique israélienne (The Founding Myths of Modern Israel) is a book published in 1996 by French philosopher Roger Garaudy. His most controversial work, Les Mythes was translated into English in 2000 by the Institute for Historical Review. The work was determined under French Law to be "racial libel".

== Premises of state legitimacy ==
In his book, Garaudy rejected many of the premises of the Jewish claim to a homeland in the Levant and to the legitimacy of the state of Israel as "myths," e.g., the "theological myths" of the Bible; the twentieth century "myth of Zionist anti-Fascism"; the "myth of justice at Nuremberg," the "myth of the six million," and the "myth of the land without a people for a people without a land." These and other myths, Garaudy's book argued, had been used by world Zionists in a conspiracy to dispossess the Palestinians of their homeland.

== Gayssot Law ==
Under France's 1990 Gayssot Law, which prohibits the questioning of the existence of the category of crimes against humanity as defined in the London Charter of 1945, several of Garaudy's assertions, in particular, his claim that the Holocaust was a myth, were deemed to be illegal. Garaudy's trial began in 1996 and he was convicted in 1998. The court ruled that the chapters entitled "The Myth of the Nuremberg Trials and The Myth of the Holocaust" in the first edition, constituted "Holocaust denial" by writing of "the myth of the six million" Jewish victims.

== Further ban ==
French courts banned further publication of Garaudy's book and on February 27, 1998 fined him 240,000 French Francs (about $40,000) and sentenced him to a suspended jail sentence of several years. The decision of the court provoked a debate about freedom of speech in France and Europe and some claimed the verdict was a political one. Garaudy appealed this decision to the European Court of Human Rights, but his appeal was rejected as inadmissible.

== See also ==
- The Holocaust Industry (by Norman Finkelstein)
- David Irving
- Armenian genocide and the Holocaust
- The Protocols of the Elders of Zion
- The Holocaust and the Nakba
- Nakba Law
- Hamas–UNRWA Holocaust dispute
- General Jewish Labour Bund
- Temple denial
- Historical revisionism

== Bibliography ==
- Goetz Nordbruch, “The Socio-historical Background of Holocaust Denial in Arab Countries: Arab reactions to Roger Garaudy's 'The Founding Myths of Israeli Politics',” Acta, No 17, 2001.
- Michaël Prazan and Adrien Minard, Roger Garaudy, itinéraire d'une négation, Paris: Calmann-Lévy, 2007.
