= Suzanne Girault =

French politician (1882–1973)

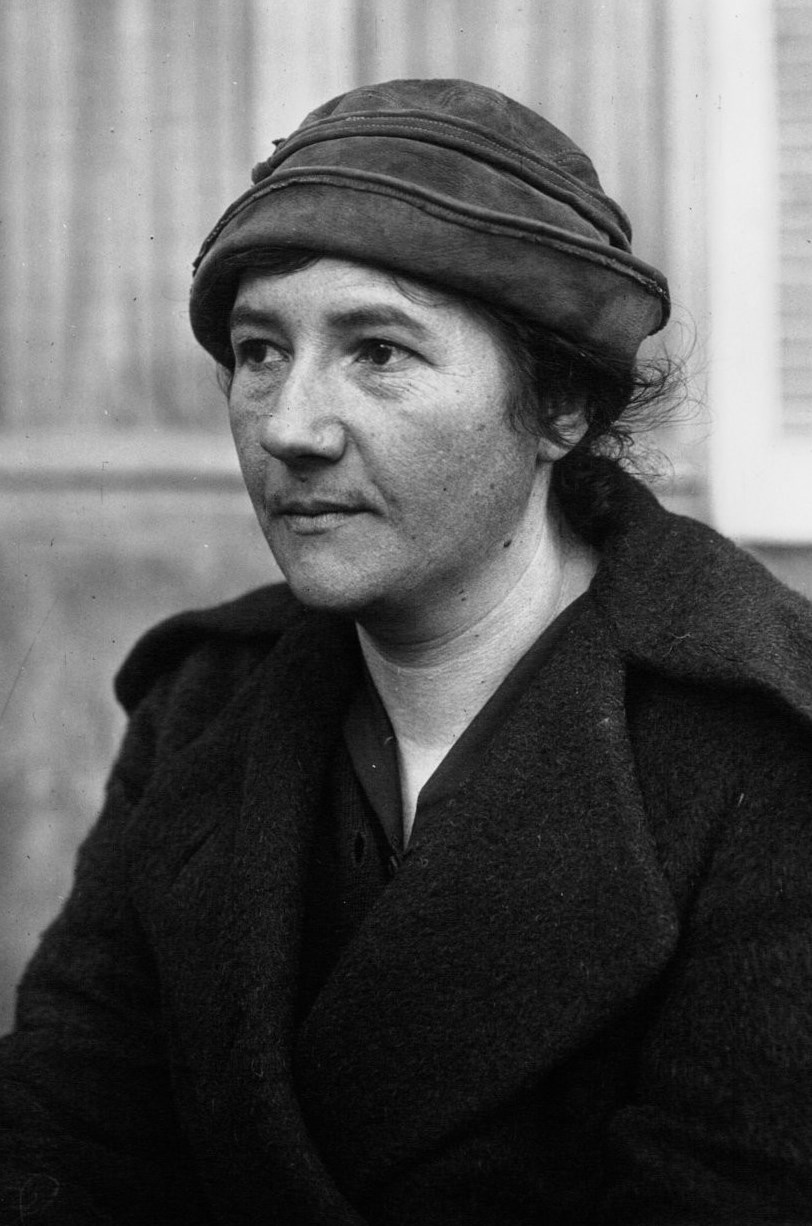
- Girault in 1921

Senator of Seine
- In office 1946–1958

Personal details
- Born: Suzanne Depollier; 28 July 1882 La Chaux-de-Fonds, Switzerland
- Died: 20 September 1973 (aged 91) Paris, France

Suzanne Girault (28 July 1882 – 20 September 1973) was a Swiss-born French politician. From 1923 to 1925, with Albert Treint, she was one of the main leaders of the French Communist Party. She served in the French Senate from 1946 to 1958 as a member of the Communist Party.

She was born Suzanne Depollier in La Chaux-de-Fonds. She was officially the daughter of François Dépollier and Louise Tissot-Daguerre, but her biological father, who also would raise her, was Auguste Spichiger, a Swiss watchmaker and anarchist. She left Switzerland for Moscow in the winter of 1899. She worked as a teacher there. She subsequently married a Russian Nicolas Frenkel and settled in Odessa; the couple had two children. At the start of World War I, the family moved to Kiev. During the October Revolution, she worked with the Bolshevik party without actually becoming a member. She joined the French Communist Group in Moscow and worked as a translator for the Communist International. She also was personal secretary for Angelica Balabanoff.

In the early 1920s, she was sent to France. She became a leader of the Seine Federation of the French Communist Party, serving until she was removed by Joseph Stalin in 1926. She remained head of the Women's Commission.

From 1946 to 1958, she was senator for the Seine department. She did not run for reelection in 1958.

In 1967, she was awarded the Order of the Red Banner by the Soviet government.

Girault died in Paris at the age of 91.
