= Roger Garaudy =

French philosopher and politician (1913–2012)

Senator for Seine
- In office 26 April 1959 – 31 October 1962

Member of the National Assembly for Seine
- In office 2 January 1956 – 8 December 1958

Member of the National Assembly for Tarn
- In office 21 October 1945 – 4 July 1951

Personal details
- Born: 17 July 1913 Marseille, France
- Died: 13 June 2012 (aged 98) Chennevières-sur-Marne, France
- Party: French Communist Party (1933–1970)
- Awards: King Faisal International Prize

Roger Garaudy (French: [ʁɔʒe gaʁodi]; 17 July 1913 – 13 June 2012) was a French philosopher, French resistance fighter and a communist author. He converted to Islam in 1982.

== Early life and education ==
Roger Garaudy was born in Marseille to working class Catholic parents. At the age of 14, Garaudy converted to Protestantism. He fought during World War II and received the Croix de Guerre. After a period as a prisoner of war of Vichy France in Algeria, Garaudy joined the French Resistance working for resistance radio and the newspaper Liberté.

== Political career ==
Garaudy joined the French Communist Party in 1933. By the mid-1940s, Garaudy was considered a leading polemicist within the party. He rose through the ranks and in 1945 he became a member of the party's leadership and its Central Executive Committee, where he occupied positions for 28 years.

Garaudy remained a Christian and eventually re-converted to Catholicism during his political career. Eventually he converted to Islam. He was befriended by one of France's most prominent clerics of the time, the Abbé Pierre, who in later years supported Garaudy, even regarding the latter's most controversial views.

Garaudy was expelled from the Communist Party in 1970, because he had criticized the party's position on the student movement and the Warsaw Pact invasion of Czechoslovakia. His philosophical and political views were characterized as revisionist by Soviet commentators. He had, however, accepted the invasion of Hungary in 1956.

== Academic career ==
He obtained a state doctorate in philosophy in 1953, with a dissertation discussing theory of knowledge and materialism, entitled La théorie matérialiste de la connaissance. In May 1954, Garaudy defended another doctoral thesis, The Problem of Freedom and Necessity in the Light of Marxism, at the Institute of Philosophy, Russian Academy of Sciences.

Garaudy lectured in the faculty of arts department of the University of Clermont-Ferrand from 1962 to 1965. Due to controversies between Garaudy and Michel Foucault, Garaudy left. He later taught in Poitiers from 1969 to 1972.

His main research subject was foundations of revolutionary politics.

== Political and philosophical views ==
As of 1940s, Garaudy was critical of Jean-Paul Sartre's view of freedom, maintaining that it lacks any social, economic, political or historical context. He criticized Being and Nothingness for what he deemed not going beyond the domain of metaphysical pathology, and Sartre's novels for "depicting only degenerates and human wrecks" and describing his existentialism as "a sickness".

Garaudy's faith in communism was shaken in 1956, after Nikita Khrushchev made the Secret Speech at the 20th Congress of the Communist Party of the Soviet Union. Afterwards, he espoused an eclectic and humanist view on Marxism, strictly opposing the theoretical Marxism of Louis Althusser and advocating dialogue with other schools of thought.

In 1974, Frederic Will described him as sympathetic towards Pierre Teilhard de Chardin and Gabriel Marcel. He held that the Western culture was something of a coalition between the idealistic philosophy and the elite class, which is devoted to turning man away from the material world. The goal of socialism in his view was not simply economic or providing social justice, but also giving each individual their personal chances for creativity.

=== Conversion to Islam ===
Around 1980, Garaudy read The Green Book by Muammar Gaddafi and became interested in Libya and Islam, meeting the country's leader on several occasions in the desert. He converted formally at the Islamic Centre in Geneva, an organisation managed by the Kingdom of Saudi Arabia at the time.

In The Case of Israel: A Study of Political Zionism (1983), Garaudy portrays Zionism as an isolationist and segregationist ideology that not only depends on antisemitism to nourish it, but also willfully encourages it to achieve its goals.

== Holocaust denial ==
=== Conviction of violating Gayssot Act ===
In 1996, Garaudy published, with his editor Pierre Guillaume, the work Les Mythes fondateurs de la politique israelienne (literally, The Founding Myths of Israeli Politics), later translated into English as The Founding Myths of Modern Israel. In the book he wrote of "the myth of the six million" Jewish victims of the Holocaust. Because of this breach of French law concerning Holocaust denial, the courts banned any further publication and on 27 February 1998 fined Garaudy 120,000 French francs. He was sentenced to a suspended jail sentence of several years.

=== Garaudy v. France ===
Garaudy appealed this decision to the European Court of Human Rights, stating that his book was a political work criticizing the policies of Israel that did not deny that the Nazis had committed crimes against humanity, and that his freedom of expression was interfered by the French courts. At his hearing, Garaudy stated that his book in no way condoned National Socialist methods, and that book was an attack on the mythologizing and use of the Holocaust by the Israeli government as policy. He argued that his book dealt with the Israeli government's use of the Holocaust as a "justifying dogma" for its actions, mainly in Palestine and toward Palestinians.

His appeal was rejected as inadmissible. The ECHR ruled that Garaudy had denied historical facts in his book which is not a research work. It also argued that the interference pursued two of the legitimate aims included in Gayssot Act articles and is not a violation of Garaudy's right for free speech. The ECHR did not use this rationale in Perinçek v. Switzerland.

=== Iranian support ===
In Iran, 160 members of the parliament and 600 journalists signed a petition in Garaudy's support. On 20 April 1998, Iran's Supreme Leader Ayatollah Ali Khamenei met Garaudy. Khamenei was critical of the West which, he said, condemned "the racist behavior of the Nazis" while accepting the Zionists’ "Nazi-like behavior." Iranian president, Akbar Hashemi Rafsanjani, insisted in a sermon delivered on Iranian radio that Hitler "only killed 20,000 Jews and not six million" and that "Garaudy's crime derives from the doubt he cast on Zionist propaganda." Iranian President, Mohammad Khatami, described Garaudy in 1998 as "a thinker" and "a believer" who was brought to trial merely for publishing research which was "displeasing to the West."

In December 2006, Garaudy was unable to attend the International Conference to Review the Global Vision of the Holocaust in Tehran, Iran owing to ill health. He reportedly sent a videotaped message supporting Iranian President Mahmoud Ahmadinejad's view that Israel should cease to exist.

== Death and legacy ==
Roger Garaudy died in Chennevières-sur-Marne, Val-de-Marne, on Wednesday 13 June 2012, aged 98.

According to Azzam Tamimi, Tunisian thinker Rached Ghannouchi was inspired by Garaudy in the early 1980s, after he read a translation of his book on women. He subsequently authored a treatise on women rights and on the status of women in the Islamic movement, partly influenced by Garaudy's work.

== Awards and honours ==
- Croix de Guerre
- Médaille de la déportation et de l'internement pour faits de Résistance
- King Faisal International Prize for Services to Islam (1986), jointly with Ahmed Deedat
- Prix Kadhafi des droits de l'homme (2002)

== Bibliography ==
The author of more than 70 books, some his translated works include:

- Literature of the Graveyard: Jean-Paul Sartre, François Mauriac, André Malraux, Arthur Koestler, New York, International Publishers, 1948.
- Marxism and Religion, Australian Left Review, 1949.
- Dieu est mort; étude sur Hegel. Internet Archive. Paris, Presses universitaires de France. 1962.
- La Pensée de Hegel. --. Internet Archive. [Paris] Bordas. 1966.
- Science and Faith in Teilhard de Chardin, in collaboration with Claude Cuenot, Garnstone Press, 1967.
- Karl Marx: The Evolution of his Thought, International Publishers, 1967, Greenwood Press, 1967, Lawrence & Wishart, 1967.
- From Anathema to Dialogue: The Challenge of Marxist-Christian Cooperation, Collins, 1967.
- From Anathema to Dialogue: A Marxist Challenge to the Christian Churches, Vintage, 1968.
- A Christian-Communist Dialogue: Exploration for Co-operation between a Marxist and a Christian, in collaboration with Quentin Lauer, S.J., New York: Doubleday, 1968.
- Marxism in the Twentieth Century, HarperCollins Distribution Services, 1970, Charles Scribner's Sons, 1970, Collins, 1970.
- The Crisis in Communism: The Turning Point of Socialism, Grove Press, 1970.
- The Turning Point of Socialism, New York: HarperCollins Distribution Services, 1970, London: Fontana, 1970.
- Socialism's Unanswered Questions: Europe 1968, Sydney, Australian Left Review, 1970.
- The Whole Truth, Fontana, 1971.
- The Alternative Future: A Vision of Christian Marxism, Simon & Schuster, 1974.
- God, Marx, and the Future: Dialogue with Roger Garaudy, in collaboration with Russell Bradner Norris, Fortress Press, c. 1974.
- Karl Marx: Evolution of his Thought, Greenwood Press, 1976, Praeger, 1977, ABC-CLIO, 1977.
- The Case of Israel: A Study of Political Zionism, Shorouk International, 1983.
- Mosquée, miroir de l'Islam, The Mosque, Mirror of Islam, Editions du Jaguar, 1985.
- The Founding Myths of Israeli Politics, published by Aaargh, 1996.
- The Mythical Foundations of Israeli Policy, Studies Forum International, 1997.

== See also ==
- Paul Rassinier
