= Jeanne Labourbe =

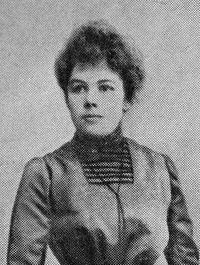
- Born: 8 April 1877; Lapalisse
- Died: 2 March 1919 (41 years old); Odessa
- Resting place: 2nd Christian Cemetery in Odessa
- Occupation: Politician

Jeanne Marie Labourbe (8 April 1877 — 2 March 1919) was a French Bolshevik and activist who participated in the October Revolution. She died in 1919 in Odessa, executed by the police as ordered by the White Russians.

== Early life ==
Jeanne Labourbe was born in Lapalisse, a small town South-East of Allier, where she worked from a young age at a laundry. Her father, Claude Labourbe, and her mother, Marie Labbé, had 5 children together, of which Jeanne was the third.

Since the bloody uprising of Lapalisse against the coup d'état of 1851, a strong feeling of republicanism and social justice was deep rooted in the region. It was the incredible political commitment of Louis-Simon Dereure, one of the first leaders of the International Workingmen's Association and a member of the Paris Commune, that inspired Labourbe's political trajectory.

== Career ==
In 1894, aged 17, Labourbe found a job offer to be a French reader in Poland, which was still a part of the Russian Empire at the time. She decided to leave for Poland and was hired as a governess and French reader for a Polish family from Tomaszów Mazowiecki. After several years, she became a teacher and joined the Russian Social Democratic Labour Party at the time of the 1905 Russian Revolution. In 1917, she participated in the October Revolution and, on 30 August 1918, she founded the French Communist Group in Moscow alongside Jacques Sadoul, Pierre Pascal and Inessa Armand.

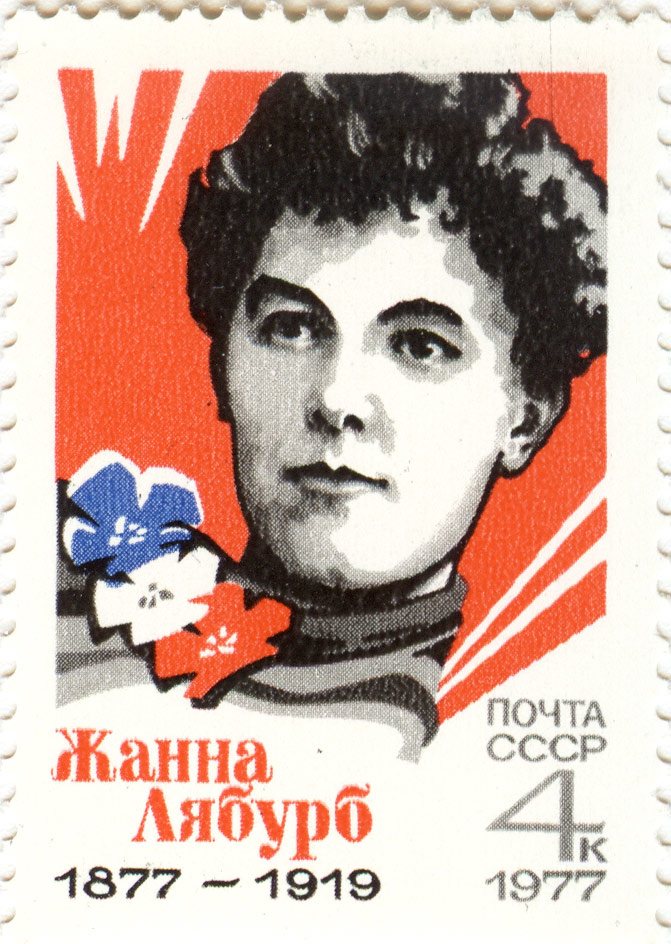
Soviet stamp commemorating the 100th anniversary of the birth of Jeanne Labourbe.

Georges Clemenceau, supporting the ideals of the Russian counter-revolutionaries, sent a squadron of the French maritime fleet to Odessa, looking to militarily suppress the spread of mutinies in the Black Sea. When Jeanne Labourbe found out about the landings, 18 December 1918, she volunteered to help the port city in a policy of propaganda and defence of the Bolshevik Revolution. In particular, she published a Le Communiste newsletter, written in French, directed at the French forces. However, despite their efforts, the city of Odessa fell to the influence of the White Russians. The police raided a Bolshevik committee meeting, 2 March 1919, which was attended by Labourbe, and opened fire on the ten militants present, who were tortured and executed.

== Tributes ==
Several French cities have named a street of theirs "Jeanne Labourbe"; to name some, Lapalisse, Saint-Pierre-des-Corps, Fleury-les-Aubrais, Vierzon, Varennes-Vauzelles, Saint-Martin-d'Hères, Tremblay-en-France, Lanester, Montluçon, Fontaine, Saran and Vénissieux.

She features in a 1965 Russian language film Eskadra ukhodit na zapad (The Squadron turns West) from the Soviet Union directed by Miron Bilinskiy.
