= List of senators of Seine =

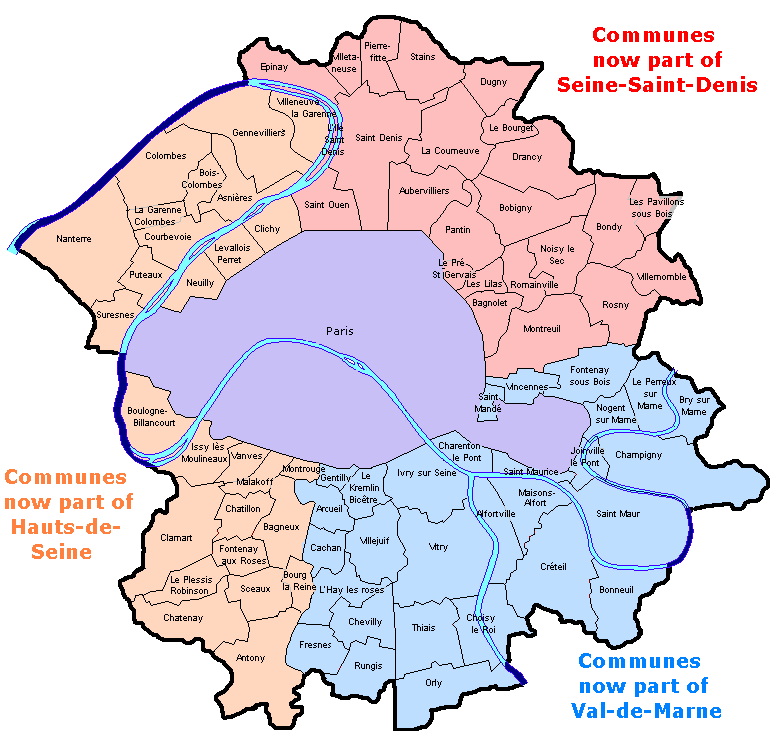
Seine department as it existed between 1929 and 1968

Following is a List of senators of Seine, people who have represented the department of Seine in the Senate of France. The Seine and Seine-et-Oise departments were combined and then broken into smaller departments in 1968.

== Third Republic ==
Senators for Seine under the French Third Republic were:

- Ferdinand Hérold (1876–1882)
- Victor Hugo (1876–1885)
- Alphonse Peyrat (1876–1890)
- Henri Tolain (1876–1897)
- Charles de Freycinet (1876–1920)
- Jean Labordère (1882–1884)
- Jacques Songeon (1885–1889)
- Georges Martin (1885–1891)
- François Poirrier (1889–1917)
- René Goblet (1891–1893)
- Arthur Ranc (1891–1900)
- Alexandre Lefèvre (1891–1914)
- Charles Floquet (1894–1896)
- Désiré Barodet (1896–1900)
- Paul Strauss (1897–1936)
- Alfred Thuillier (1899–1909)
- Athanase Bassinet (1899–1914)
- Charles Expert-Bezançon (1900–1909)
- Léon Piettre (1900–1909)
- Alfred Mascuraud (1905–1926)
- Auguste Ranson (1907–1927)
- Adolphe Maujan (1909–1914)
- Auguste Gervais (1909–1917)
- Léon Barbier (1909–1919)
- Paul Magny (1914–1925)
- Charles Deloncle (1914–1936)
- Théodore Steeg (1914–1940)
- André Berthelot (1920–1927)
- Louis Dausset (1920–1927)
- Raphaël Levy (1920–1927)
- Ernest Billiet (1920–1927)
- Alexandre Millerand (1925–1927)
- Amédée Dherbecourt (1927–1936)
- Lucien Voilin (1927–1936)
- Pierre Laval (1927–1936)
- Charles Auray (1927–1938)
- André Morizet (1927–1940)
- Auguste Mounié (1927–1940)
- Alexandre Bachelet (1927–1940)
- Marcel Cachin (1936–1940)
- Jean-Marie Clamamus (1936–1940)
- Eugène Fiancette (1936–1940)
- Henri Sellier (1936–1940)
- Paul Fleurot (1936–1940)
- Victor Constant (1938–1940)

== Fourth Republic ==
Senators for Seine under the French Fourth Republic were:

- Max André (1946–1947)
- Marc Gerber (1946–1948)
- Léon Mauvais (1946–1948)
- Simone Rollin (1946–1948)
- Julien Brunhes (1946–1948) and 1952–1959
- Bernard Lafay (1946–1951)
- Marcel Renet (1946–1952)
- Georges Marrane (1946–1956)
- Henri Barré (1946–1958)
- Suzanne Girault (1946–1958)
- Marcelle Devaud (1946–1958)
- Gilberte Brossolette (1946–1958)
- Joanny Berlioz (1946–1958)
- Léo Hamon (1946–1958)
- Georges Laffargue (1946–1958)
- Jean Primet (1946–1958)
- Yvonne Dumont (1946–1959)
- Gabriel Ferrier (1947–1948)
- Édouard Corniglion-Molinier (1948–1951)
- Pierre de Gaulle (1948–1951)
- André Souquière (1948–1952)
- Jean Chaintron (1948–1958)
- Jacques Debu-Bridel (1948–1958)
- Henry Torrès (1948–1958)
- Jean Bertaud (1948–1959)
- Ernest Petit (1948–1959)
- Jean Fleury (1951–1952)
- Jean Guiter (1951–1952)
- Charles Deutschmann (1951–1958)
- Waldeck L'Huillier (1952–1959)
- Edmond Michelet (1952–1959)
- René Plazanet (1952–1959)
- Renée Dervaux (1956–1959)
- Jean Lolive (1958)
- Raymond Baudin (1958–1959)
- Raymond Bossus (1958–1959)
- Maurice Coutrot (1958–1959)
- Georges Dardel (1958–1959)
- André Fosset (1958–1959)
- Robert Francotte (1958–1959)
- Charles Fruh (1958–1959)
- Pierre Giraud (1958–1959)
- Joseph Lanet (1958–1959)
- Roger Ménager (1958–1959)
- Louis Talamoni (1958–1959)

== Fifth Republic ==
Senators for Seine under the French Fifth Republic:

- Edmond Barrachin
- Jacques Baumel
- Maurice Bayrou
- Raymond Bossus
- Julien Brunhes
- Georges Cogniot
- Maurice Coutrot
- Georges Dardel
- Renée Dervaux
- Jacques Duclos
- Jean Fleury
- André Fosset
- Charles Fruh
- Jean Ganeval
- Roger Garaudy
- Raymond Guyot
- Bernard Lafay
- Joseph Lanet
- Waldeck l'Huillier
- Jacques Marette
- Georges Marrane
- Edmond Michelet
- Dominique Pado
- Ernest Petit
- Jeannette Thorez Vermeersch
- Jean-Louis Vigier

== Sources ==
- Liste des anciens sénateurs de la IIIème République par circonscription (in French), Sénat de France
- Liste des anciens sénateurs de la IVème République par circonscription (in French), Sénat de France
- Liste des anciens sénateurs de la Vème République par circonscription (in French), Sénat de France
- Liste par département – Seine (in French), Sénat de France
