= Raphaël-Georges Lévy =

French banker, economist and politician (1853–1933)

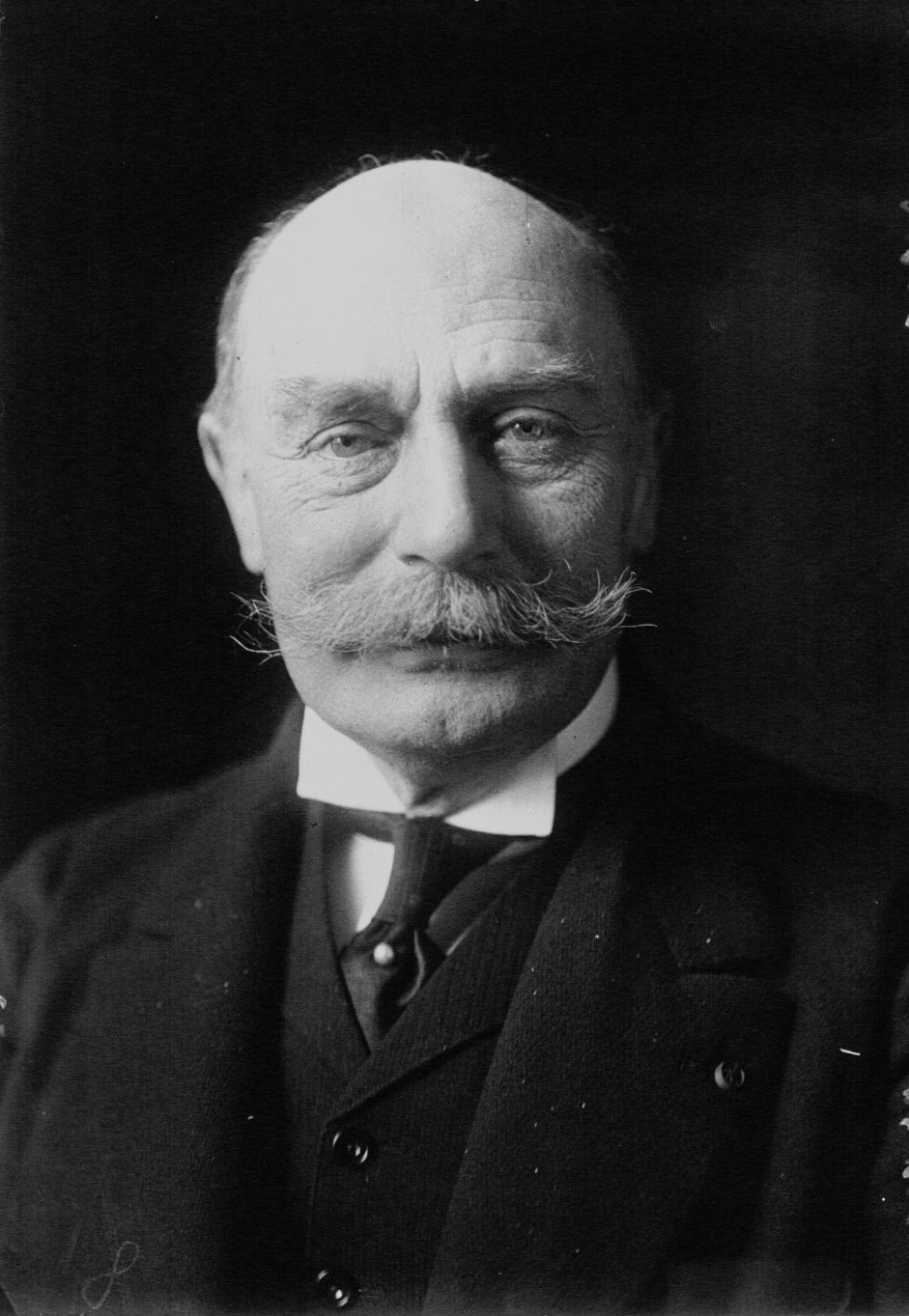
- Raphaël-Georges Lévy in 1921

Senator of Seine
- In office 11 January 1920 – 8 January 1927

Personal details
- Born: 24 February 1853 Paris, France
- Died: 8 December 1933 (aged 80) Paris, France
- Occupation: Economist, politician

Raphaël-Georges Lévy (24 February 1853 – 8 December 1933) was a French banker, economist and politician. He taught for many years at the École libre des sciences politiques. He had liberal economic beliefs, including support for free trade and central bank independence. He was a Senator of Seine from 1920 to 1927.

== Early years (1853–70) ==
Raphaël-Georges Lévy was born on 24 February 1853 in Paris. He was Jewish. His parents were Benjamin Lévy and Eugénie Bamberger. His father was an inspector-general of public instruction. His mother Eugénie Bamberger (1828–1904), known as Jenny, was the daughter of August Bamberger and Amelie Bischoffsheim, of the Bischoffsheim family of bankers. His uncle, the banker Henri Bamberger, was co-founder of the Banque de Paris et des Pays-Bas. He was related to Marcel Proust through his sister Marguerite (née Lévy, 1859–1926), wife of Daniel Mayer, the first cousin of Proust's mother. (Note: In 1907 or 1908 Proust asked Lévy for advice on his investments, and after that the two men exchanged several letters. The two men do not seem to have had more than a passing acquaintance.)

Raphaël-Georges Lévy grew up in an intellectual environment. He attended the Lycée Louis-le-Grand, graduating with first prize in mathematics and a prize of honour in rhetoric, which earned him the personal congratulations of Napoleon III. After the Franco-Prussian War of 1870 he obtained a degree in Law.

== Businessman and academic (1870–1914) ==
Lévy joined his uncle's Banque de Paris et des Pays-Bas, where he was responsible for a number of foreign inquiries in which he showed his business acumen. He was interested in turn in South African gold mines, the Crédit Mobilier, the Franco-Chinese economic association and the Channel Tunnel. He left banking and taught at the Association des cours commerciaux, then the Ecole supérieure d'enseignement financier and finally at the Ecole libre des sciences politiques. He spent 30 years at this last school, where he became one of the most eminent professors. He became a municipal councilor for Deauville in 1900.

On 4 January 1882 Lévy married Marguerite Augustine Halphen (1861–1929) in Paris. Their daughter was Suzanne Guillemette Ernesta Lévy (1884–1955). Lévy became president of various learned societies such as the Société de statistique. He was elected a member of the Académie des Sciences Morales et Politiques in 1913.

== World War I (1914–18) ==
With the outbreak of World War I (1914–18) Lévy remained in Paris and converted his town house into a military hospital, keeping two modest rooms for himself and his wife. From 1914 to 1919 this hospital treated soldiers at Lévy's expense. He was assisted at the hospital by Antoine-Louis Cornette, founder of the Scouts de France. On 9 February 1917 Le Figaro reported that by a large majority Levy had been elected president of the Societe d'Économie politique. The society had two presidents. Yves Guyot had replaced Paul Leroy-Beaulieu as the first president.

== Postwar career (1919–33) ==
Lévy was elected Senator for the Seine department on 11 January 1920. He joined the Finance Committee, and for five years was rapporteur of the budget of the liberated regions. In 1923 he called for two years of military service. He supported liberal economic policies, and was opposed to laws preventing export of capital, against excessive taxes on securities which would threaten savings, and against obstacles to the wheat trade. He presented many reports, including reports on reminting silver coins, the Moroccan loan and the proposed borrowing by the city of Paris and department of the Seine. Due to declining health he did not seek reelection in 1927. He left office on 8 January 1927.

Lévy was able to continue to attend the sessions of the Académie des sciences morales et politiques until 1930. In the last three year of his life he did not leave his Paris town house. This became a literary and artistic salon, where he was visited by the King of Belgium and the President of the Chinese Republic. Raphaël-Georges Lévy died on 8 December 1933 in Paris. He was an officer of the Order of the Crown (Romania), grand officer of the Order of the Crown (Belgium), grand officer of the Order of the Crown of Italy, commander of the Order of Christ (Portugal).

== Publications ==
Lévy published many books on economics, but his first publication was a volume of poems inspired by Alfred de Musset. He contributed to the Revue des deux Mondes, Revue d'économie politique, Journal des économistes and L'Economiste français and wrote many books. In 1896 he proposed creation of an international issuing bank with its headquarters in Berne, which would also clear international debts and credits based on gold. In Banques d'émission et trésors publics (1911) Levy made the case that exchange rate stability depended on the central bank being independent of the state. He wrote that "the less public authority gets involved with the management of the banking system, the better national credit and wealth are protected." In La juste paix ou le traité de Versailles (1920) he defended the 1919 Treaty of Versailles against attacks by the British economist John Maynard Keynes. Other publications included:

- Raphaël-Georges Lévy (1877), De Bonorum possessione contra tabulas. De la quotité disponible... (Thesis), Paris: impr. E. Martinet, p. 62
- Raphaël-Georges Lévy (1886), Poésies, Paris: A. Lemerre, p. 280
- Raphaël-Georges Lévy (1886), Les conversions de rentes, Paris: Cercle Saint-Simon, p. 72
- Raphaël-Georges Lévy (1888), Le Péril financier, Paris: L. Cerf, p. 384
- Raphaël-Georges Lévy (1894), Mélanges financiers : la spéculation et la banque, l'avenir des métaux précieux, le change, le billet de banque, Paris: Hachette, p. 316
- Raphaël-Georges Lévy; Jacques Siegfried (1900), Du relèvement du marché financier français, Paris: Chaix, p. 75
- Raphaël-Georges Lévy (1901), Des tendances nouvelles de la législation fiscale en Europe depuis 50 ans, Paris: Société française d'imprimerie et de librairie / Congrès des sciences politiques, p. 178
- Raphaël-Georges Lévy (1911), De la Méthode à suivre pour passer du cours forcé aux paiements en espèces, Paris: siège de la Société des industriels et des commerçants de France, p. 39
- Raphaël-Georges Lévy (1911), Banques d'émission et trésors publics, Paris: Hachette, p. 628
- Raphaël-Georges Lévy (1913), "L'Économie politique aux États-Unis", Revue internationale du commerce, de l'industrie et de la banque, Paris: Société des industriels et des commerçants de France: 76
- Raphaël-Georges Lévy (1914), Effets économiques de la mobilisation austro-hongroise, Paris: F. Alcan, p. 68
- Daniel Bellet; Émile Bourgeois; Raphaël-Georges Lévy; Gabriel Malleterre; Louis Renault (1915), La guerre: Les origines de la guerre. L'Allemagne et le droit des gens. La guerre et les armées. La guerre et les finances. L'industrie moderne et la guerre, Paris: F. Alcan, p. 228
- Raphaël-Georges Lévy (1918), Qu'est-ce qu'une banque, Paris: B. Grasset, p. 61
- Raphaël-Georges Lévy (1919), La Vie chère, causes, effets, remèdes, Paris: Hachette, p. 23
- Raphaël-Georges Lévy (1920), La juste paix, ou La vérité sur le traité de Versailles, Paris: Plon-Nourrit et Cie, p. 243
- Raphaël-Georges Lévy (1921), Initiation financière, Paris: Hachette, p. 238
- Raphaël-Georges Lévy (1927), Initiation financière (revue et corrigée ed.), Paris: Hachette, p. 241

== Sources ==
- Blanc, Jean-Daniel, "Raphaël Georges Lévy", Geneanet (in French)
- "Eugénie dite Jenny Levy", geni.com (in French)
- Flandreau, Marc (2005-07-26), Money Doctors: The Experience of International Financial Advising 1850–2000, Routledge, ISBN 978-1-134-35655-3
- Griziotti, B. (1968-12-01), "Banque des Reglements Internationaux", Recueil Des Cours, Collected Courses, 1932 (in French), Martinus Nijhoff Publishers, ISBN 90-286-0792-7
- Jolly, Jean (1960), "Lévy (Raphaël-Georges)", Dictionnaire des parlementaires français (1889-1940) (in French), Presses Universitaires de France
- Lévy Raphaël (in French), Sénat
- Raphaël-Georges Lévy (1853–1933) – Auteur du texte (in French), BnF: Bibliotheque nationale de France
- "Renseignements mondains", Le Figaro (in French), 9 February 1917 – via Gallica
- Wise, Pyra (2005), "Trois lettres et une dédicace inédites de Marcel Proust conservées à la Pierpont Morgan Library", Bulletin d'Informations Proustiennes (in French) (35), Éditions rue d’Ulm, Presses de l’École normale supérieure
- "Jews Quietly Play Prominent Roles in French Life", Jewish Telegraphic Agency
