= Ernest Billiet =

French politician

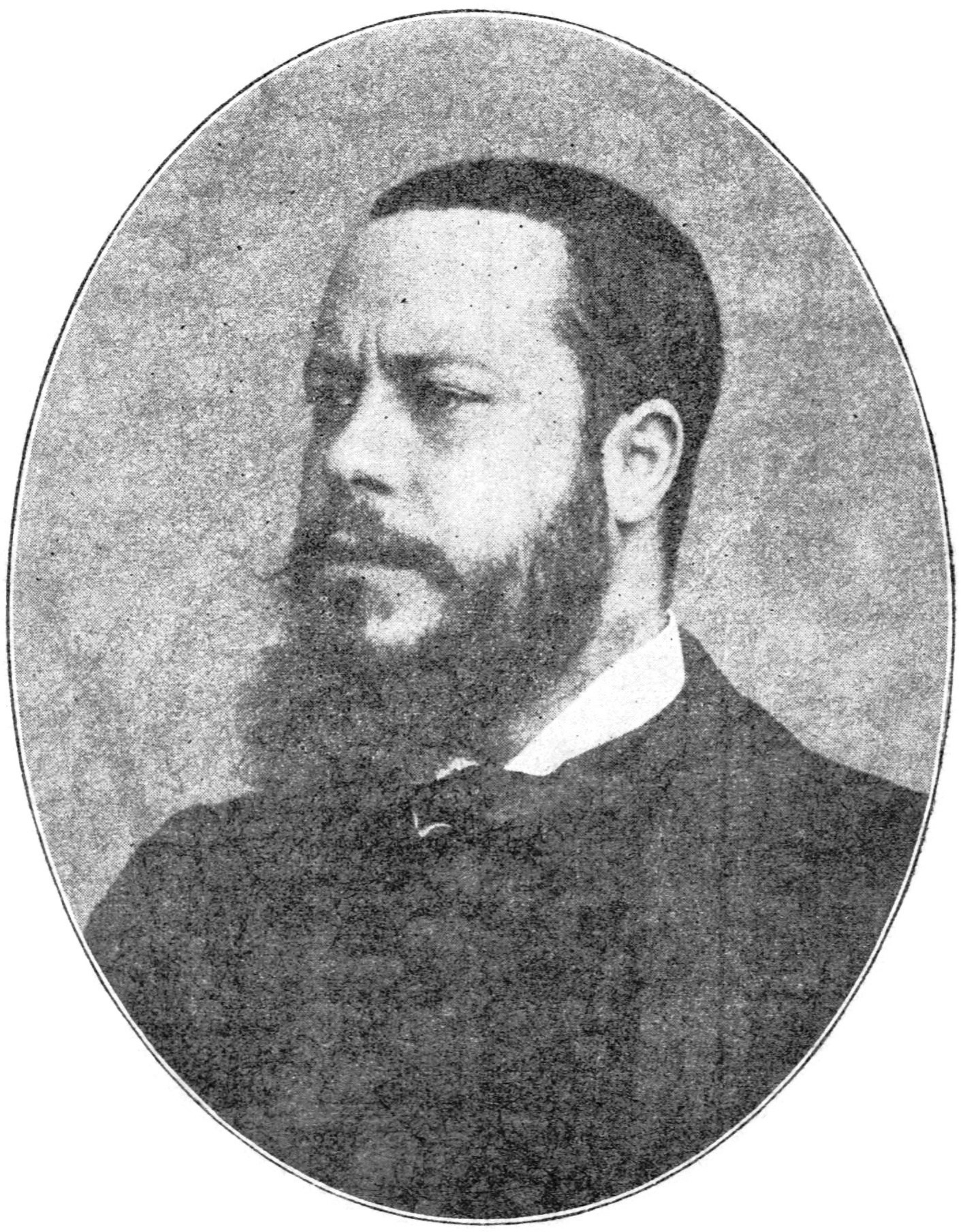
- Ernest Billiet in 1897.
- Born: 1 July 1873; Cairo, Egypt
- Died: 21 March 1930 (aged 56); Asnières-sur-Seine, France
- Occupation: Politician

Ernest Billiet (1 July 1873 – 21 March 1939) was a French politician. He served as a member of the French Senate from 1920 to 1927.
