= Mauvais noir =

Mauvais noir is an alternative name to several wine grape varieties including:

- Dolcetto
- Douce noir
- Peloursin
