= Jacques Sadoul (politician) =

French lawyer, politician and writer

Jacques Numa Sadoul
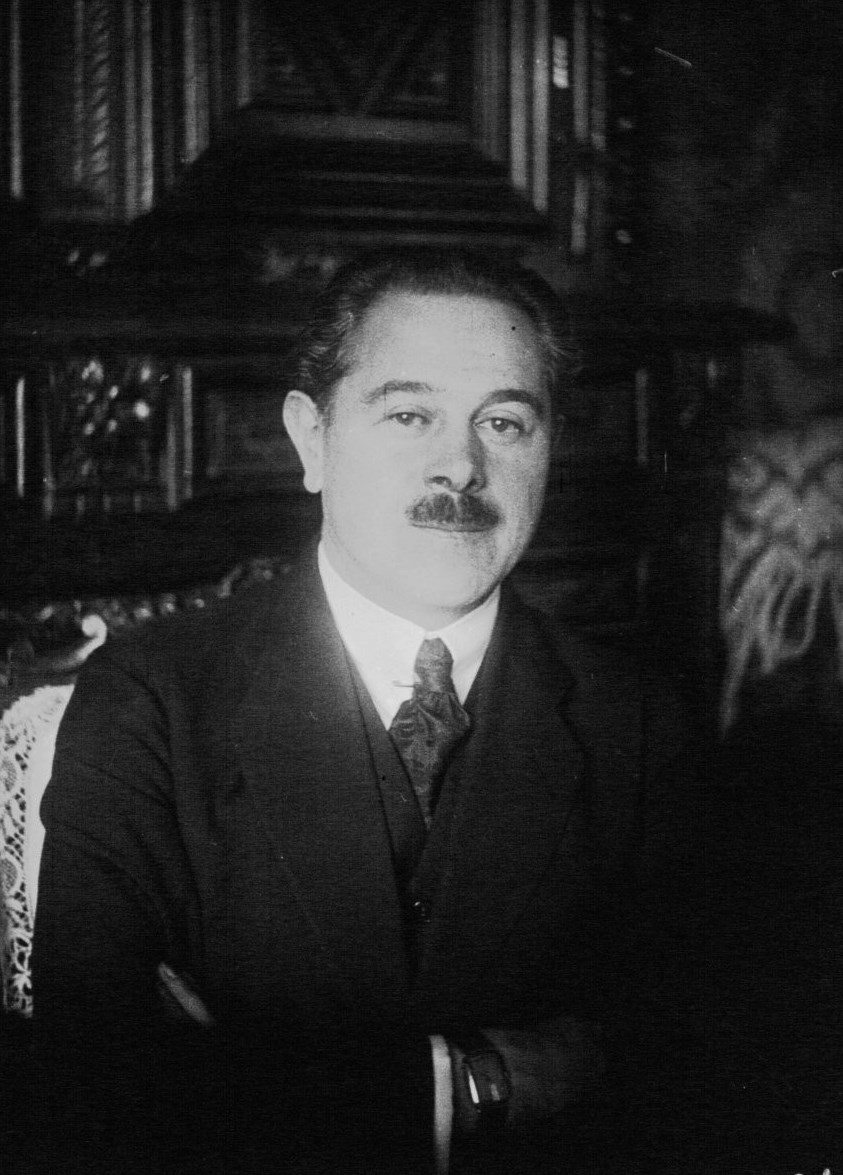
- Sadoul during his 1925 trial

Member of the Comintern Executive Committee
- In office 1922

Delegate of the French Communist Group
- In office 1919–1920

Personal details
- Born: May 22, 1881 Paris, France
- Died: November 18, 1956 (aged 75)
- Party: French Section of the Workers' International; French Communist Group; French Communist Party
- Spouse: Yvonne Mezzara (1889–1993)
- Relations: Élie Faure (co-father-in-law)
- Children: Ary Sadoul (1908–1936)
- Profession: Lawyer, journalist, army organizer

Military service
- Allegiance: (France) Third French Republic; Russian Soviet Federative Socialist Republic
- Years of service: 1916–1918
- Rank: Captain
- Battles/wars: World War I; Eastern Front; October Revolution; Russian Civil War; Southern Front

Jacques Numa Sadoul, commonly known as Captain Sadoul (Russian: Жак Саду́ль, Zhak Sadul; May 22, 1881 – November 18, 1956), was a French lawyer, communist politician, and writer, one of the founders of the Communist International. He began his career in the French Section of the Workers' International (SFIO) in Vienne, and, by the time of World War I, was serving under Albert Thomas, the Minister of Armaments. A French Army Captain, he was Thomas' envoy to the Russian Republic, keeping contact with the socialist circles and steering them toward the Entente Powers. After the October Revolution, he maintained close contacts with the Bolsheviks, pledging them his support against the Central Powers during the crisis of 1917–1918. He was unable to prevent Bolshevist Russia from signing the Treaty of Brest-Litovsk, which took her out of the war, but, having established close contacts with Leon Trotsky and other communist leaders, became a communist himself.

Opting not to return to France during the Russian Civil War, Sadoul co-founded the French Communist Group in Russia, fighting for control of it against Pierre Pascal and Henri Guilbeaux. Helping to set up the Red Army, he was sent to Ukraine, where he instigated mutinies among the French intervention troops, and then to Germany, where he set up communist cells. Sadoul also mediated between the International and the SFIO's left-wing, attracting members for what became the French Communist Party (PCF), and contributed doctrinaire essays in L'Humanité. A French military court sentenced him to death in absentia, while the SFIO presented him, symbolically, as a candidate in the 1919 elections.

Finally moving back to France in 1924, and acquitted upon retrial, Sadoul remained at the center of controversy. He joined the PCF, but failed to win any elections, and was generally marginalized by the party leadership. A Stalinist apologist and Izvestia correspondent in the 1930s, he helped the Soviet Union maintain contacts with the French establishment, and represented Soviet interests in France. He was pressured into collaborationism with Vichy France during World War II, but openly returned to communism in 1944, and ended his career in politics as mayor of Sainte-Maxime.

== Biography ==
=== Early career ===
The son of a magistrate, Sadoul was born in Paris on May 22, 1881. He was an alumnus of Lycée Condorcet. While studying there, he met and befriended Eugène Schueller, future founder of the L'Oréal cosmetics empire. Together with Marcel Cachin, they founded a socialist people's university in the settlement of La Chapelle. In 1903, Sadoul registered with the bar association and worked for the Court of Appeal of Paris.

A provincial lawyer assigned to the appellate court of Poitiers, and a reserve officer, Sadoul married Yvonne Mezzara (born 1889), who was distantly related to the historian Ernest Renan. Their son, Ary, was born in 1908. Jacques soon entered party politics, joining the SFIO. He was its secretary in Vienne during the 1910s, and also served as head of the local Confederation of Labor. In August 1912, the SFIO selected him to run for a vacated National Assembly seat in Montmorillon. He won some 3,900 votes, but lost to the Radical Party candidate. He ran a second time in the legislative election of May 1914—the last vote before the outbreak of World War I later that summer. For the next three years, he stood on the SFIO's center, but was sympathetic to its far-left wing, the "Committee for the Resumption of International Relations".

In 1916, Albert Thomas, the SFIO Minister of Armaments, appointed Sadoul as his Undersecretary of State for Artillery. Thomas obtained that Sadoul be assigned to General Henri Niessel's French Military Mission in Petrograd, where he arrived in late September 1917, leaving behind his wife and son. He reached Russia by way of Scotland and Sweden, crossing in at Tornio. What Thomas hoped to obtain from Sadoul was a direct line of communication between the SFIO and the various socialist groups which either supported or opposed the Russian Provisional Government, and thus to keep Russia on the Entente side. The Thomas–Sadoul link remained especially strong, to the point where observers called him "Thomas' personal informant" or "Thomas' creature". For the next year, Sadoul was to keep a political diary, described by historian Adam Ulam as "elegantly composed in the form of letters addressed to his French protector and fellow Socialist, Albert Thomas." Other Frenchmen also joined Sadoul in his diplomatic effort, including Lieutenant Pierre ("Piotr Karlovich") Pascal. A Russian studies scholar who was otherwise known as a Christian socialist and Thomist writer, he had fought with distinction on the Western Front before being assigned to the military mission.

=== October Revolution ===
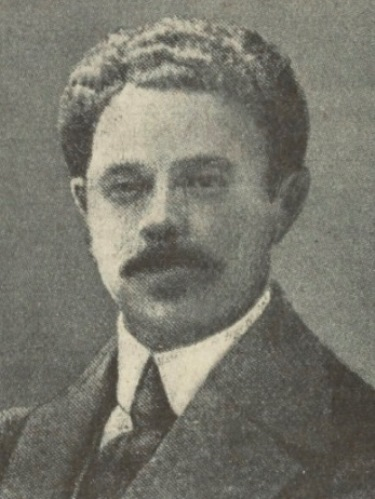
Photograph of Sadoul during his time in Vienne, ca. 1912

Upon arrival, Sadoul noticed "the [Russians'] desire for an immediate peace, at any cost". The October Revolution of late 1917 toppled the Provisional Government and brought in its stead a Council of People's Commissars entirely controlled by the Bolshevik faction. On November 8, Sadoul recorded the Red Guards' lynchings of their opponents, including Prince Tumanov, and rumors of war rape. The new Russian Soviet Republic moved toward communism and proletarian internationalism, stating its intention to withdraw from the "imperialistic" war. Not dissuaded by the events, both Niessel and Sadoul gave free lectures on the French war effort at the Alliance Française. Days after the Revolution, Sadoul had established contact with the People's Commissar for Foreign Affairs, Leon Trotsky. Trotsky spoke to him about his efforts to pacify the Menshevik opposition on the left, while also quelling the Kerensky–Krasnov uprising. Sadoul believed that Trotsky intended to share power with the Mensheviks. Recording Trotsky's modest demeanor, he claims that the Commissar had moved out of his home because the concierge threatened to have him killed.

During winter, the Bolshevik government approached the Central Powers for a peace deal, but the negotiations stalled when the Bolsheviks were confronted with the enemy's demands. Sadoul was enthusiastic about peace through nonresistance, but later switched to supporting partisan warfare against the Germans. Trotsky used his services to send out parallel offers to the Entente, in exchange for international recognition. In February 1918, as the German Army began its punitive advance on Petrograd, Sadoul offered his expertise as a military saboteur to the Chairman of the Commissars, Vladimir Lenin. As noted by Lenin, Sadoul also brought with him French monarchist officers, including Guy Louis Jean de Lubersac, who agreed to fight under a communist banner "to secure the defeat of Germany". Despite Sadoul's interventions, Lenin refused to work with Charles Dumas, personal envoy of the French Foreign Minister Stéphen Pichon.

Eventually, on March 3, the Bolsheviks signed the Treaty of Brest-Litovsk, which conceded a German victory on the Eastern Front. Sadoul held the Entente's "shortsightedness" as the main cause of this pact. General Niessel's mission was not evacuated from Petrograd, but continued to negotiate its retreat with Trotsky, who took over as People's Commissar for Military and Naval Affairs. During such talks, Sadoul offered French material support for the Bolsheviks, prompting Niessel to suspect that his subordinate was turning communist, being "very much influenced by Trotsky." David R. Francis, the American Ambassador, was more suspicious than Niessel, believing Sadoul to be an agent for the Bolshevik government.

=== Niessel's departure ===
Reportedly, Sadoul insisted to accompany Niessel as the latter decided to return to France, but he was ordered to stay behind and assist Niessel's replacement, General Bernard Lavergne. Lavergne resented Sadoul's radicalized socialism. Nevertheless, he also pledged assistance for Trotsky, noting that the projected Red Army remained the only credible obstacle to German advances in the East. Both Trotsky and Sadoul believed that the stage was set for an understanding between the "Russian bourgeoisie" and the Germans, which made the Bolsheviks natural allies of France. In his letters to Thomas, Sadoul also argued that the Bolshevik regime hoped to undo Brest-Litovsk, and therefore cheered for the Anglo–American–French forces during the German spring offensive on the Western Front. Decades later, he noted that "despite their [...] caste hatred for the [Bolshevik] regime of the masses, most of these officers [assigned to help Trotsky] still understood the material usefulness [...] of partaking in the construction of a new Russian army, one sooner or later capable of resuming the fight against Germany, as an Entente ally."

According to Ulam, such notions reveal Sadoul as "one of the world's greatest optimists: how could a few Allied military specialists reorganize an army that did not exist?" Ulam describes Sadoul as "rather foolish", and sees his reading of the temporary Franco–Russian alliance as "idiotic". The historian also highlights Lenin's own commentary on the news: "Please add my vote to those who are in favor of receiving food and weapons from the Anglo–French imperialist robbers." Scholar Jean Delmas notes that the Bolshevik pledge to the Entente "rested solely on the personality of Trotsky": "even Sadoul acknowledged that Lenin wrote off any military adventure." According to researcher Dominique Lejeune, Niessel's offer of assistance was itself unconvincing, and mutual trust was sabotaged by the Japanese landings in the Russian Far East.

Sadoul and the remainder of the mission moved to Moscow on March 13. He witnessed there the start of the Left SR uprising, including Maria Spiridonova's call to terrorist action against the Commissars. By April 1918, Sadoul was frequenting the Moscow anarchists, praising their collectivism and squatting practices. He befriended their spokesman, Alexander Gay, who told him that Bolshevism was being infected by "impure and dangerous elements", and, Sadoul claims, plotted his very own anarchist revolt.

Sadoul's letters to Thomas soon doubled as protests against the Allied (including French) intervention in support of the anti-Bolshevik White movement. On August 28, he wrote an anti-French letter addressed to the pacifist Romain Rolland, and also taken up in the Bolshevik press. The Swiss correspondent Robert Vaucher read it and concluded: "[Sadoul] is an irreducible Bolshevist in French uniform." Nevertheless, a Swiss newspaper, La Feuille, reprinted it, and Jean Longuet read it out in front of the delegates to the SFIO Congress in October 1918.

=== French Communist Group ===
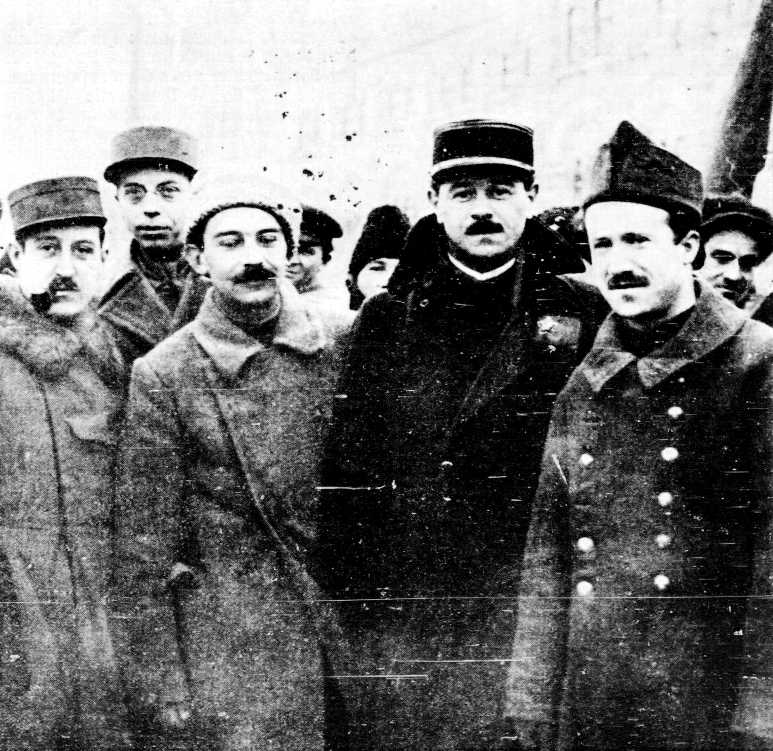
Sadoul (second from right), flanked by Pierre Pascal and Marcel Body (1922 photograph)

Like the American Oliver M. Sayler, Sadoul was one of the first foreign observers to compare the Bolshevik and French Revolutions, justifying the decimation of Whites, Socialist Revolutionaries, and other "puppets of the Entente", as a political expediency against counterrevolution. He also suggested that Bolshevik "despotism" was preferable to either anarchism or liberal democracy. In his letter to Rolland, he referred to the Bolshevik insurgency as "the eldest daughter" of France's 1789 uprising. Such theorizing did not quell the Bolsheviks' suspicion: Lenin "didn't think much" of Sadoul, and merely referred to him as an agent of "French imperialism". Vaucher claims that Trotsky and other high-ranking Bolsheviks "speak of Sadoul with an ironic smile" but "put him to good use." Sadoul's "weakness in front of discerning politicians such as Trotsky" is also noted by Lejeune.

Over the following years, Sadoul remained a major admirer of Trotsky, celebrating his great capacity for work and intellectual achievements. In his view, Trotsky represented the Revolution's "soul of steel". The former French captain also met other Bolsheviks of note, including Yakov Sverdlov and Alexandra Kollontai. He describes Kollontai as "seductive", and, Ulam recounts, left "solicitous" records of her affair with the "ferocious" Bolshevik Pavel Dybenko. Sadoul was interested in Kollontai's free love movement, recording the spread of sex communes, but was reassured by Trotsky that these "were not to be taken seriously." His other letters comprise ample praises of Bolshevik policies in culture, art, and science. His other enthusiastic reflections on such topics were published in 1918 as Vive la République des Soviets! ("Long Live the Soviet Republic!").

During those months, Sadoul refused to return and complete his service in the French Army, although he later claimed that he had never received his orders. The People's Commissars dissolved the French mission, but Sadoul remained in Moscow, sharing a villa with Pascal (their landlord was a prestigious architect). Together with other exiles, they founded the politically unstable French Communist Group. Nominally led by Pascal, it had Sadoul for its main animator.

In late 1918, Sadoul and Pascal, alongside Inessa Armand and Marcel Body, began putting out the political weekly Troisième Internationale. Due to shortages, it originally had only two pages per issue, and was printed on wrapping paper. Although introduced as the "organ of the French communists in Moscow", it was not fully Bolshevik in tone. The revolutionary Victor Serge, who spent time attending the Communist Group's sessions, Pascal was more inclined to support the anarchists and Kollontai's "Workers' Opposition". According to Body, his typographers included Menshevik opponents of the Commissars' government. The editorial staff also refused to publish official Bolshevik statistics after Pascal discovered that these had been faked. These hesitations caused a rift within the Group: Sadoul, who fought for leadership against Pascal, denounced the latter to the Cheka as a Menshevik and a Catholic dissident.

=== Comintern Congress and Odessa episode ===
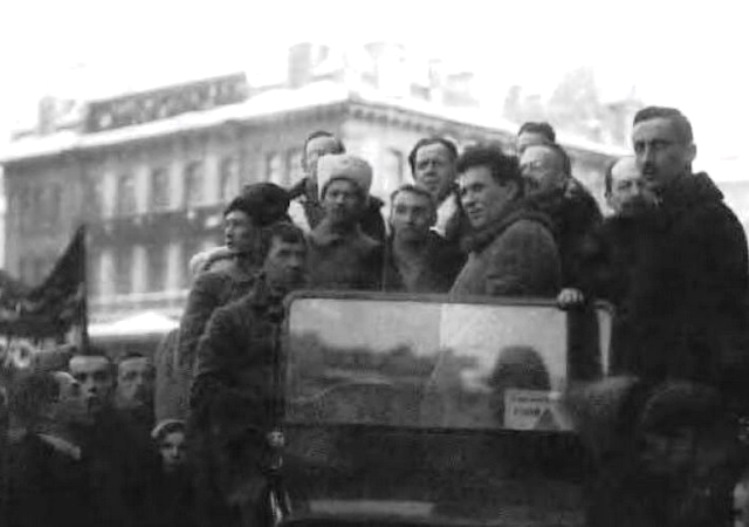
The Comintern's 1st Congress. In the car, Grigory Zinoviev and Anatoly Lunacharsky, with foreign delegates—Hugo Eberlein, Otto Grimlund, Fritz Platten, and Karl Steinhardt. Sadoul is the left of the car, in profile, addressing Zinoviev

In late 1918, a French expeditionary corps commanded by Louis Franchet d'Espèrey entered Ukraine and attempted to contain Bolshevik penetration (see Southern Russia intervention). The Russian government dispatched Sadoul, by then an officer in the Red Army, on a mission to spread anti-war and mutinous propaganda (including Vive la République des Soviets!) among the French troops. The French commanders recorded that the effect of such work was pervasive and infuriating, leading them to capture and execute the Communist Group's Jeanne Labourde in retaliation.

Upon his return to Moscow, Sadoul became directly implicated in the effort to establish the Communist International (Comintern, or "Third International"). Welcoming the Asian delegates at a public rally on December 5, he voiced his hope for a socialist revolution in France, and suggested that the Communist Group take over representation of French interests in Moscow. He was then dispatched, together with others, to assist the German revolutionary soviets, setting up Bolshevik "academies" in Berlin, Hamburg and Bremen. In March 1919, Sadoul was a co-founder of the Comintern, representing a still-to-be-born French Communist Party (PCF) at the International's first-ever meeting, and forfeiting his SFIO mandate. In his speech there, he attacked the reformist leaders of French socialism, including Longuet, Alphonse Merrheim and Léon Jouhaux. Overall, his activity was minimal, as he could speak neither Russian nor German (the two working languages of the Comintern).

Confirmed as the new leader, Sadoul was seconded by Henri Guilbeaux, who nevertheless resented his "Bonapartism" and complained that it was splitting the Communist Group. Serge recalls that the Group's was "completely demoralized" by the Guilbeaux–Sadoul conflict. He contrasts the two as irreconcilable characters: Guilbeaux was a "failure", while Sadoul embodied "a great charmer, a splendid raconteur, a sybarite, and a cool careerist to boot." Later that year, his Thomas diaries were published by Éditions de la Sirène of Paris, as Notes sur la révolution bolchévique ("Notes on the Bolshevik Revolution")—with prefaces by Thomas and Henri Barbusse. The publication was advised by Lenin himself, after copies of the letters had been seized from Sadoul during a random house-search. Nevertheless, as a record of Russian life under communism, the Notes received a chilly response in both France and Switzerland.

Eventually, Sadoul was expelled from the Communist Group, but without losing his faith in Bolshevism. Also in 1919, he prefaced a propaganda brochure by Serge, in which he announced to the French proletariat that: "Capitalist society is definitely doomed. The war and its consequences, the impossibility, given the resources available to us, of resolving the new problems, have cleared the way for the victorious march of the Third International." Other such pieces by him and Pascal were carried in Boris Souvarine's Bulletin Communiste; Sadoul contributed an introduction to Souvarine's essay on the Comintern. He centered his polemics against the SFIO representatives in Parliament, accusing them of corruption and moderation, while publishing eulogistic portraits of the Russian Bolsheviks.

Sadoul's work for the Red Army and the Comintern was branded a treasonous act in France, particularly after revelations about his activities in Ukraine. In January 1919, a source quoted by Le Petit Parisien also noted that Sadoul had no redeeming contribution to the repatriation of French hostages in Russia. Together with another expatriate, the Marquis Delafarre, he acted as a Red Army recruiter among the captured French soldiers. In July, Christian Rakovsky, head of the Ukrainian Council of People's Commissars, assigned Sadoul to negotiate an exchange of prisoners with the French Navy at Odessa. During the Franco–Russian deliberations, he claimed that the French captives were volunteers in the Red Army and would not be released before fulfilling their duty. Such news renewed the scandal in France, and, in October, Sadoul became the subject of a military inquiry. He was tried in absentia for assisting the enemy and acts of sedition, in what the New-York Tribune described as "a precedent for the attitude of Allied and associated powers toward other nationals who have aided the Bolsheviki [sic]." Thomas attended the proceedings as Sadoul's friendly witness.

=== Death sentence and related scandals ===
On November 7, 1919, Sadoul was ultimately sentenced to death. This did not prevent the SFIO from putting him up as a top candidate in the French legislative elections, on its list for the Second Sector of Paris. He was rejected by most of the local socialists, but supported by Bracke-Desrousseaux and André Berthon, and more indirectly by Léon Blum. The initiative caused national indignation. According to the Sisteron Journal, it showed that the SFIO was "duping" its voters, and adopting the "hateful principles of the Lenins and the Trotskys". As noted by historian Nicolas Texier, "the will of certain socialist to maintain the unity of the left" by granting eligible positions to Sadoul and other Bolsheviks cemented in France the notion of a "Red Peril".

The revolutionary syndicalist Georges Sorel noted at the time: "in coming up with Sadoul, [the socialists] present themselves as a target for chauvinistic passions, without gaining much; this Sadoul would be a nobody in Paris were it not for his stay in Russia." Bolshevism and Sadoul's candidacy also alienated moderate leftists from the Young Republic League, who joined efforts with the mainstream conservatives of the National Bloc. As a result, the Bloc came first across the country—Sadoul himself won some 41,300 votes, short of the threshold. The news was welcomed in Europe's right-wing circles: the Romanian D. Nanu noted the socialists' "brazenness" in putting up "the traitor Sadoul"; the results, he argued, showed that "the fatherland ideal" prevailed over the Comintern.

Meanwhile, Sadoul left his Ukrainian post and again headed for Berlin, where he tried to reorganize the German Communists in the wake of the Spartacist uprising. In the early months of 1920, he acted as instructor of SFIO members who attended the Second Comintern Congress, in particular Marcel Cachin and Ludovic-Oscar Frossard. Also joining them were Raymond Lefebvre, for whom Sadoul acted as guide, and the socialist organizer Lucien Deslinières, whom he introduced to Lenin. He also played a part in organizing the Congress of the Peoples of the East, but criticized Comintern Secretary Karl Radek for allowing the delegations to include anti-colonial nationalists rather than just communists.

During the Comintern's negotiations with the SFIO, Sadoul approved of maintaining the unity of the party and of not stripping moderates of their membership. However, he played a part in expelling from Russia the SFIO's Ernest Lafont—he accused Lafont of not wanting to divulge information he had received about the Polish maneuvers in the Battle of Warsaw. As he put it: "Many whose conscience is clearer [than Lafont's] have had to be shot." Sadoul himself was stripped of his delegate position at the Comintern, in favor of Guilbeaux, and demoted to a consultative office. Alfred Rosmer, who sat on the Executive Committee, explains that Sadoul was still formally a SFIO member and his only other credentials were from the Communist Group. The decision angered Radek, who also "detested Guilbeaux for personal reasons". In the end, both Sadoul and Guilbeaux were given half-mandates.

Although still legally married, Sadoul took an official mistress. Unaware of this liaison, Yvonne left for Moscow in May 1920, arriving there just as Sadoul's Russian son was about to be born. In January 1921, she sued for legal separation in Paris, noting that the confiscation of Sadoul's belongings by the French state had left her without an income. Jacques' brother Marcel had also settled in Moscow to do business, and worked as a Belgian representative in the Russian capital. According to his own words, he was "full of sympathy for Bolshevism, but not a communist". However, he criticized the Soviet regime for its bureaucracy and for keeping "the bulk of its population in misery"; Jacques Sadoul and Pierre Pascal were dismissive of such observations.

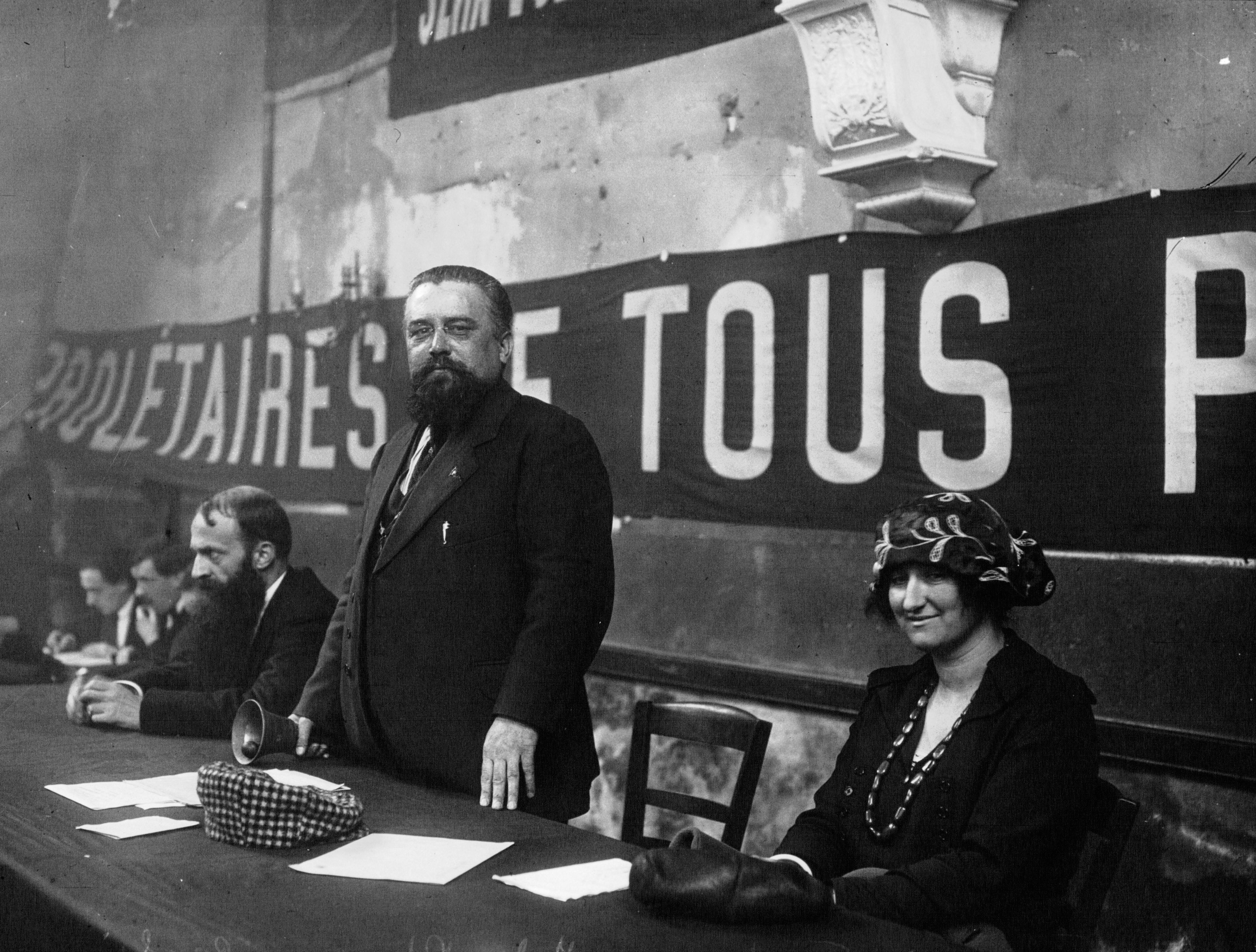
Yvonne Sadoul as Secretary of the Tours Congress (December 1920). President Jules Blanc is pictured standing

The PCF was formally established at the Tours Congress (December 1920), of which Yvonne Sadoul was a secretary. At the time, Captain Sadoul was in Germany, returning to Moscow in 1921 on the same convoy as Radek, Enver Pasha, Curt Geyer and Paul Levi. In 1922, reinstated by the Comintern, he was admitted into its executive committee.

Sadoul was also a defender of the Socialist Revolutionary Party's "second group" in the Moscow show trial, a last-minute replacement for Antonio Gramsci. Like Serge, he felt emotional about the demise of "this peasant Party of significance", his intervention ensuring that no SRs were executed. In September, Sadoul prepared for a trip to Ankara, where he was supposed to reestablish the Turkish Communist Party. The plan fell apart when Mustafa Kemal issued a warning for the Comintern not to get involved. Around 1923, he was again in Berlin, at Grunewald, playing host to Serge and Nicola Bombacci.

=== Return and retrial ===
During that interval, the White émigré paper Dni alleged that Sadoul had squandered the 1.4 million chervontsev that the Comintern had provided for stirring up revolt in the French colonial empire. From abroad, Sadoul published in the PCF's L'Humanité, condemning the occupation of the Ruhr as a ruse by the French industrial lobby. His other articles, outlining the core ideas of the "united front" strategy, were circulated by Longuet at the SFIO Congress of 1923, and taken as proof that the PCF was to be mistrusted. The PCF intended to present Sadoul and Guilbeaux as its main candidates in the May 1924 elections, but the authorities censured this move; the communist list was consequently changed to include Hadjali Abdelkader, an Algerian independence militant.

The election marked a decisive victory for the left-wing alliance, Cartel des Gauches. Rather than promising social reforms, the Cartel focused on symbolic causes, including amnesty for Sadoul, which was also one of the PCF's key demands. On December 3, Sadoul reentered France through Belgium, just as Prime Minister Édouard Herriot was contemplating the normalization of relations with the Soviet Union. He was welcomed in the home of industrialist Albert Vidal, who had been his friend since before the world war.

Following a stakeout, the Sûreté arrested Sadoul in Paris (where he was visiting the PCF's Jacques Doriot), and dispatched him to Cherche-Midi prison. By then, the government was advancing an amnesty law project, defended in Senate by René Renoult, the Justice Minister. At the time, Renoult announced that Herriot was ready to use his pardoning power in case Senate refused to pass the law. Sadoul himself made clear his intent of standing trial, and employed Berthon as his lawyer.

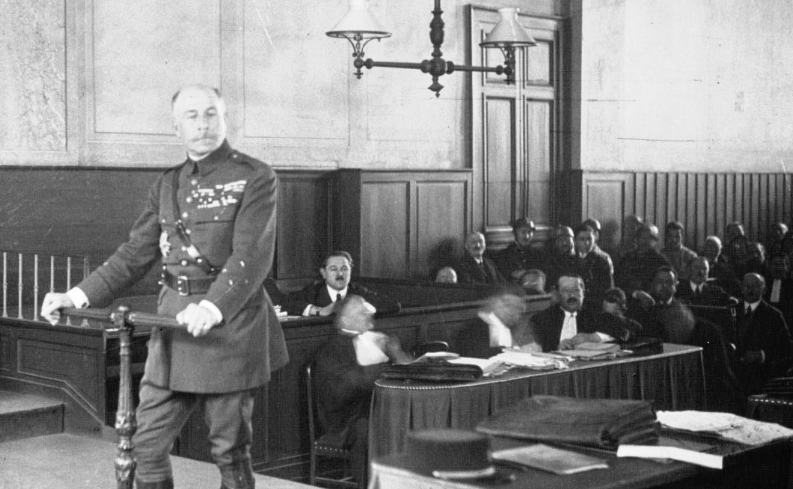
Henri Niessel taking the stand as a hostile witness during Sadoul's 1925 retrial. Sadoul is sitting in the defendants' box

The PCF initially took distance from Sadoul, claiming that he was merely a party sympathizer and that his return was spontaneous, but, faced with public uproar, acknowledged his membership. In early 1925, Sadoul was retried for desertion by the War Council of the 5th Army Corps in Orléans. Thomas and Rakovsky were present as defense witnesses. The latter stated that Sadoul "never participated in Soviet governance". The defense also introduced a letter from Trotsky, which claimed that Sadoul had been the only "good-faith member" of the military mission.

Sadoul was ultimately acquitted, and, reportedly, was due to participate in French–Soviet negotiations. By August 1925, the Sûreté closed the file on a second charge against the former Captain, that of "collaboration with the enemy". Although he was received back into the Army and assigned to the military governor of Paris, he remained heckled and disgraced. Having obtained readmission into the bar association, he was involved in a fistfight with some of his anti-communist colleagues, then physically assaulted during a political rally in Angles-sur-l'Anglin. In March 1926, he spoke about Russian intellectual life for the French learned societies. The event ended in a brawl provoked by the far-right youth of Camelots du Roi, led into battle by Jean Tixier. The latter was found guilty of assault and sentenced to six months in prison.

Shortly after, Sadoul prepared to leave for Greater Lebanon, where he was due to work as a lawyer for Syrian nationalists charged with sedition against French rule. However, in July, the bar association stripped him of his membership following a complaint addressed by a group of lawyers and war veterans. He was readmitted in February 1927, the bar having decided that the authorship of his propaganda tracts was in question (as well as covered by the 1924 amnesty).

=== Stalinism ===
In June 1927, Sadoul contested a city council seat at Grandes-Carrières as a PCF man, but finished third. Soon after, Sadoul found himself marginalized within the PCF, which excluded from promotion those cadres that had been directly involved in Soviet politics. Subsequently, he worked mainly as a foreign correspondent for Izvestia, briefly returning to the Soviet Union during the celebration of the October Revolution. He was an official guest of the VOKS, but also a delegate of the Amis de l'URSS society, in which capacity he was decorated by Kliment Voroshilov with the Order of the Red Banner.

In Moscow, he became a first-hand witness of Joseph Stalin's attacks against Trotsky's Left Opposition. His erstwhile friend Serge, who stood by Trotsky, claimed that Sadoul was corrupted, quoting his quip to the Opposition leaders: "They're not going to eat you alive, [but] why even get yourself persecuted? Life is so beautiful!" In 1930, Pascal returned to France, to work strictly in the academic field. He privately decried Soviet rule, arguing: "No regime has ever been a regime of lies to this extent."

After unsuccessfully running in the April 1928 election for a deputy seat in the 18th arrondissement, Sadoul launched political accusations against Cardinal Cerretti. The latter sued him for calumny and obtained 4,000 francs in damages. In 1930, Sadoul was in Algiers, where he addressed the railway workers. Reportedly, their trade union was banned from the Bourse du Travail as punishment for this act.

Sadoul's work also took him to Toulon, where, in 1931, he defended in court a group of sailors that had been accused of mutiny. Living mainly on the French Riviera, and campaigning for the PCF in the local elections of Saint-Tropez, Sadoul was again a PCF candidate in the 1932 race, this time in Draguignan. He only won 1,800 votes. Sadoul acquired a luxurious villa and other properties in Sainte-Maxime, for which he was attacked as a hypocrite in the press. He rented this home to the composer Sergei Prokofiev. Urging Prokofiev to sever his links with the Whites and presenting him with the speeches of Lenin, Sadoul inspired him to write the Cantata for the 20th Anniversary of the October Revolution.

Yvonne and Ary Sadoul returned to Russia as guests of the VOKS later in the 1930s. They both worked as artists and scenic designers. Noted for his earlier work with Jean Vigo, Ary died at age 28 in December 1936, of cancer or tuberculosis. He was survived by wife Marie-Zéline, youngest daughter of the art historian Élie Faure and grandniece of geographer Élisée Reclus. She was herself involved with the PCF, which also organized Ary's funeral service.

During the mid 1930s, Sadoul served as a direct link between the Soviet diplomats and Pierre Laval, the French Prime Minister and signer of the Franco-Soviet Treaty of Mutual Assistance. Sadoul was by then an outspoken supporter of Stalinism, completely revising his earlier praise for Trotsky. Following the February 1934 riots, siding with Doriot and Eugen Fried, he endorsed the creation of a Popular Front—this barrage of anti-fascist parties was disliked by Thorez, who still centered his discourse on criticism of the SFIO. He returned to the Soviet Union during the Moscow Trials, which prosecuted both Trotsky's partisans and the Right Opposition. His own conversations with Nikolai Bukharin were being used by the prosecution as evidence of Bukharin's "bourgeois" ideas. In a February 1937 letter to Gaston Bergery, Sadoul defended the legality and accuracy of the trials, citing "irrefutable proof" that the defendants were "common criminals".

Writing for L'Humanité, he also censured the Anti-Stalinist left, with attacks on Serge. The latter defended himself against Sadoul's allegations, including that he was a careerist who had supported violent French anarchism. In a show of solidarity with Serge, Trotsky referred to Sadoul as a "servile philistine" and a hypocrite: "The Comintern is doomed to destruction. The Sadouls will desert the sinking ship like rats." Rosmer, who had praised Sadoul's work in 1918, observed that his 1937 dispatches from Moscow were "grossly mendacious".

=== World War II controversy and final years ===
In August 1939, shortly before the start of World War II, France and the PCF were shocked by news of the Nazi–Soviet Pact. The PCF leader Maurice Thorez took up the defense of Soviet policies, and consequently the PCF was banned by the Édouard Daladier cabinet; meanwhile, other communists voluntarily broke with Stalinism and sided with the Allies. Sadoul took a conciliatory position. In a letter to diplomat Anatole de Monzie (intended for Daladier's notice), he blamed the Pact on France's "excessive distrust" of the Soviets. He suggested that the Allies could win back the support of Moscow by showing their readiness "to fight a total war" against Nazism. Historian Stéphane Courtois argues that, with Sadoul's help, Stalin sought to downplay his Nazi alliance as a "reversible strategy", and therefore to alleviate the fears of Herriot and Daladier.

The German defeat of France caught Sadoul in the zone libre, which became the pro-Nazi rump state, "Vichy France". Privately, he expressed his affection for the extraterritorial armies of Free France, which, he argued, concentrated "the most clairvoyant and proud among us." His wife had escaped the country, and was in Tahiti, a Free French haven, before moving to California. According to a testimony in court by Angelo Tasca, Sadoul was arrested by the Nazis but released upon the intervention of Vichy dignitary (and former PCF cadre) Paul Marion. In return for this, Marion obtained that Sadoul agree to collaborate with Vichy.

Following the Allied landings in the South and the Liberation of Paris, Sadoul returned to his old stances. In December 1944, he spoke out in support of a new pact between France and the Soviet Union, and castigated Laval and his regime for having broken the earlier one. Writing in L'Humanité, he supported the United Nations project to the point of lambasting Swiss neutrality. Nonetheless, Sadoul defended in court his old friend Eugène Schueller, who stood accused of having financed a fascist movement known as La Cagoule.

On April 29, 1945, Sadoul was elected Mayor of Sainte-Maxime. In this capacity, he confiscated the Villa Massilia, owned by a collaborationist, and assigned it to the Union of Jews for Resistance and Mutual Aid, which turned it into a haven for the orphans of the Holocaust. He was working on his last political essay, Naissance de l'U.R.S.S. ("Birth of the USSR"). Published in 1946 by Éditions Charlot, it revisited his own contribution to the 1917 events, with Sadoul taking credit for General Niessel's departure from Petrograd. According to the Catholic magazine Études, its description of the Soviet state was "too beautiful to be true", as the revelations about the Soviet political repressions were becoming known. Études dismissed the work as "partial" and "simplistic".

Having lost his mayor's office in 1947, Sadoul spent nine more years in retirement. He died on November 18, 1956. His conversations with journalist Dominique Desanti were used as sources in Desanti's 1969 book, L'Internationale communiste. His 1919 Notes were republished in 1971 by François Maspero. Yvonne, having published her own memoirs in 1978 at Éditions Grasset, survived her husband by almost five decades, dying in 1993, aged 103 or 104. Their direct descendants include great-grandson Eric Lemonnier, a Paris psychiatrist specializing in autism; Lemmonier's mother was a politician of the conservative Rally for the Republic in the 13th arrondissement, and his father a producer for France 3.

== Works ==
- Vive la République des Soviets!, 1918
- Notes sur la révolution bolchévique, 1919
- Quarante Lettres de Jacques Sadoul, 1922
- Naissance de l'U.R.S.S. De la nuit féodale à l'aube socialiste, 1946
