= Jacques Sadoul (writer) =

French novelist (1934–2013)

Jacques Sadoul (1934 – 18 January 2013) was a French novelist, book editor and non-fiction author.

== Work on science fiction ==
His Histoire de la science-fiction moderne, 1911-1971 [“History of Modern Science Fiction”] (1973; in 2 volumes 1975; revised 1984) is a lengthy survey of the field. It has been criticized in Western countries for lacking critical analysis, including too many sweeping generalizations, and personal prejudices. It is considered a serious, academic study of science fiction, particularly among the East European countries. It is considered an authoritative and trustworthy continental source, studying most science-fiction works published across the English Channel or the Atlantic.

Sadoul was a well-known science fiction fan and magazine collector. In Paris, in 1973, he published an album of illustrations from American science fiction magazines, Hier, l’an 2000.

He was one of the first editors to launch science fiction in paperback form in France. He was born in Agen, and worked first with “Editions Opta” and then with “J’ai lu”, where he founded the science fiction imprint and edited the Les Meilleurs Récits series of anthologies of stories translated from the American pulp magazines. He also founded the Prix Apollo award. Hier, l’an 2000: L’illustration de science fiction des annees 30 (1973; translated into English and published in the United States in 1975 as: 2000 A.D.: Illustrations From the Golden Age of Science Fiction Pulps), is a book of science fiction illustrations which he gathered, mostly black-and-white, a selection of science fiction nostalgia material, but has no index.

== Other work ==
Sadoul was a prolific novelist. His work includes crime-fiction/spy-fiction novels such as the "Carol Evans cycle" (consisting of ten novels), fantasy novels (such as the trilogy La Passion selon Satan [“The Passion according to Satan”] (1960), Le Jardin de la licorne [“The Garden of the Unicorn”] (1978), and Les hautes terres du rêve) and science fiction novels. In 1987, he received the Grand Prix de Littérature Policière for Trois morts au soleil.

Sadoul has authored works on alchemy, the fantastique and crime fiction. In 2006, he published his memoirs C’est dans la poche!.
