= Henri Guilbeaux =

French socialist

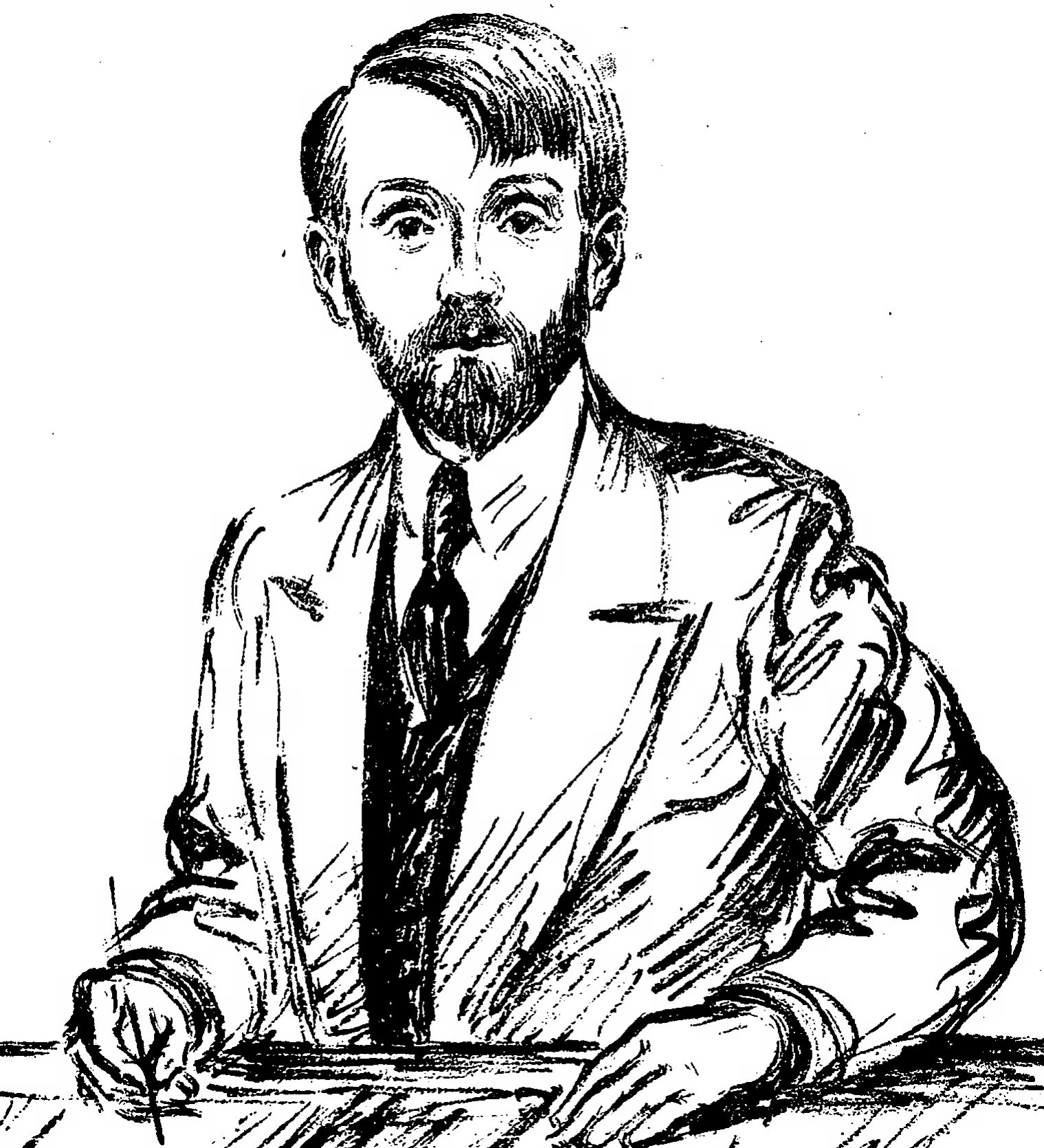
Henri Guilbeaux in 1919

Henri Guilbeaux (1885–1938) was a French socialist politician and poet. He was active in the Zimmerwald Anti-War Movement during World War I.

Guilbeaux was a prominent figure in a group of intellectuals in Geneva who opposed continuation of the war. Another member of the group was his friend Stefan Zweig, whose poems he translated into French. Zweig nonetheless criticizes him in "Die Welt von Gestern," saying that he "was not a gifted person" and that "I must frankly denominate his literary ability as inconsiderable. His command of language was not more than average; his education was not profound. His entire power lay in controversy." However, Zweig praises his talent for writing polemics. He published a magazine called "Demain", that became a point of reference for all who were against the war. Lenin, Trotsky and Lunacharsky all published in the paper. Because of his political credo and his strong personality, he was judged by default in France and sentenced to death but managed to escape to Russia with the help of Lenin. He became a Communist and was active in the Comintern. He later opposed Joseph Stalin and supported Leon Trotsky. Becoming more politically isolated and distant from the French communist movement in the final years of his life, he showed public support for the regime of Benito Mussolini and collaborated with the French secret services. Pardoned by the French justice, he died, almost forgotten, in Paris in 1938.
